= South Kingstown High School =

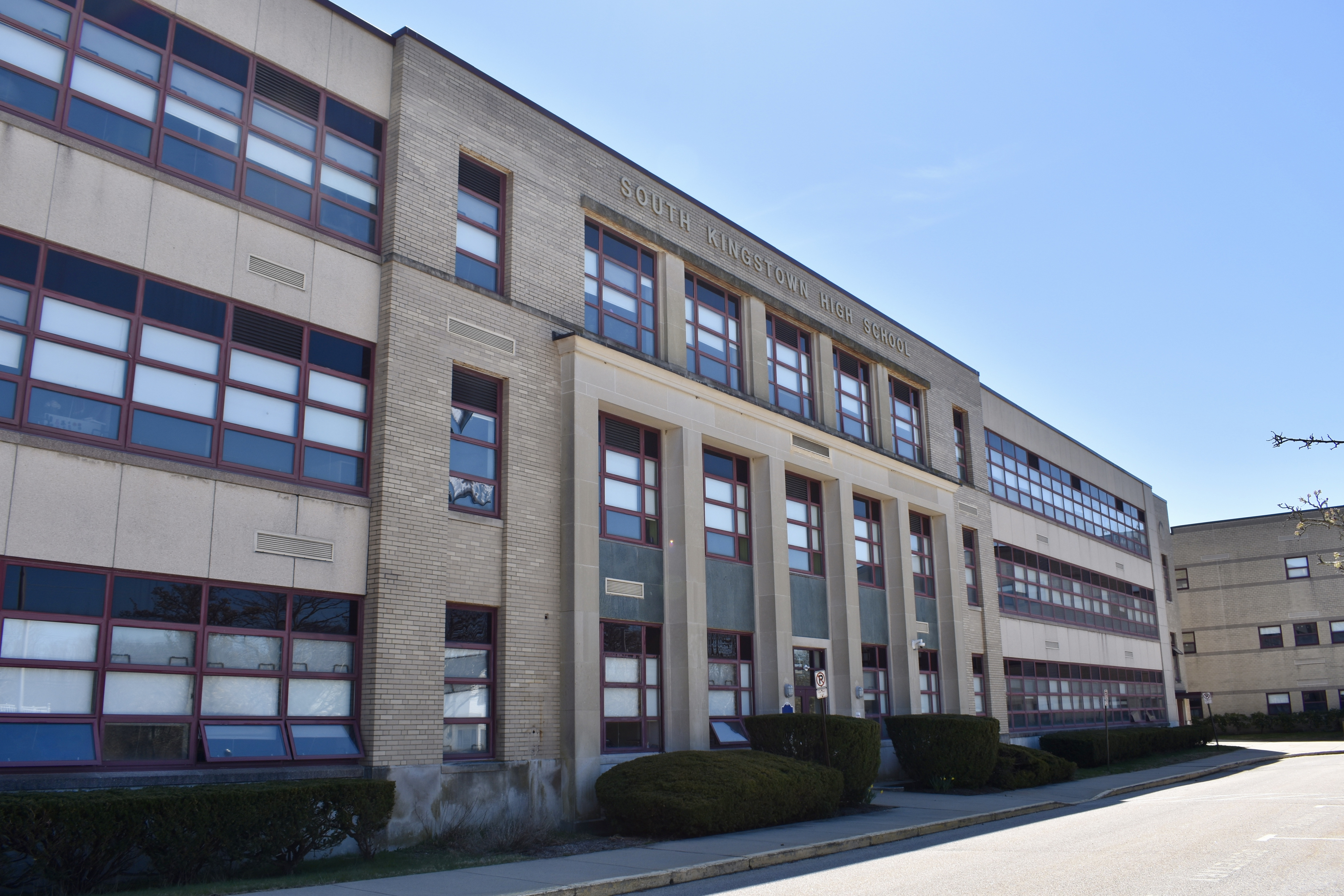
- South Kingstown High School main entrance

Location
- 215 Columbia Street; Wakefield, Rhode Island 02879; South Kingstown, Rhode Island; United States; 41.44642°N 71.49517°W

Information
- Type: Public
- Motto: "Home of the Rebels"
- Established: 1880
- Founder: Rowland G. Hazard
- Status: Will be replaced by newer building for the 2027-2028 school year
- School board: South Kingstown School Board
- School district: South Kingstown School Department
- Superintendent: Mark Prince
- Principal: Chip McGair
- Teaching staff: 107
- Grades: 9–12
- Enrollment: 735 (2023-2024)
- Campus: Suburban
- Colors: Navy and White
- Mascot: The Rowdy Rebel
- Nickname: The Rebels
- Rival: North Kingstown High School
- National ranking: 1,553
- Newspaper: The Rebellion
- Yearbook: The Anchor
- Feeder schools: Broad Rock Middle School, Curtis Corner (1964 - 2022)
- Website: https://hs.skschools.net/ http://www.skrebellion.com/

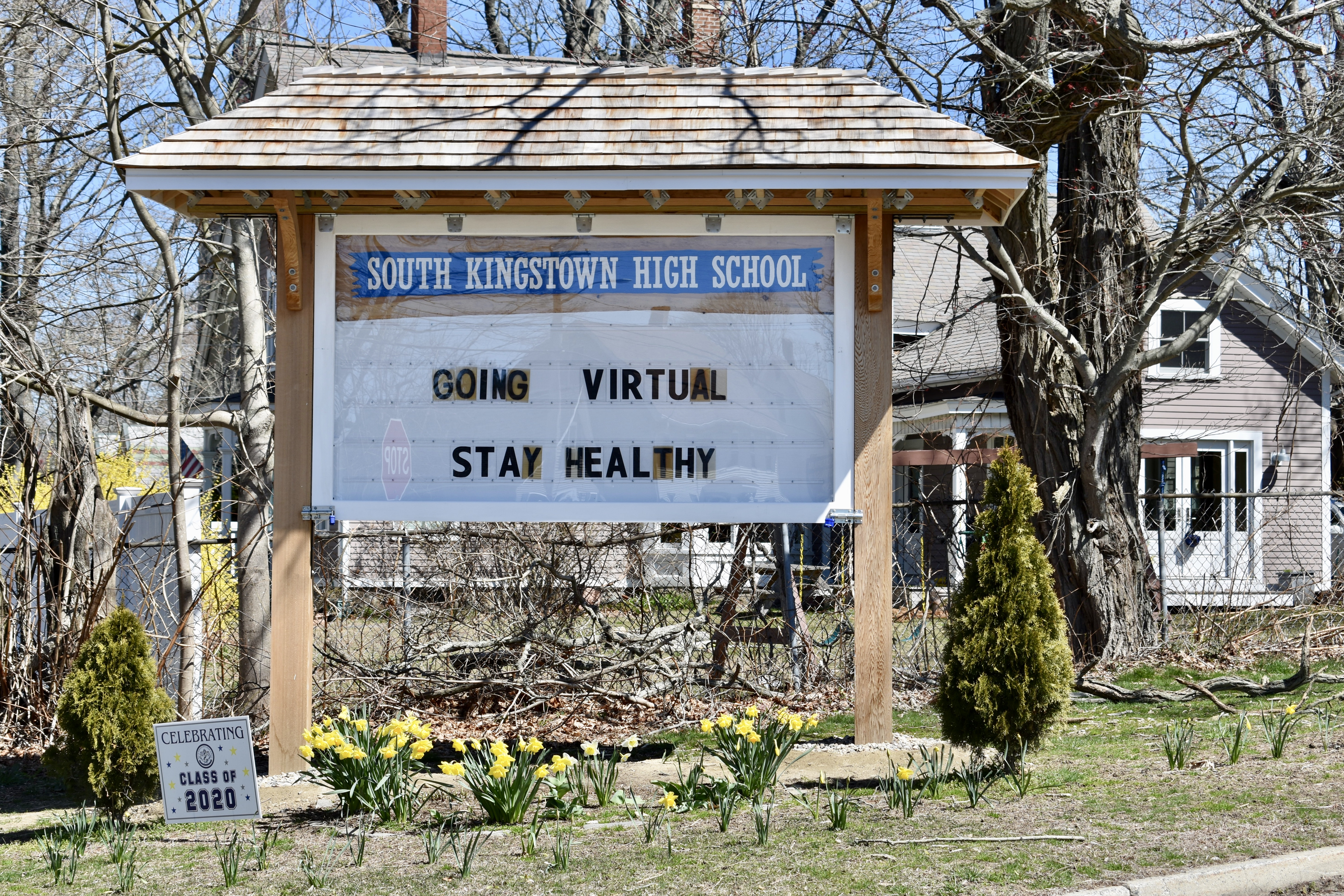
SKHS announcement board during the COVID-19 outbreak

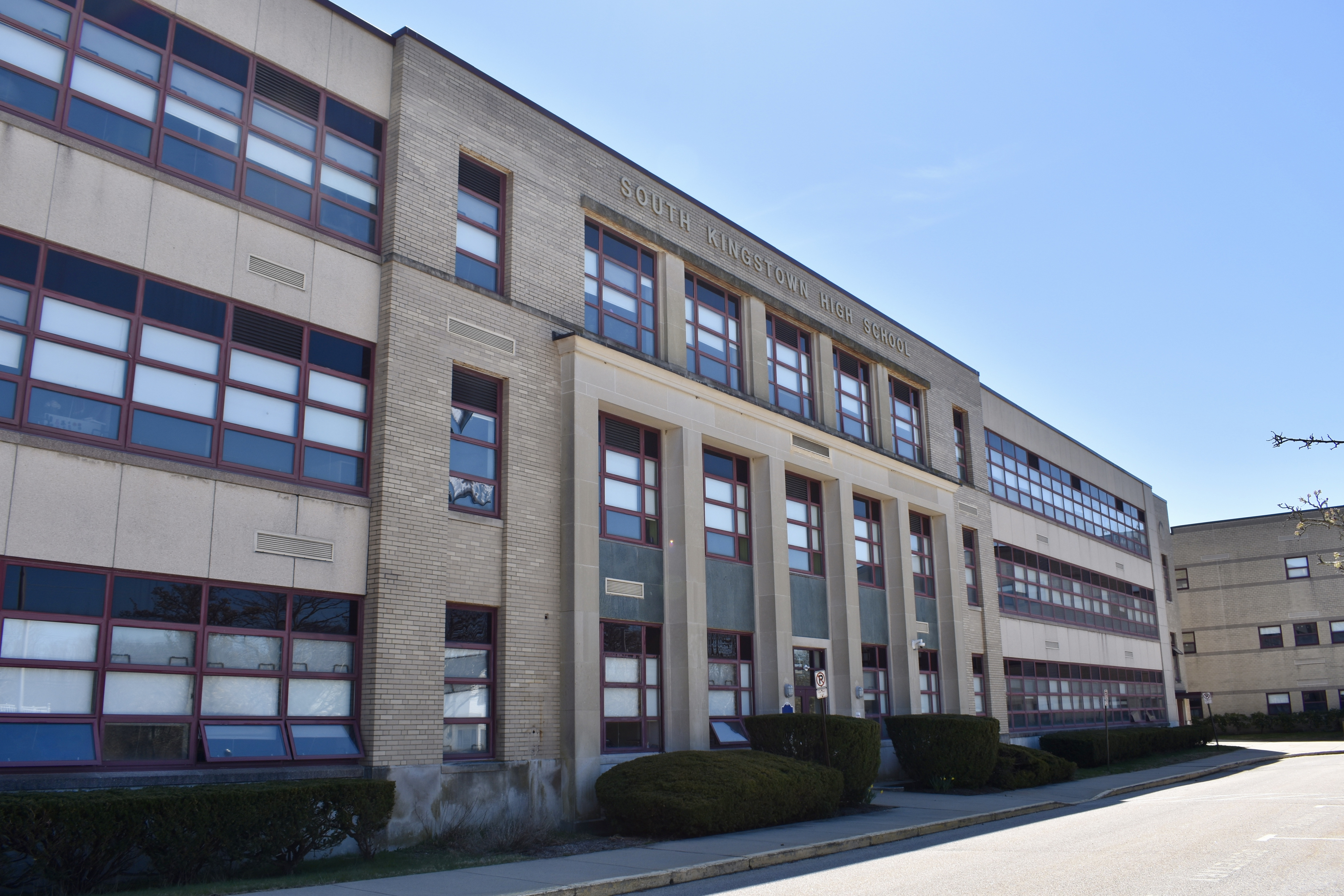
Main Entrance of South Kingstown High School

South Kingstown High School (SKHS), originally known as the Wakefield High School is a public high school located in South Kingstown, Rhode Island. Approximately 931 students attend South Kingstown High School in grades 9–12. South Kingstown High School is ranked 6th in the state of Rhode Island with an Advanced Placement (AP) participation rate of 54%. The school was established in 1880 and has changed buildings three times.

== History ==
=== Early history ===
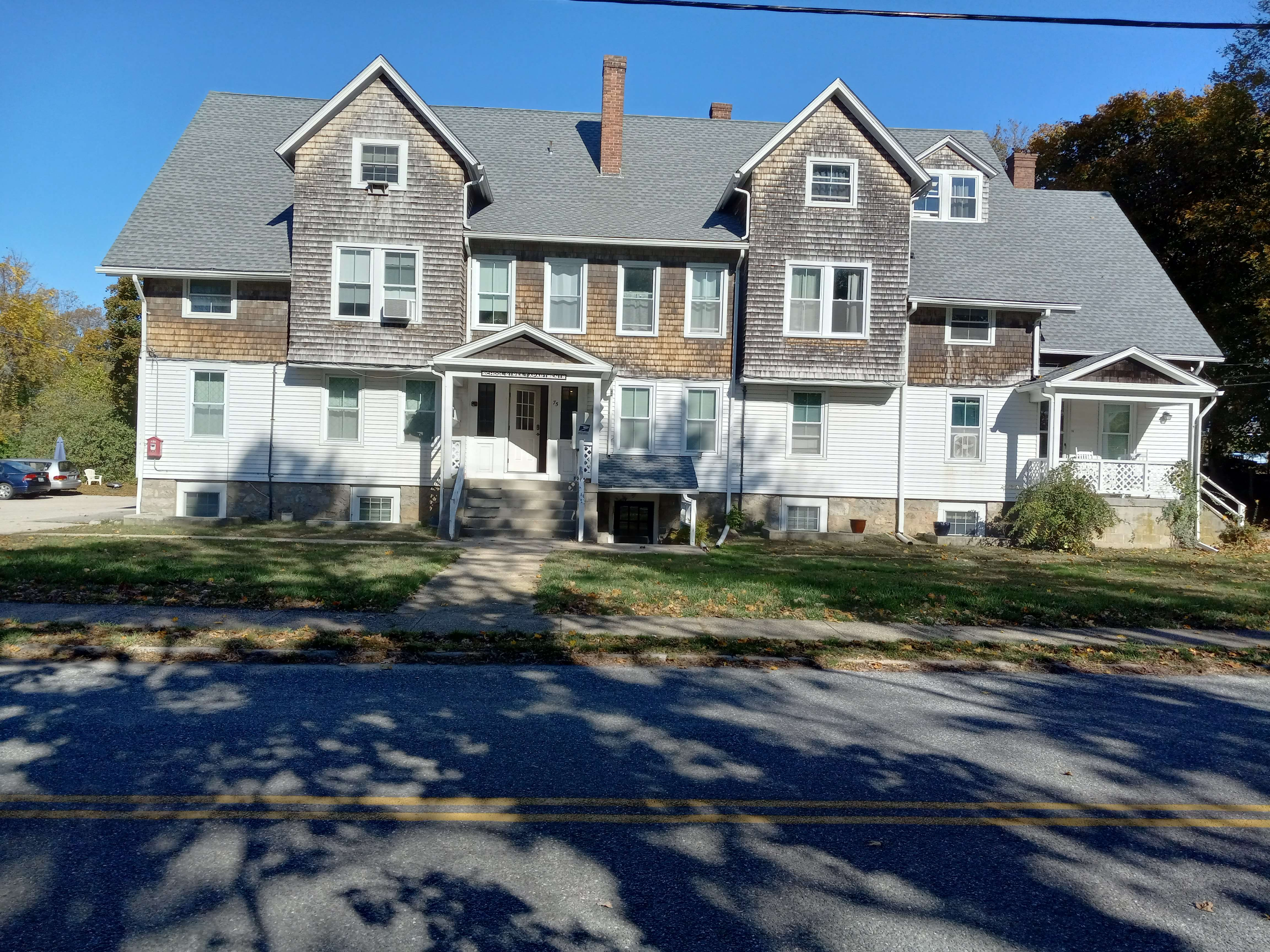
Original South Kingstown High School built in 1880, now the School Street Apartments.

South Kingstown High School was originally located at Narragansett Pier, formerly a part of South Kingstown. The school was then moved to the Columbia Building, also called the Times Building in Wakefield at the intersection of Columbia Street, Main Street, and Woodruff Avenue, in 1878. The high school remained in the Columbia Building until the building burnt down in a fire on April 10, 1880. South Kingstown High School continued to serve as Narragansett's High School even after the two towns split in 1903, up until 1974, when Narragansett High School was built.

South Kingstown High School was officially established in 1880. The original building was built with funds provided by Rowland G. Hazard and located at 153 School Street, a street intersecting with Columbia Street. In 1909, when construction started on the new Hazard School building, the entire building was moved to 38 School Street and converted into residential apartment buildings where it remains today under the name "School Street Apartments".

In 1909, construction began on the new Hazard School building, which was completed on September 10, 1911. The Hazard School building was built in the Tudor Revival architectural style, and is still on the property, however it ceased operations as a High School in 1954, following the construction of the current South Kingstown High School building, and is now used as a building for the South Kingstown School District Technological Department. The building was previously used as an elementary school until 1993, and again as a pre-school until 2013.

In 1932, a war memorial and flagpole designed by Albert E. Tickell was dedicated, commemorating major foreign wars the United States took part in, including the American Revolutionary War, the War of 1812, the Spanish-American War, and World War I. The memorial fell into disrepair, but was refurbished and restored in 2018.

Planning of the current high school building began in 1946 and construction officially began in 1952, following the South Kingstown Town Council approving a $600,000 bond to construct a new building. Construction completed in 1954, and the building is currently still in use. The building underwent major renovations in 1987 and 1996.

=== Contemporary history ===
In 2016, a team of Local Educational Agents from the Rhode Island Department of Education fined the school for having evidence of high amounts of mold, mercury, oil, and other hazardous material exposed to faculty and students.

Chip McGair was appointed and confirmed by the South Kingstown School Committee as the new principal of the school in 2019, following the resignation of former principal Robert Mezzanotte who served from 2015 to 2019, following his acceptance of the position of principal of Lincoln High School. McGair was honored as "Outstanding First Principal for 2021", an award bestowed by the Rhode Island Association of School Principals in 2021 after being nominated by vice principal Jon Rapport.

On September 27, 2022, an anonymous shooting threat was sent to the school which caused South Kingstown Superintendent of Schools to shut down every school in the district on September 28, saying "All threats are taken seriously until deemed otherwise. Out of an abundance of caution, schools were closed on Wednesday.". The school launched a joint investigation into the threat with the South Kingstown Police Department, as well as the Rhode Island Attorney General's Office, the Rhode Island State Police, and the Federal Bureau of Investigation. A suspect was identified on September 28 and it was announced that the schools would reopen on September 29. South Kingstown Chief of Police, Matthew Moynihan, stated that the suspect was a student at the high school.

In October, 2025, ground was broken on a new high school building. The building will cost an estimated $150 million dollars and is scheduled to be completed by the start of school in September, 2027. The new building will be located on the current field behind the existing school, and after completion, the original building will be demolished and replaced with athletic fields.

== Athletics ==
South Kingstown High School is the home of the Rebels, a Division 1 athletics department (except the hockey team which has recently moved to Division 2 from Division 3 after going 15–0–1 and making it to the state title game). The Rebels are particularly renowned for their formerly nationally ranked boys' soccer team, which made it to the state finals in 2007, the girls' and boys' track and field teams, both of which have been Class B Champions (and in 2009, the girls' track and field team overcame the La Salle Rams and Hope Blue Waves to become the girls' state champions), the boys' volleyball team, which won the state championship in 2009, 2012 and 2016, and the boys' tennis team, which defeated the Bishop Hendricken Hawks to win its 14th consecutive state championship in 2012. The tennis team would go on to win championships in 2015 and 2016. SKHS won the Division 1 Championship Cup in 2009 for its demonstrated athletic prowess. South Kingstown High School additionally has a wide variety of varsity and intramural sports.

=== Criticism of the school's mascot ===
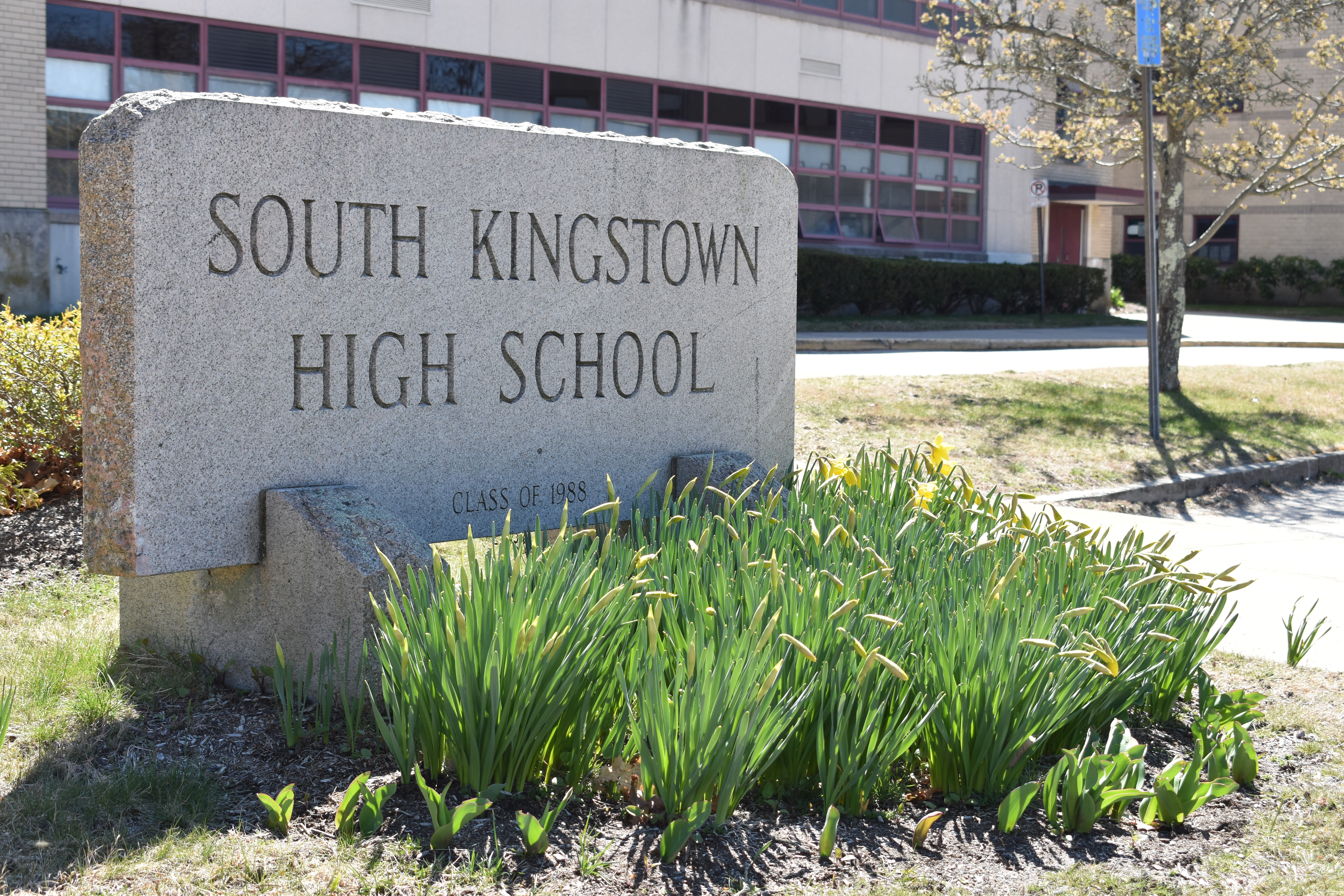
Stone Carved Sign, Gift from the Class of 1988

Following the Charleston church shooting, the issue of renaming the High School's mascot was brought up to the South Kingstown School Committee. Jim Vincent, the president of the National Association for the Advancement of Colored People's chapter in Providence, Rhode Island, was quoted saying he was not concerned with changing the name of the mascot.

In 2020, after the murder of George Floyd and subsequent protests, a petition was started on Change.org to rename the school's mascot, but no changes were made to the mascot.

== Music and the Arts ==
The South Kingstown High School music department consists of various vocal and instrumental groups, including Chorus, eSKape, Jazz Band, Concert Band, and the Symphony Orchestra. The orchestra at South Kingstown High School is the last true high school orchestra with string instruments, wind instruments, brass instruments, and percussion in Rhode Island. The Jazz Band has competed in the RIMEA Jazz Festival and Berklee High School Jazz Festival for many years. In 2017, the South Kingstown High School Jazz Band placed 2nd in their division at Berklee High School Jazz Festival under the direction of Fritz Benz. The Berklee High School Jazz Festival is one of the most respected and competitive high school music programs in the United States.

=== SKpades ===
Every year, the current junior class puts on a production called SKpades. SKpades is a variety show that traditionally combines a parody of a popular television show or movie along with skits that poke fun at some teachers, students, and aspects of life at South Kingstown High School. Recent themes have included The Hunger Games, The Godfather, 007, Charlie and the Chocolate Factory, Alice in Wonderland, Scooby-Doo, The Lorax, Twilight Zone, The Lion King, Harry Potter, and the Wizard of Oz and television shows (such as Saturday Night Live). Due to the COVID-19 pandemic, SKpades did not happen in the 2019–20 and 2020-21 school years, but resumed with two productions in the 2021–22 school year, one by the senior class and one by the junior class. Ryan Pandolfini and Aidan O'Sullivan played Principal Chip McGair in the 2022 and 2023 SKpades, respectively.

=== Theatre Arts ===
South Kingstown High School has strong academic and extracurricular theatre programs. According to the high school's official website, there are 5 credit-earning theatre courses that are taught by Ryan Muir. Additionally, there is a highly active Drama Club at SKHS, called the Rebel Theatre Group. The Rebel Theatre Group does several productions throughout the year, including "Testing Testing 1234" which is a collaboration with the Contemporary Theatre Company. The Rebel Theatre Group is best known for the large-scale musical production that takes place in February of each year. Recent productions included Newsies, The Adams Family, The Sound of Music, Young Frankenstein, A Funny Thing Happened on the Way to the Forum, Shrek the Musical, Bye Bye Birdie, Legally Blonde, and most recently 9 to 5. SKHS also regularly participates in the Rhode Island Drama Festival, which is the biggest high school theatre competition in Rhode Island. Finally, the Rebel Theatre Group will finish out the year with a smaller-scale production in the spring. Recent productions have included popular shows like Almost Maine and student-written/student-directed shows like Demetri.jpg and the Honest to Goodness Truth, a one-act comedy written and directed by two members of the class of 2018. 9 to 5 was the latest show performed by the Rebel Theatre Group, and opened in February 2024. Shrek the Musical will open on February 6, 2025.

== Notable alumni ==
- Mark Atkinson, actor (class of 1997)
- James V. Aukerman, politician (class of 1966)
- Ben Brutti, Minor League Baseball player and 11th round pick of the Cincinnati Reds (class of 2022)
- William Beck, alpine skier and Olympian (class of 1947)
- Andrew Burnap, Tony winner (class of 2009)
- David B. Champagne, United States Marine Corps corporal and Congressional Medal of Honor recipient (class of 1950)
- Victoria Gu, politician (class of 2011)
- Rowland Hazard III, businessman and politician (class of 1900)
- Grafton Kenyon, businessman and politician (class of 1900)
- Jhumpa Lahiri, Pulitzer Prize-winning author (class of 1985)
- Caroline Parente, Miss Rhode Island 2023 and Miss America 4th place runner up (class of 2020)
- Erika Van Pelt, finalist on American Idol, Season 11 (class of 2003)
- Lucy Rawlings Tootell, politician (class of 1929)
- Rob Roy Rawlings, politician (class of 1938)
- Michael Woodmansee, child murderer (class of 1976)
- Lindsay Crouse (journalist), NY Times journalist and film producer (class of 2002)
