= Millicent Evison =

Millicent Evison McEntee (c.1876 – 1970) was a Shakespearean actress, screenwriter, and novelist.

== Early life ==
Evison was born in England and grew up in Canada.

== Career ==
Evison was called "one of the best impersonators of Shakespearean roles of the present school" by the Knoxville Sentinel in 1912. Evison toured the United States with Ben Greet's Shakespeare company and was influenced by his work.

Evison wrote the scenario for the 1917 film Next Door to Nancy. She wrote the story the 1918 film The Mating was based on. Her novel Over the Garden Wall was also adapted to film of the same name.

Her book Rainbow Gold was marketed as the story of a girl who brings cheer. Her book Over the Garden Wall was described as a society romance novel.

The Unitarian Register gave Rainbow Gold a favorable writeup as a tried and true type story for girls. The Christian Advocate also gave the charming and happy ending story a writeup.

== Politics ==
Evison considered herself a suffragist, but did not support some of the more militant tactics being used to fight for women's suffrage.

== Personal life ==
Evison married Francis D. McEntee, with whom she had toured while acting.

She died in Moorestown, New Jersey on 29 January 1970, aged 93.

== Bibliography ==
- Rainbow Gold (1920), illustrated by W. I. Duphiney
- Peggy Pretend (1922), illustrated by Edna F. Hart Hubon.
- The Good-for-Nothing Graysons (1928), illustrated by F. Vaux Wilson.
- Over the Garden Wall, a novel

== Filmography ==
- Next Door to Nancy, scenario
- The Mating (1918), story author
- Over the Garden Wall (1919), based on her novel
