= Wood River Branch Railroad =

Defunct railroad in Rhode Island, United States

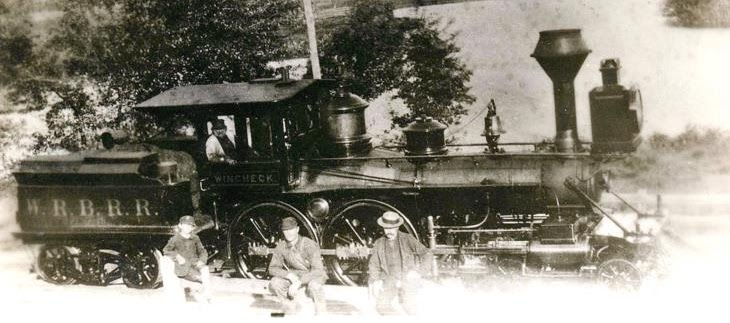
- Wincheck, the second locomotive of the Wood River Branch Railroad

Overview
- Locale: Rhode Island, United States
- Dates of operation: 1874–1927; 1928–1947

Technical
- Track gauge: 4 ft 8 1/2 in (1,435 mm) standard gauge
- Length: 5.6 miles (9.0 km)

The Wood River Branch Railroad was a shortline railroad in Rhode Island, United States. Chartered in 1872 and opened on July 1, 1874, the 5.6-mile (9.0 km) line operated (with one major interruption) until 1947. It connected Hope Valley, Rhode Island, to the New York, Providence and Boston Railroad (known as the Stonington Line) mainline at Wood River Junction. Though always nominally independent, the company was closely affiliated with the Stonington Line and its successor, the New York, New Haven and Hartford Railroad (the New Haven), which held significant portions of its stock.

The Wood River Branch carried both passengers and freight for local mills and other industries. A small operation, the company owned only one or two locomotives at any given time. Rhode Island citizen Ralph C. Watrous became president of the railroad in 1904, and remained involved in its operation for the next 33 years. He defended the railroad from several attempts at abandonment. A major flood in November 1927 severed the line and suspended all operations. The company considered abandonment, but ultimately local citizens and the New Haven agreed to rebuild the damaged segments and return the line to service for freight only, using a gasoline locomotive.

Abandonment was considered again in 1937, but the New Haven instead agreed to sell the line for $301 to businessman Roy Rawlings, owner of a grain mill that was the line's biggest customer. He ran the company with his family and a small staff until 1947. That year, both his mill and two other Hope Valley industries were destroyed by fire. Lacking enough business to justify operating expenses, the railroad ceased operations and was abandoned in its entirety in August 1947. Little of the line remains as of 2018.

== History ==
Southern Rhode Island's first railroad was the New York, Providence and Boston Railroad (commonly known as the Stonington Line or simply the Stonington), which opened between Providence and Stonington, Connecticut, in 1837, connecting to New York City via steamboat. The arrival of rail transportation allowed major growth in textile mills, which used water power along local rivers, such as the Pawcatuck River. Mill owners found that transportation over land by wagon was costly in both time and money. In the mid-1860s, Harris Lanphear, owner of several mills on the Wood River (a tributary of the Pawcatuck), found that it cost three times as much to transport goods to Stonington than it did to ship them the rest of the way to New York. He and other local residents realized that a railroad would solve this problem.

The largest local manufacturer was the Nichols and Langworthy Machine Company, formed in 1834 at the site of the Crandall Mill. The mill was previously purchased by Gardner Nichols and Russel Thayer in 1824, at which time they first introduced the name Hope Valley. The Machine Company was created by Nichols along with Joshua and Joseph Langworthy, all of whom were later succeeded by Gardner Nichols' son Amos G. Nichols and with his brother Henry G. Nichols. By the 1860s, Nichols and Langworthy had expanded into the production of boilers, steam engines, textile machinery, and printing presses.

=== Formation and construction ===
Residents in the Hope Valley area first asked the Stonington to build a branch to serve local mills, but they were among many towns and cities along the Stonington's route that also desired branches, and the Stonington's management had no interest in building any branches regardless. The residents next chartered their own new railroad, the Wood River Railroad, in January 1867. The new company was authorized to raise up to $600,000 (equivalent to $11,600,000 in 2021) to complete a route from Wood River Junction (at the time known as Richmond Switch) on the Stonington Line to Greene on the Hartford, Providence and Fishkill Railroad (HP&F). It was also given the authority to merge with either of its connections after completing construction. The route was approximately 21 miles (34 km) and passed through generally hilly terrain, serving no major population centers; in fact, the promoters of the company had no intention of actually building a railroad. Their goal was to entice one of the proposed line's connections to intervene and build the line for them, a tactic that had succeeded elsewhere in the United States. The Stonington maintained its refusal to build branches, and while the HP&F built several short branches elsewhere, it had no interest in building one in southern Rhode Island. Without the resources of a larger railroad, no progress was made and the charter expired five years later.

Once the first charter expired, residents in the area sought out a new charter, this time intending to build the railroad themselves. The Wood River Branch Railroad was chartered in May 1872, along an approximately seven-mile (11 km) route beginning at Richmond Switch and ending in Hope Valley. The exact terminus location was not specified; the Hope Valley villages of Locustville and Wyoming both sought to have the railroad's terminus. To choose a route, the railroad's directors arranged for all stock subscriptions to be sorted into three groups: those who wanted a Wyoming terminus, those who wanted a Locustville terminus, and those who had no preference. By May 20, 172 shares had been pledged, including 50 for Locustville and 20 for Wyoming, with the remainder expressing no preference. The directors voted that the company's terminus would be Locustville if $35,000 (equivalent to $792,000 in 2021) were raised, but Wyoming instead if either $45,000 (equivalent to $1,018,000 in 2021) were raised or those in favor of Wyoming pledged a total of $10,000 (equivalent to $226,000 in 2021).

A survey was started under the direction of George T. Lanphear on July 17, 1872, and completed on August 2. Lanphear identified two routes from Richmond Switch to Locustville. The western alignment would cost $10,000 more, but would serve two additional mills in Woodville. To extend the line from Locustville to Wyoming would cost approximately an additional $23,000 (equivalent to $520,000 in 2021).

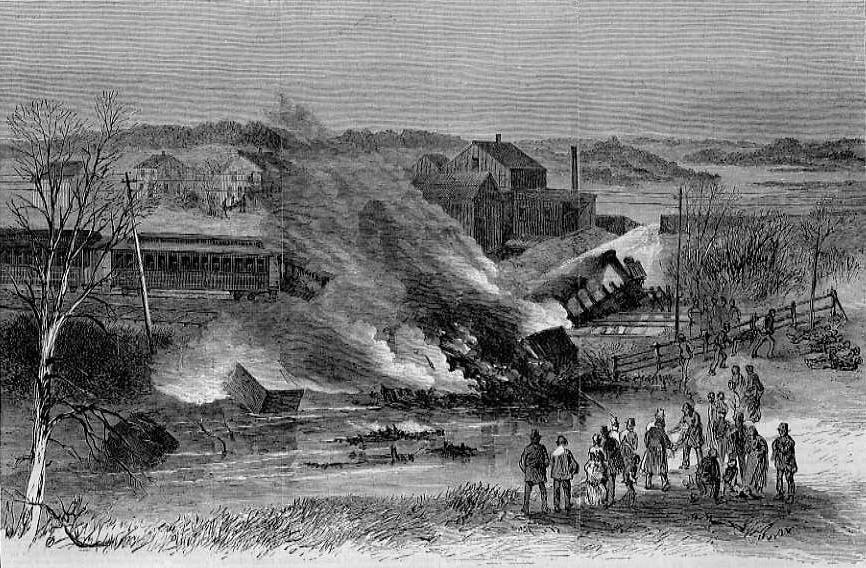
The 1873 train derailment at Richmond Switch

While progress had been made on raising funds, development of the railroad was impaired by both the Panic of 1873 and a deadly train derailment on the Stonington Line at Richmond Switch, caused by the washout of a railroad bridge due to a dam collapse. Most subscribers to the Wood River Branch's stock reduced their subscriptions accordingly, and one mill owner's pledge to buy 101 shares was wiped out with his death. The company was saved when on June 23, 1873, the Stonington Line finally decided to get involved and pledged $19,000, plus $1,000 worth of pledges made directly by that company's executives (equivalent to $430,000 and $23,000 in 2021, respectively). At this point, the Wood River Branch had $59,500 (equivalent to $1,346,000 in 2021) of subscribed stock, which was barely sufficient to reach Locustville, let alone Wyoming. The latter was excluded from the final route, much to the anger of Wyoming residents.

Construction of the line began on September 20, 1873, with a $95,500 (equivalent to $2,160,000 in 2021) contract awarded to J.B. Dacey & Co. to build the entire line. After delays caused by winter weather, construction was completed between Wood River Junction and Woodville by April 1874. Acquisition of a locomotive and rolling stock fell to board member Amos G. Nichols, who ordered a new 4-4-0 steam locomotive, named the Gardner Nichols after his father. With the branch out of money, Nichols purchased the locomotive from the Rhode Island Locomotive Works himself for $8,500 (equivalent to $204,000 in 2021). Nichols also purchased a new passenger car from the Worcester-based Osgood Bradley Car Company using $4,500 (equivalent to $108,000 in 2021) of Wood River Branch Railroad bonds instead of cash. There was no money left for a baggage car. The line opened for business on July 1, 1874.

=== Early operations ===
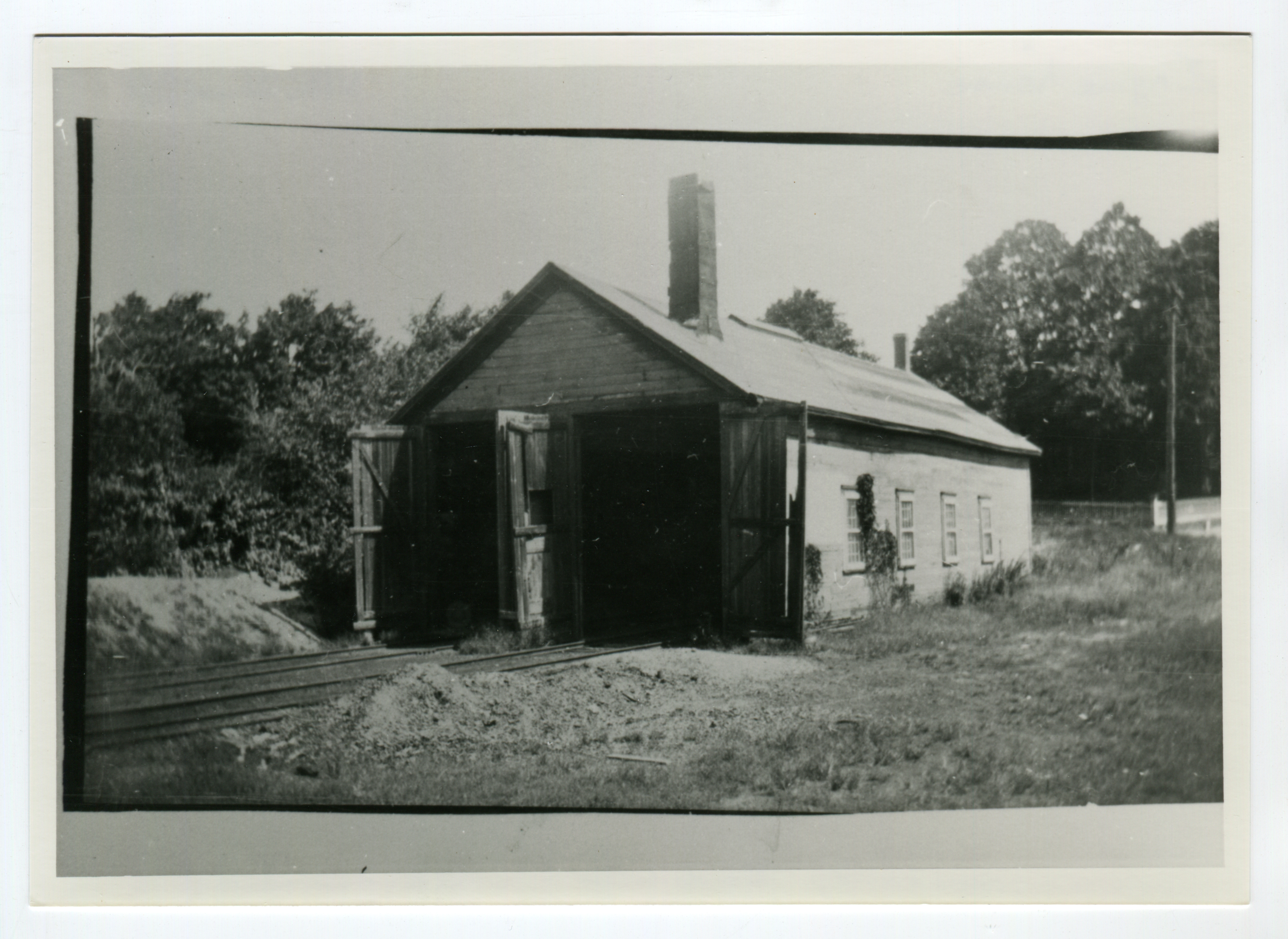
The railroad's engine house in Hope Valley

As the only major industry in Hope Valley, the Nichols and Langworthy Machine Company was the railroad's biggest customer and the only one with a dedicated siding. With a workforce of approximately 150 people, Nichols and Langworthy became known across the United States for the reliability of its engines, and most of the company's products were shipped to customers via the Wood River Branch Railroad.

The line quickly began to show an operating profit, but this was all but eliminated by interest payments on the $57,000 of bonds, totaling $4,000 annually (equivalent to $1,365,000 and $96,000 in 2021, respectively). Additionally, just under $18,000 of floating debt was required to make up the difference between construction expenses and the company's funding from bonds and stocks (equivalent to $431,000 in 2021). When bond payments were made, they were often late and usually funded by taking on additional floating debt.

The company's 10-person payroll cost $342 monthly (equivalent to $8,200 in 2021). The biggest costs were regular operating expenses (generally $4,400 to $4,800 per annum, equivalent to $105,000 to $115,000 in 2021) and maintenance of way, which was highly variable depending on weather events and accidents (anywhere from over $8,000 to under $4,000 per annum, equivalent to $192,000 to $96,000 in 2021). Expenses were amplified by the tendency of the line's iron rails to fracture when trains went through curves and very limited supply of spare parts (allegedly, when the line finished construction, only two pieces of rail and a few spikes were left unused).

Within a few years, it was clear to the company that additional income would be required to make bond payments; the Stonington Line rebuffed an 1882 attempt by Wood River Branch stock and bondholders to more evenly distribute revenue from passengers and freight connecting with the former at Wood River Junction. The Stonington Line saw as much as twice the income from Wood River Branch freight shipments as the branch did, as freight shipments were billed per mile traveled.

The railroad was threatened with default for unpaid bond interest in April 1884, which could force the company into receivership; this had recently caused the demise of another Rhode Island shortline, the Warwick Railroad. Bond payments almost due, which would bankrupt the company, amounted to $45,000 (equivalent to $1,357,000 in 2021). As the bondholders, stockholders, and company executives were largely one and the same, the primary bondholders agreed to accept new 10-year bonds as payment for the previous bonds.

The Stonington Line was purchased by the New York, New Haven and Hartford Railroad in 1892, which continued its predecessor's hands-off approach.

=== Watrous years ===
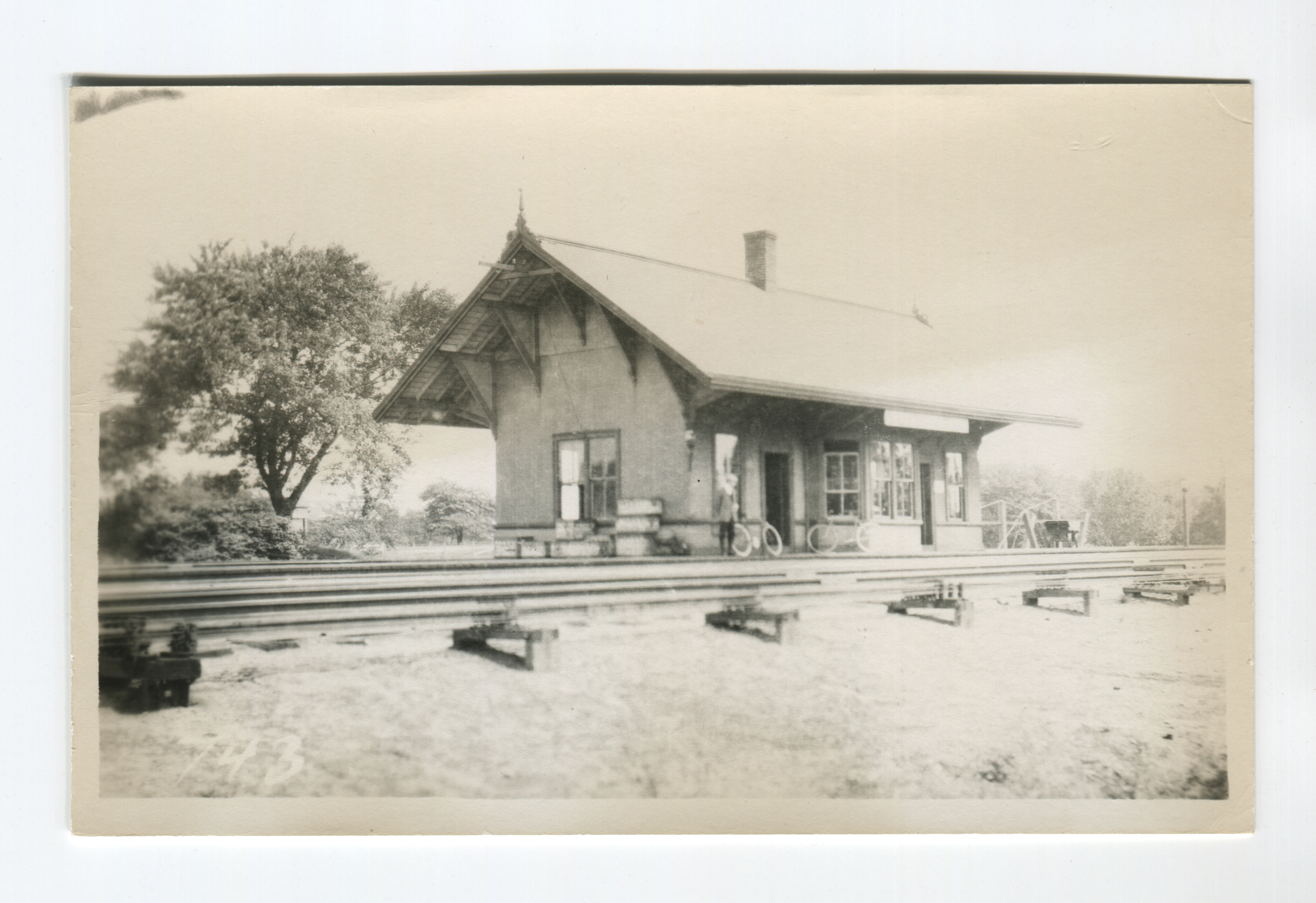
Wood River Junction station, c. 1916

Several of the company's leaders retired between 1900 and 1902, and president Amos G. Nichols died in January 1904. He was succeeded by Warwick native Ralph C. Watrous. Watrous first became involved with the company when he inherited a single share from his uncle in 1899. He began purchasing more shares, joining the company's board of directors in 1901. By 1903, he was the largest stockholder, with 75 shares to his name. Watrous later said he became involved with the railroad "so his mother wouldn't feel lonely or isolated in her Hope Valley home".

Watrous would serve as the Wood River Branch's president for the next 33 years, and steadfastly defeated several attempts at abandonment. He recalled one instance when he gave a New Haven Railroad executive intent on abandoning the line "some doughnuts, a glass of milk, and let him talk to my mother" and the executive changed his mind.

After many years of running passenger trains Monday through Saturday, the railroad introduced Sunday passenger service on July 29, 1903. Four trips were then provided on Sundays, with two round trips in the middle of the morning and two more in the late afternoon. A typical schedule in 1903 had four round trips each day, each timed to connect with New Haven Railroad trains to Providence. Despite being considered a success, the last Sunday trains ran on September 11, 1904. In general, the small line was at the mercy of the New Haven's scheduling, and had to adjust its timetables when the New Haven changed its train service to Wood River Junction.

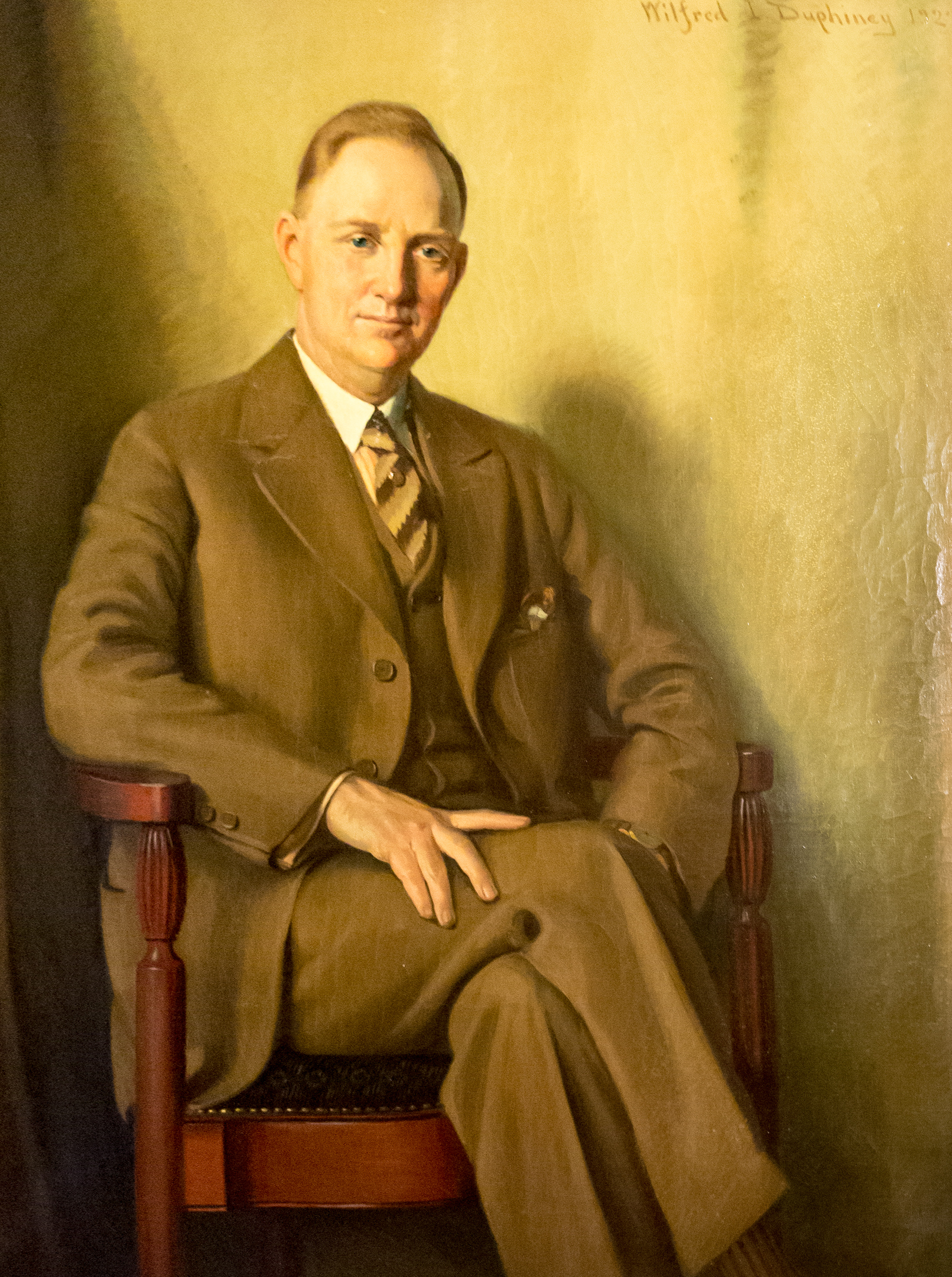
Roy Rawlings in the 1920s, when he was serving as speaker of the Rhode Island House of Representatives

The Nichols and Langworthy Machine Company site was destroyed by a fire on April 13, 1909. By this point, the company had already been struggling with reduced demand and poor relations between employees and management. The Machine Company never recovered, and its assets were sold at auction in 1910. Several successors continued manufacturing at the site on a much reduced scale until 1925, but for the Wood River Branch Railroad the damage had already been done. Before the fire, the railroad had been averaging an annual freight volume of 23,000 long tons (26,000 short tons; 23,000 t), this was reduced to 16,000 long tons (18,000 short tons; 16,000 t) afterward. The loss of the Machine Shop's traffic badly hurt the railroad's finances.

Businessman Roy Rawlings signed a lease with the railroad for a property adjacent to the Hope Valley station in 1917. He opened a grain mill on the property the following year, which relied on the railroad for deliveries of grain. Shipments for the Rawlings grain mill eventually formed a large share of the railroad's business.

The Wood River Branch Railroad was temporarily placed under the control of the United States Railroad Administration (USRA) with the rest of the nation's railroads in 1917, as a result of the country's entry into World War I and the railroads' inability to handle the resulting surge in traffic. It returned to independence on March 1, 1920, though the Hope Valley Advertiser noted that the company was too reliant on the New Haven to truly be considered an independent operation. Wartime demands meant little time was devoted to maintenance, and the railroad was returned in a poor state of repair. Increased support, both direct and indirect, from the New Haven was necessary to address the deferred maintenance and keep the Wood River Branch running.

A fire destroyed the Wood River Branch Railroad engine house in the early hours of April 16, 1920, along with the company's sole remaining steam locomotive. The New Haven dispatched a replacement, which was rushed to Hope Valley and arrived quickly enough to run the first scheduled train on that day.

For several months in 1924, the Wood River Branch experienced "one of its biggest freight booms in its history" when state highway construction near Hope Valley demanded large shipments of trap rock and cement along the railroad. In a span of eight days, 110 cars of construction materials were handled, exceeding normal traffic levels by a significant margin. Also in 1924, the Wood River Branch defaulted on a more than $50,000 (equivalent to $791,000 in 2021) debt payment it owed the New Haven, which the larger company turned a blind eye to. Busy with its own money problems, the New Haven let the Wood River Branch continue operating rather than foreclose and assume its junior partner's financial issues as well.

=== 1927 flood and end of passenger operations ===
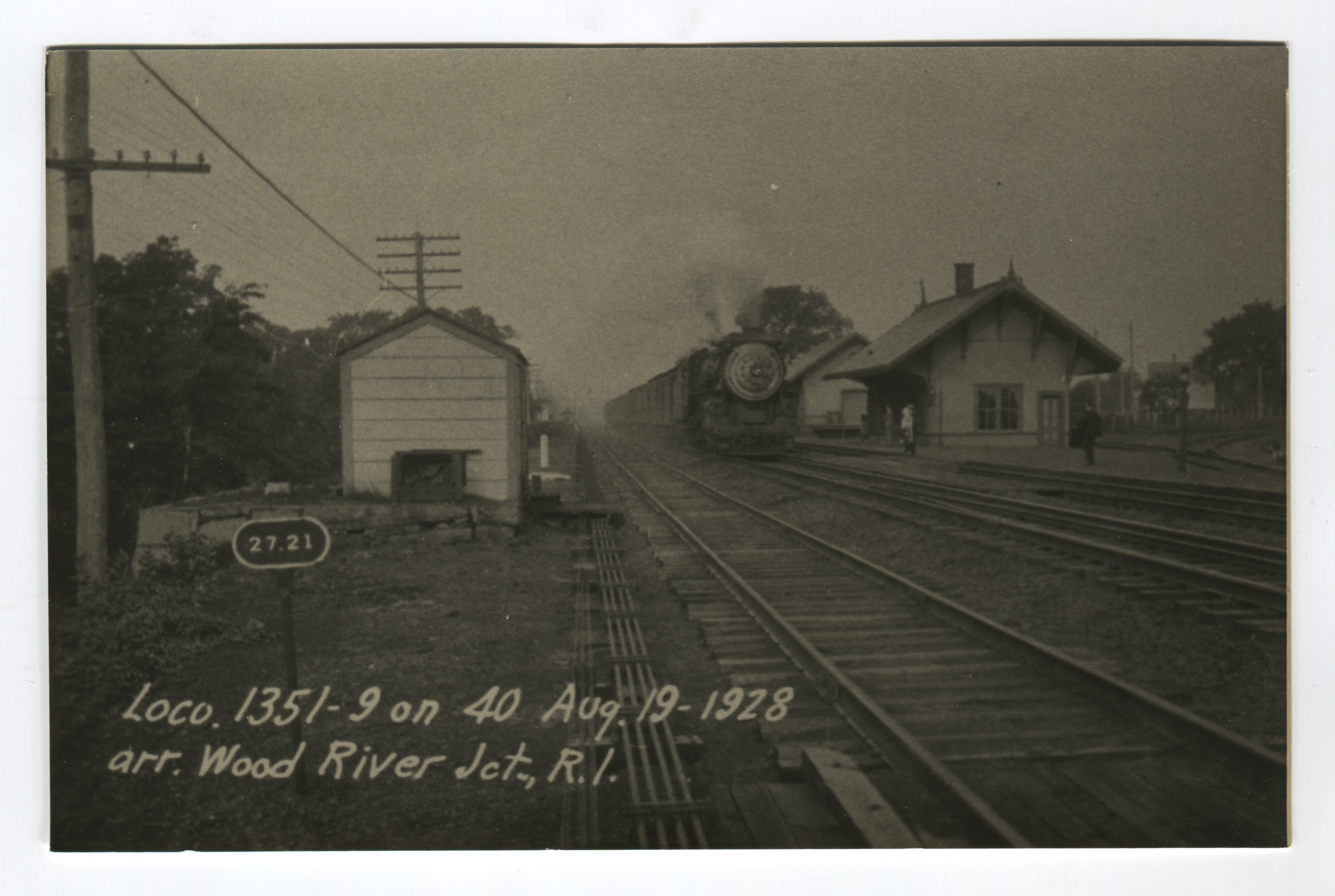
Wood River Junction station with a New York, New Haven and Hartford Railroad train in 1928

A major flood in November 1927 brought widespread damage to Rhode Island and shut down the Wood River Branch Railroad entirely, with multiple washouts from Woodville to Hope Valley and slight damage to the Wood River bridge. The railroad's passengers and mail were temporarily ferried by an automobile. Once the waters had receded, the New Haven dispatched an inspector, who estimated repairs would cost $5,000 (equivalent to $78,000 in 2021). The railroad had mounting financial problems: it had already defaulted on bond payments and was late in paying rental fees to the New Haven for equipment, when it could afford to pay them at all. While the $5,000 repair bill would not be a major expense for a healthy railroad, for the Wood River Branch it was an impossible demand.

Abandonment of the line appeared to be the only option, Watrous noting the company had consistently lost approximately $10,000 (equivalent to $156,000 in 2021) each year in the past decade. Having the New Haven take over would mean either spending a further $10,000 to relay the line with heavier rail and replacing old bridges, or operating the existing equipment with New Haven employees, which would require a significant increase in wages. It was suggested that the line acquire a gasoline-powered locomotive that could be operated cheaply and without track upgrades, but obtaining one would cost $10,000.

The board of directors met on November 15 at Watrous' request, and it was decided to seek permission from the Interstate Commerce Commission (ICC) to abandon the line. The washouts had stranded the railroad's passenger car, a leased New Haven locomotive, and a boxcar and hopper car in Hope Valley; a New Haven track crew joined forces with the Wood River Branch's employees to jack up the tracks at washouts so the stranded equipment could return to Wood River Junction. The Wood River Branch began shutting down, and its employees were laid off apart from a single man who continued fulfilling the line's mail contracts.

A number of residents and businesses in the area were opposed to the abandonment. On November 17, they held a meeting and several businessmen reported they were heavily dependent on the railroad. A local mill reported that coal deliveries by truck would be far more expensive, E. R. Bitgood's lumbering operation needed the railroad to export lumber, and Roy Rawlings (by this point also speaker of the Rhode Island House of Representatives) could not continue operating his mill without three to four railroad cars of grain a day. Concerned citizens made their opposition known to the ICC and the Rhode Island Public Utilities Commission, and also asked the towns of Richmond and Hopkinton to cancel the railroad's taxes if it could be reopened.

When the level of opposition came to its attention, the New Haven offered to keep the line running, conditional on eliminating passenger service and cutting the frequency of freight service, and sufficient cost-cutting to make operations profitable. In February 1928, the New Haven came to an agreement with local citizens to reopen the line for freight service only; a gasoline-powered locomotive would be purchased and leased to the railroad by the New Haven for this purpose. New Haven track gangs were dispatched to repair the line, and the company agreed to directly handle maintenance for a year.

The New Haven became the official operator, but much as before, it left day-to-day operations to Watrous. Although the New Haven could foreclose on the Wood River Branch at any time, it was not to the New Haven's advantage to do so; foreclosing meant New Haven employees would have to run the line, an expensive proposition due to the company's unionized workforce. If the New Haven were directly in control, the ICC might even refuse to allow the line to be abandoned no matter how unprofitable it became. Instead, the company offered to lease the line to the towns of Richmond and Hopkinton, but locals deemed this impractical. A new company to operate the line was suggested, but with the existing Wood River Branch Railroad still around, that company was revived and in April resumed train service. The New Haven leased the gas locomotive, which could pull up to six freight cars at a time, to the Wood River Branch for $113 per month (equivalent to $1,800 in 2021).

=== Post-flood re-opening and the Great Depression ===
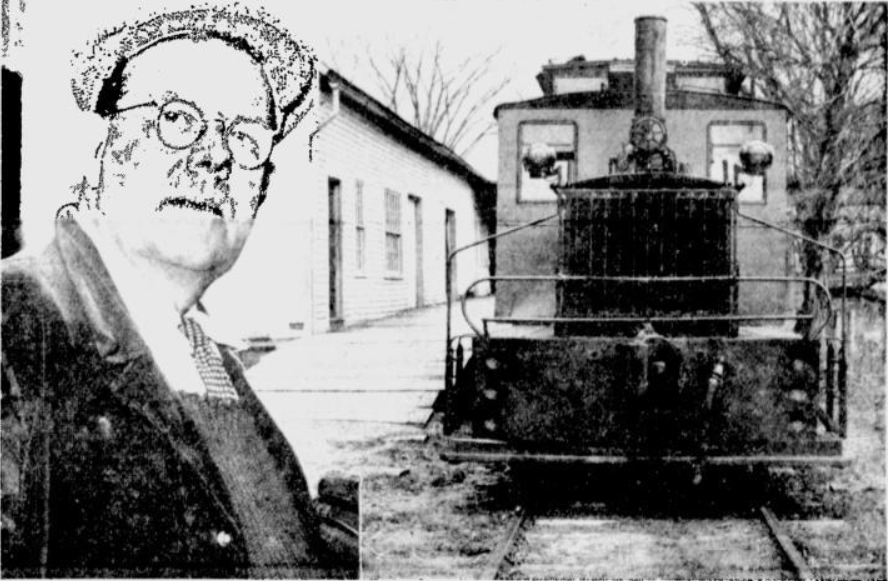
Composite image of Otis A. Larkin, at the time the Wood River Branch Railroad's sole employee, with the company's locomotive in 1937.

With the New Haven as the official operator after the 1927 flood, extensive steps were taken to cut costs. Only a few employees were retained, and the Plymouth locomotive (numbered A100) made a single round trip three or four days a week, a sharp reduction from what had been six runs per day before the flood. With passenger service ended, the combination passenger and baggage car was taken by the New Haven, and in its place the Wood River Branch acquired a second-hand caboose and converted it to handle less-than-carload freight. To help the line's finances, much of its required paperwork was assigned to the New Haven's station agent at Wood River Junction.

Initially, the cost-cutting succeeded in reversing the Wood River Branch's years of unprofitability. The local lumber industry was aided by the return of the railroad, and exports of lumber and railroad ties gave the company business. By 1929, the railroad was showing a profit, aided greatly by the efficiency of the A100, which only required a single operator and negated the hours of work required to start a steam locomotive each day.

It's been fun being a railroad president, even if I did own only six miles. I've traveled all over the country on railroads and I've always been received as a fellow railroad president.

— Ralph C. Watrous, quoted in The Lewiston Daily Sun, April 14, 1937

The brief revival was cut short by the onset of the Great Depression that same year. Many of the mills along the line were forced to either close or reduce their shifts, and demand for lumber also decreased. While Richmond agreed to suspend the railroad's property taxes in 1930, and two shuttered mills were reopened in 1932, the railroad began reporting losses in 1930 which evaded all cost-cutting measures. The company downsized to two employees in 1932, and the New Haven cut the rent for the A100 to a token $50 per month (equivalent to $1,000 in 2021). More and more track maintenance was deferred, as the economy continued to worsen. By 1933, Rawlings' mill and single cars of coal for the Howard C. Woodmansee Coal and Oil Company made up almost all of the line's traffic. In 1934, the Wood River Branch became a one-man operation, with Hope Valley resident Otis A. Larkin responsible for operating the train, handling cargo, and maintaining the line and stations.

Losses continued the following years, and the New Haven was required to make up the deficits between income and expenses. Though the lumber industry began to recover in summer 1936, it was insufficient to prevent a $3,000 loss at the end of the year (equivalent to $59,000 in 2021). By 1937, most of the freight traffic came from one operation – Rawlings' grain mill. Bankrupt itself, the New Haven was under the control of bankruptcy trustees who had grown tired of the Wood River Branch being a money sink. In April 1937, they voted to cut all funding for the Wood River Branch, and the New Haven's president gave the news to Watrous on April 12. The news became public on April 14, and the following day the bankruptcy trustees voted at the Wood River Branch's annual stockholders' meeting to abandon the line (the only stockholders being the New Haven and Watrous). (Note: Watrous did not attend the meeting, but suspected the New Haven wished to abandon the line so it could shut down its depot at Wood River Junction; this depot effectively existed solely to connect with the Wood River Branch.) Over 70 years old, and with his mother no longer alive, Watrous was largely consigned to the impending abandonment of the railroad. However, he also pledged his support should local citizens launch an effort to save the line.

=== Roy Rawlings takes over ===
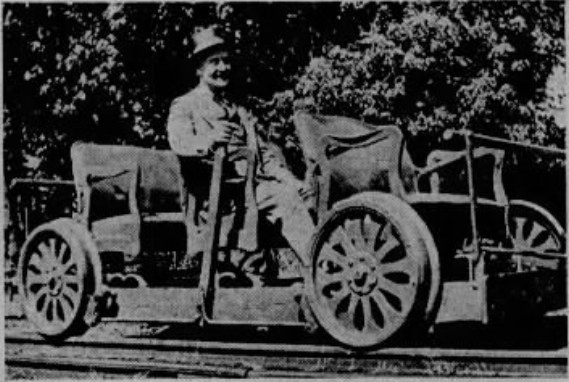
Roy Rawlings with the President's Special

While local newspapers were announcing the end of the Wood River Branch Railroad, Roy Rawlings took matters into his own hands. His grain mill was heavily dependent on the railroad, and when he learned of the impending abandonment, he promptly contacted the New Haven and asked how much they would charge him to buy the entire line. Once he got in contact with the company's management, Rawlings and the New Haven worked out a price: $301 (equivalent to $5,670 in 2021). (Note: The New Haven asked for $300 for the railroad; the extra dollar was for $57,000 worth of bonds that had no interest payments made for nearly two decades and effectively held no value.) Happy to be free of dealing with the unprofitable line, the New Haven's trustees agreed to the sale, and the ICC gave its blessing on June 3, 1937. On June 18, the Wood River Branch held a meeting and elected Roy Rawlings president of the company; Watrous was being treated at Rhode Island Hospital for an illness and did not attend. While the company was once again independent, the New Haven continued to lease the 20-ton gas locomotive to the Wood River Branch. No longer house speaker, Rawlings joked that being a railroad president would be both easier and more enjoyable than running the legislature.

Rawlings promptly renumbered the A100 as 1872, the railroad's founding year. He had the caboose and locomotive painted bright red, as a tribute to the extensive amount of red ink in the company's financial history. Service remained on an as-needed basis, up to four round trips per week. Mill employees often worked on the railroad and vice versa. Rawlings took an active interest in railroad operations, often assisting the locomotive engineer (usually his nephew Reat Scholfield) as a brakeman or making track repairs; Rawlings' wife Lucy Rawlings drove a few spikes herself. Operations were rather informal; trains would sometimes stop along the route so the train crew could pick blueberries or fish from the Wood River bridge; Rawlings looked the other way as long as the train crew brought some blueberries to his desk.

It may not be as long as other railroads, but it's just as wide.

— Roy Rawlings, quoted in The Day, April 13, 1938

In early 1938, Rawlings decided the railroad should once again have a passenger train. Scholfield and teenager Rob Roy Rawlings, the president's son, salvaged seats from the long-retired coach number one and attached them to an unpowered track car and added railings and a handbrake. The resulting contraption was attached to the railroad's gas-powered speeder, and named the "President's Special". Rawlings unveiled it at a stockholder meeting in April 1938, bringing stockholders on a round trip from Hope Valley to Wood River Junction. The "streamliner" made it from Hope Valley to the other end of the line in 18 minutes. It was put into service for outings, track inspection, and maintenance of way duties.

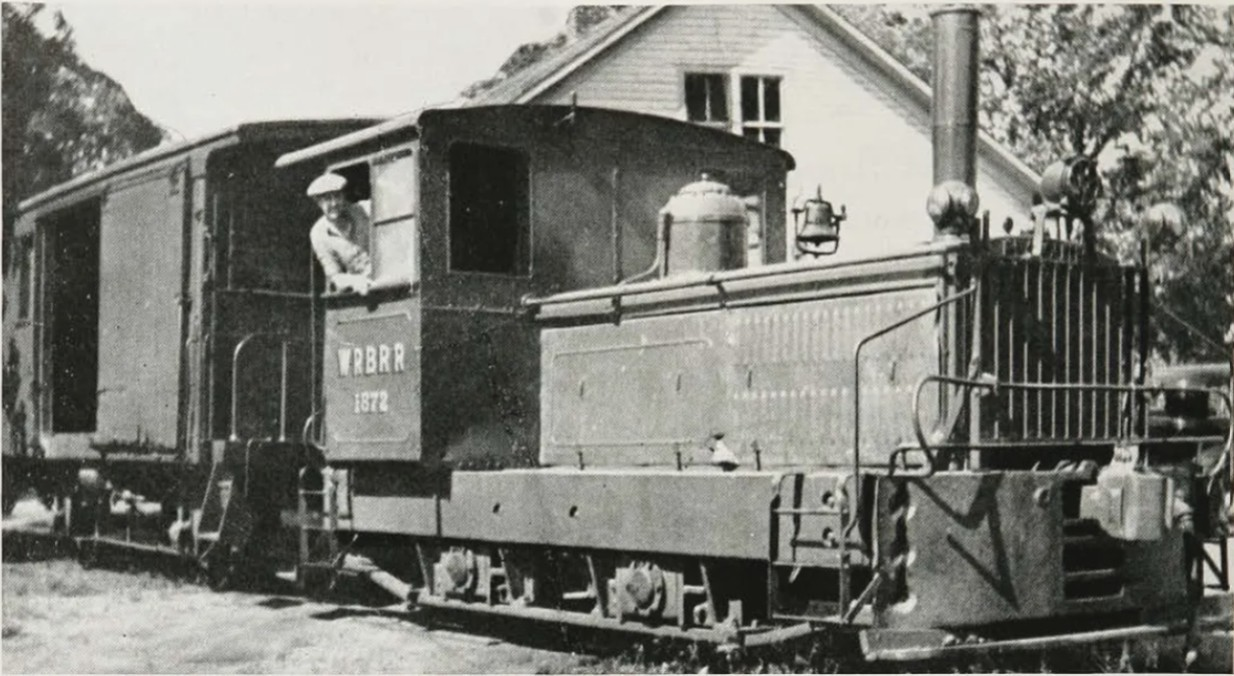
Reat Schofield at the controls of locomotive 1872 in 1941. Behind the locomotive is the railroad's combination freight car and caboose.

Under Rawlings' presidency, the railroad made large reductions in its losses, even showing an operating profit, but factoring in fixed expenses the company was losing money. Much of the reduction in expenses came from deferred maintenance. Even with a speed limit of 10 miles per hour (16 km/h) derailments became common, and tools for putting the train back on the track were a permanent fixture in the caboose. In October 1938, the company reported handling approximately 10,000 tons of freight per year.

In early 1941, Roy Rawlings moved to Florida with his wife and son after contracting a persistent case of pneumonia. His daughter Lucy Rawlings Tootell took over the day-to-day management of the railroad, "reputedly as the only woman VP of Operations in the U.S." Reat Scholfield was responsible for operating the grain mill.

During World War II, production of the M1941 Johnson rifle began in Rhode Island, including at the Rhode Island Arms Company, which moved into part of the mill in Centerville. As the United States Department of War preferred rail transport for security reasons, completed rifles were shipped out via the Wood River Branch Railroad from Hope Valley. The U.S. soon entered the war, but little benefit came to the railroad, as lumbering was curtailed by many men being drafted into the military and little military production took place in the rural Hope Valley area.

Freight volumes had begun to decline during the war, and this intensified following the war's conclusion in 1945 when the area's few remaining textile mills largely switched to truck transport. Rawlings paid for the company's deficits, considering the railroad a loss leader for his mill. He was optimistic that grain business would increase, as Rhode Island's biggest poultry producer operated in neighboring Wyoming.

=== Demise and legacy ===
On March 14, 1947, the Rawlings grain mill was completely destroyed by a fire. Hope Valley's fire chief responded moments after receiving the phone call, summoning seven fire companies, but they could do little more than protect nearby buildings. The grain was highly flammable, and flames reportedly grew to several hundred feet in height. Once the fire burned itself out, losses were estimated at $100,000 (equivalent to $1,210,000 in 2021). While these were mostly covered by insurance, the 64-year-old Rawlings decided to call it quits. The mill accounted for most of the Wood River Branch Railroad's traffic, and to make matters worse both the Centerville Mill and Bitgood's sawmill were also destroyed by fires shortly afterwards. The sole remaining customer of any significance was the Howard C. Woodmansee Coal and Oil Company; with the overwhelming majority of its traffic lost, the Wood River Branch had no choice but to close.

Rawlings first offered the company to any buyers, hoping someone would use the land along the railroad for development. This time, there was no one left to save the Wood River Branch Railroad. Therefore, following the company's request, and with the ICC noting no objections, the agency granted permission to abandon the line on August 8, 1947. After one final round trip on the President's Special, the railroad came to an end.

The company was overwhelmed with offers to purchase the line for salvage and the reuse of its rails on other railroads, with Rawlings telling a Connecticut newspaper: "Practically every junk dealer in the country wants to buy it." Lucy Rawlings Tootell signed a contract with the Providence-based Metals Processing Company in October, which paid the company $26,559 (equivalent to $322,000 in 2021) for the right to salvage the line, including rails, bridges, and the company's section car. (Note: Rawlings actually ended up with a profit on the line; between the $301 purchase and $24,115 in operating losses, he netted $2,143 on the sale.) The 1872 and the caboose were given back to the New Haven; the former found a new home at a Connecticut coal distributor. Scrapping began in November, and the rails and bridges were salvaged and resold elsewhere, but the ties were not valuable enough to justify resale and were instead abandoned along the line.

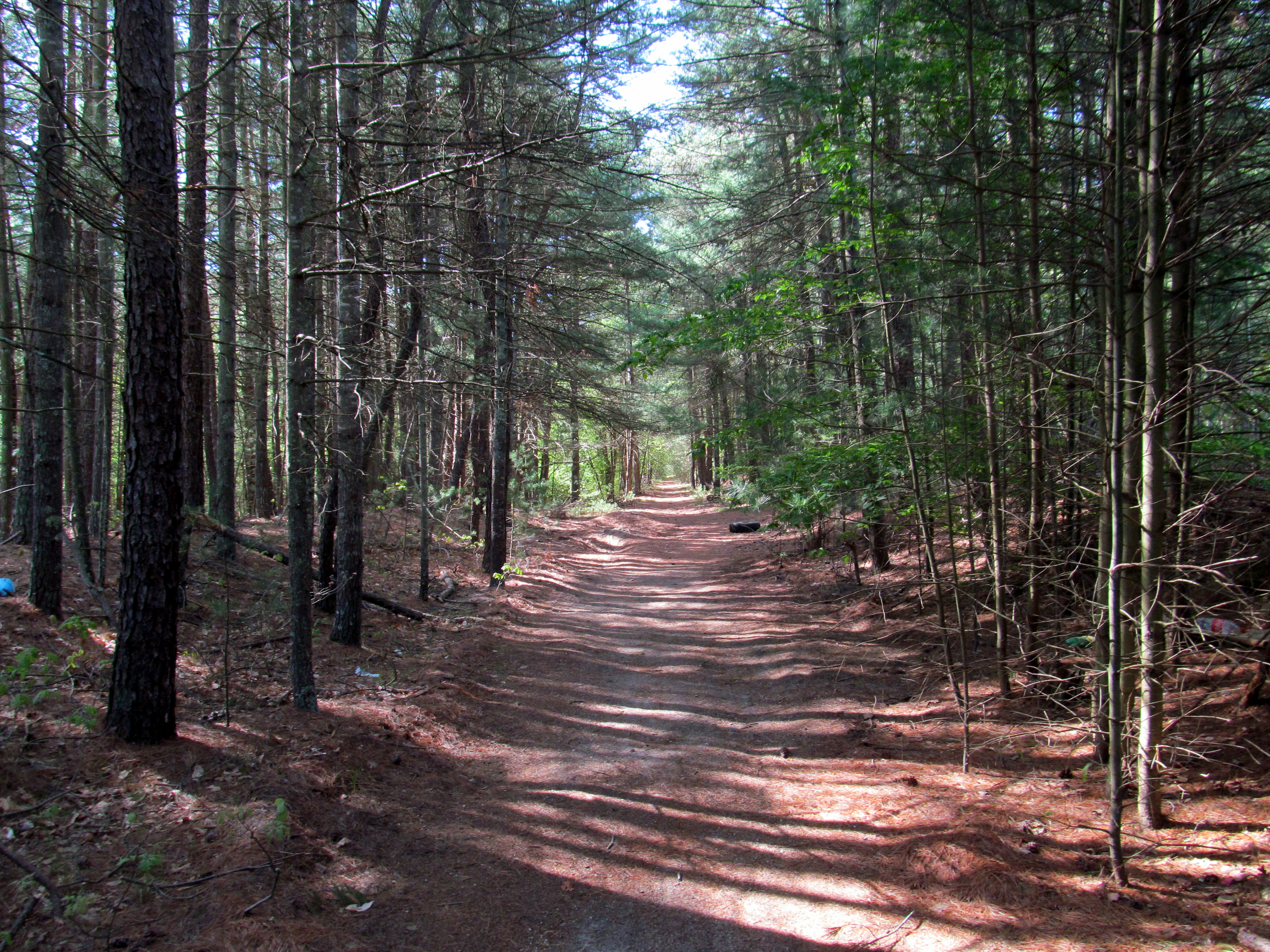
The former right-of-way of the Wood River Branch Railroad in Wood River Junction, seen in 2017

Portions of the railroad's right-of-way remain extant in the form of a rail trail as of 2018, and the abutments and a pier from a Wood River Branch Railroad bridge remain in the Wood River. Some segments of the right-of-way have been reused for streets. A handful of preserved mill buildings that were once railroad customers survive as of 2017.

== Accidents and incidents ==
A man was accused of attempting to derail a Wood River Branch train on April 14, 1897. It was alleged William H. Baton had placed a railroad tie over the tracks, which was later struck by a train; the train was not derailed as the tie was caught in the locomotive's cowcatcher. A jury found Baton not guilty of placing a tie on the tracks.

A fatal accident, the first in the company's history, occurred on May 25, 1914. A local resident was traveling across the bridge over the Wood River on foot, despite being warned a train was due. A southbound train from Hope Valley rounded a curve near the bridge, and could not stop in time to avoid a collision. The man, Ernest Peter Palmer, was struck and thrown into the river. Though the train's crew dove into the river and recovered his body, a coroner later determined he was killed upon impact.

== Locomotives ==
The Wood River Branch Railroad's first locomotive was the Gardner Nichols, named after Amos G. Nichols' father. Weighing 23 short tons (21 long tons; 21 t), it was a 4-4-0 wood-burning locomotive built new by the Rhode Island Locomotive Works for the line. Purchased directly by Nichols, it was first leased to the railroad before Nichols agreed to sell it for company bonds. It ran on the Wood River Branch until 1906, when it was sold to a lumber company in the Southern United States.

Locomotive number 2, named Wincheck, joined the Gardner Nichols as the second locomotive, purchased in 1883 from the Narragansett Pier Railroad. Originally built in 1872, Wincheck was retired in 1896 when its annual inspection found the boiler too worn out to continue operating. By 1898 Wincheck was described as a scrap heap, but it was not scrapped until 1906.

Locomotive number 5, (Note: Numbered out of order; the Wood River Branch never had locomotives numbered 3, 4, 7, or 8.) unofficially named Polly by the Wood River Branch's employees, was purchased used from the Long Island Rail Road in April 1896. Acquired to replace Wincheck, Polly was a 40-short-ton (36-long-ton; 36 t) 2-4-4T (known as a Forney locomotive) built by the Baldwin Locomotive Works, and developed a reputation for frequently breaking down and having accidents. This locomotive was sold for scrap in November 1915.

Cinderella, a second locomotive of a similar design to Polly, was acquired used from the New Haven in 1904, and noted for being equipped with air brakes. Cinderella was scrapped in 1919 when the USRA decided it was not worth completing extensive needed repairs on the 32-year-old engine.

Locomotive 10, never given a name, was brought to the Wood River Branch in April 1918 during federal control of the railroads. The ex-New Haven locomotive was assigned to the railroad permanently when the USRA returned the Wood River Branch to its owners in 1920.

The A100, renumbered 1872 by Roy Rawlings (and unofficially named Miss Hope Valley), was a newly-built, 20-short-ton (18-long-ton; 18 t) 0-4-0 Plymouth Locomotive Works gas locomotive, ordered by the New Haven for $8,483 (equivalent to $134,000 in 2021) and leased to the Wood River Branch Railroad. With four gears in forward and reverse, it could run at full speed (15 miles per hour or 24 km/h) in either direction. This was necessary as by this point the railroad had no turntable; the locomotive therefore always faced south. The New Haven reclaimed 1872 when the Wood River Branch shut down in 1947, and it was then sold to a coal dealer in Stratford, Connecticut.

== Station listing ==
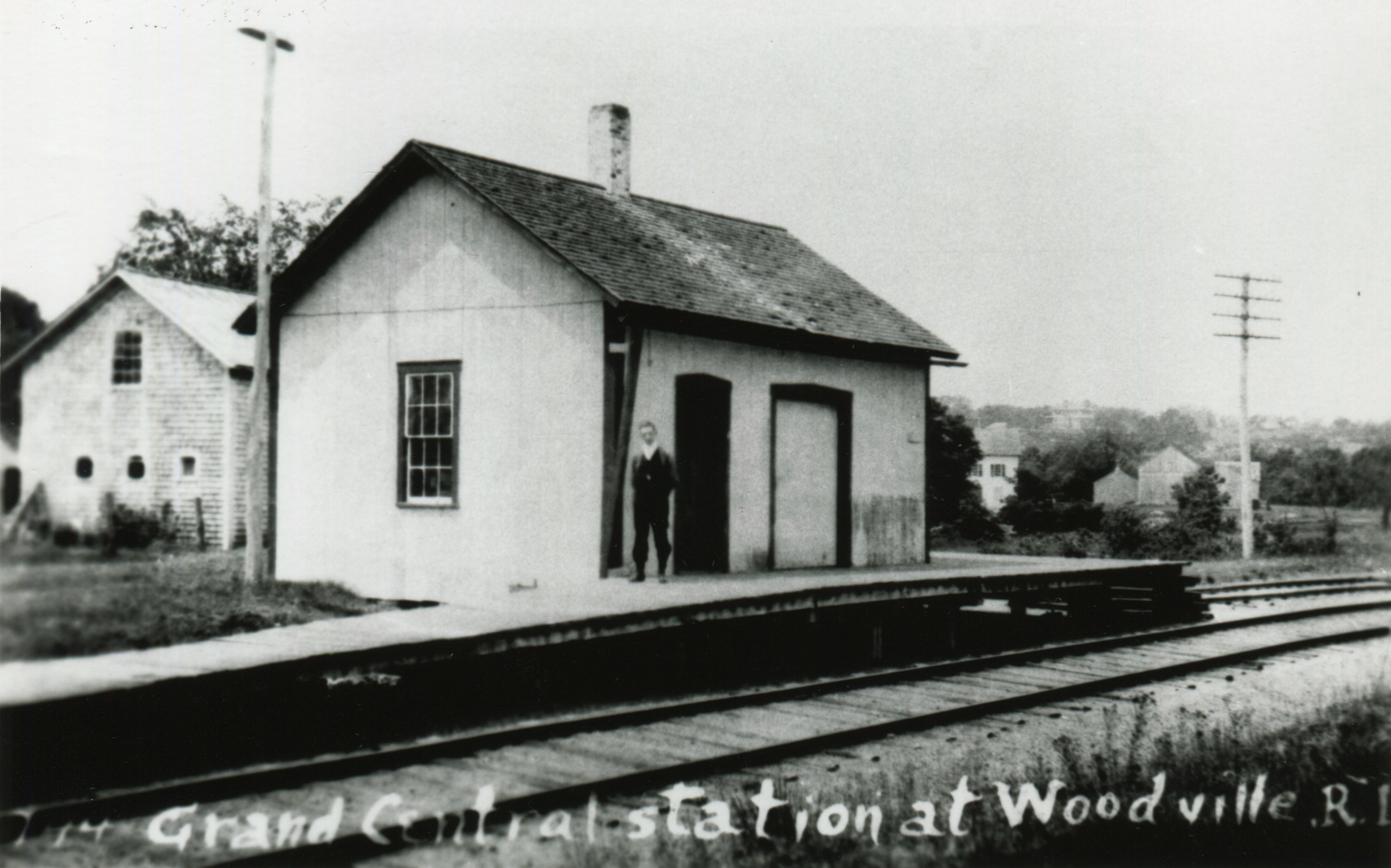
Woodville station, labeled "Grand Central Station at Woodville, R.I." This c. 1910 photo includes station agent I.B. Miller.

List of stations along the Wood River Branch Railroad
Station	Distance from Wood River Junction	Comments
Wood River Junction	0.0 miles (0.0 km)	Southern terminus, connection with the New York, Providence and Boston/New York, New Haven and Hartford
Woodville	2.3 miles (3.7 km)	Flag stop from July 1910 onward
Canonchet	3.7 miles (6.0 km)	Flag stop
Crossing	5.3 miles (8.5 km)	Flag stop
Hope Valley	5.6 miles (9.0 km)	Northern terminus

== See also ==
- Moshassuck Valley Railroad
- Narragansett Pier Railroad
- Warwick Railway
