= Roy Willard Rawlings =

American politician

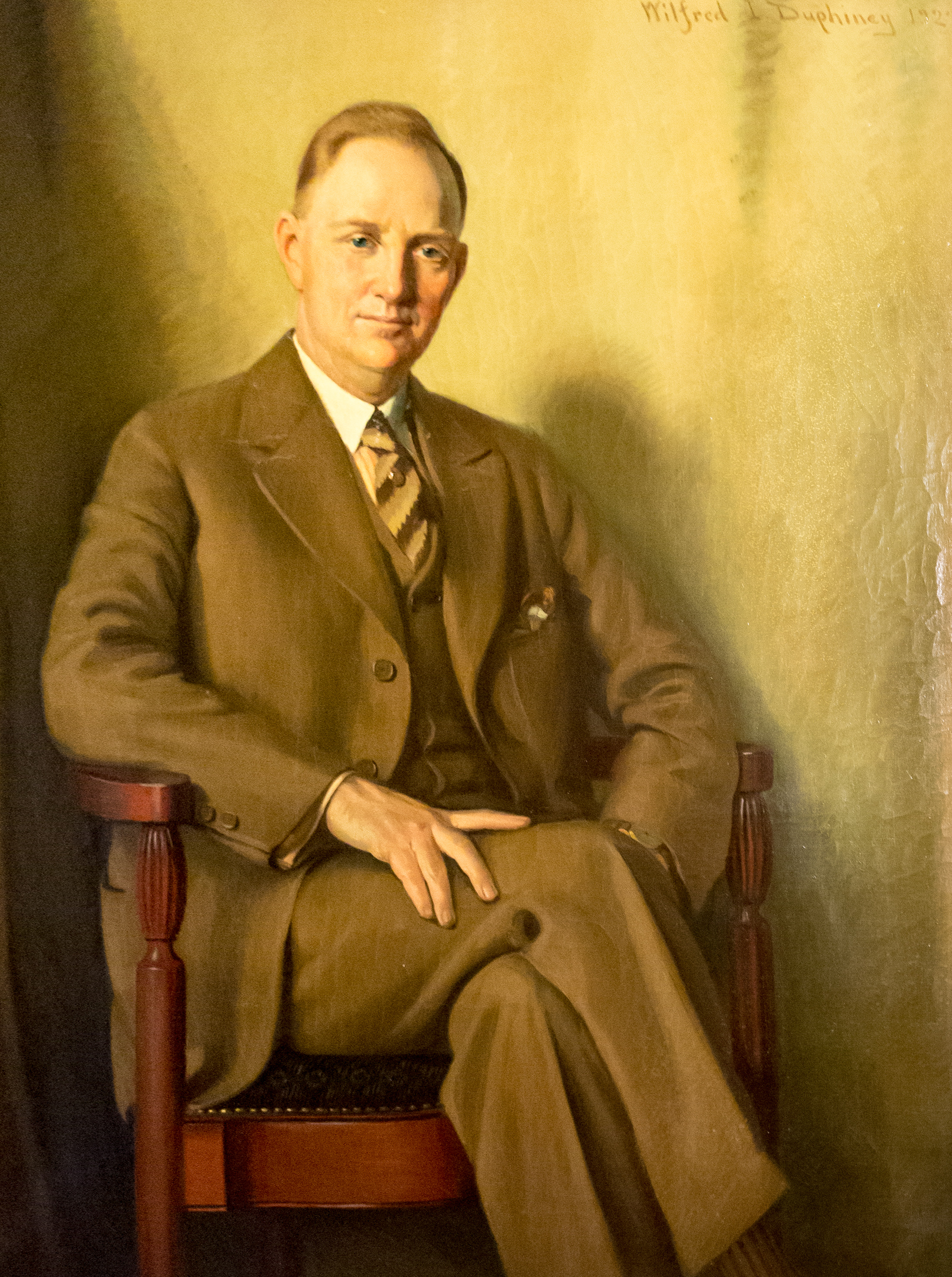
Painted portrait of Roy Rawlings by Wilfred I. Duphiney

Roy Willard Rawlings (March 8, 1883 – 1973) was an American politician in Rhode Island. A Republican, was a member of the Rhode Island House of Representatives from 1923 to 1934. He held the speakership from 1927 to 1933.

== Life and career ==
Rawlings was born on March 8, 1883, in Franklin, Illinois, to parents John H. Rawlings and Martha K. Seymour. He graduated DePauw University in 1908, and married Lucy I. Gammell later that year. The Rawlings family moved from Illinois to Rhode Island in 1913, a year after Rawlings and his wife had acquired the Lillibridge Plantation from Albert and Susie Watson. His son Rob Roy Rawlings and daughter Lucy Rawlings Tootell also served in government.

Rawlings, a Republican, was a member of the Rhode Island House of Representatives between 1923 and 1934, and served as speaker of the Rhode Island House from 1927 to 1933. He won the speakership when Democratic lawmakers crossed the floor to vote for him.

Rawlings was a stage actor and tax assessor before serving in the Rhode Island House. He lived in Richmond and later West Kingston.

After concluding his time as house speaker, Rawlings purchased the Wood River Branch Railroad in 1937 for $301. He served as president until the line ceased operations in 1947.
