= Burdett College =

Educational institution

- Type: Private
- Active: 1879–1999
- Founders: Charles A. Burdett; Fred H. Burdett
- President: Charles Burdett; Fred Burdett; Sadie Burdett; C. Fred Burdett (c.1935–1970)
- Location: Boston, Lynn, and Worcester, Massachusetts, United States

Burdett College, also known as Burdett Business College or Burdett College of Business and Shorthand, was an educational institution primarily located in Boston, Massachusetts. Founded in 1879, it focused on business and shorthand and operated as a junior college. It closed in 1999.

== History ==
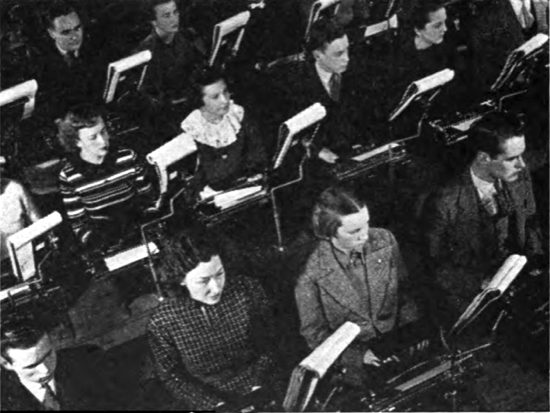
Students at Burdett College, c. 1938

The college was founded on August 1, 1879, by brothers Charles A. Burdett (1858–1922) and Fred H. Burdett (1861–1935). They each served as president of the college, followed by Fred's wife, Sadie. Fred and Sadie's son, C. Fred Burdett (c.1905–1988), was then president from the mid-1930s until 1970.

In 1938, the institution was described a junior college of business training, offering one- and two-year courses of study in the areas of business administration, accounting, executive secretarial, stenographic, and general business.

Upon C. Fred Burdett's retirement in 1970, the college was sold to the Bradford School Corporation, a subsidiary of The Life Insurance Company of Virginia. The website for the Massachusetts Department of Higher Education lists the college as having closed in 1999. Bay State College in Boston is the custodian of records for several closed institutions, including Burdett College.

== Locations ==
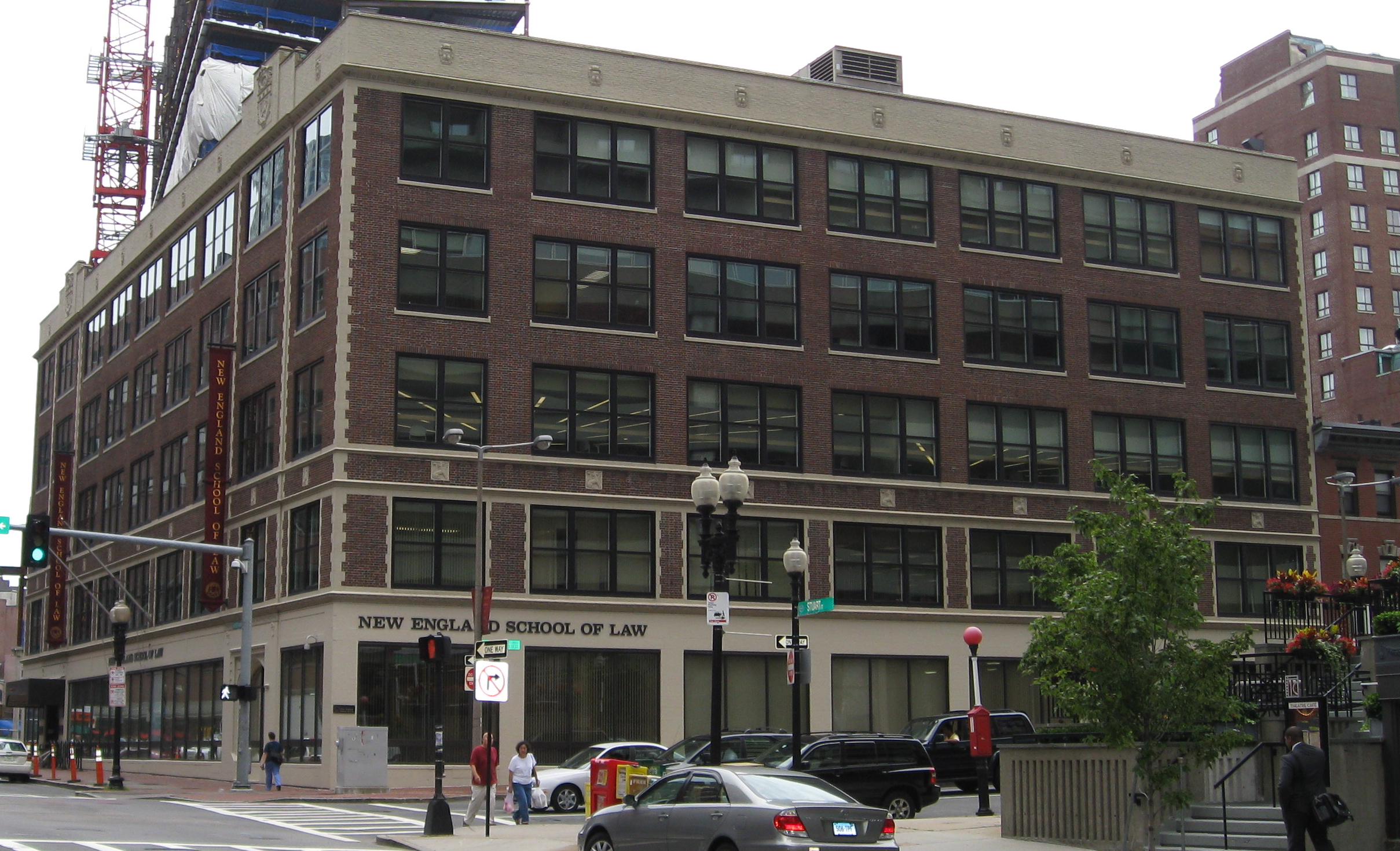
156 Stuart Street, now home to New England Law Boston

Locations of Burdett College included:

- 167 Tremont Street, Boston (1882–1885)
- 592 Washington Street, Boston (1886–1891)
- 694 Washington Street, Boston (1891–1904)
- 18 Boylston Street, Boston (1905–1928)
- 156 Stuart Street, Boston (1928–1954)
- 160 Beacon Street, Boston (1954–1972)
- 745 Boylston Street, Boston (c. 1998)
- 74 Mt. Vernon Street, Lynn, Massachusetts (c. 1939)
- 100 Front Street, Worcester, Massachusetts (c. 1999)

== Alumni ==
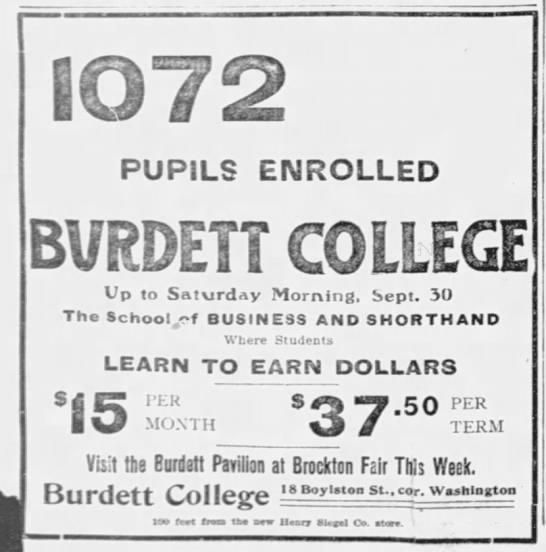
Advertisement from The Boston Globe of October 1, 1905

Notable alumni of the college include:

- Garrett H. Byrne, District Attorney of Suffolk County, Massachusetts
- John F. Cotter, Commissioner of the Boston Fire Department
- Joseph N. Hermann, Massachusetts politician
- William E. Hurley, Massachusetts politician
- Clementina Poto Langone, Italian-American activist, politician, and philanthropist
- John Shea (New Hampshire politician)
- Hal Weafer, major league baseball umpire
- Grafton Kenyon, Rhode Island businessman and politician

== Athletics ==
The college fielded teams in several sports, including:

- Baseball – c.1894–c.1902
- Basketball – c.1948–c.1962
  - In 1957, the team won the Boston Small College title, with a 10–0 record.
- Football – c.1895–c.1905
  - Opponents included Phillips Exeter Academy, New Hampshire, and MIT.
- Ice polo – c.1896
  - Note: a form of ice hockey played with a ball rather than a puck
