= Grafton Kenyon =

American businessman

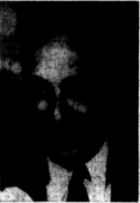
- Kenyon in 1913

Member of the Rhode Island Senate from South Kingstown
- In office January 2, 1917 – 1919
- Preceded by: Rowland Hazard III

Member of the Rhode Island House of Representatives from South Kingstown
- In office 1913–1915

Personal details
- Born: Grafton Irving Kenyon; March 18, 1882 South Kingstown, Rhode Island, U.S.
- Died: January 16, 1960 (aged 77) South Kingstown, Rhode Island, U.S.
- Resting place: Riverside Cemetery, Wakefield, Rhode Island
- Party: Democratic
- Education: Burdett College (no degree)

Military service
- Branch/service: Rhode Island State Guard
- Years of service: 1916–1919
- Rank: Captain
- Unit: South Kingstown, Second Company
- Battles/wars: World War I

Grafton Irving Kenyon (March 18, 1882 – January 16, 1960) was an American businessman, politician, and military officer from South Kingstown, Rhode Island, who served as a member of both the Rhode Island House of Representatives and the Rhode Island Senate. Kenyon was the first Scoutmaster in Rhode Island, serving as the first Scoutmaster of Troop 1, Wakefield, the oldest Boy Scout Troop in the state.

== Early life ==
Grafton Kenyon was born on March 18, 1882, in Wakefield, a village of South Kingstown in Washington County, Rhode Island. He was the oldest of three children born to Orrin P. Kenyon and Fannie Gorton Kenyon. His father owned Kenyon's Department Store, on the intersection of Main Street and Kenyon Avenue.

Kenyon attended South Kingstown, High School and graduated in 1901, he then attended the Burdett Business College in Boston, Massachusetts, which he graduated from in 1902, completing a general commercial course but receiving no degree.

Following his graduation from Burdett College, Kenyon returned to South Kingstown and worked for the O.P. Kenyon Company at his father's department store. Kenyon was elected as the secretary and assistant treasurer of O.P. Kenyon, Inc., and served as the director of the Wakefield Trust Company.

Kenyon married Mary Louise Burns in 1914 and the two remained married until her death in 1945. The two had two children together, Jane Burns Kenyon Caffrey and Orrin Potter Kenyon II.

Kenyon is a direct descendant of Samuel Gorton, who founded Rhode Island along with Roger Williams.

== Political and military career ==
=== Political career ===
Kenyon initially wanted to avoid public office, but was pressured to run by members of South Kingstown due to being well known and active in public affairs. In 1912, Kenyon was elected as a representative to the Rhode Island General Assembly in 1912, and served in the 1913–1914 legislative session. Kenyon served on the Joint Committee on Engrossed Acts, the House Committee on Labor Legislation, and the House Committee on Agriculture and Mechanical Arts.

In 1916, Kenyon was elected as a senator to the Rhode Island Senate and served in the 1917–1918 legislative session. Kenyon served on the Senate Committee on the Militia and the Senate Committee on Rules and Order.

Kenyon was offered the nomination to run for United States Representative in Rhode Island's second congressional district against incumbent Republican Representative Walter R. Stiness. Kenyon declined, and instead Stephen J. Casey was chosen as the Democratic nominee in the 1918 U.S. House of Representatives election. Kenyon was also offered the nomination to run for Lieutenant Governor against Republican incumbent Emery J. San Souci, but again declined the offer.

=== Military career ===
In 1916, Kenyon went to Plattsburgh, New York and attended military training at the Officer Training Camp. Kenyon was commissioned with the rank of captain and returned home to take command of the Second Company of South Kingstown, a section of the Rhode Island State Guard. Kenyon served as the captain of the second company until 1919, when World War I ended and the Rhode Island State Guard was deactivated. Under Kenyon's leadership, the Second Company was rated the best united in the entire Rhode Island State Guard. Because of this, the Second Company was often referred to as the "crack company" by members of South Kingstown, in the meaning that it was highly functional and operated smoothly.

The Second Company was often deployed to Fort Kearny during World War I.

=== Rhode Island Boy Scouts ===
In 1909, former Rhode Island Senator, member of the South Kingstown Town Council, and friend of Kenyon's, Rowland G. Hazard III, established Troop 1, Wakefield, the first Boy Scout Troop in Rhode Island, after finding his younger brother Thomas P. Hazard drinking and smoking underage. Hazard appointed Kenyon to serve as the Troop's first Scoutmaster to instill discipline in the Scouts. Kenyon appointed Thomas Hazard as the Troop's first Senior Patrol Leader. Kenyon served until 1915, before retiring to take a position on the Rhode Island Boy Scouts council, until it was merged with Boy Scouts of America in 1917, where he then served on the Narragansett Council until 1922.

== Later life ==
Kenyon was a member of the Freemasons, of which he was part of the Royal Arch Masons, the Knights Templar, and the Scottish Rite. Kenyon was also a member of the Palestine Temple of the Ancient Arabic Order of the Nobles of the Mystic Shrine. Kenyon also served as the first president of the South Kingstown Chamber of Commerce and was one of the founding members of South County Hospital. Kenyon served on the Washington County Draft Board and the Rhode Island State Council of Defense during World War II. In 1932, Kenyon was appointed chair of the Washington County chapter of the National Rifle Association of America.

Kenyon died on January 16, 1960, in his home on Kenyon Avenue, South Kingstown, Rhode Island. Kenyon is buried in Riverside Cemetery in Wakefield.
