= Michael Woodmansee =

American child murderer (born 1958)

- Born: July 16, 1958 (age 68)
- Status: Released after 28 years (time off for good behavior) with a voluntary commitment to Eleanor Slater Hospital in Cranston, Rhode Island, in the fall of 2011
- Conviction: Second degree murder
- Penalty: Imprisonment for 40 years

Michael Everett Woodmansee (born July 16, 1958) is an American child murderer. He was a sixteen-year-old junior at South Kingstown High School in the state of Rhode Island on May 18, 1975, when he murdered Jason Foreman, a five-year-old who lived nearby in South Kingstown. He was not convicted of the murder until 1983, when he confessed to the crime upon questioning about the attempted strangulation of another child. He was a large boy and preferred to spend most of his time alone. He lived with his father Franklin Woodmansee, a police reservist, on Schaeffer Street in the village of Peace Dale.

== Disappearance of Jason Foreman ==
On May 18, 1975, the day Jason disappeared, he had been out playing with his older brother and three other boys. After announcing to his playmates that he was going home, he ran toward the Peace Dale Volunteer fire station located at the bottom of the hill on High Street. Jason lived in the Peace Dale section of South Kingstown on High Street not more than 30 yards up the hill on the same side as the fire house. Foreman's house was directly across the street from Woodmansee's. Jason's mother, Joice Foreman, last heard her son's laughter through the open window, at approximately 3:30 in the afternoon. He never made it home. It was Joice's 25th birthday.

== Arrest and conviction ==
Jason Foreman's murder went unsolved until Woodmansee was apprehended on April 15, 1982, for a different crime. He had lured a 14-year-old paperboy (Dale Sherman) into his house, and supplied him with alcohol. After Woodmansee made an unsuccessful attempt to strangle him, the boy made it home and recounted the incident to his father, who became enraged, confronted Woodmansee, and then punched him. Woodmansee's father saw the police leaving from the Sherman home, waved the officer over, and complained to the police about the attack upon his son. The officer requested that they both come down to the police station to talk about the incident. During the interrogation with Woodmansee regarding the alleged attack upon the Sherman boy, the officers had a hunch that he might know something about the disappearance of Jason Foreman. Slowly they steered the interrogation that way and ultimately Woodmansee confessed to killing Jason Foreman. He told the police that when they searched his room they would find a journal but that everything in the journal was purely fiction. When police searched Woodmansee's room, they not only found the journal but also found Foreman's skull and several other bones on his dresser. The bones had been picked clean of all flesh and shellacked. Woodmansee pleaded guilty to second degree murder in 1983, and was sentenced to 40 years in prison as a result of a plea bargain. The prosecutor negotiated the plea bargain to avoid the gruesome facts about the murder being exposed during the trial.

== Early release ==
The "Good Time Law" in Rhode Island allows a prisoner to earn as much as 10 days off his sentence, every month, for good behavior. In the 28 years that Woodmansee was incarcerated he was able to earn back 12 years under the provision.

In May 2011, due to public uproar and the nature of the crimes committed, Woodmansee was ordered to be evaluated by two independent forensic psychiatrists who agreed Woodmansee fit the criteria to be involuntarily committed. Woodmansee and his legal counsel agreed that after his release from prison he would be voluntarily committed to Eleanor Slater Hospital in Cranston indefinitely. As of March 2021, it is unknown whether or not Woodmansee is still committed there due to privacy laws.

Woodmansee was released from prison on September 11, 2011, after having served 28 years of the 40-year sentence and was immediately committed to the state hospital.
