= Over the Garden Wall (1919 film) =

1919 silent romantic comedy film by David Smith

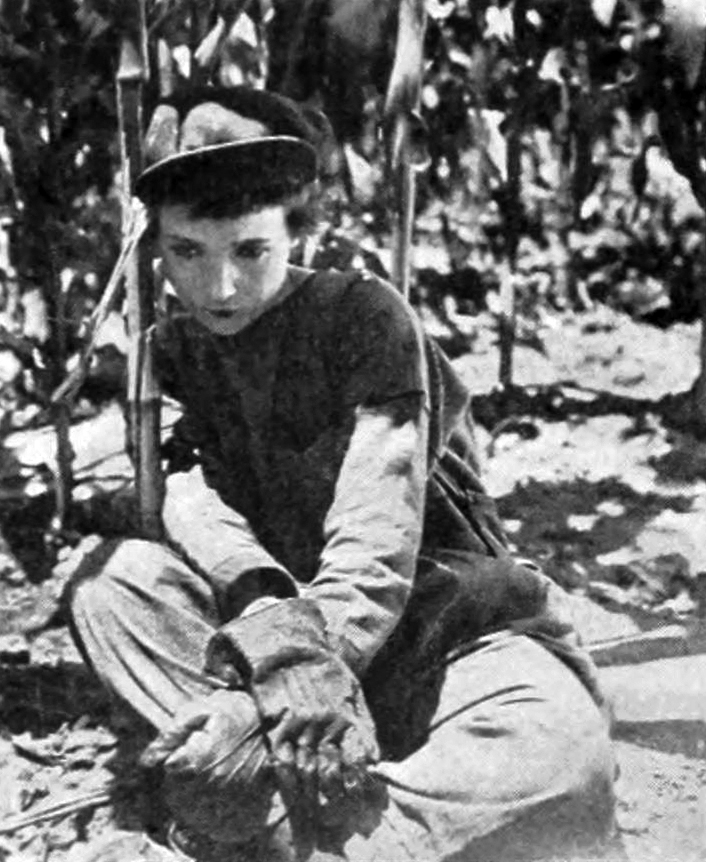
- Bessie Love as Peggy Gordon
- Directed by: David Smith
- Written by: Sam Taylor
- Based on: Over the Garden Wall (novel) by Millicent Evison
- Produced by: Albert E. Smith
- Starring: Bessie Love
- Cinematography: Clyde De Vinna
- Production company: Vitagraph Company of America
- Distributed by: Vitagraph Company of America
- Release date: September 21, 1919 (U.S.)
- Running time: 5 reels
- Country: United States
- Language: Silent (English intertitles)

Over the Garden Wall is a lost 1919 American silent romantic comedy film produced and distributed by the Vitagraph Company of America. It was directed by David Smith, brother of one of the Vitagraph founders Albert E. Smith. The film stars Bessie Love.

At least five short films with this title were filmed before this production. (Note: The five shorts are: Over the Garden Wall at IMDb (1901); Over the Garden Wall at IMDb (1910); Over the Garden Wall at IMDb (1911); Over the Garden Wall at IMDb (1913); Over the Garden Wall at IMDb (1917))

== Plot ==
When the poor Gordon family must move out of its house and into a small cottage, young Peggy Gordon becomes a gardener to earn money. Her wealthy neighbor falls in love her, after seeing her "over the garden wall" and through a tennis racket; but she mistakenly believes that he is a chauffeur. When her younger sister attempts to elope with a bad man, Peggy and her new beau successfully prevent this from happening, and her beau's wealthy identity is revealed.

== Cast ==
- Bessie Love as Peggy Gordon
- Myrtle Reeves as Frances Gordon
- Willis Marks as Matthew Gordon
- James Blackwell as Julius Caesar Jackson
- Edward Hearn as Stanley Davis
- Truman Van Dyke as J. Hector Greshingham
- Allan Forrest as Peter Morton
- Anne Schaefer as Mrs. Clara Morton
- Jay Morley as Eric Fairchild
- Otto Lederer as James Barstow
- Ruth Fuller Golden (undetermined role)

== Reception ==
The film was generally well received.

== See also ==
- Silent film
- Vitagraph Studios
