= The Mating (1918 film) =

Lost silent film by Frederick A. Thomson

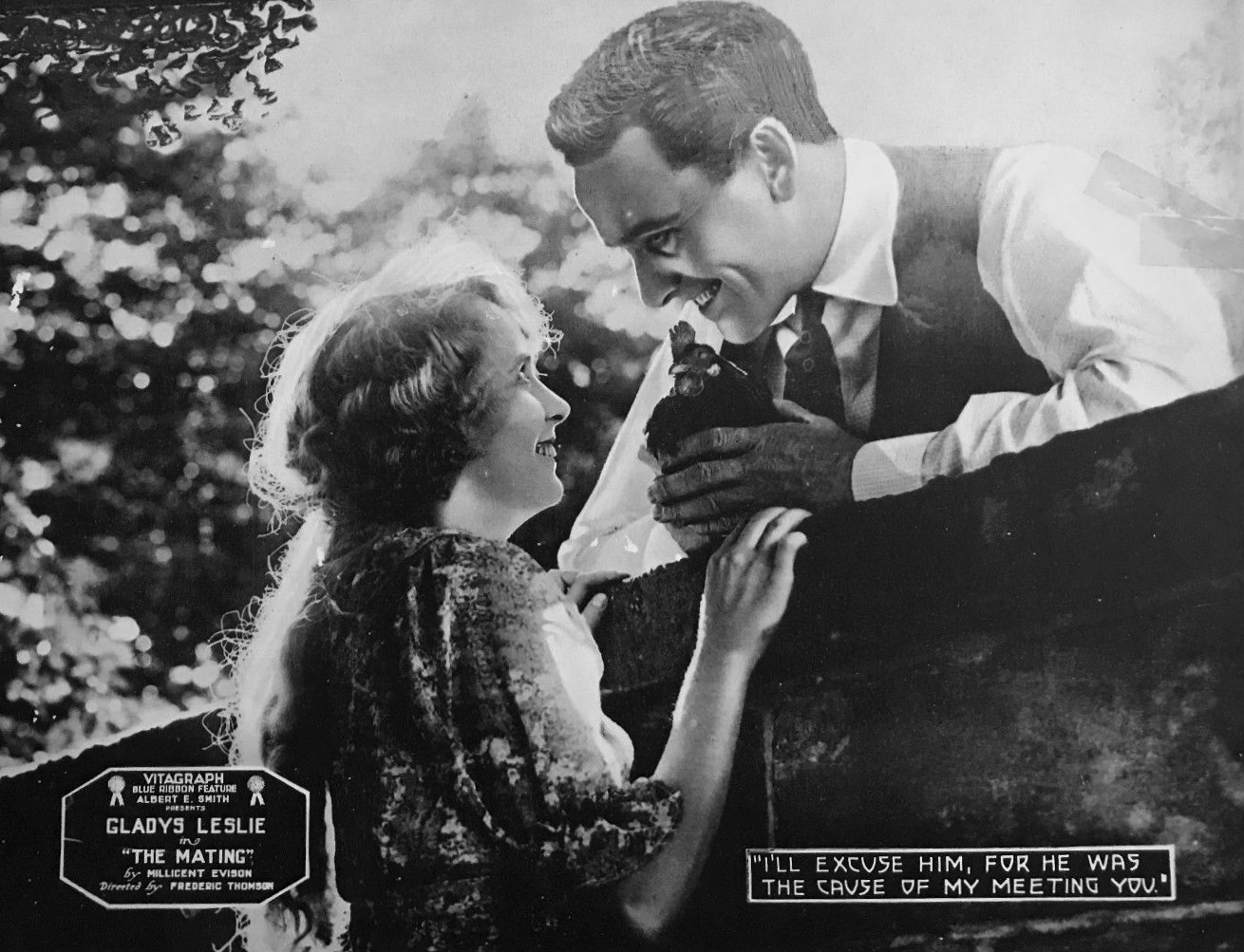
- Lobby card featuring Gladys Leslie and Herbert Rawlinson
- Directed by: Frederick A. Thomson
- Written by: A. Van Buren Powell (scenario)
- Story by: Millicent Evison
- Starring: Gladys Leslie; Herbert Rawlinson; Forrest Robinson; John Thomson; Aida Horton
- Cinematography: Jules Cronjager
- Production companies: Vitagraph Company of America; A Blue Ribbon Feature
- Distributed by: Vitagraph Company of America
- Release date: October 7, 1918
- Running time: 5 reels (approximately 75 minutes)
- Country: United States
- Languages: Silent film (English intertitles)

The Mating is a lost 1918 American silent comedy-drama film directed by Frederick A. Thomson and starring Gladys Leslie, Herbert Rawlinson, Forrest Robinson, John Thomson, and Aida Horton. The film was released by Vitagraph Company of America on October 7, 1918.

== Cast ==
- Gladys Leslie as Nancy Fanne
- Herbert Rawlinson as Dick Ives
- Forrest Robinson as Mr. Fane
- John Thomson as Bob
- Aida Horton as Betty
- Stephen Carr as Billy
- Frances Miller as Mammy
