= Moshassuck Valley Railroad =

Defunct railroad in Rhode Island

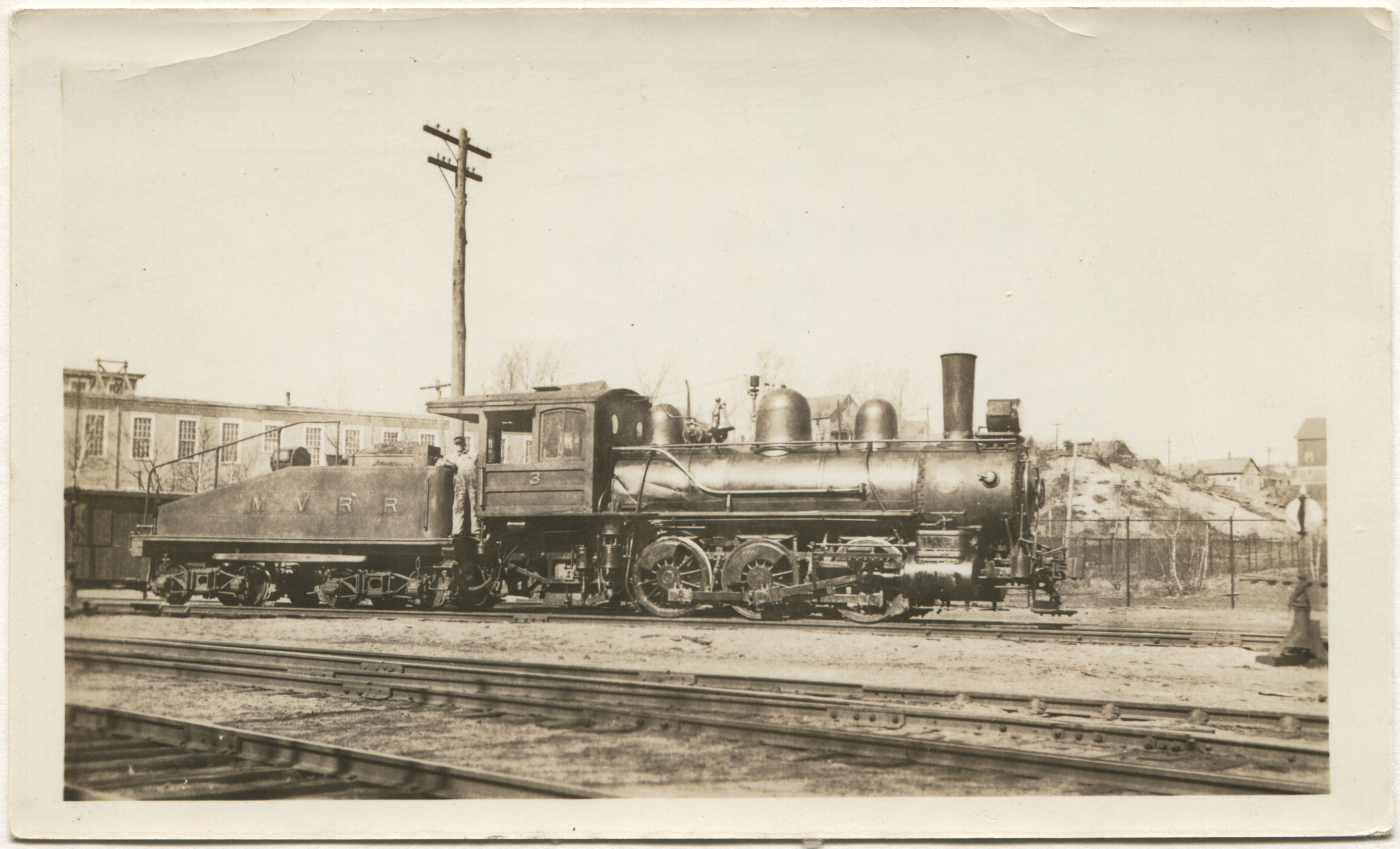
- Moshassuck Valley Railroad 3 in Lincoln in 1933

Overview
- Operator: Providence and Worcester Railroad
- Founders: William Sayles; Frederic Sayles
- Reporting mark: MOV
- Dates of operation: 1877–1982
- Successor: Providence and Worcester Railroad

Technical
- Track gauge: 4 ft 8 1/2 in (1,435 mm) standard gauge
- Length: 2 miles (3.2 km)

The Moshassuck Valley Railroad (reporting mark MOV), founded in 1874, was a shortline railroad in Rhode Island, United States. Built from 1876 to 1877, it operated on a 2-mile (3.2 km) long line between Lincoln and a connection to the Providence and Worcester and Boston and Providence railroads, both of which were subsequently purchased by the New York, New Haven and Hartford Railroad (the New Haven), in the Woodlawn neighborhood of Pawtucket. The company was formed by the Sayles brothers, owners of a significant mill in Saylesville near the line's terminus. Freight was the primary traffic of the railroad, but frequent passenger service was also provided by a self-propelled steam passenger car until 1921.

An expansion attempt southeastward from Woodlawn to the Seekonk River was launched in the first decade of the 20th century, but was abandoned in 1913 following opposition from the New Haven. Independent freight operations continued until 1982, when the company was purchased by the Providence and Worcester Railroad (which separated from New Haven successor Penn Central in 1973 and resumed operating its own lines) which has operated the line since. The northernmost three-quarters of a mile (1.21 km) of the line were abandoned in 1991, with the remainder of the line in active use as of 2022.

== History ==
=== Founding and construction ===
The Moshassuck Valley Railroad was chartered on June 11, 1874, by brothers William and Frederic Sayles, owners of a large mill in eponymous Saylesville, to connect their mill and the village to the national railroad network in Woodlawn, a neighborhood of Pawtucket. There, the Moshassuck Valley connected to the joint lines of the Providence and Worcester Railroad and the Boston and Providence Railroad, just north of Providence. The company ran a locomotive for the first time on December 6, 1876; it opened for business the following month. The completed shortline railroad was two miles (3.2 km) in length and followed the Moshassuck River for much of the route.

=== Operations ===
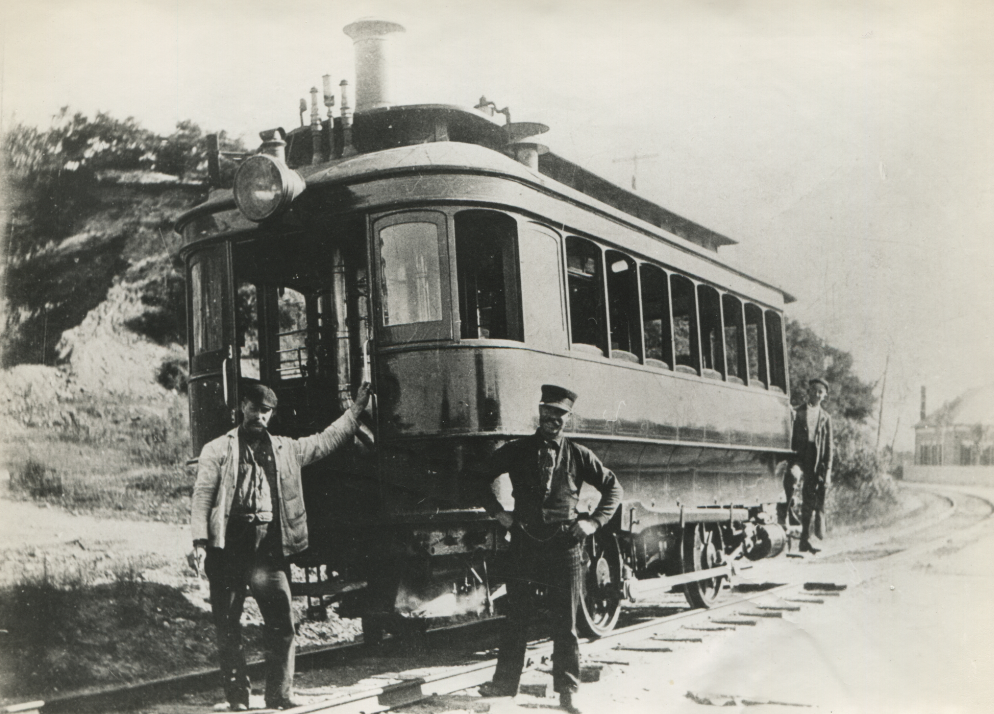
The Moshassuck Valley Railroad's steam passenger car in 1916

The Moshassuck Valley Railroad began with one locomotive, the Moshassuck. This locomotive was later supplemented by a second, the Lorraine. In 1889, the company ordered a new, more powerful locomotive from the Rhode Island Locomotive Works to replace the Moshassuck, which was no longer sufficient to handle growing freight traffic.

Though freight service was always the primary purpose of the Moshassuck Valley Railroad, the company also provided passenger service between Saylesville and the New Haven Railroad's Woodlawn depot (the New Haven was the lessor of both the Providence & Worcester and the Boston & Providence). A self-propelled steam dummy with passenger accommodations made up to 13 round trips per day on the line, which included three full stations and a further five flag stops. The Boston Globe wrote in 1903 that "There is no combination car and locomotive like the one on the Moshassuck in use in any part of this country, it is believed by the operators of this one." Passenger service continued until 1921, when it was ended following increased competition from streetcars.

In 1960, the Saylesville mill shut down. Despite this, other local industries continued to rely on the railroad, and it continued operating. By this point, the railroad had converted to diesel locomotives, rostering a GE 44-ton switcher as its main locomotive. One of the primary commodities shipped by the railroad was horse manure produced by nearby Narragansett Park By 1969, the Moshassuck Valley Railroad employed five people.

==== Expansion attempt ====
In the early 1900s, the Moshassuck Valley Railroad launched an attempt to extend its line from Woodlawn to the Seekonk River, enabling the company to exchange cargo with ships and directly compete with the New Haven. An amendment to the company's charter allowing the extension was approved by the Rhode Island General Assembly on April 7, 1904. The charter amendment required the Moshassuck to determine and acquire a right-of-way for the extension within two years, and additionally required the extension to be an electrified railroad. In April 1906, the company formally filed notice that it had obtained a right-of-way and would begin construction.

Construction of the extension did not proceed smoothly, as the New Haven Railroad objected to the route passing through land it owned at Woodlawn, asserting the land was needed for future use as part of an expansion of Northup Avenue Yard. The New Haven stated it had no objections to the expansion in principle, and would be satisfied if the extension crossed over the area of the yard on a bridge, which would need to be 200 to 300 feet in length. The Moshassuck Valley Railroad abandoned its plans to build the extension in December 1913, with newspapers speculating that this was either because the company believed the Southern New England Railway (then under construction) would allow another connection to the river, or because the company was confident in its ability to maintain good relations with the New Haven Railroad.

=== Purchase by Providence and Worcester ===
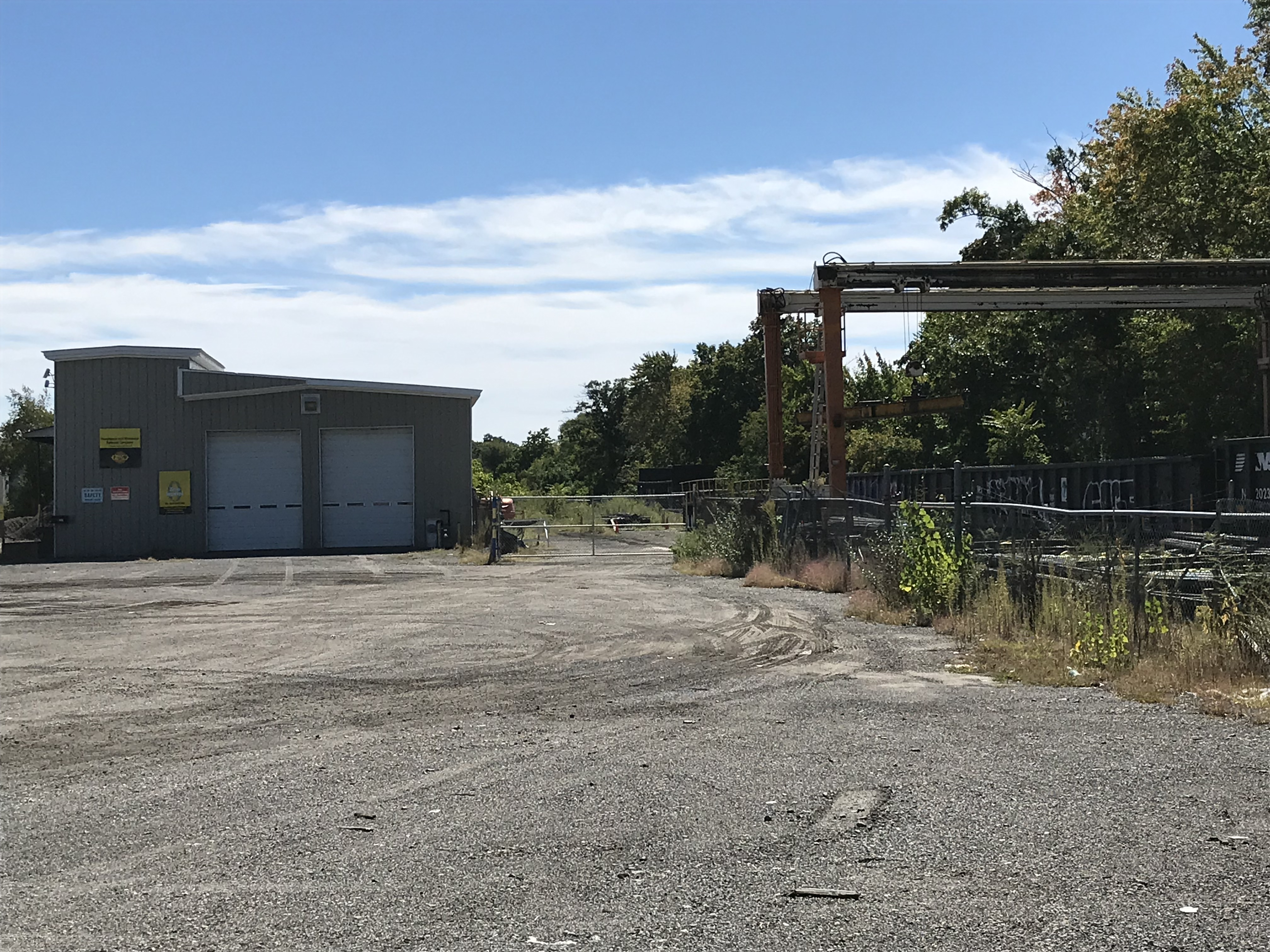
The terminus of the Moshassuck Industrial Track in 2022

In 1982, the Providence and Worcester Railroad (P&W) purchased the Moshassuck Valley Railroad, ending its independence after 105 years of continuous operations. Long leased by the New Haven, the P&W broke free from New Haven successor Penn Central in 1973 and resumed train operations. The line became the P&W's Moshassuck Industrial Track, serving several local industries. P&W cut back the northernmost three-quarters of a mile (1.21 km) of the line in 1991, while the remaining portion continues to serve a local industry as of 2022. The line is maintained to Class 1 standards, meaning a maximum speed limit of 10 miles per hour (16 km/h). The wye at Woodlawn is also used by Amtrak and P&W to turn railroad equipment.

== See also ==
- Narragansett Pier Railroad
- Warwick Railway
- Wood River Branch Railroad
