= Steam dummy =

Steam locomotive made to resemble a railroad passenger coach

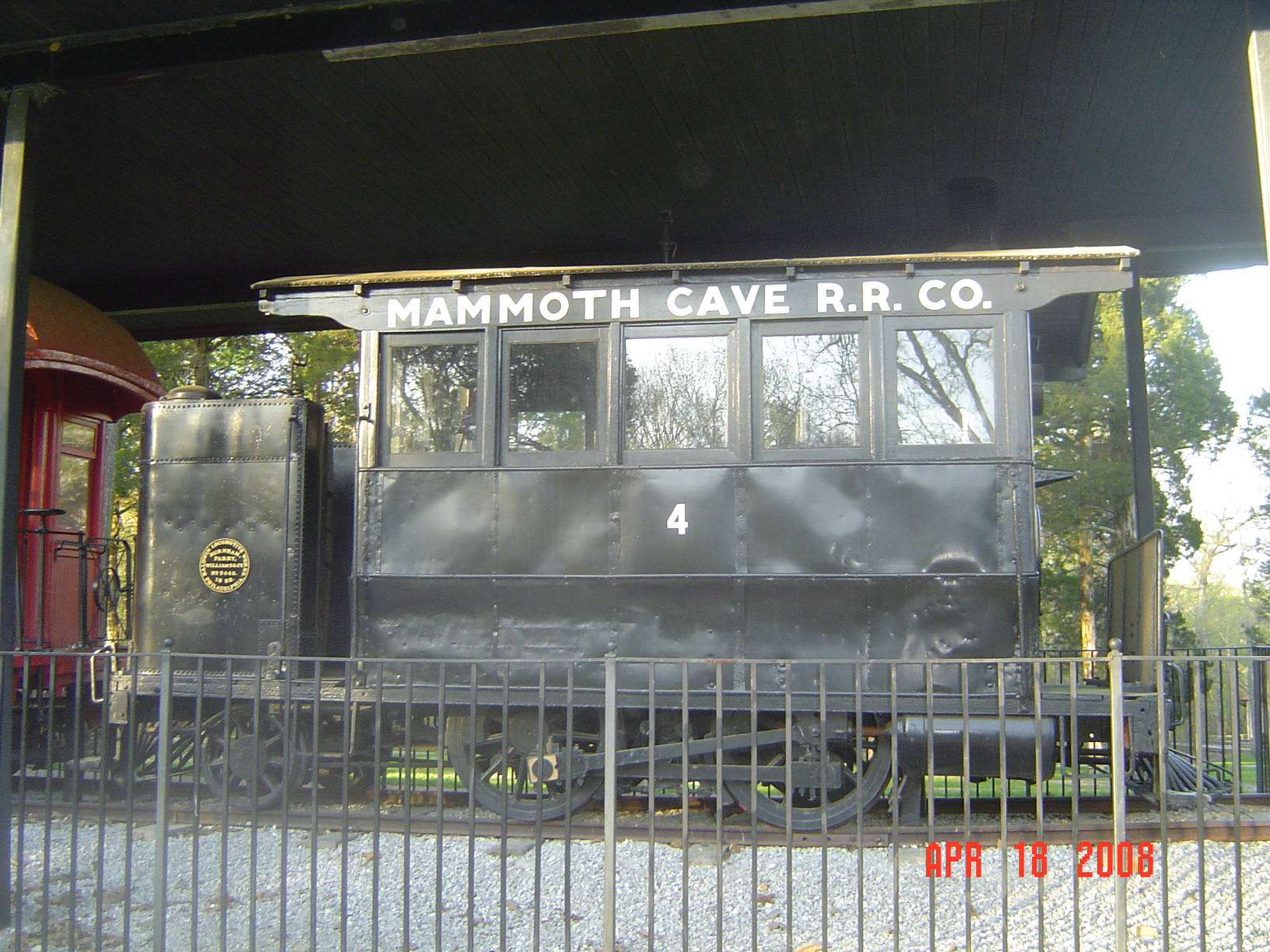
Mammoth Cave Railroad steam dummy engine

A steam dummy or dummy engine, in the United States and Canada, was a steam locomotive enclosed in a wooden box structure made to resemble a passenger railroad car. Steam dummies had some popularity in the first decades of railroading in the U.S., from the 1830s but passed from favor after the American Civil War.

== Overview ==
It was thought that the more familiar appearance of a coach presented by a steam dummy, as compared to a conventional steam locomotive, would be less likely to frighten horses when these trains had to operate in city streets. Later it was realized that it was actually the noise and motion of the operating gear of a steam engine that frightened horses, rather than the unfamiliar outlines of a steam engine.

== Production ==
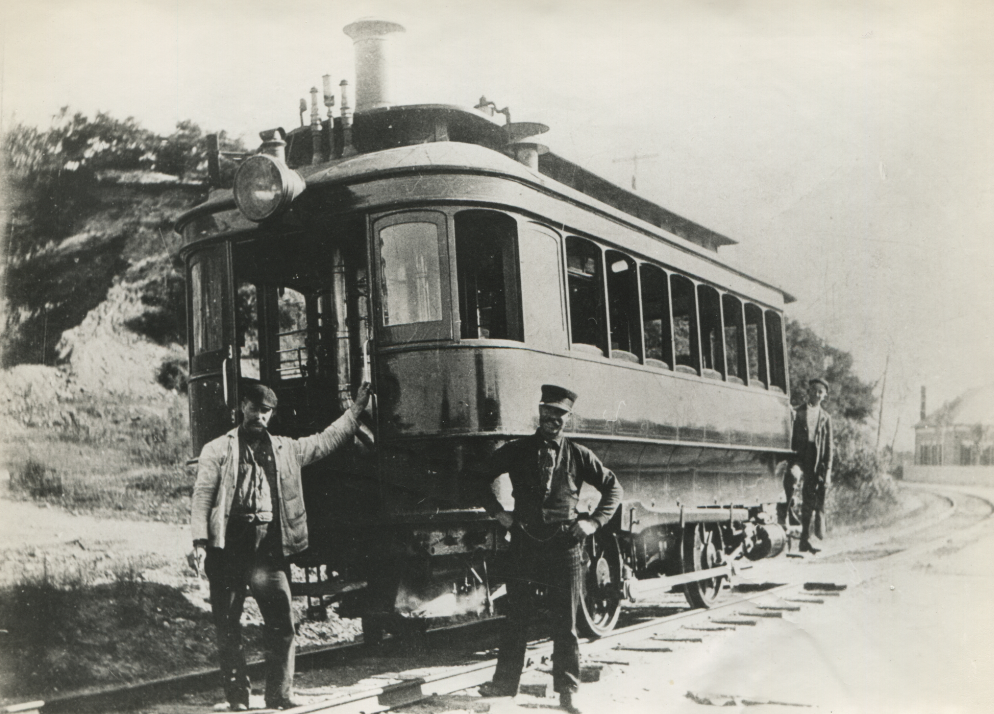
This steam passenger car operated on the Moshassuck Valley Railroad in Rhode Island. The car carried passengers and mail; the windows were not just for show. Nonetheless, the term "steam dummy" was sometimes used to describe these cars.

Baldwin Locomotive Works manufactured steam dummies or steam motors for many American tramways. Baldwin exported to places such as Australia where they were known as 'steam tram motors' – and New Zealand, where two, both built in 1891, survive at museums today. Four were imported for the 1879 Sydney International Exhibition and tracks were laid from the Redfern railway station to the Exhibition site. Intended as a temporary transport installation, this became the genesis of a larger tram network and probably the exhibition's most lasting legacy.

H. K. Porter, Inc. preferred the term "noiseless steam street motor" in their 20th-century catalog, although they used the term "dummy" (in quotes) in the 19th century. In the 20th century, they offered 0-4-0 and 0-4-2 wheel arrangements. In the 19th century, they also offered a double-ended dummy with a 2-4-2 wheel arrangement. Porter recommended using anthracite or coke as a fuel in order to avoid smoke. Side flaps to hide the mechanism were optional. Operating speeds between 15 and 25 miles per hour (24 and 40 km/h) were reported by 19th-century users.

In the UK, the Great Western Railway equipped two engines each from the 2021 and 517 classes with coach bodywork between 1906 and 1911.

== See also ==
- Doodlebug
- Multiple unit
- Steam railmotor
- Tram engine
