= Lucy Rawlings Tootell =

American politician

Martha Lucy Rawlings Tootell (November 27, 1911 – January 5, 2010) was an American schoolteacher and politician who served in the Rhode Island House of Representatives. She represented District 52 from 1973 until 1977.

== Early life ==
Martha Lucy Rawlings was born in Jacksonville, Illinois and moved with her family to Rhode Island in 1913. She was raised on the Lillibridge Plantation, property Thomas Lillibridge had acquired between 1717 and 1720. It remained in the Lillibridge family until 1904, and her parents acquired the land in 1912 from Albert and Susie Watson.

Rawlings graduated from Rhode Island College in 1933 and pursued further study at the Boston University School of Law. Prior to her career in politics, she taught at Roger Williams Junior High School in Providence and Richmond Elementary School in Richmond. In 1941, she became vice president of the Wood River Branch Railroad when her father Roy Willard Rawlings moved to Florida, a position she held until the railroad's abandonment in 1947. She was one of, if not the only woman to hold such a position at the time in the United States.

== Political career ==
Tootell was a member of the Rhode Island House of Representatives between 1973 and 1977. She was the first woman to represent district 52 in the state house. Although Frank Heppner writes that Tootell was affiliated with the Democratic Party, records kept by the government of Rhode Island state that Tootell was nominated by the Republican Party without opposition in 1972 and 1974, and faced opposition candidate Robert M. Smith in the 1972 general election, while winning reelection unopposed in 1974.

== Personal life ==
She married Fred Tootell in 1937 and they had three children. Their home in Kingston is listed on the National Register of Historic Places as Tootell House.

Her brother Rob Roy Rawlings also served in the state legislature and her father, Roy Willard Rawlings, was a Republican Speaker of the Rhode Island House. She was posthumously inducted into the Rhode Island Heritage Hall of Fame in 2013.
