= Rob Roy Rawlings =

American politician

Rob Roy Rawlings (February 20, 1920 – August 5, 2001) was an American politician.

== Early life and education ==
He was born in Westerly, Rhode Island on February 20, 1920. He studied at South Kingstown High School, the University of Rhode Island, and Duke University.

== Political career ==
Rob Roy Rawlings served in the Rhode Island Senate representing Richmond prior to re-districting. He then sought re-election as a state senator from District 25.

Although Frank Heppner writes that Rawlings was affiliated with the Republican Party, records maintained by Rhode Island's government indicate that he secured the Democratic Party nomination in 1958, 1960, 1962, and 1964. In 1966, Rawlings contested the 52nd district seat in the Rhode Island House of Representatives as a Democratic candidate, then subsequently ran for state senate from district 25 in 1968, 1970, 1972, 1974, 1976, and 1978.

== Personal life and businesses ==
Rawlings married Barbara T. Tefft and they had one son together. Rawlings predeceased his wife, who died in 2004. His son died in 2014. The elder Rawlings operated Meadow Brook Golf Club and had been the president of an eponymous grain dealer Roy Rawling Inc. His father Roy Willard Rawlings and sister Lucy Rawlings Tootell also served in state government.
