= Wilfred Israel Duphiney =

Rhode Island artist

- Born: 1884; Central Falls, Rhode Island
- Died: 1960 (aged 75–76)
- Education: Rhode Island School of Design

Wilfred Israel Duphiney (1884–1960) was an illustrator, painter, and lecturer who had a 40-year career teaching at Rhode Island School of Design and painted portraits of many prominent people in Rhode Island. His 1956 painting of Harold Brooks Tanner, a former judge in Rhode Island, is in the collection of the National Portrait Gallery.

Duphiney was born in Central Falls. He studied at the Rhode Island School of Design.

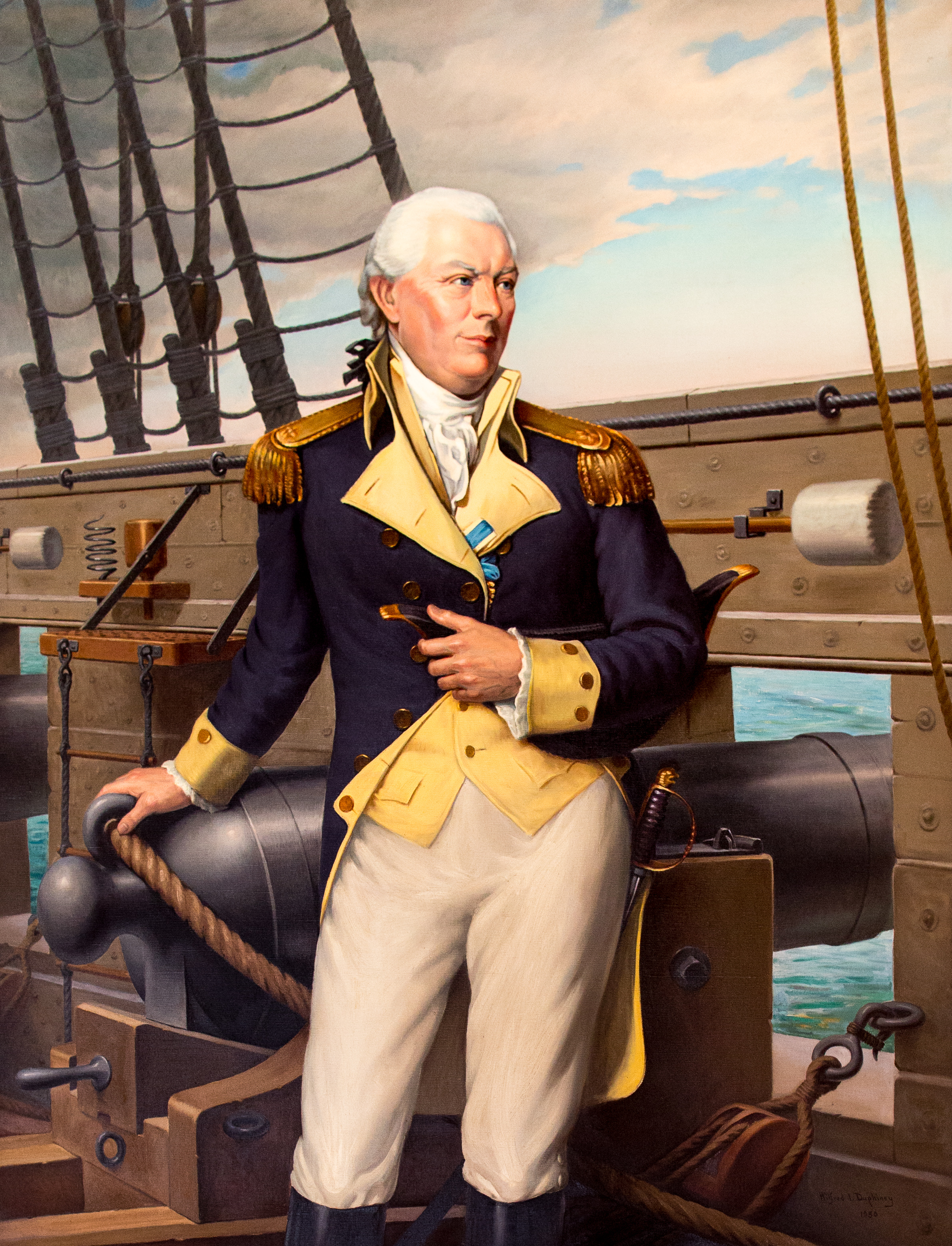
Duphiney's portrait of Commodore John Barry hangs in the Governor's Reception Room at the Rhode Island State House

== Career ==
Duphiney painted Thomas Wilson Dorr, Commodore John Barry, and many politicians. The walls of the Rhode Island State House are decorated with 15 of his paintings.

Duphiney was a member of the Providence Art Club. He was inducted into the Rhode Island Heritage Hall of Fame in 2015.
