= Narragansett Pier Railroad =

Defunct railroad in Rhode Island

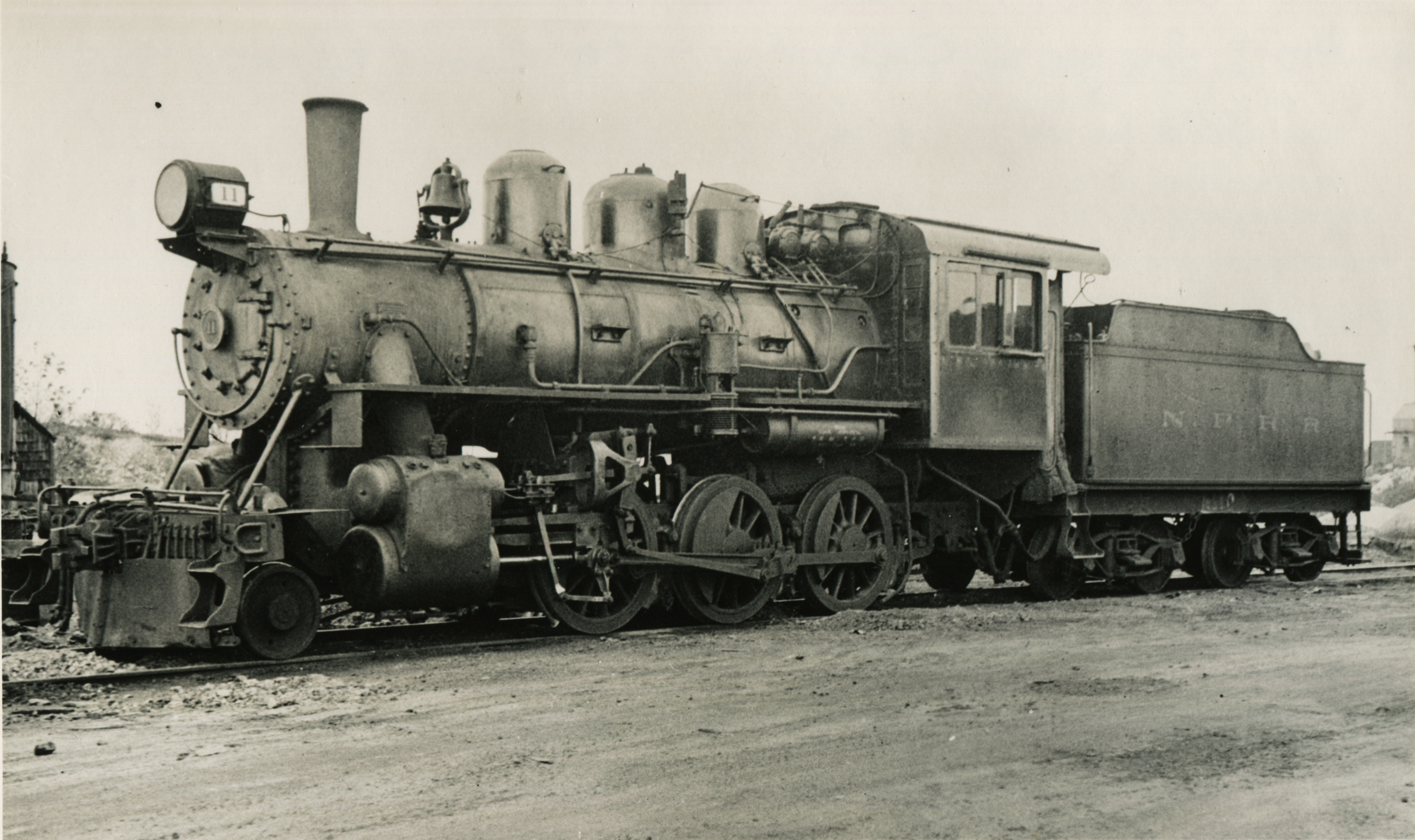
- Narragansett Pier Railroad 11, a 2-6-0, in 1934. This locomotive has been preserved at the Everett Railroad

Overview
- Headquarters: Peace Dale, Rhode Island
- Founders: Rowland G. Hazard; William Sprague IV
- Reporting mark: NAP
- Dates of operation: 1876–1981

Technical
- Track gauge: 4 ft 8 1/2 in (1,435 mm) standard gauge
- Electrification: Overhead trolley wire, 1902-1907 (Peace Dale to Narragansett Pier)
- Length: 8.5 miles (13.7 km)
- No. of tracks: 1

The Narragansett Pier Railroad (reporting mark NAP) was a railroad in southern Rhode Island, running 8.5 miles (13.7 km) from West Kingston to Narragansett Pier. It was built by the Hazard family of Rhode Island to connect their textile mills in Peace Dale to the New York, Providence and Boston Railroad at Kingston Station, as well as to ocean-going steamboats at Narragansett Pier. Upon opening in 1876, the railroad also proved crucial in the growth of Narragansett Pier into a major resort. Initially operated at a loss absorbed by the Hazards, by the 1890s the railroad became consistently profitable and handled a brisk passenger business along with freight and mail shipments. The Hazards also operated a connecting steamboat service to Newport.

The railroad's fortunes peaked around 1900; the burning of the Narragansett Pier Casino that year was a blow the resort town never fully recovered from. With competition from the newly-opened electric Sea View Railroad and automobiles alike, passenger numbers declined sharply and the Hazard family sought to exit the railroad business. The New York, New Haven and Hartford Railroad took control from the Hazards via a lease in 1911 through its streetcar subsidiary the Rhode Island Company, and the line was subsequently nationalized by the United States Railroad Administration (USRA) between 1917 and 1920. The Rhode Island Company collapsed in 1919, so the USRA returned the railroad to the Hazard family the following year.

With the Hazards back in control, the railroad adopted a number of reforms to stay competitive, including both railbus and road bus services along with a trucking business. After a financial crisis and temporary receivership in 1936, the railroad divested from non-rail operations. Steam locomotives were retired in 1937 in favor of more economical gasoline power. The Hazards exited the railroad business for good by selling to the family trust of Textron founder Royal Little in 1946. Passenger service was abolished in 1952, after which a local lumber yard agreed to purchase the railroad to ensure its continued operation as a freight-only Class III railroad, though the line was cut back from Narragansett Pier to Wakefield. A succession of later owners attempted to both grow freight business and restore passenger operations with mixed success into the 1970s. Loss of freight business forced the railroad to shut down for good in 1981.

Most of the right-of-way has been converted to the William C. O'Neill Bike Path. Several railroad structures have been preserved, along with a steam locomotive that was restored to operating status in 2015 by the Everett Railroad.

== Formation and construction ==
=== Background and formation ===
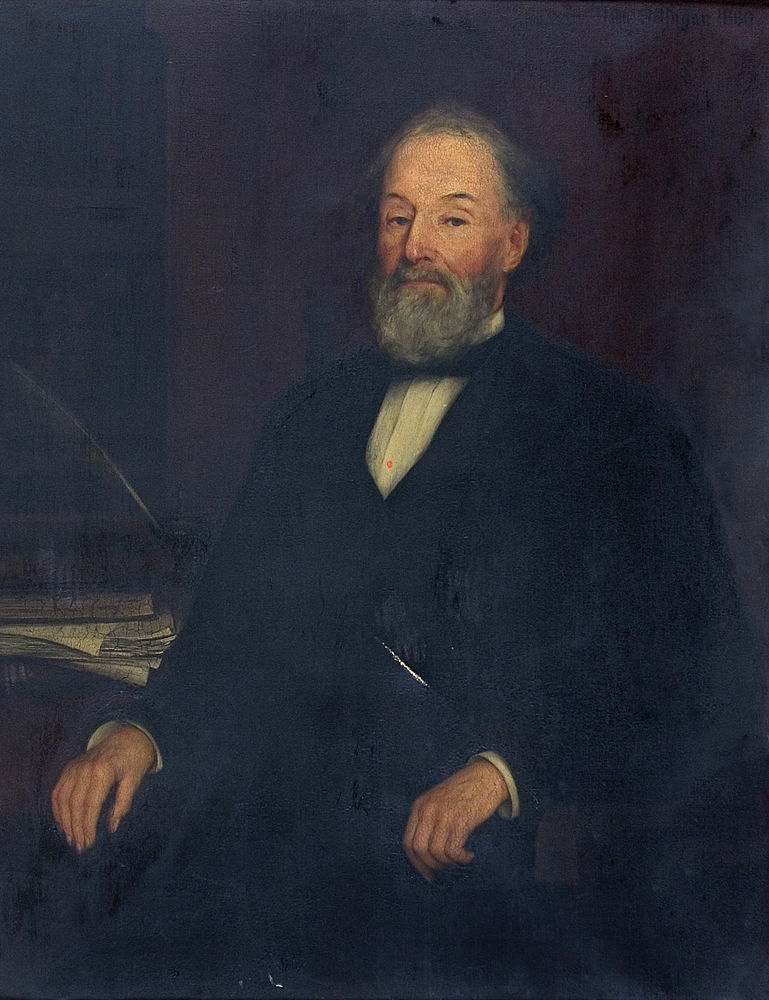
A portrait of Rowland Gibson Hazard, founder of the railroad, in 1880

The Narragansett Pier Railroad was the brainchild of Rowland G. Hazard, an industrialist and member of the prominent Hazard family of Rhode Island. In 1819, Rowland G. Hazard and his brother Isaac Peace Hazard took control of the operations of a number of textile mills in Peace Dale, Rhode Island, founded by their father Rowland Hazard in 1802. The brothers at first focused on relatively inexpensive wool and cotton products primarily marketed towards the Southern United States. After the mill burned down in 1844, the brothers established a new mill in 1847 which produced broadcloths and shawls; they formed the Peace Dale Manufacturing Company the following year. An additional shawl mill was completed in 1859, followed by a major expansion in 1872 which added a large mill dedicated to woolen products. The switch in focus towards wool products was motivated in part by a downturn in sales to the southern states, attributed to Rowland G. Hazard's strong abolitionist sympathies. Hazard was an active member of the antislavery Free Soil Party and its successor the Republican Party, and was instrumental in the freeing of a number of wrongly imprisoned free Black men during a visit to New Orleans in 1845.

While the original mill had used water power from the Saugatucket River, as the mill complex expanded steam power was introduced as well. The boilers required coal, imported to the coastal town of Narragansett Pier four miles (6.4 km) southeast by ships and then loaded on wagons and brought to the mills. Transloading coal into wagons and moving them overland was slow and costly. The lack of an efficient means of transport overland also hampered the mills' ability to import and export materials and finished wool products.

Narragansett Pier's potential as a coastal resort had been known to businessmen since the construction of its first hotel in 1856, but significant growth was held back by poor transportation links. The nearest rail line to the Pier was the New York, Providence and Boston Railroad (commonly known as the Stonington Line) which opened in 1837 with a station at West Kingston. From there, travelers had to take a bumpy nine-mile (14 km) stagecoach trip to the Pier. The only alternative was taking a ship across Narragansett Bay from Newport, a route infamous for its rough seas. Hazard had previously been a major investor in the construction of the Union Pacific Railroad and was therefore familiar with the benefits of rail transport. He recognized that both the mills and Narragansett Pier would greatly benefit from a railroad, and therefore set about organizing one with industrialist and politician William Sprague IV, receiving legislative approval for a charter in 1868.

=== Construction ===
While a survey was completed for the proposed railroad promptly after Hazard and Sprague obtained their charter, neither party had ever built a railroad before, and funding from other investors was not forthcoming. For several years, the organizers attempted to secure more funding with little success. Sprague's eponymous Sprague Company was devastated by the Panic of 1873, and with the financial downturn came even more difficulty in attracting investors. By the time the economy began to recover, the Hazards could count on only a handful of small industries in Wakefield and several hotels in Narragansett Pier as partners in their railroad venture. With the original charter set to expire in 1875 and no progress in construction made, Rowland G. Hazard reorganized the company that year at a meeting in Peace Dale; his son John N. Hazard was appointed company president. The primary issue to be settled was the route of the railroad, with two routes available that either bypassed or entered downtown Kingston. Kingston native Elisha R. Potter provided an additional $15,000 (equivalent to $427,000 in 2025) in funding to support the more expensive downtown Kingston routing, but when the stockholders held a subsequent meeting on January 26, 1876, to decide on a route, the option bypassing Kingston was the clear victor. The Stonington Line also agreed to subscribe $15,000 towards the line's construction in hopes that the opening of the new railroad would provide it with more business, making it the only major shareholder besides the Hazards. Funding from stock subscriptions totaled approximately $100,000 (equivalent to $3,023,000 in 2025 by this point, but expenses reached more than $186,000, requiring the company to obtain $96,000 (equivalent to $2,903,000 in 2025) in bonds to cover the difference. Construction of the railroad, subcontracted to Reynolds Dowling, was launched in February 1876.

After inquiries to several builders, a locomotive was ordered from the Mason Machine Works for $8,000 (equivalent to $242,000 in 2025) in early May and arrived the next month. Once it arrived, Rowland G. Hazard's demands for additional features on the locomotive and tender ("We do not find flag stands on the engine", Hazard complained) infuriated owner William Mason. Mason personally wrote an exasperated reply to Hazard, stating "I have never furnished Flag Staves. They are expensive and boyish .... You paid $800 less for an engine than I have ever sold before. You should not expect too much in the way of extra furnishing". For rolling stock, a passenger car and baggage car were ordered from the Osgood Bradley Car Company (lettered A and B respectively) in mid-May, along with six side dump cars to carry coal shipments and a handcar for maintenance of way use. The Hazards had left many details out of their order, requiring Osgood Bradley to write them for particulars on everything from lettering to windows and lighting. Osgood Bradley delivered the two passenger cars on June 29 only for the railroad to discover their air brake hoses were incompatible with the ones on the locomotive, requiring an adaptor to be ordered.

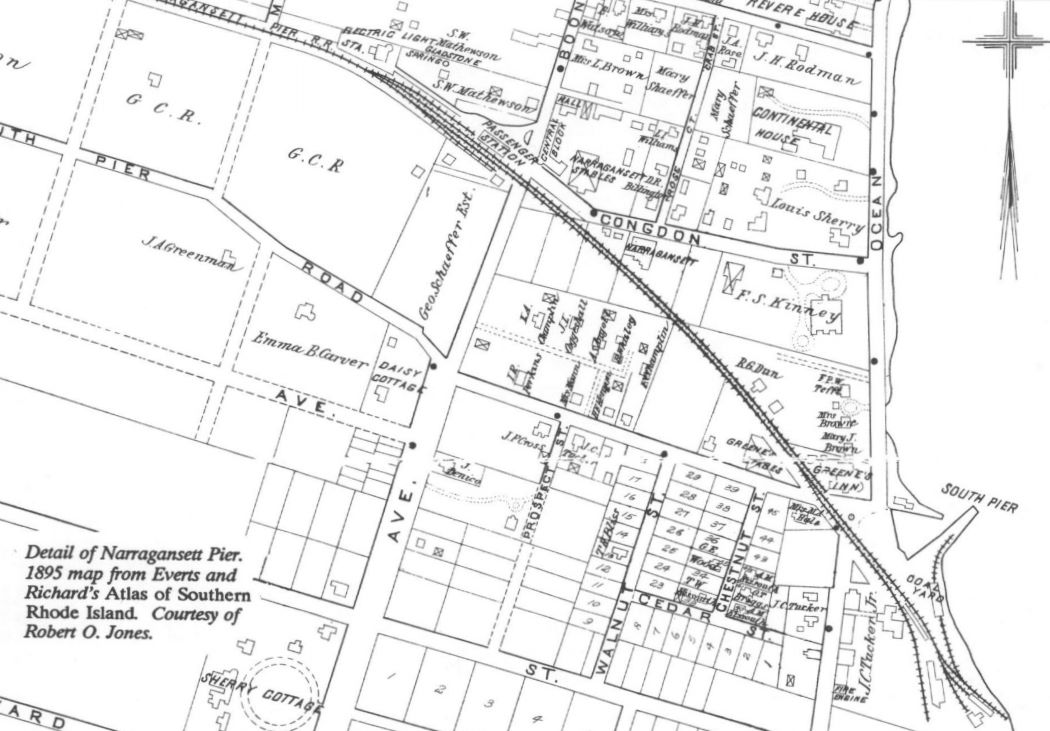
Detail of the track layout in Narragansett Pier, 1895. By this point the original station had been replaced with a new one on Boon Street.

The Hazards' ignorance of all the necessities for running a railroad day-to-day was the culprit for a wide variety of rushed orders for everything from spare sections of rail to baggage carts for use at stations (ordered within 48 hours of opening day); the line's railroad cars weren't ordered until halfway through May despite Hazard hoping to open the line on July 1. The company ran its first train on July 17, 1876. As built, the railroad began at a connection with the Stonington Line at Kingston station, where trains from both railroads called. The railroad diverged southeast up a hill, then proceeded east to Gould's Crossing, the first station. At Peace Dale, a trestle was built to carry the railroad on a southward curve over Kingston Avenue and two streams, beyond which the Peace Dale station was located along with a freight house and a small rail yard. The next station was at Wakefield, just after a bridge over the Saugatuck River. Beyond Wakefield, the railroad proceeded east, and after a pair of curves to the south and then the east, the final stop was at Narragansett Pier, where the original station was located by the water on Ocean Drive. The company's original engine house and a freight station were also located here, plus a short spur line to the South Pier itself. The completed line covered a distance of approximately 8.5 miles (13.7 km).

== Operation by the Hazard family ==
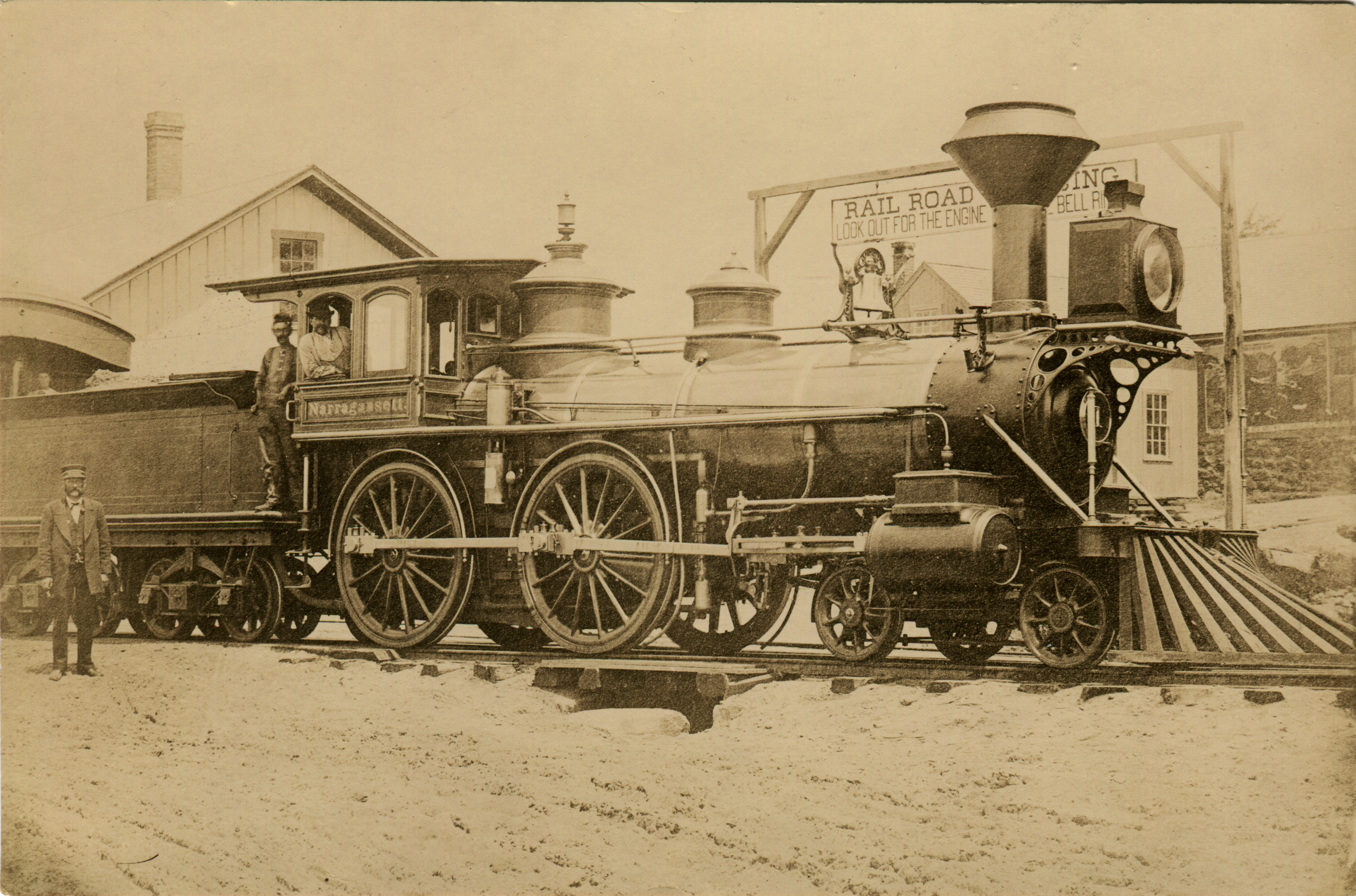
Locomotive 1, named Narragansett, was the company's first engine

Initially, four round trips were run daily for passengers, but growing patronage grew this to six and then nine (though service was reduced to five round trips in the winter off-season). Passenger trains connected with the Stonington Line at Kingston, and single tickets were available for travel on both railroads. Management attempted to reach similar agreements with other railroads in the region but found no takers. Passenger numbers were strong, with the railroad's sole passenger car filled to the brim on opening day. The freight business was secondary to passengers in importance, but significant amounts of coal were hauled from ships docking at Narragansett Pier to both the Peace Dale mills and local homes and businesses. Other traffic sources included wood and lumber, various agricultural products, and general freight; ice was imported in trains for local use as a coolant during the summers. Mail service on behalf of the United States Postal Service was started in 1878.

Many improvements quickly became necessary – passengers could find no benches at the railroad's stations until they were ordered late in the first month of operations, and a flatcar was quickly found indispensable and ordered from Osgood Bradley the following month. Even cords for the bells on the passenger cars needed replacement, and the Hazards sent a purchase order to Osgood Bradley asking for "the most desirable kind of rope". Western Union installed a telegraph line along the railroad in 1879.

By September, the Boston Evening Transcript reported the opening of the railroad to Narragansett Pier "has had a marked effect on this very popular seaside resort", including the demise of the stagecoach previously used by visitors from points west or south. The introduction of fast transportation to the resort town prompted a boom in construction of hotels and casinos. Travelers from Providence could reach Narragansett Pier in approximately 80 minutes' time.

Though the Narragansett had provided good service, as the sole locomotive it was used intensively and within a year was in need of an overhaul. With funds still short, company president John N. Hazard purchased a used locomotive from the Providence and Worcester Railroad with his own money and leased it to the railroad for the token price of $360 per year. As the company's second locomotive, it was accordingly numbered 2 and named Namcook.

Finances had improved enough by 1883 that the company was able to purchase a more powerful locomotive to replace the Namcook (which president Hazard reclaimed and sold). Ordered new from the Brooks Locomotive Works and comparable to the Narragansett, the new engine was numbered 3 and named Wakefield. Over the following years, a pair of combine cars, four more coal cars, and a boxcar were added to the company's roster, some new and others used.

=== Peak of prosperity ===
By 1890, passenger business had grown to more than 100,000 passengers per year; 20,000 short tons (18,000 long tons; 18,000 t) of freight were also carried that year. For the first time, the railroad began posting significant profits. Passenger trains covered the length of the line in around 25 minutes, including station stops on the way. Travelers from as far away as New York City and Philadelphia took the railroad to reach Narragansett Pier, making their trips over the Stonington Line to Kingston. The Stonington Line was leased by the New York, New Haven and Hartford Railroad in 1892, which became the Narragansett Pier Railroad's new connecting line. The railroad paid its first dividend to shareholders in 1893. Private passenger cars owned by wealthy visitors to the Pier became a regular sight along the railroad. Visitors could ride the dedicated Narragansett Pier Express from New York City to the Pier in approximately five hours; other through trains connected the Pier to Providence and to Stonington, Connecticut, (a port of call for steamships from New York City). Special passenger trains were also run as needed, for various social occasions or the Washington County Fair; polo horses also traveled in special freight trains. A special train carrying newspapers from New York City made the fastest ever traversal of the line by reaching the Pier 12 minutes after leaving Kingston.

The Narragansett Pier Railroad was compelled by complaints to reduce its passenger fares in 1901. Passengers also complained that the railroad required long layover times for travelers connecting with trains to and from Providence. The Manufacturers and Farmers Journal reported that the company's trains routinely departed more than a half an hour past their scheduled times. This was perceived especially poorly since the trip to Narragansett Pier was only a matter of minutes; the newspaper derided the railroad as "the South County monopoly". The monopoly allegation was also made in 1898 by proponents of a new steamboat wharf in Narragansett Pier that would connect to Providence. Steamboat boosters pointed to the railroad's high rates between Kingston and Narragansett Pier (50 cents, equivalent to $19 in 2025) and surcharges on coal shipments. The wharf was ultimately built by the Providence, Newport and Fall River Steamboat Company in 1898 despite strong opposition from the railroad and some residents; however, it only lasted until 1905.

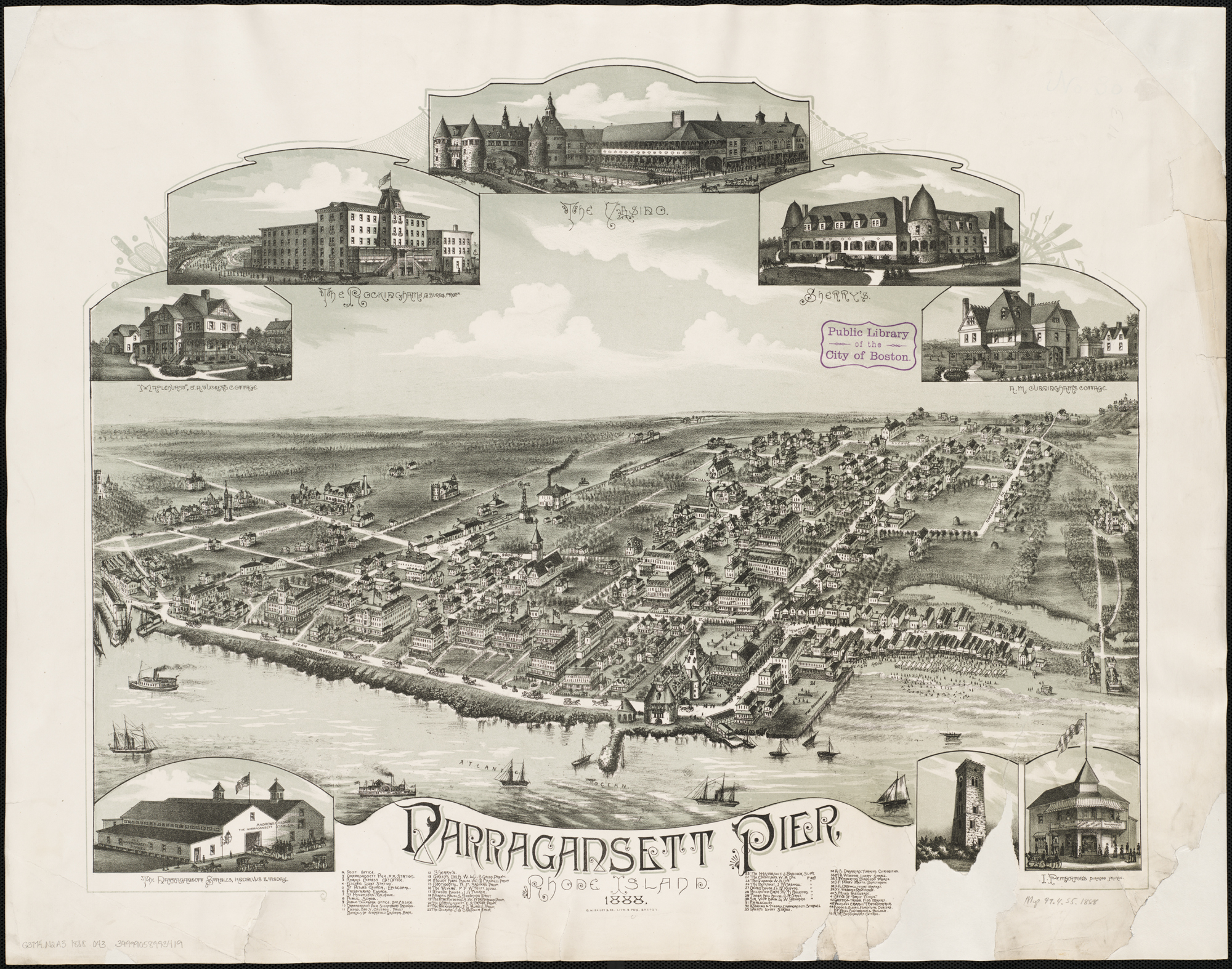
Depiction of Narragansett Pier in 1888 including the railroad

The railroad signed an agreement with the Sea View Railroad – an electric railroad opened between East Greenwich and Narragansett Pier in 1900 – to add overhead wire between Peace Dale and a connection with the Sea View in Narragansett Pier. The agreement also permitted the Sea View to run its trolleys on the line, which began in 1902. At the end of the 5-year agreement, the Narragansett Pier Railroad refused to renew it, wary of enabling its competitor. The Sea View Railroad responded by commencing construction of its own line to Peace Dale (and ultimately Westerly) but only made it to Robinson Street in Wakefield, where the Narragansett Pier Railroad refused to allow its tracks to cross theirs. The Sea View's station at Narragansett Pier was adjacent to the beach, while arrivals at the Narragansett Pier Railroad station further south needed to take a bus to reach it, which greatly bothered the Hazards.

=== Steamship operations ===
Railroad management was eager to find more sources of revenue and eyed the busy tourist destination of Newport, which was a destination for many ships from New York City. To convince some of these travelers to come to Narragansett Pier, the Hazards bought a steamboat, the Herman S. Caswell, in 1879, which began summer service across Narragansett Bay between the two destinations. A replacement, the Manisees, entered operation in 1897 and continued this service until 1900, when declining patronage prompted the Hazards to sell the ship to the U.S. government and end steamship services.

== Rhode Island Company control and temporary nationalization ==
Changes in the railroad's financial situation led the Hazard family to seek an exit from running the railroad by 1910. Revenues had been declining for several years, driven by a loss of passenger business to automobiles and fewer visitors to Narragansett Pier. The Pier itself never fully recovered from the burning of its casino in September 1900; a new, more modest casino failed to attract the patronage of its predecessor. The Hazard family found a buyer in the New Haven, which under the control of J. P. Morgan was fearful of the Southern New England Railway and its plans to build a competing rail line in the area. Were the Southern New England to buy the Narragansett Pier Railroad, it would have an outlet to Narragansett Bay. While the threat of this happening was rather remote, taking control of the Narragansett Pier was small change for Morgan. The Narragansett Pier Railroad was therefore leased by the New Haven-owned Rhode Island Company, also controlled by Morgan. With the Hazard family as the predominant shareholders, their approval of the lease overcame opposition from some smaller shareholders who distrusted the New Haven.

The Rhode Island Company was having issues turning a profit (in no small part due to excessive acquisitions via lease such as the Narragansett Pier Railroad) and in danger of entering bankruptcy. The integration of a steam railroad within the otherwise all-electric Rhode Island Company system posed challenges for the streetcar operator. The Narragansett Pier Railroad's new owners unintentionally neglected many of the required maintenance of way tasks needed to keep the line in a state of good repair. Matters deteriorated further when the railroad was nationalized by the United States Railroad Administration (USRA) as a wartime measure effective January 1, 1918. Though World War I was not fought on American soil, it hurt the railroad by making both workers and materials harder to come by. Only minimal increases in usage of the railroad could be attributed to the war. Within the USRA, the Narragansett Pier Railroad was grouped with the entire New Haven system and controlled from New Haven, Connecticut, far away from the small Rhode Island branch line which could not claim much importance in the war effort.

During USRA control, passenger service was gradually cut from eleven daily trips to six, while the railroad's three steam locomotives were overworked to the point they developed damage to their boilers and could no longer operate at full power. Some attention was paid to track work, with the USRA installing new rails and ties (thought the ties often not well-made). A second floor was also added to the station building in Wakefield.

Following the conclusion of World War I, the long-troubled Rhode Island Company finally failed on January 30, 1919. As part of the resolution of the Rhode Island Company's assets, the Narragansett Pier lease was cancelled in 1920; the USRA returned operations to the Hazard family on March 1, 1920.

== Second period of Hazard family operations ==
The president of the Narragansett Pier Railroad, Nathaniel T. Bacon, purchased the bonds of the Sea View Railroad (also previously controlled by the Rhode Island Company) in September 1920. At the behest of Bacon, the railroad experimented with a gas-electric railcar that could potentially run on both the Sea View and the Narragansett Pier. This proved to be a poor decision, as on top of the $15,000 (equivalent to $241,000 in 2025) purchase price the railroad ended up spending over $1,000 on necessary repairs before the railcar even arrived. The railcar's motor was started only after numerous attempts over many weeks by railroad employees. Trials ended poorly when the 70-foot-long (21 m) McKeen railcar broke its motor on a sharp curve at Sprague Park in Narragansett Pier; the railcar never operated again and was ultimately scrapped. Bacon sold the Sea View for scrap two months later when a financing plan with the towns along its route fell through. With the end of trolley service, the New Haven agreed to run a dedicated freight car between Providence and Kingston daily for traffic along the Narragansett Pier Railroad route.

The Rhode Island legislature passed a law in April 1920 allowing the towns of Narragansett and South Kingstown to directly subsidize the railroad as well as exempt it from local taxation, and also ordered the state's Public Utilities Commission to allow the railroad to reduce or eliminate unprofitable services. As authorized by the act, the town of Narragansett agreed in June 1920 to suspend the railroad's taxes for five years. Despite this, the railroad announced its intention to shut down entirely on March 20, 1921, citing competition by automobiles and trucks and a loss of $15,000 (equivalent to $271,000 in 2025). Subsequently, the towns of Narragansett and South Kingstown agreed to provide a combined total of $15,000 of aid for the railroad in May 1921, enough to cover the company's deficit from the previous year.

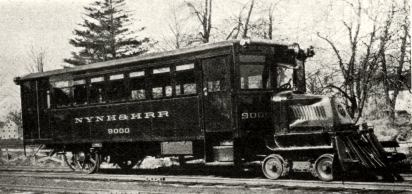
A railbus operated by the New Haven, very similar to the "Micky-Dinks"

The railroad acquired a Mack-Brill railbus in 1921 for use along its main line during non-peak times when passenger demand was insufficient for a locomotive-hauled train to be profitably operated. Placed into service on June 9, 1921, the railbus proved both reliable and highly economical, with a cost per train-mile less than one quarter that of a steam locomotive with two passenger cars. The enhanced service frequencies enabled by the gas-powered railbus resulted in an increase of over 10,000 passengers in one year, prompting the company to order a second one in 1922. Quickly, the railbuses acquired a nickname – "Micky-Dinks" – after the nicknames of two of their drivers.

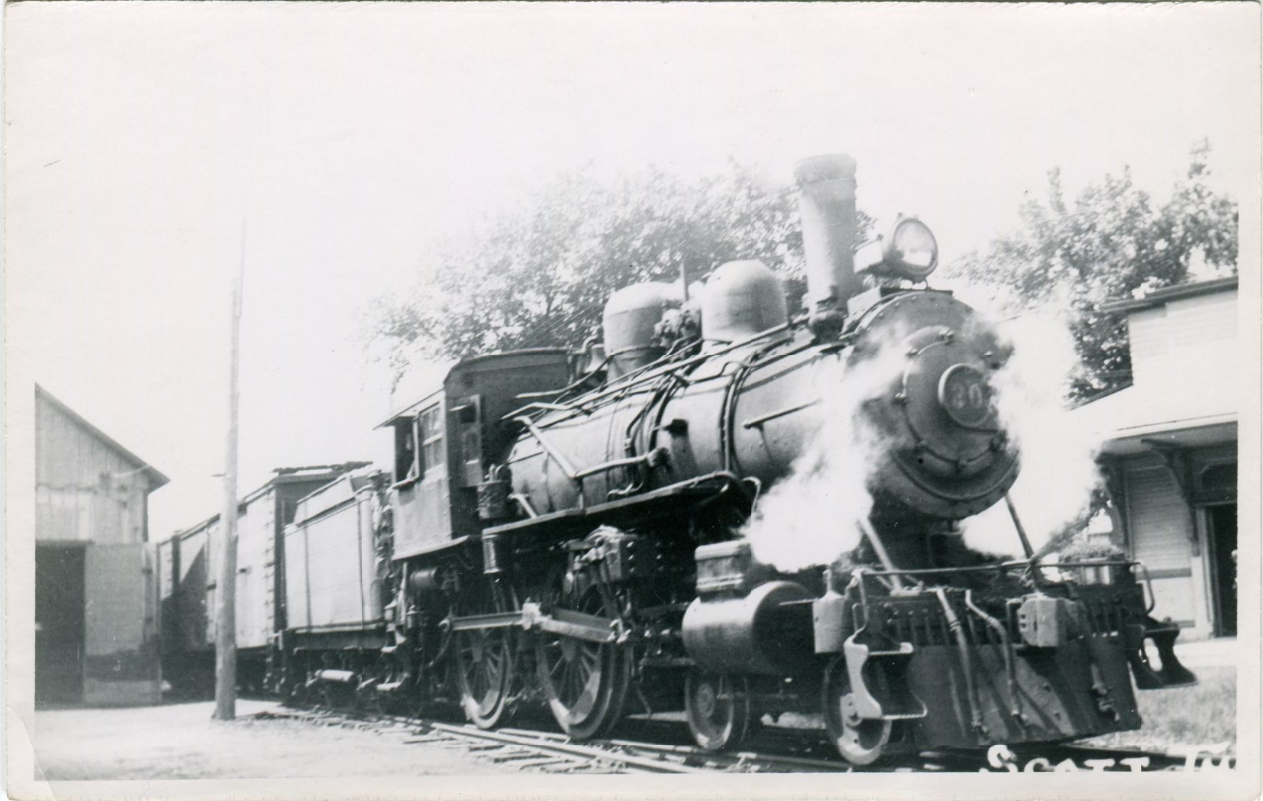
A train at Peace Dale station in 1936, shortly before the end of steam power on the railroad

Company management was not ignorant of the role of automobiles and buses in the loss of passenger business, and responded by launching their own bus service in 1925, connecting Narragansett Pier and Providence. In large part, this covered the route of the abandoned Sea View Railroad. Additional stops were added in response to demand, including in Wakefield and the ferry dock in Saunderstown, connecting to Newport. Proving profitable, a second bus line was launched from Kingston station to Narragansett Pier (essentially duplicating the railroad's main line, but also serving the University of Rhode Island which the railroad skipped) in 1927. Beyond buses, a road trucking subsidiary was also launched in 1930.

A new steam locomotive, a 2-6-0 'Mogul' numbered 11, was ordered from ALCO in 1922 and arrived on the railroad in 1923. The new arrival prompted management to retire the company's other steam locomotives, though any breakdowns meant a locomotive from the New Haven had to be rented as a substitute at a high cost. This finally grew unbearable by 1930, when the company purchased outright a used 4-4-0 "American" locomotive from the New Haven, numbered 20.

=== The Great Depression and World War II ===
Company finances were harmed by the Great Depression, which started in 1929. Revenues from both passenger and freight business decreased dramatically from 1928 onward: that year the company earned approximately $47,000 from freight and $13,000 from passengers, but by 1936 these numbers had dropped to $27,000 and $654 respectively. The Depression spelled the end of private passenger cars on the railroad, though this business had been in decline for a number of years. The formerly profitable bus service began operating at a loss from 1930 onward, despite attempts to attract more customers through advertising. In response, the Hazard family incorporated the South County Transportation Company as a wholly owned subsidiary, keeping the buses (and the highway freight business, which was somewhat more successful) one step removed from the railroad.

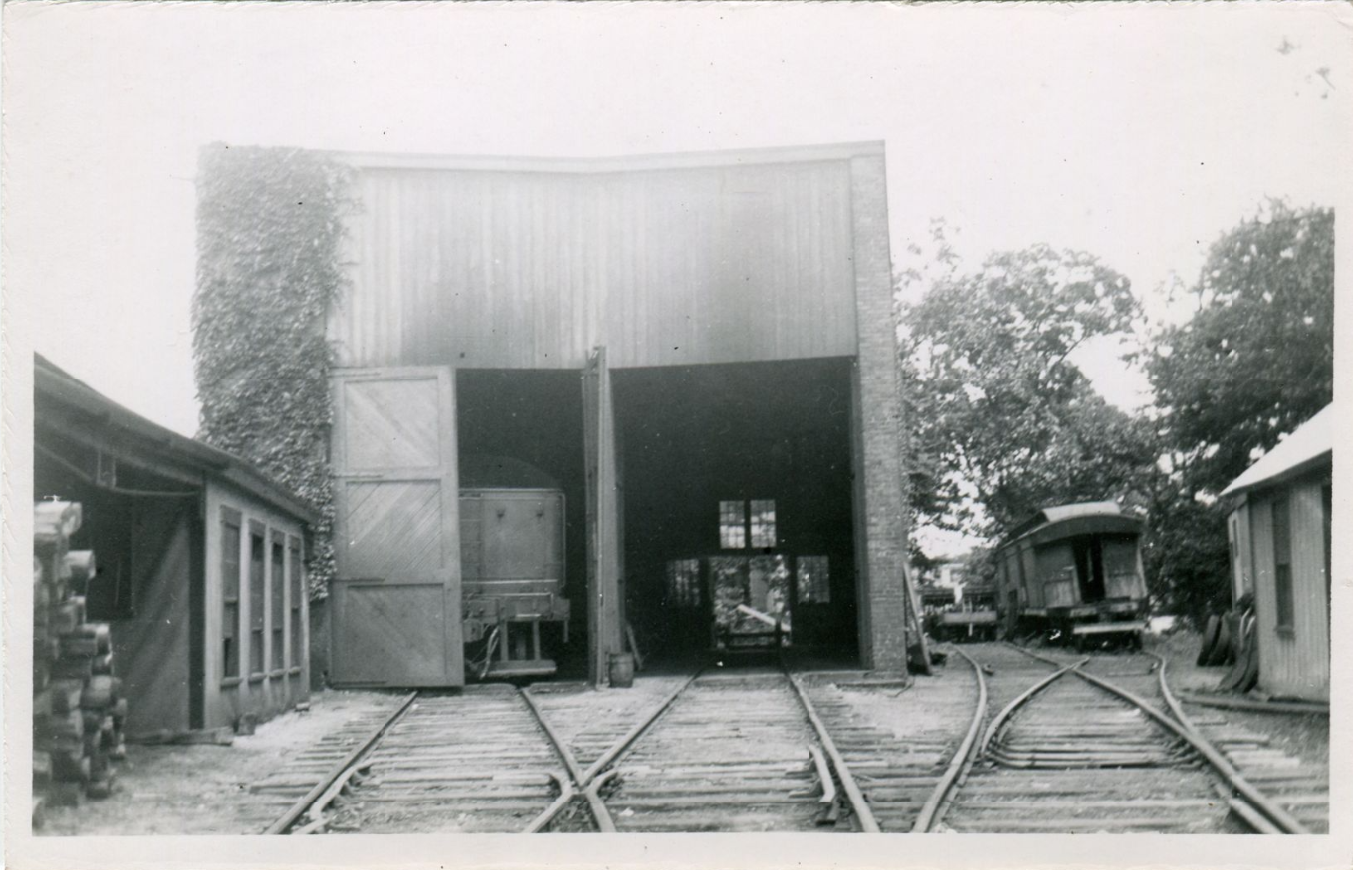
The railroad's two-stall roundhouse in 1936, located adjacent to Peace Dale station

The railroad entered receivership on February 1, 1936, along with its bus subsidiary the South County Transportation Company. T. G. Hazard, Jr, asked for receivership and stated the railroad could not pay its expenses. The railroad's superintendent assumed the position of receiver. Hazard stated that the railroad had continued running chiefly to provide its employees with jobs, and stated his hope that another company would purchase the railroad. The company exited receivership near the end of the year when the New Haven, one of the chief creditors, agreed to accept a note rather than a cash payment. However, the South County Transportation Company did not survive, shutting down in July 1936. A few buses were retained by the railroad to continue service between Kingston and Narragansett Pier, largely replacing the Micky-Dinks; this service survived until 1938 when the company ceased non-railroad activities entirely. The telegraph line was discontinued in 1939 along with the sale of the Wakefield station – which sat on valuable land in demand for commercial use – to the Wakefield Branch Company, a local lumber, coal, and oil supplier.

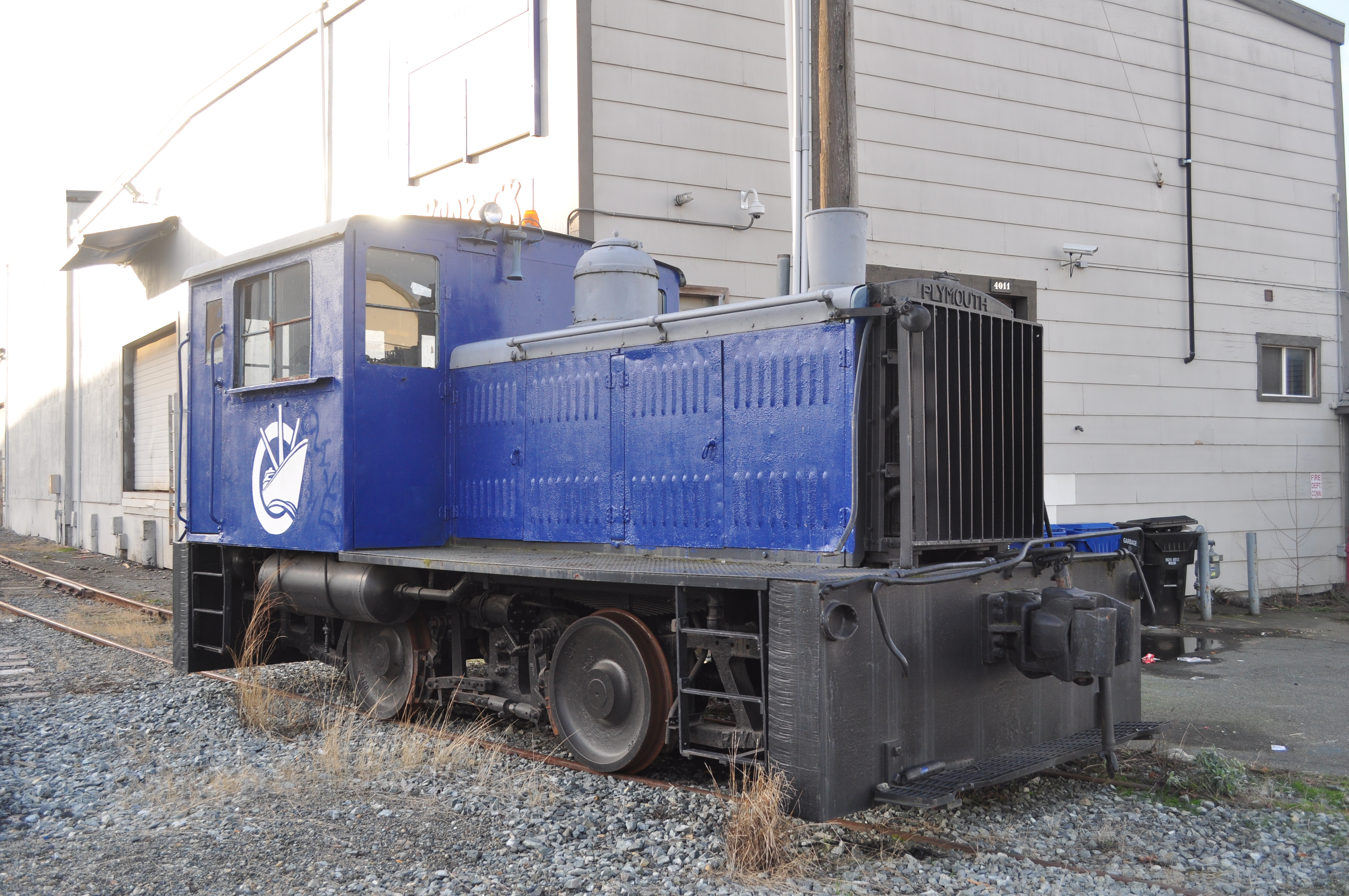
A Plymouth switcher similar to the one operated by the Narragansett Pier Railroad

The railroad adopted dieselization in 1937 by purchasing a Plymouth Locomotive Works switcher. To cut costs, all of the company's steam locomotives were removed from service at this time and the remaining passenger cars sold for scrap, since the railbuses made them largely redundant. Maintenance was deferred to reduce expenses, resulting in a deterioration of the right-of-way. A surge in traffic brought by World War II helped bring the railroad back from the brink, but following the war the same trends harming the railroad's business – namely the closure of local mills and increased use of automobiles – resumed.

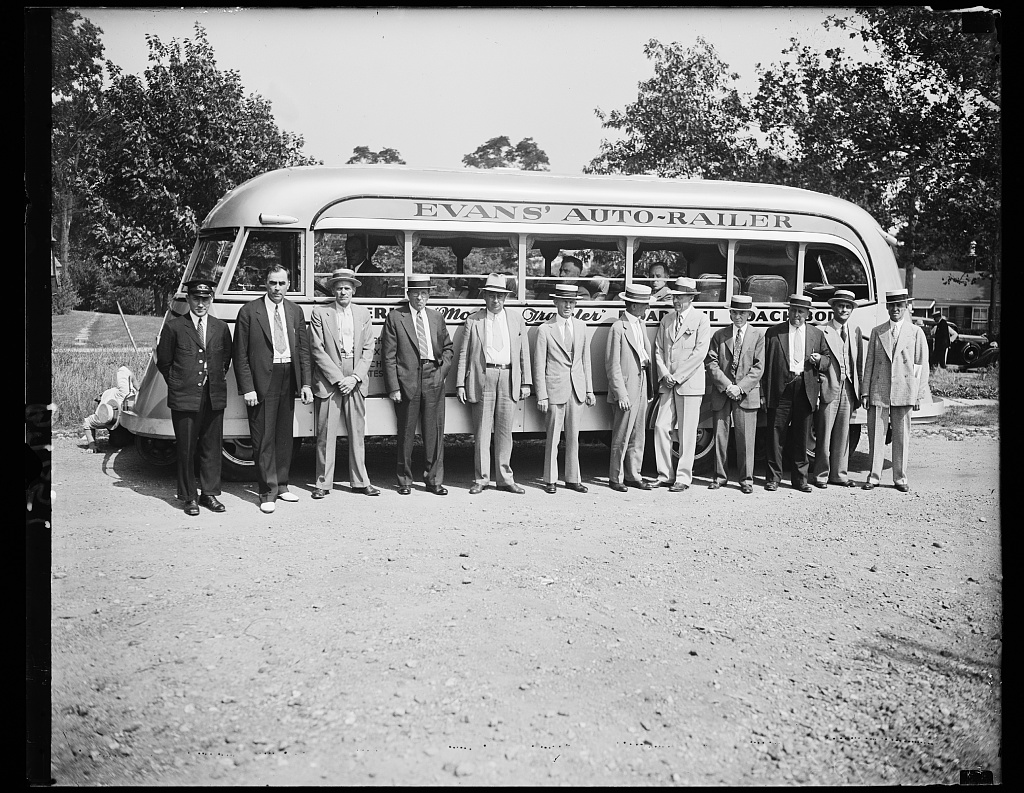
An Evans Auto-Railer similar to the one operated by the railroad

A road-rail bus capable of operating on both roadways and railroad tracks (officially known as the Evans Auto-Railer) was purchased from the Arcade and Attica Railroad in March 1941 following an overhaul by that railroad's maintenance workers. This was despite the railroad's experimental (and unsuccessful) trials with an eight-ton locomotive from Evans the previous year – the locomotive had the power to haul only a handful of cars at a time, and a trip to the Kingston rail yard inadvertently ended in disaster when "its wooden-spoked wheels fouled every switch in the nearby tower" run by the New Haven. The infuriated tower operator phoned Peace Dale and demanded the locomotive never again leave Narragansett Pier Railroad tracks, and the locomotive was subsequently returned to its builder.

== American Associates ownership ==
American Associates, the family trust of Royal Little, purchased the railroad from the Hazard family in April 1946 at a cost of $25,000 (equivalent to $413,000 in 2025). Little was also the founder and owner of Textron, then a textiles company. Little had both a home and an office in Narragansett, and following the purchase Textron announced plans to use the railroad's station in Narragansett Pier as a sewing plant. The railroad continued operating at a loss, leading to the American Associates asking for tax exemptions from South Kingstown and Narragansett in 1949. Voters in both towns approved exemptions for that year, but South Kingstown voters rejected an extension of the exemption in 1950. Though Narragansett voters approved another extension, most of the railroad's tax burden was paid to South Kingstown and so the railroad declared Narragansett's offer moot.

With no end to the losses in sight, American Associates declared its intention to terminate passenger service in May 1950, pointing to low ridership. It was rare that any Micky-Dink runs carried more than half a dozen passengers, and many trips carried as few as two people. Locals raised objections; residents of Narragansett were particularly upset at the prospect of losing their only remaining passenger rail service. Railroad management insisted they would apply for total abandonment of the line if they didn't get their way. Unsuccessful attempts were made to find funding for a subsidy to stop abandonment, while the cash-strapped railroad entered a state of disrepair. In 1952, the Wakefield Branch Company, a major rail customer along the line, announced it was willing to purchase the railroad so long as passenger service was discontinued. Now worried about losing the railroad entirely, South Kingstown and Narragansett dropped their objections.

The company's last operating Mickey-Dink broke one of its axles in June 1952 and was not repaired. Remaining passengers were carried in taxis or the company superintendent's automobile until formal approval for ending passenger service came from the state Public Utilities Commission at the end of the year.

== Later owners ==
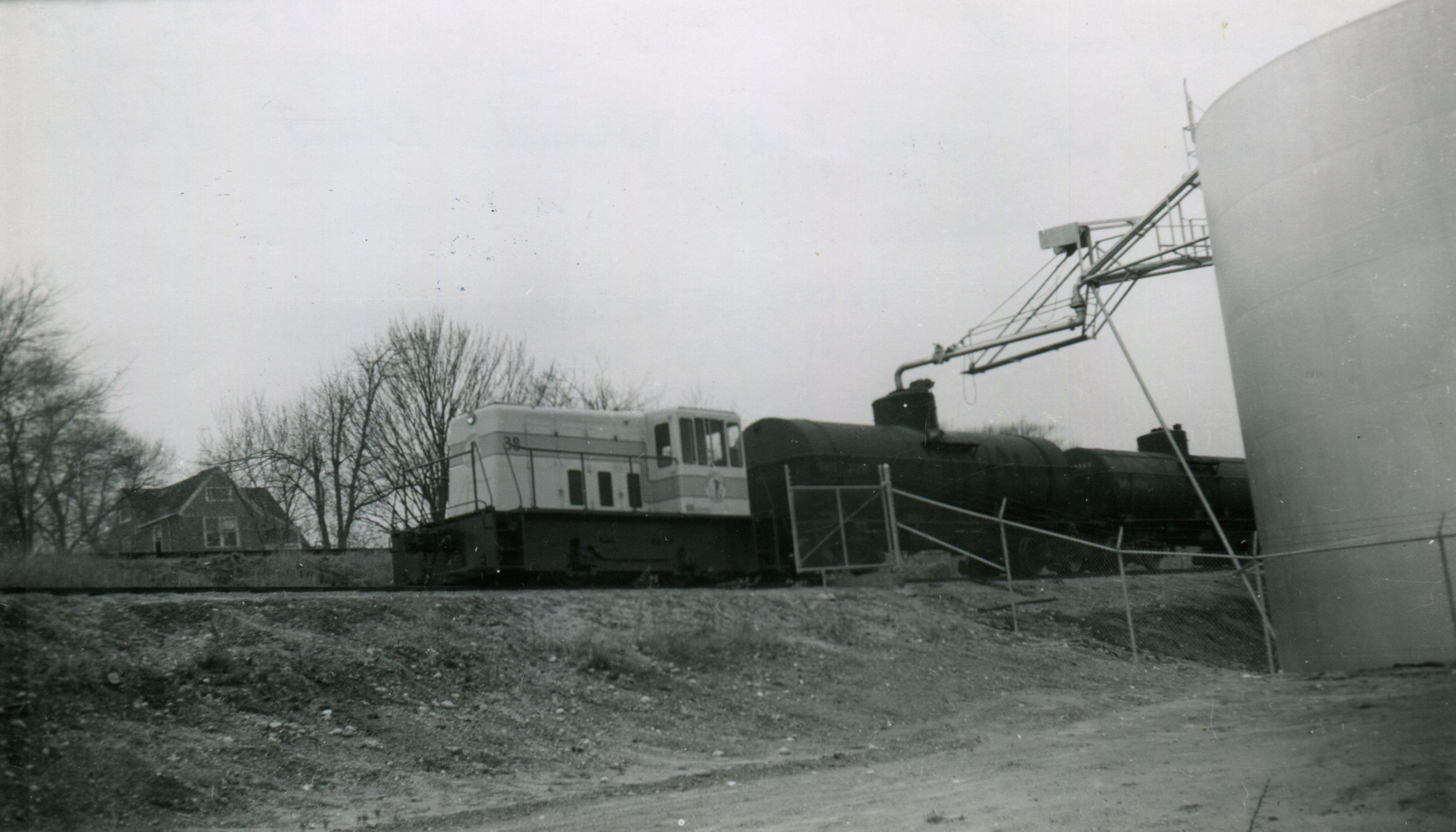
Narragansett Pier Railroad 38 in 1959

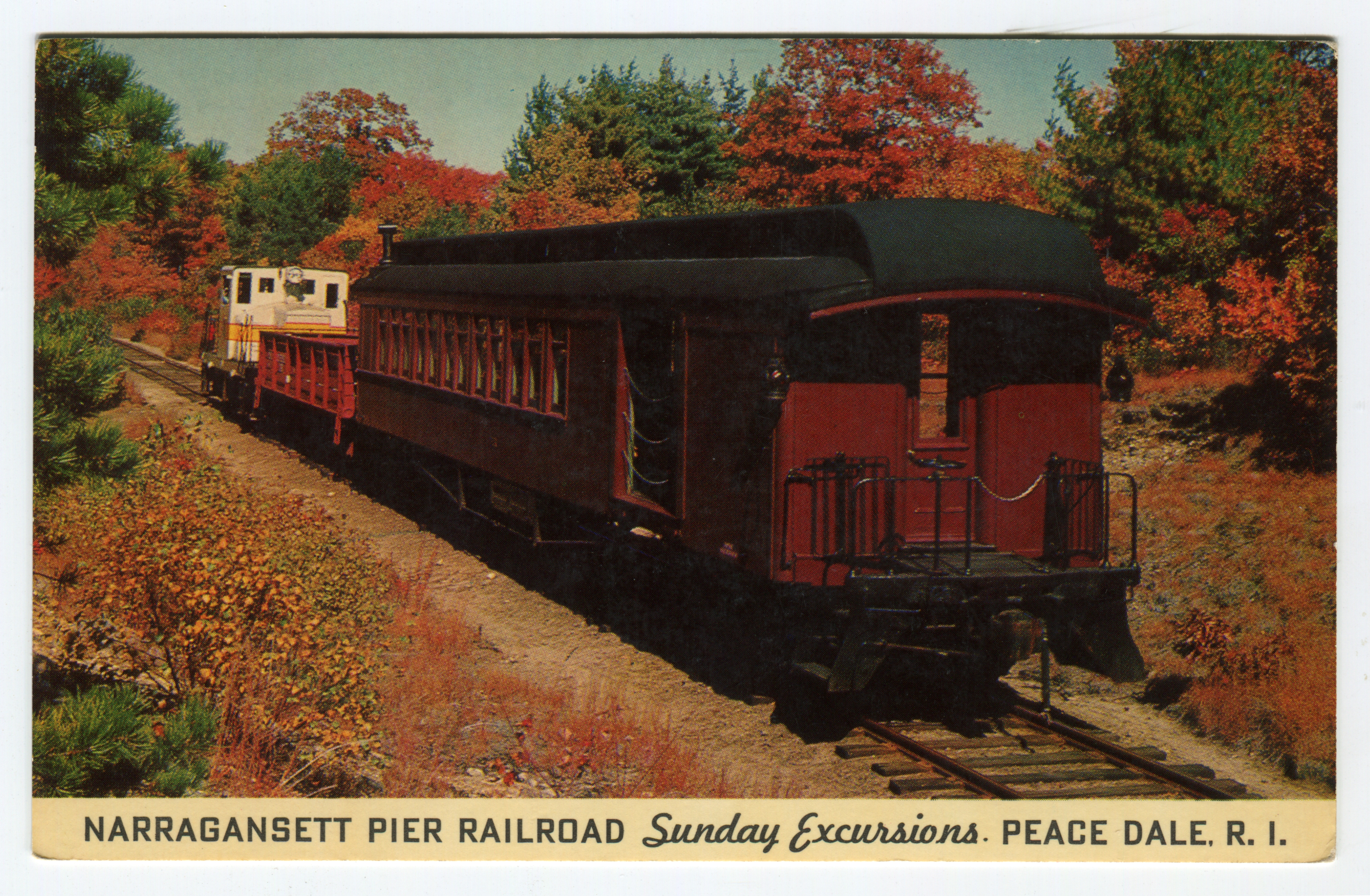
Narragansett Pier Railroad 40 with a passenger excursion in 1965

Once passenger service was ended, the Wakefield Branch Company kept its promise and purchased the railroad for $12,000 (equivalent to $144,000 in 2025) on April 1, 1953. The railroad's new owner inherited a company in financial trouble and purchased the line to save it. With passenger service gone, the line did little business in Narragansett Pier, averaging three freight cars inbound a year. Excluding one time shipments related to decommissioning of a local military base, outbound traffic was also minimal. At the behest of the State of Rhode Island, which was building a highway crossing the railroad right-of-way near Narragansett Pier, the railroad applied to abandon the now seldom-used 2.25-mile (3.62 km) segment beyond Wakefield in June 1953. The town of Narragansett dropped its objection to the proposed abandonment after the railroad offered to donate two acres (0.81 ha) of land for use as a park. As no further objections were received, the state of Rhode Island declined to intervene and the Interstate Commerce Commission gave the railroad permission to abandon the segment. The new terminus was in Wakefield, reducing the line to approximately six miles (9.7 km) in length. Unfortunately for the state, by this point work on the bridge had progressed to the point it was cheaper to complete it than to abandon its construction.

The largest single customer was a fish-processing facility located in South Kingstown which imported salt and exported liquefied fish in tank cars for use in animal feed. Under Wakefield Branch Company ownership, the railroad directed some attention to improving its physical plant, including purchasing a new diesel locomotive in 1958. The railroad's new owner successfully returned it to profitability, handling significant shipments both for itself and the fish plant. The Wakefield Branch Company wanted to keep rail service but was not very interested in running an entire railroad, and therefore was happy to sell. Another change of ownership took place in 1964, with J. Anthony Hanold, a systems analyst from Philadelphia, becoming the line's new owner. Hanold brought back passenger service in the form of excursion trains run on weekends and holidays. Regular excursions included a 1928 flatcar converted into a gondola and a former Boston and Maine Railroad (B&M) combination baggage and passenger car built in 1905. A second passenger car from the B&M was also obtained in the hopes of its restoration, and the railroad acquired an observation car from New Brunswick for use on charters. Additionally, the railroad converted the Peace Dale station, which had been built in 1876, into a museum with a variety of railroad-related exhibits and opened the company's roundhouse and a freight station to visitors. Unfortunately for the company, the excursions were not successful at salvaging the company's finances. Since the railroad no longer reached Narragansett Pier, there were no major attractions for tourists on the line, and cost-cutting meant that the vegetation along the line had become overgrown, making sightseeing near impossible.

During the 1970s, freight traffic consisted of fertilizer, lumber and building products. In 1971, the line changed hands again when a duo of Illinois industrialists, Grant Veitsch and Theodore Leviton, took over from several businessmen from New Haven, Connecticut. The pair announced plans to establish a facility to train new locomotive engineers. The new owners once again revived excursion trains, in hopes of offsetting declining freight business; local schools also expressed interest in sending students to school via train instead of bus. Complaints from local residents about the smell forced the fish plant to truck fish to Maine for processing, and the railroad was unable to get Penn Central to cooperate in shipping salt to a railroad-owned distribution facility in Wakefield.

By 1977, the railroad was owned by John Miller, a dentist who lived in Newtown, Connecticut, and planned to turn the railroad into a museum. Miller announced his intention to reacquire locomotive 11, previously sold by the Narragansett Pier Railroad in 1937, from a New York railroad museum for passenger excursions. At this point, trains ran only once or twice per week for freight service, and the railroad was losing money, though this was mitigated by fellow railfans doing much of the railroad's labor on a volunteer basis. Number 11 was shipped to the railroad and restoration started, but ultimately was not completed. Miller decided to sell the line at the end of 1979, stating that while he had enjoyed running the railroad, it was too far of a drive from his western Connecticut home and that all remaining freight customers had ended their rail service. He sought a buyer for $100,000 (equivalent to $444,000 in 2025), the price he had paid to buy the line, and would otherwise sell the company's real estate for development and scrap its remaining equipment. Miller found a potential buyer in California group B-J-T Industries, which expressed interest in buying the line and resuming both freight and passenger business, and announced it was negotiating with Miller in May 1980.

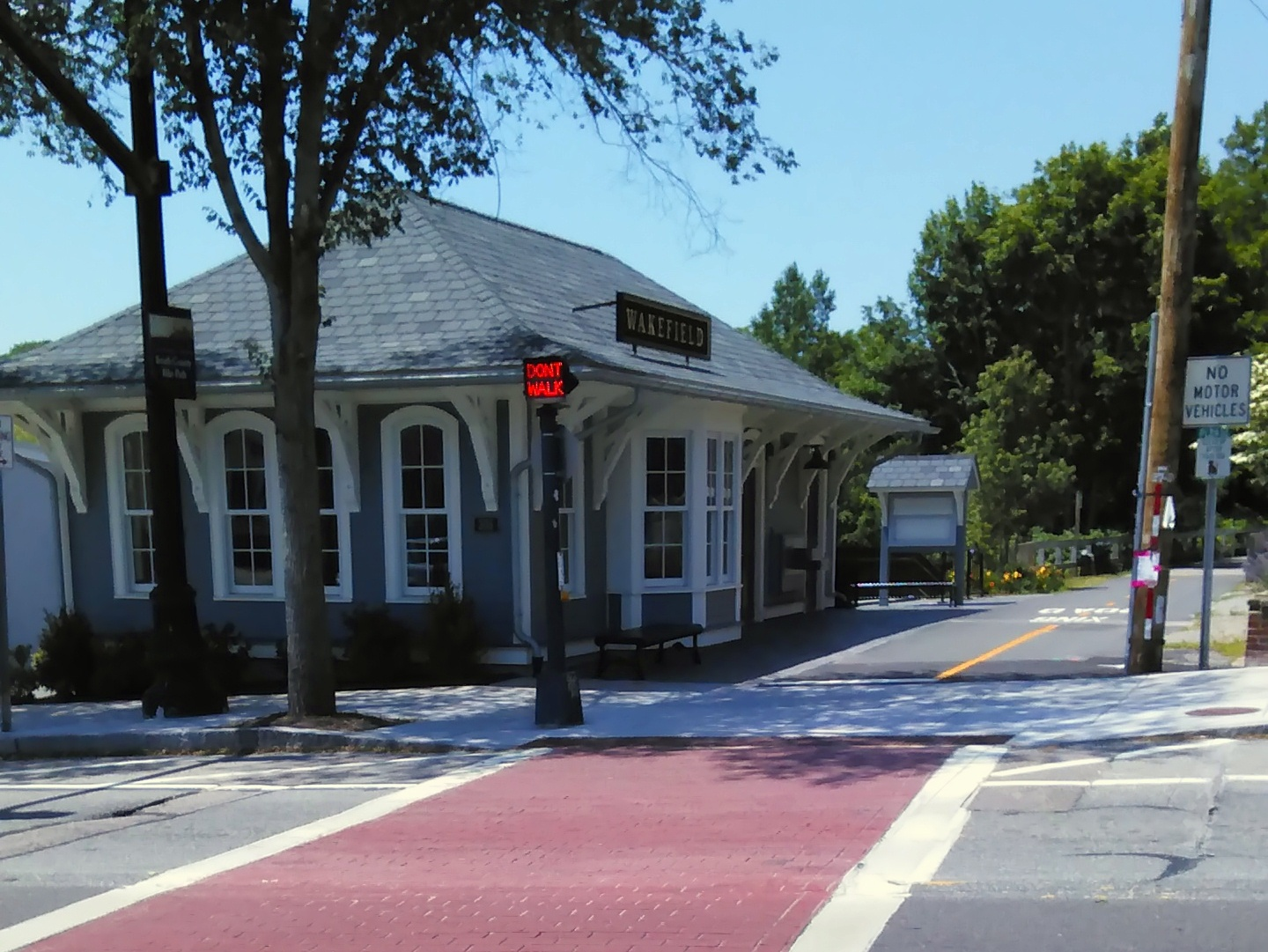
Replica of Wakefield station seen along the William C. O'Neill Bike Path

The railroad's final owner was Anthony Guarriello, who purchased it solely to remove its trestles through Peace Dale that he considered an impediment to traffic. The entire remaining line was abandoned in 1981, though several pieces of its equipment were saved, including a caboose transferred to the Valley Railroad in Connecticut, and a diesel locomotive that ended up in Micaville, North Carolina. Narragansett Pier Railroad 11 was also saved at the time of abandonment, and after spending a number of years at the Middletown and New Jersey Railroad, it was obtained by the Everett Railroad in Pennsylvania in 2005. After intensive repairs by the Western Maryland Scenic Railroad shops, the Everett Railroad completed restoration of the locomotive to operating condition in 2015 as Everett Railroad 11.

=== Legacy ===
Most of the former right-of-way was converted into the William C. O'Neill Bike Path (formerly known as the South County Bike Path), which initially opened in 2000 and in 2010 was extended to a mile outside Narragansett Pier. The railroad's two-stall roundhouse in Peace Dale remained standing as of 2007. The Peace Dale and Narragansett Pier train stations were also preserved as of 2017. A replica train station was constructed in Wakefield along the bike path in 2015.

== Rolling stock ==
Locomotives
Number	Name	Type	Manufacturer	Year acquired	Year retired	Comments
1	Narragansett	4-4-0	Mason Locomotive Works	1876	1891	
2	Namcook	4-4-0	Rhode Island Locomotive Works	1877	1883	
3	Wakefield	4-4-0	Brooks Locomotive Works	1883	1889	
4	Narragansett	4-4-0	Rhode Island Locomotive Works	1891	1926	
5	Wakefield	4-6-0	Rhode Island Locomotive Works	1894	1917	
6		4-4-0	Rhode Island Locomotive Works	1910	1924	
7		4-4-0	Manchester Locomotive Works	1914	1920	
11		2-6-0	American Locomotive Company	1923	1937	Preserved and operable at the Everett Railroad
20		4-4-0	New Haven Railroad Roxbury Shops	1930	1937	
30		Gasoline	Plymouth Locomotive Works	1937	1963	
31		Gasoline	Evans Products Company	1940	1941	
33		Gasoline	Plymouth Locomotive Works	1942	1959	
35		Gasoline	Plymouth Locomotive Works	1967	Unknown	
38		Diesel-electric (GE 35-ton)	GE Transportation	1958	1967	
40		Diesel-electric (GE 65-ton)	GE Transportation	1963	Unknown	

Railcars and railbuses
Number	Type	Manufacturer	Year acquired	Year retired	Comments
8	70' gas-electric railcar	McKeen Motor Car Company	1920	1920	
9	Railbus	Mack Trucks / J. G. Brill Company	1921	1940	
10	Railbus	Mack Trucks / American Car and Foundry Company	1922	1940	
32	Railbus	Evans Products Company	1940	1945	
34	Railbus	Evans Products Company	1942	1953	
36	Railbus	International Harvester	1949	1953	

== Station listing ==
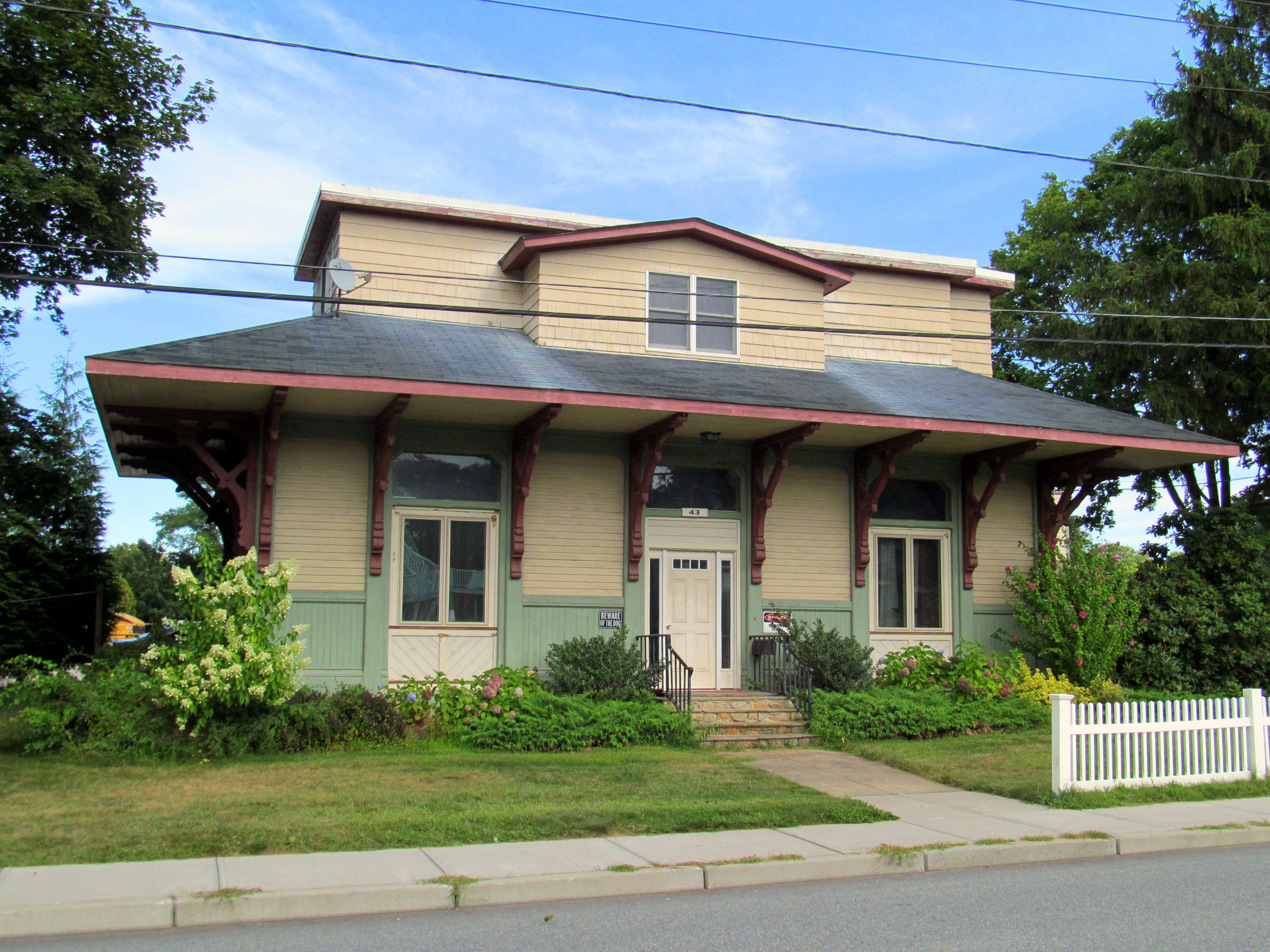
The former Peace Dale station, now privately owned

Station	Miles (km)	Comments
Kingston	0 (0)	Preserved station
Goulds	3 (4.8)	
Peace Dale	4 (6.4)	Preserved station
Rodman Crossing-Wakefield	5 (8)	Replica station
Sprague Park	6 (10)	
Narragansett Pier	8 (13)	Preserved station

== See also ==
- Moshassuck Valley Railroad
- Newport and Wickford Railroad and Steamboat Company
- Warwick Railway
- Wood River Branch Railroad
