= Seaview Railroad =

The following companies are or have been known as the Seaview Railroad or Sea View Railroad:

- Sea View Railroad (Brooklyn), the owner of the Brighton Beach Line and Coney Island Elevated in New York City
- Sea View Railroad (Rhode Island), an interurban from Providence south to Wakefield
- Seaview Transportation Company, commonly known as the Seaview Railroad, a terminal railroad in Rhode Island
