= Huntingdon and Broad Top 38 =

Preserved American 2-8-0 steam locomotive

Huntingdon and Broad Top Mountain Railroad 38
Type and origin
- Power type: Steam
- Builder: Baldwin Locomotive Works
- Serial number: 59946
- Build date: April 1927
Specifications
- Configuration
  - Whyte: 2-8-0
  - UIC: 1'D
- Gauge: 4 ft 8 1/2 in (1,435 mm) standard gauge
- Driver dia.: 51 in (1,300 mm)
- Wheelbase: 55 ft (17 m)
  - Engine: 23.33 ft (7.11 m)
  - Drivers: 15.25 ft (4.65 m)
- Adhesive weight: 140,000 lb (64,000 kg)
- Loco weight: 157,000 lb (71,000 kg)
- Tender weight: 125,000 lb (57,000 kg)
- Total weight: 282,000 lb (128,000 kg)
- Fuel type: Coal
- Fuel capacity: 10 long tons (10 t); 13.8 long tons (14.0 t); 12.5 long tons (12.7 t)
- Water cap.: 6,000 US gal (23,000 L; 5,000 imp gal); 5,800 US gal (22,000 L; 4,800 imp gal); 7,000 US gal (26,000 L; 5,800 imp gal)
- Firebox
  - Grate area: 35.10 sq ft (3.261 m^{2})
- Boiler pressure: 190 psi (1,300 kPa)
- Heating surface
  - Firebox: 129 sq ft (12.0 m^{2})
- Cylinders: Two, outside
- Cylinder size: 21 in × 26 in (530 mm × 660 mm)
- Valve gear: Walschaerts
- Valve type: Piston valves
- Loco brake: Air
- Train brakes: Air
- Couplers: Knuckle
Performance figures
- Tractive effort: 36,309 lb (16,469 kg)
- Factor of adh.: 3.86
Career
- Operators: Huntingdon and Broad Top Mountain Railroad and Coal Company; Rail City Museum; Livonia, Avon and Lakeville Railroad; Gettysburg Railroad; Knox and Kane Railroad
- Class: 37
- Number in class: 2nd of 2
- Numbers: H&BT 38; LA&L 38; GRR 38; K&K 38
- Retired: June 1954 (revenue service); 1976 (1st excursion service); 1989 (2nd excursion service)
- Restored: 1972 (1st excursion service); 1977 (2nd excursion service)
- Current owner: Everett Railroad
- Disposition: Undergoing restoration to operating condition

Huntingdon and Broad Top Mountain Railroad and Coal Co. 38 is a preserved 37 class 2-8-0 "Consolidation" type steam locomotive. It was built by the Baldwin Locomotive Works (BLW) in April 1927 for use on the Huntingdon and Broad Top Mountain Railroad and Coal Company (H&BT) in south central Pennsylvania in the United States, which commonly used the locomotive to pull short-distance freight trains, as well as occasional passenger trains, until the railroad shut down operations in 1954. The locomotive was subsequently acquired by the Rail City Historical Museum in Sandy Creek, New York, for static display. In the late 1960s, No. 38 was sold to the Livonia, Avon and Lakeville Railroad (LAL) in Lakeville, New York, who restored the locomotive to operating condition to pull their excursion trains.

In 1977, the locomotive was sold again to the Gettysburg Railroad (GETY), which used the locomotive to pull their own tourist trains until 1986, when No. 38 was transferred to the Knox and Kane Railroad (KKRR) to be used there. The locomotive had been removed from service in 1989 for a long-term overhaul that was eventually completed, but it never returned to service for the Knox and Kane. After No. 38 fell victim to an arson-related roundhouse fire in 2008, it was sold at an auction to Alan Maples for the Everett Railroad (EV). As of 2026, the Everett Railroad is restoring No. 38 to operating condition for use in excursion service alongside 2-6-0 No. 11.

== History ==
=== Design ===
No. 38 was constructed by the Baldwin Locomotive Works (BLW) of Philadelphia, Pennsylvania, in April 1927 as part of the Huntingdon and Broad Top Mountain Railroad and Coal Company's (H&BT) final class of steam locomotives ordered new, of which only two were built. The locomotive was designed very similarly to the H&BT locomotives Numbers 28 and 29. Although they had many different variations in valve gears, domes, and wheel configurations, they were all built with essentially the same cab, pilot trucks, and driving wheels (except for No. 30s and 35/36 with 66-inch-diameter driving wheels).

=== Revenue service ===
Upon arrival of the H&BT, No. 38 was assigned to pull coal trains from the coal fields of Broad Top, as well as mixed freight trains between various small towns, including Saxton (where the railroad’s roundhouse was located), Riddlesburg, Hopewell, Bedford, and Huntingdon, and some of the towns saw the H&BT interchange with the Pennsylvania Railroad (PRR). The locomotive would also be used to pull occasional passenger trains, taking local residents between towns, and coal miners between their homes and the Broad Top coal fields. Although, No. 38 would often remain in storage whenever there would be no train for it to pull.

Soon after the locomotive's construction date, the H&BT began running into some financial trouble for various reasons, including most of the PRR's lucrative traffic being redirected away from the H&BT, an increase of nearby competing short line railroads, and the Great Depression damaging the H&BT's finances, as well as causing some of the H&BT's customers to file for bankruptcy. When World War II broke out, the H&BT's coal traffic increased, and the railroad would haul some military equipment and soldiers that would help serve the war, but once the war was over, the H&BT's financial problems returned. The decline of the Broad Top coal fields, the crash of coal prices to continue mining, and most of the H&BT's remaining customers turning to shipping freight by truck would lead to the H&BT filing for bankruptcy. No. 38 went through a mostly uneventful career with the H&BT before it pulled the H&BT's final passenger train in November 1953, and it was subsequently put into storage on a sideline. The H&BT permanently closed all operations on March 31, 1954. The Everett Railroad, which was incorporated to operate over a portion of the former H&BT trackage, had considered adding No. 38 to their locomotive roster, but they ended up settling on purchasing an efficient diesel locomotive instead.

=== Early preservation ===
Soon after the H&BT shut down, scrapping commenced on the railroad's locomotives, rolling stock, and most of the trackage. On April 10, 1954, Stanley A. Groman visited the abandoned H&BT in Huntingdon while searching for railroad equipment to acquire and preserve. No. 38 was sitting in a sideline, awaiting to be scrapped, until it was acquired by Dr. Groman along with a passenger car, a railway post office car, a caboose, and various tools. Had it not been for Groman's negotiations, No. 38 would’ve been scrapped, and there would have been no H&BT equipment to be preserved. Shortly afterward, No. 38 began moving to Groman's newly constructed Rail City Historical Museum in Sandy Creek, New York, under its own power with the remaining H&BT rolling stock coupled behind it.

En route to Sandy Creek, Groman obtained permission from the New York Central Railroad (NYC) to use No. 38 to pull two passenger excursion trains on their mainline trackage. The first excursion train took place on May 29, 1954, and it was the final steam-powered train to run on the NYC's "Old Auburn" line from Canandaigua to Syracuse. Although, the arrival in Syracuse was delayed for three hours, as a result of the associated fanfare. The second excursion train that took place the following week, on June 6, made railroad history as the last steam-powered train to depart the Syracuse station, as well as being the last steam-powered train on the NYC's Watertown line from Syracuse to Lacona. It was also the overall last steam-powered passenger train to operate on the NYC, since all of the NYC's own remaining active steam locomotives of that time subsequently spent the rest of their revenue careers pulling freight and mail trains, exclusively.

The Rail City Museum became the first steam-operating railroad museum in the United States, and Groman had initially planned to use No. 38 to pull the museum's tourist trains. However, upon arrival in Sandy Creek, the locomotive's driving wheelbase, which has a length of 15.25 feet, was found to be too long to negotiate with the 1.5-mile loop track. The museum subsequently acquired 2-6-0 "Mogul" type No. 11 (a locomotive with a shorter wheelbase) from the Bath and Hammondsport Railroad (B&H) for use to pull their tourist trains, instead. No. 38 consequently spent the next fourteen years on static display next to the museum's water tower. In 1968, No. 38 was acquired by the Livonia, Avon and Lakeville Railroad (LA&L) with the intention to replace the railroad's previous steam locomotive, Ex–Buffalo Creek and Gauley 2-8-2 No. 17, in pulling their own excursion trains. The locomotive was subsequently moved to the Erie Lackawanna Railway's locomotive facility in Hornell, New York, where crews gave No. 38 a rebuild. During the process, the locomotive's original H&BT tender was discovered to be in poor condition with several leaks, so it was scrapped and replaced with a slightly larger tender from a PRR E7 class 4-4-2 "Atlantic" locomotive that carried more coal and less water. After the rebuilding process was completed in 1972, No. 38 began pulling excursion trains between Lakeville and Livonia, New York, on the LA&L's mainline. Four years later, No. 38 began experiencing boiler problems, and it was taken out of service to be repaired. By that time, however, LA&L began seeing more profitability in revenue freight service than that in excursion service, so No. 38 was placed into dead storage in Rochester, instead of receiving the necessary boiler repairs.

=== Sloan Cornell ownership ===
In 1977, the LA&L sold No. 38 along with their remaining passenger car fleet to Sloan Cornell. Cornell moved his new equipment to his recently established Gettysburg Railroad in Pennsylvania, where No. 38's boiler problems were solved after a brief overhaul took place. The locomotive subsequently began pulling tourist trains over the former Reading Company branchline between Gettysburg, Mount Holly Springs, and Biglerville. The Gettysburg Railroad also operated other steam locomotives; Ex–Mississippian Railway 2-8-0 No. 76, and a few years later, Ex–Canadian National 2-8-2 No. 3254. In 1985, Numbers 38 and 3254 participated in that year's National Railway Historical Society (NRHS) convention, which was being held at the Gettysburg Railroad, as well as the Strasburg Rail Road. The following year, 1986, Cornell moved No. 38 to the Allegheny National Forest, where he operated the shortline Knox and Kane Railroad (KKRR), and he planned to initiate tourist operations there. Prior to its arrival on the KKRR, No. 38's E7 tender tank was scrapped and replaced with a newly constructed tender tank that came with the same specifications as a PRR E6 class 4-4-2. On August 7, 1987, No. 38 pulled the KKRR's five-car inaugural train over former Baltimore and Ohio trackage from Marienville to Kane, as well as over former Erie trackage to cross the K&K's primary attraction, the Kinzua Bridge, and it was the first train to cross it in nearly twenty-eight years. The locomotive subsequently pulled additional tourist trains along the same route.

In 1989, though, No. 38 was removed from service once more, since it was due for another overhaul, but shortly afterwards, Cornell imported Chinese-built SY 2-8-2 locomotive SY-1658M (renumbered 58 on the KKRR), which was found to be more powerful and efficient for the railroad's needs. Throughout the 1990s, No. 38 was overhauled and inspected inside the KKRR's roundhouse in Marienville, and once work was completed, No. 38 remained in storage, never to pull a train for the KKRR again. In 2003, the Kinzua Bridge had collapsed from a Tornado storm, losing the K&K its major tourist attraction. With this factor, as well as the decline in the K&K's revenue shortline freight runs, Cornell decided to cease all operations on the K&K in the spring of 2006. Shortly afterwards, Numbers 38 and 58 were moved to the KKRR's enginehouse in Kane for further storage. On the morning of March 16, 2008, an arson fire burned down the K&K's Kane engine shed with No. 38 still inside. The locomotive's boiler jacketing was badly burned, and the headlight, the reproduction builder's plates, the reproduction front number plate, and some of the gauges inside the cab were damaged beyond salvaging. This further decreased any chance of the K&K bringing back operations, and on October 10 and 11, Cornell began auctioning off his remaining equipment as part of a liquidation process.

=== Everett Railroad ownership ===
While No. 58 was sold off to the Valley Railroad in Connecticut, No. 38 was purchased by Alan Maples, the president of the Everett Railroad, which is the same company that declined the idea of acquiring the locomotive fifty-four years prior. By the time the purchase took place, the railroad had also acquired No. 38's former stablemate from the Rail Town Historic Museum, No. 11. Within the following months, No. 38's boiler was separated from the frame and transported to the Western Maryland Scenic Railroad's (WMSR) shop complex in Ridgeley, West Virginia, for repairs while the frame, running gear, and tender were shipped to the Everett Railroad's shops in Claysburg, Pennsylvania. However, with the WMSR handling their own higher priorities, No. 38's boiler remained stored on a flatcar in the WMSR's yard. On February 25, 2016, the boiler was removed from the WMSR's property and moved with the rest of the locomotive's components in Claysburg. As of 2025, the restoration process on No. 38 has been going at a slow pace. The frame, tender, and cab are stored outdoors, while the boiler is stored inside the shops out of public view. Once restoration work is completed, No. 38 will join No. 11 in excursion service on the Everett's trackage.

== See also ==
- Arcade and Attica 18
- Lake Superior and Ishpeming 23
- Great Smoky Mountains Railroad 1702
- Rahway Valley 15
- New Hope Railroad 40
- Nevada Northern Railway Museum
