= William C. O'Neill Bike Path =

Rail trail in Rhode Island, United States

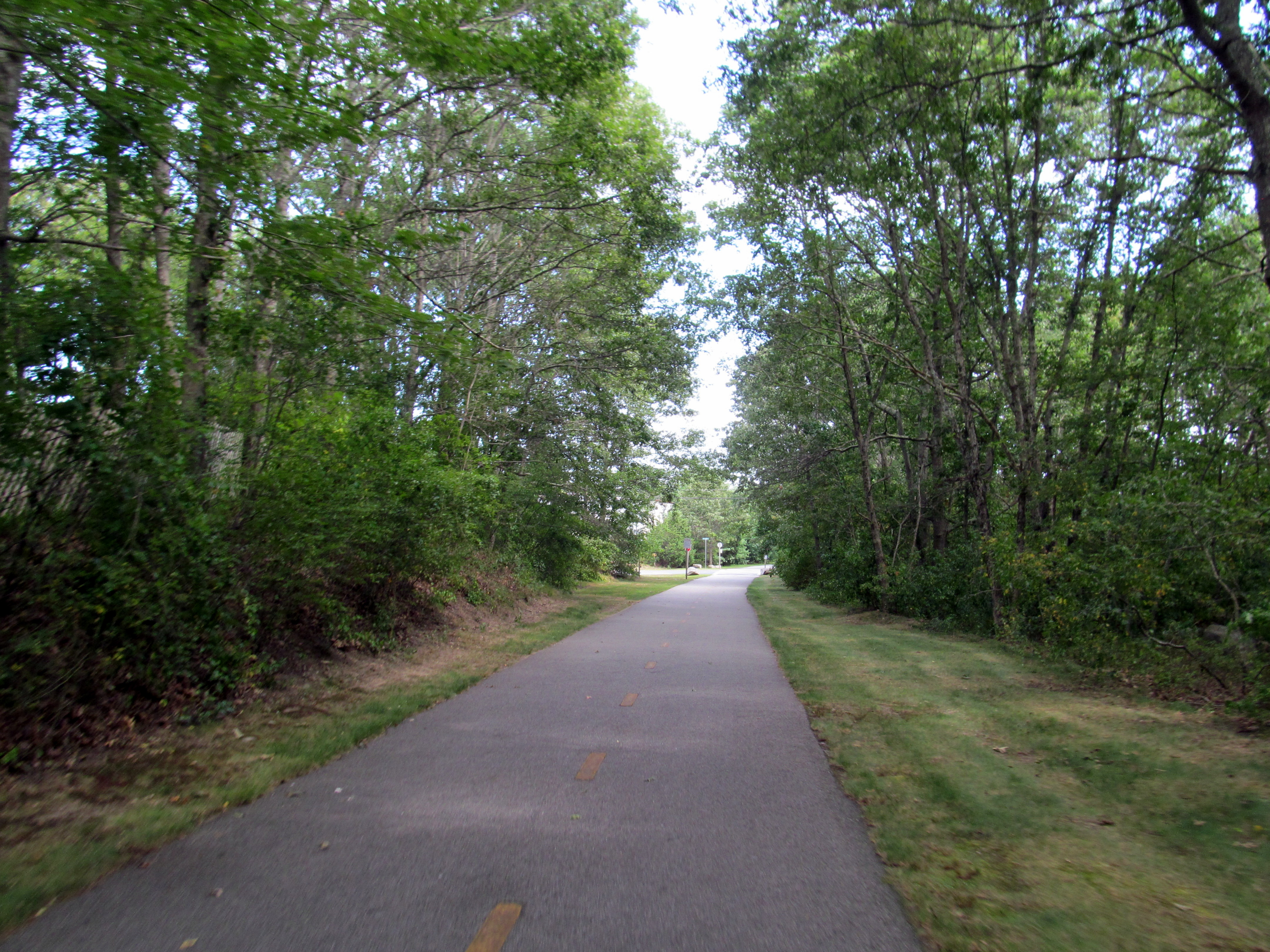
- The William C. O'Neill Bike Path in Peace Dale in 2013

William C. O'Neill Bike Path
- Length: 6.8 miles (11 km)
- Location: South Kingstown and Narragansett, Rhode Island, United States
- Established: 2000 (first section)
- Trailheads: Kingston station, West Kingston; Mumford Road, Narragansett
- Surface: Paved
- Right of way: Former Narragansett Pier Railroad
- Website: southcountybikepath.org

The William C. O'Neill Bike Path (also called the South County Bike Trail) is a paved rail trail extending from Kingston station parking lot in West Kingston, Rhode Island, to Mumford Road in Narragansett, Rhode Island. The whole path is in Washington County, Rhode Island. The trail is 6.8 miles (11 km) long, largely on the former right of way of the Narragansett Pier Railroad. An extension opened up to the University of Rhode Island in 2019. A future extension will bring it to Boston Neck Road (RI 1A).

== History ==
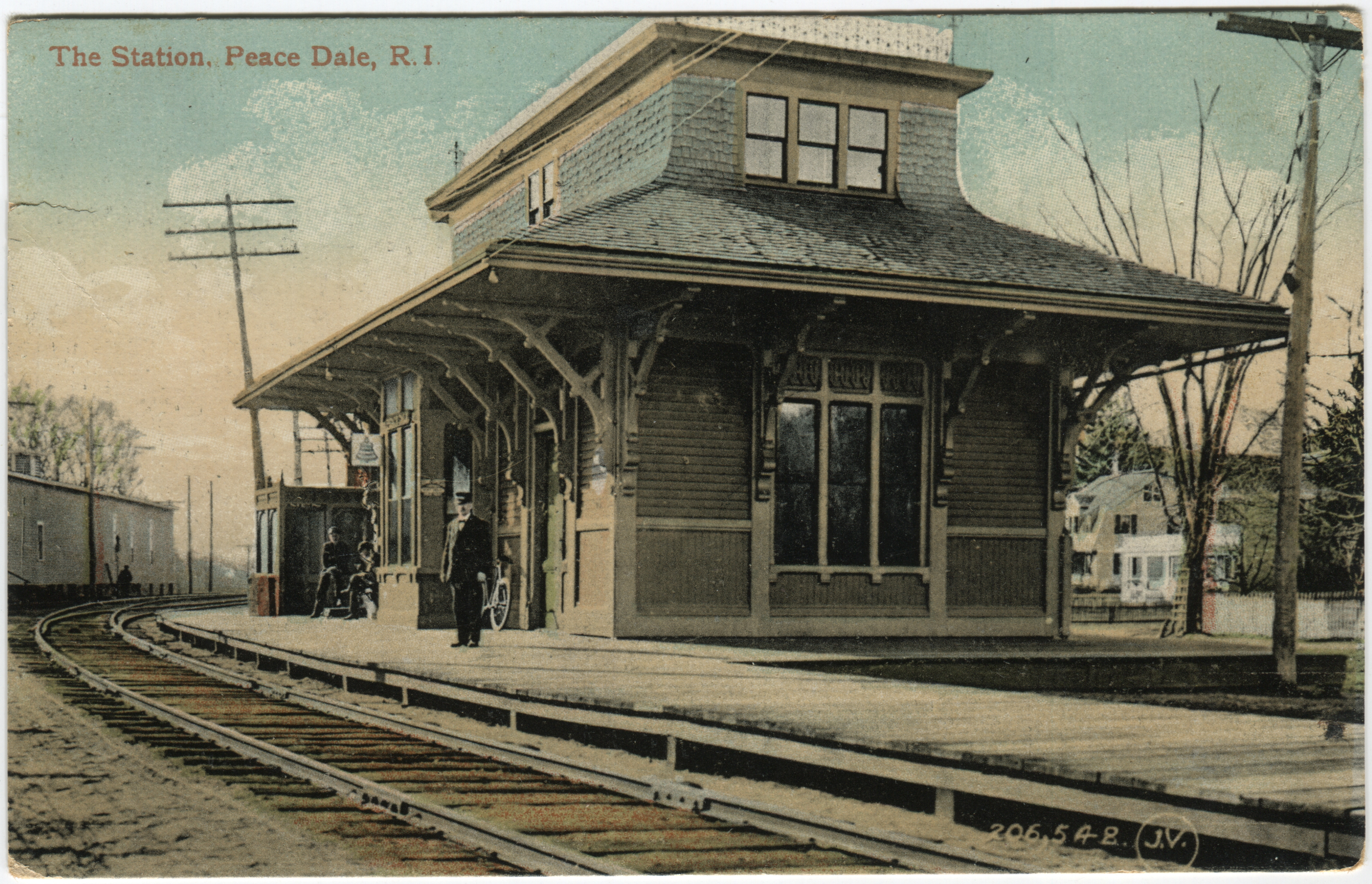
An early-20th-century postcard of Peace Dale station

The Narragansett Pier Railroad opened in 1876 to connect mills in Wakefield and Peace Dale to the New York, Providence and Boston Railroad at West Kingston. Passenger service ended in 1952, though freight service continued until the 1970s and the line was not fully abandoned until 1981.

In 1968, the line was proposed for use as a public school rail line, taking children to and from schools along the route, but this "visionary concept" failed to gain the requisite support. In 1981, Anthony Guariello—a local mill owner and town councilman—purchased the line with the possibility of conversion into a bike path for school children.

Conversion to a bicycle path was studied in 1991; in 1995, the Friends of the South County Bike Path was started to create the path. The first phase of the trail, running 4.2 miles (6.8 km) from Kingston station to Rodman Street, was completed in 2000. The 2.9-mile (4.7 km) Phase II was opened to Route 108 in 2003. Phase III, started in 2009, and opened in 2011, extended the trail a further 0.8 miles (1.3 km) (including a short section on a residential street) to the intersection of Mumford Road and Riverside Drive in Narragansett. According to the Rhode Island Department of Transportation, at 7.8 miles, the South County Bike Path is the fourth longest bike path in the state.

The last section of railroad right-of-way through Narragansett is not as well-preserved as the rest of the route; several parts are used for roads or residential developments. Instead, Phase IV will be routed through the Canonchet Farm, a local park, and reach the waterfront north of where the railroad did. Although more expensive than on-road alternatives, it will provide the safest route. The approximately-1-mile long extension was entered into funding proposals in early 2016.

A bond approved by RI voters in 2016 provided $10 million in funding to various bike path projects throughout the state. Included in the bond was funding for two new sections of the path: a 2.1-mile (3.4 km) connection from the University of Rhode Island to the path, and the first 0.26 miles (0.42 km) of Phase IV, connecting the existing path to the Narragansett Community Center. The connection to the University of Rhode Island opened in 2019 along with the short eastward extension. As of 2023, there have been no construction plans to extended the trail beyond its current termini.
