= Kingston station (Rhode Island) =

Railway station in Kingston, Rhode Island

Kingston, RI
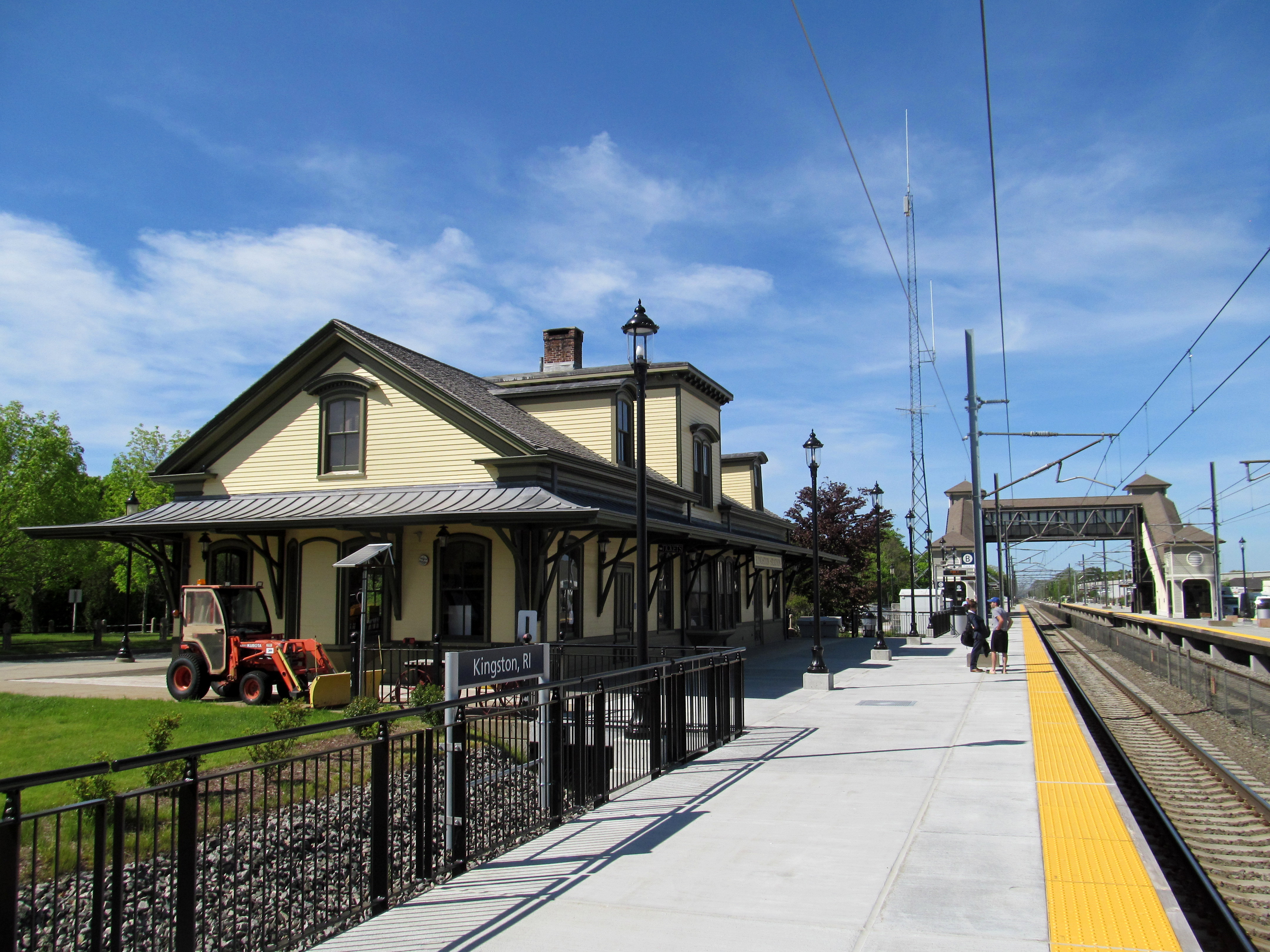
- Kingston station building and platforms in May 2017

General information
- Location: 1 Railroad Avenue; West Kingston, Rhode Island; United States
- Coordinates: 41.4840°N 71.5607°W
- Owner: State of Rhode Island
- Line: Amtrak Northeast Corridor
- Platforms: 1 side platform 1 island platform
- Tracks: 3
- Connections: RIPTA: 64, 66

Construction
- Parking: 150 spaces
- Cycle facilities: Yes
- Accessible: Yes
- Architectural style: Stick/Eastlake

Other information
- Station code: Amtrak: KIN

History
- Opened: June 1875 (current station)
- Rebuilt: May 31, 1998; October 30, 2017

Passengers
- FY 2025: 213,016 (Amtrak)

Services
Preceding station	Amtrak	Following station
Westerly toward Norfolk, Newport News or Roanoke	Northeast Regional	Providence toward Boston South
Acela does not stop here
Former services
Preceding station	Amtrak	Following station
Shannock toward New Haven	Beacon Hill	Wickford Junction toward Boston South
Preceding station	Penn Central	Following station
Kenyons toward Westerly	Westerly–Providence local 1971-1979	Wickford Junction toward Providence
Preceding station	New York, New Haven and Hartford Railroad	Following station
Kenyons toward New Haven	Shore Line	Wickford Junction toward Boston
- Kingston Railroad Station
- U.S. National Register of Historic Places
- NRHP reference No.: 78000018
- Added to NRHP: April 26, 1978
Location

Kingston is a historic railroad station located on the Northeast Corridor in the village of West Kingston, in the town of South Kingstown, Rhode Island. It was built at this location in 1875 by the New York, Providence and Boston Railroad, replacing earlier stations dating back to the opening of the line in 1837. Current rail services consist of Northeast Regional trains in each direction, most of which stop at the station. Historically Kingston provided commuter rail service to Providence and Boston via Amtrak's commuter rail services. The MBTA is looking at extending their commuter service on the Providence/Stoughton Line.

== History ==
=== 19th and 20th centuries ===
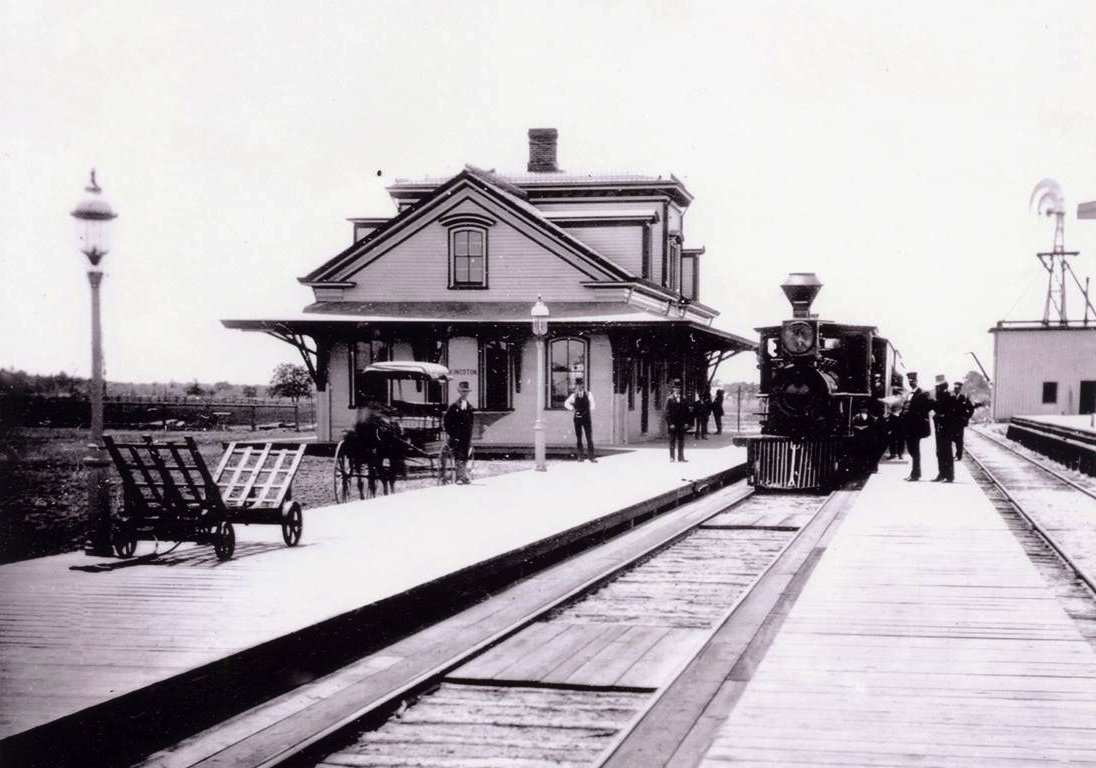
Kingston station in 1875

The New York, Providence and Boston Railroad opened in November 1837. Since its tracks did not go through the village of Kingston, a new village - West Kingston - sprang up around the railroad station on Waites Corner Road.

The station has remained in continuous use from the day it opened in June 1875. Historically, Kingston Station also served the Narragansett Pier Railroad. Travel time for the 8 1/2-mile (13.7 km) trip between Kingston and Narragansett Pier was approximately 20 minutes before passenger service ended unofficially in June, 1952. (In 2000 the former right-of-way was converted into the William C. O'Neill Bike Path.)

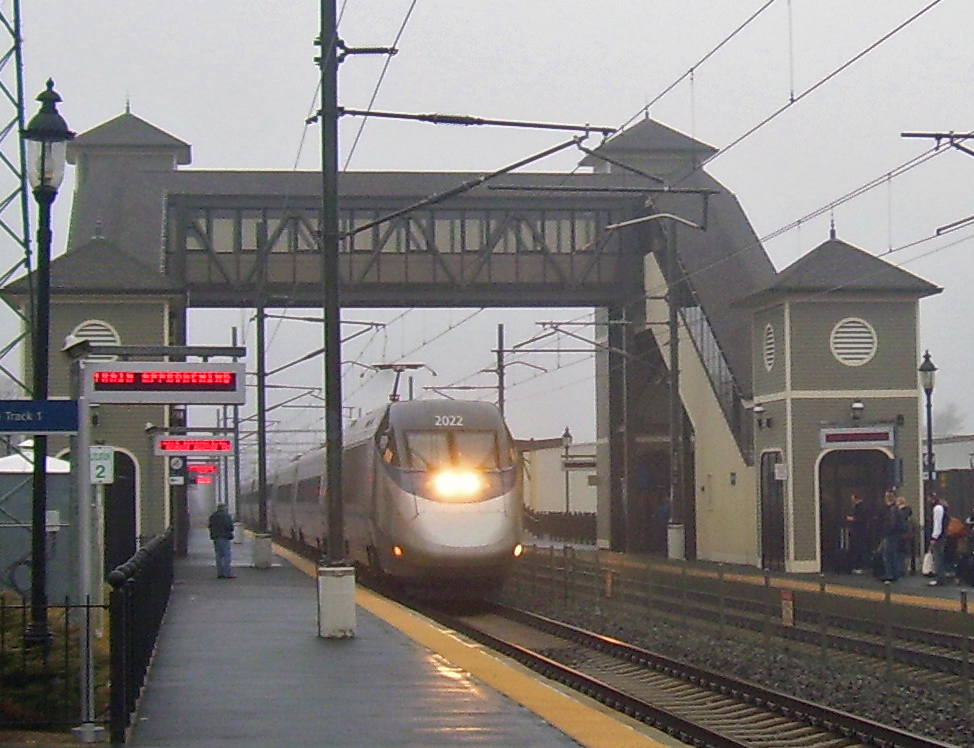
An Acela Express train passing through Kingston at 150 miles per hour (240 km/h) before platforms were raised

By the 1960s, service to Kingston consisted of regional service from Boston to New York City, plus a single commuter round trip from New London to Boston. When Amtrak took over intercity service from Penn Central in May 1971, Penn Central was not given license to discontinue the commuter trip. When permission was given in 1972, it was replaced with a state-funded Westerly-Providence round trip also stopping at Kingston. This trip lasted until June 1977. From September 1976 to October 1977 and January–April 1978 Amtrak's Clamdigger ran local service from Providence to New Haven with a stop at Kingston. The Beacon Hill replaced the Clamdigger in April 1978, running local from New Haven to Boston. Faced with declining ridership and the loss of state subsidies, the Beacon Hill was discontinued effective October 24, 1981, leaving Kingston with just intercity stopping service.

The station was added to the National Register of Historic Places on April 26, 1978 as Kingston Railroad Station.

An organization called "The Friends of Kingston Station" was instrumental in preserving the station and assuring its restoration after a fire there on December 12, 1988.

Although most Northeast Regional trains stop at Kingston, Acela trains do not. Kingston is located on one of several sections of track where the Acela Express is permitted to run at its top speed of 150 mph (240 km/h). Kingston and Mansfield are the only stations where the Acela will pass through at full speed on tracks adjacent to platforms. (Note: Attleboro, T. F. Green Airport, and Wickford Junction are also located on 150 mph (240 km/h) sections, but these stations have platform tracks not normally used by the Acela.) Signs and automated announcements warn passengers of the potential danger. Since it is the only station between New London and Providence that can deboard passengers from Acela trains due to its high-level platforms, they occasionally do stop at Kingston in emergencies such as downed wires or problems with the locomotives. (Note: Although Kingston did not have full-length high platforms until 2017, the mini-high platforms were sufficient for deboarding passengers if required. Of the other stations between New London and Providence, Mystic and Westerly have only low-level platforms, while the platforms at T. F. Green Airport and Wickford Junction are located on non-electrified sidings.)

=== Railroad museum ===
For a time, half of the station was home to the Rhode Island Railroad Museum. The museum, operated by Friends of The Kingston Railroad Station, was open Sunday afternoons, and included old artifacts from railroads in Rhode Island. Its highlight was an operating model railroad which depicted Kingston in 1948. The museum was closed because the second half of the building is needed due to increasing ridership at the station. The area will be renovated and used as a second waiting room with outlets and extra seating.

=== Infrastructure expansion ===
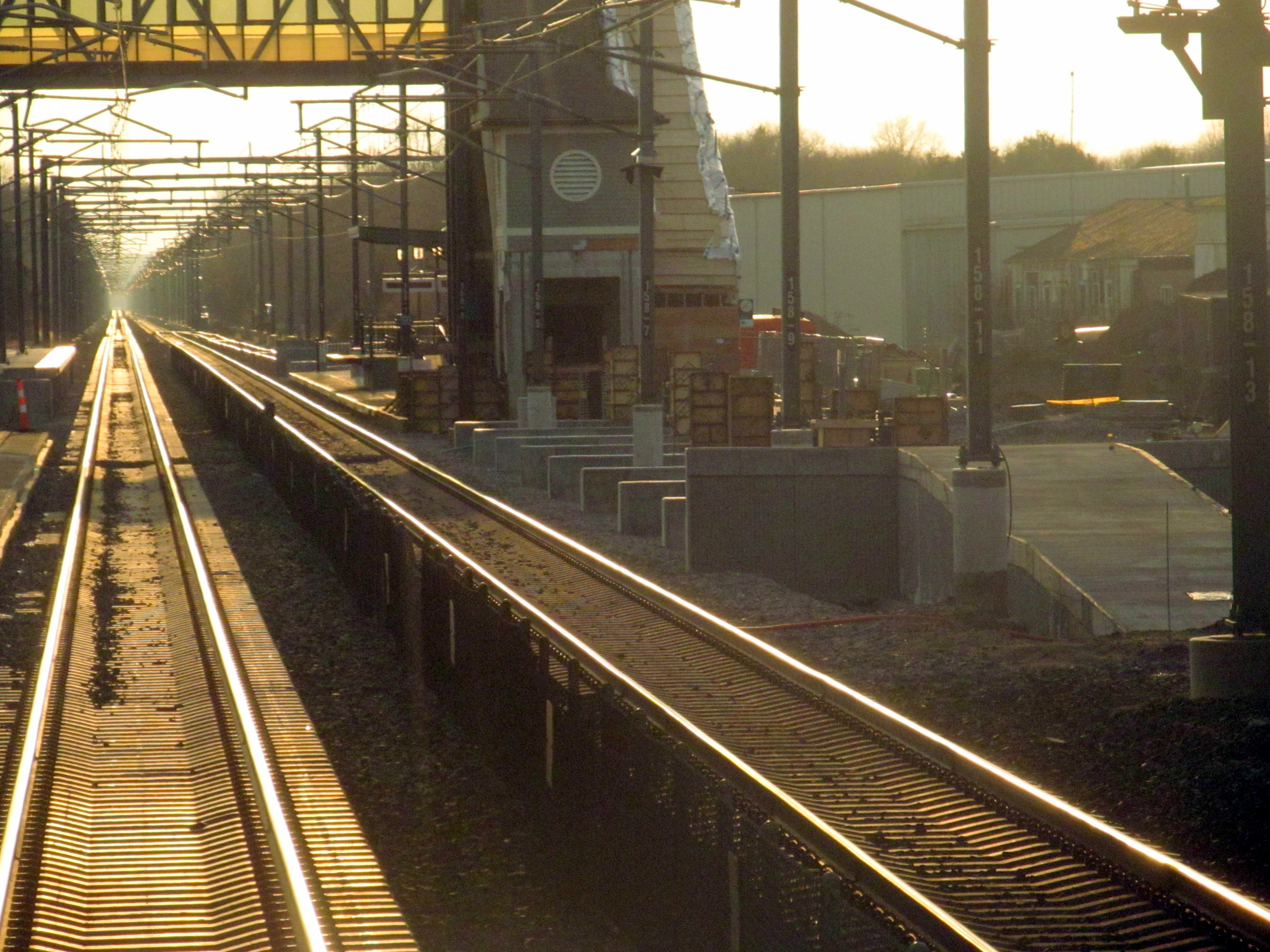
New high-level platforms under construction in January 2016

In 2009, RIDOT requested American Recovery and Reinvestment Act of 2009 funds for engineering of a siding and platform that would allow local trains to stop at the station, possibly including future MBTA Commuter Rail trains on an extension of the Providence/Stoughton Line. On June 29, 2015, Amtrak and local officials held a groundbreaking on the expansion of the station. This project will replace the current low-level platforms at the station with new, accessible high-level platforms and add a 1.5-mile-long (2.4 km) third track, allowing Acela Express trains to pass through the station while Northeast Regional or possible future commuter rail trains are stopped at the station. Construction work also incorporated installation of drainage, retaining walls and poles to support catenary wires for the new track as well as renovations to the interior of the station. The project was projected to cost $41 million, of which $26.5 million was provided via a High-Speed Intercity Passenger Rail Program (HSIPR) grant from the federal government and RIDOT, with Amtrak providing the remainder of the funding. Amtrak projected a completion of construction by summer 2017. Renovations to Kingston station were officially completed on October 30, 2017

=== Proposed commuter service ===
Currently, Kingston is one of only three stations on the Northeast Corridor - along with adjacent stations Westerly and Mystic to the south - that is served exclusively by Amtrak, with no commuter rail service. In 1994, a Rhode Island Department of Transportation (RIDOT) report indicated that the Northeast Corridor was the most viable route for commuter service in Rhode Island. That same year, a Federal Railroad Administration report estimated that Kingston-Providence service would begin in 1999. In 2001, RIDOT released a potential operations plans for South County commuter rail service from Westerly to Providence, with a stop at Kingston plus infill stops at Wickford Junction and T.F. Green Airport. The report considered the service as an extension of Shore Line East, an extension of the MBTA's Providence/Stoughton Line, or a stand-alone service. However, the 2003 Environmental Assessment and a 2009 report studying service to Woonsocket did not discuss extending service further south than Wickford Junction. Service to T.F. Green Airport began in December 2010, and to Wickford Junction in April 2012.

== See also ==
- National Register of Historic Places listings in Washington County, Rhode Island
