= Everett Railroad 11 =

Preserved American 2-6-0 locomotive

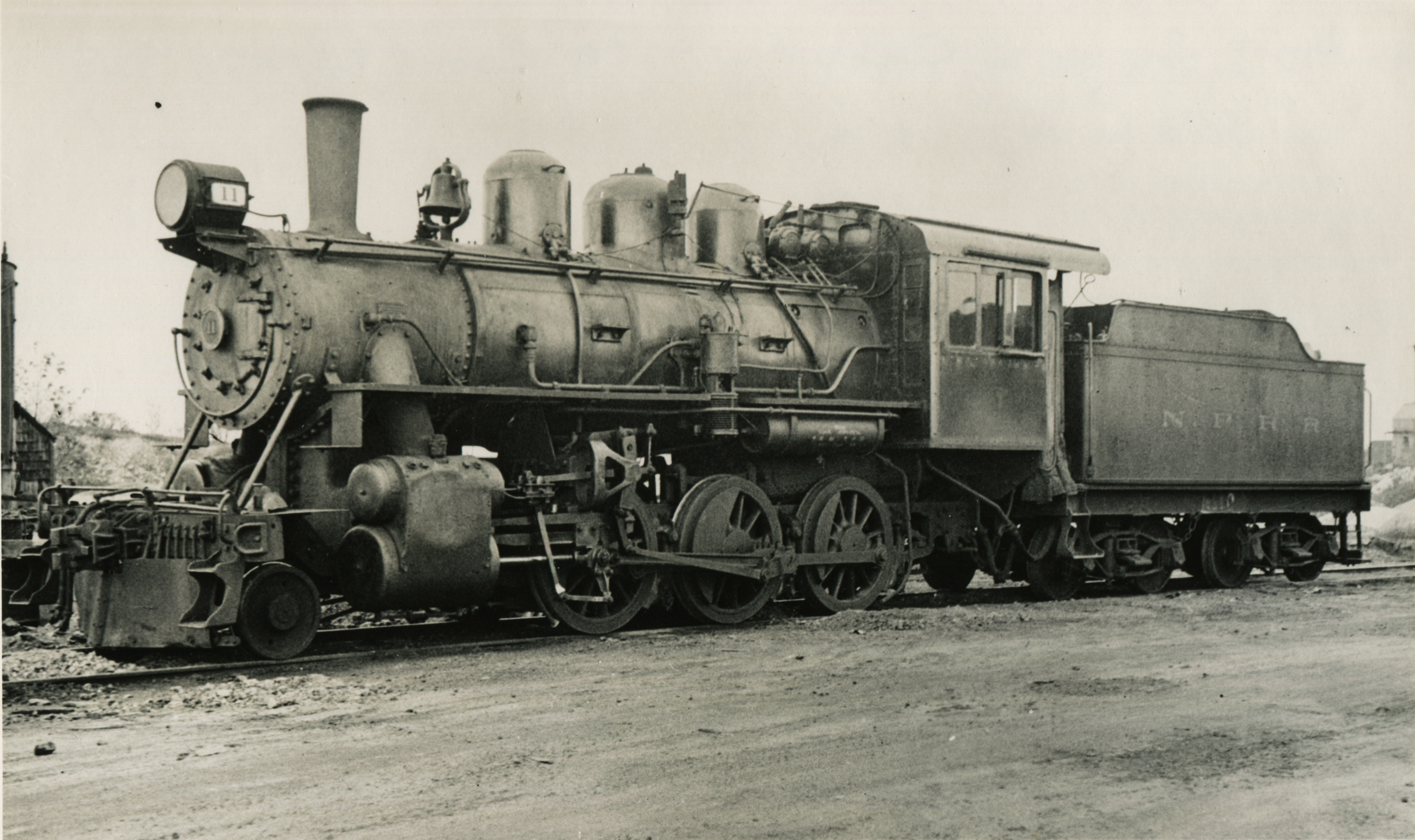
- No. 11 when it operated for the Narragansett Pier Railroad, circa 1934
Type and origin
- Power type: Steam
- Builder: American Locomotive Company (Cooke Works)
- Build date: 1920
Specifications
- Configuration
  - Whyte: 2-6-0
- Gauge: 4 ft 8 1/2 in (1,435 mm)
- Loco weight: 55 1/2 tonnes (122,000 lb)
- Fuel type: New: Coal; Now: Oil
- Cylinders: Two, outside
- Valve gear: Walschaerts
- Valve type: Piston valves
- Loco brake: Air
- Train brakes: Air
- Couplers: Knuckle
Career
- Operators: Narragansett Pier Railroad; Bath and Hammondsport Railroad; Rail City Museum; Everett Railroad
- Numbers: NAP 11; BH 11; EV 11
- Retired: 1949 (revenue service); 1972 (1st excursion service)
- Restored: July 4, 1955 (1st excursion service); October 2015 (2nd excursion service)
- Current owner: Everett Railroad
- Disposition: Operational

Everett Railroad 11 is a 2-6-0 'Mogul' type steam locomotive, built in 1920 by the American Locomotive Company's (ALCO) Cooke Works for export to Cuba, but it remained in the United States and was sold to the Narragansett Pier Railroad (NAP) in 1923. It was later operated by the Bath and Hammondsport Railroad (BH) until 1949. The locomotive was acquired by the Rail City museum in New York State in 1955, where it hauled excursion trains until 1972.

In 1977, No. 11 returned to the Narragansett Pier Railroad and was partially restored, then was sold to the Middletown and New Jersey Railroad (MNJ), where it was stored indoors. In 2006, No. 11 was purchased by the Everett Railroad (EV), who sent it to the Western Maryland Scenic Railroad's (WMSR) shops for a complete restoration. In October 2015, the restoration was completed, and No. 11 began hauling tourist trains for the Everett Railroad. In 2022, the locomotive was converted from coal to oil firing.

== History ==
=== Construction and revenue service ===
No. 11 was built in 1920 by the American Locomotive Company's (ALCO) Cooke Works, and it was one of 59 identical 2-6-0 'Mogul' locomotives built between 1920 and 1926 for export to Cuba. (Note: Although its builder's plate says March 1923, several printed sources confirmed it was officially built in 1920.) By that time, the sugar industry of Cuba was booming, and ALCO attempted to capitalize on the industry by offering to sell locomotives. Since the economy of Cuba was unstable, ALCO succeeded in exporting only forty 2-6-0s to the country, and the remaining nineteen locomotives, including No. 11, remained in storage while ALCO searched for domestic buyers. The locomotive was originally built to run on oil but was soon converted to coal firing.

In March 1923, No. 11 was purchased by the Narragansett Pier Railroad in Rhode Island. No. 11's first trip made it as far as Wakefield before coming to a sudden stop at a sharp curve. Railroad management realized the flanges on the drive wheels made navigating the curve at Wakefield impossible. This prompted a trip to the New York, New Haven and Hartford Railroad (New Haven) shops in Providence, Rhode Island, where workers fixed the problem by removing the flanges on the middle pair of drive wheels to create blind drivers.

As the newest locomotive, No. 11 continued service after older locomotives were retired, becoming the railroad's only locomotive in 1926. Insufficient maintenance meant No. 11 spent much of its time in the engine house for repairs, with rentals from the New Haven filling in at significant cost. This finally grew unbearable by 1930, when the company purchased outright a used 4-4-0 "American" locomotive from the New Haven, numbered 20.

No. 11 continued at the Narragansett Pier Railroad until 1937, when a combination of higher operating costs, the increasing age of the company's locomotives, and decreasing revenue led to the railroad retiring all of their steam locomotives in favor of a Plymouth Locomotive Works gasoline switcher. No. 11 was then sold to the Bath and Hammondsport Railroad (B&H) in New York State. The B&H operated No. 11 until 1949, when the railroad adopted dieselization. Instead of scrapping the obsolete locomotive, the B&H kept it within their roundhouse until a buyer could be found.

=== Preservation ===
In July 1955, preservationist Stanley A. Groman purchased No. 11 for a new museum he was planning in Sandy Pond, New York, to be called Rail City. The locomotive hauled tourist trains on a 1-mile (1.6 km) circle line at Rail City until the mid-1970s, when declining patronage forced its closure.

By 1977, the Narragansett Pier Railroad was owned by John Miller, a dentist who lived in Newtown, Connecticut, and planned to redevelop the railroad as a museum. Miller announced his intention to reacquire No. 11 from Rail City for passenger excursions. No. 11 was subsequently shipped to the Narragansett Pier, and restoration work begun, but not completed. In 1981, No. 11 was sold to the Middletown and New Jersey Railroad (M&NJ), whose president Pierre Rasmussen held a personal interest in steam locomotives and hoped to run No. 11 on the railroad. By the time of Rasmussen's death in 2004, the locomotive had spent more than two decades inside the M&NJ roundhouse without any further restoration progress.

=== Everett Railroad ===
Ownership of No. 11 ended up with James Wright, who had done business with the M&NJ. Two years later, in 2006, the Everett Railroad's president, Alan Maples, purchased No. 11 with the desire to run his own steam program. No. 11 was sent to the Western Maryland Scenic Railroad's (WMSR) workshop in Ridgeley, West Virginia, where the WMSR began the locomotive's restoration under contract. Crews at the WMSR performed multiple tasks on No. 11; the frame was reconditioned, the running gear rebuilt, and some parts of the boiler were replaced. In March 2015, No. 11 was moved to the Everett Railroad shops in Claysburg, Pennsylvania, where the remainder of its restoration took place, which involved additional replacement parts being installed for the boiler and running gear.

In August, No. 11 underwent a hydrostatic test and a test fire, both of which were deemed successful. Following reassembly, the locomotive hauled its first train on the railroad in October 2015. In 2022, No. 11 was converted to use oil due to difficulties in securing coal and the desire to cut down the amount of smoke it generated. This was a return to No. 11's original configuration, as it was converted to coal firing shortly after construction. On May 6, 2023, No. 11 hauled a fundraising excursion that benefited the restoration of Pennsylvania Railroad 1361, sponsored by the Railroaders Memorial Museum.

== See also ==
- Canadian National 89
- Huntingdon and Broad Top 38
- McCloud Railway 25
- Southern Pacific 1744
- Valley Railroad 3025

== Book sources ==
- Henwood, James N.J. (1969). A Short Haul to the Bay: A History of the Narragansett Pier Railroad. Brattleboro, Vermont: The Stephen Greene Press. ISBN 08289-0101-5.
