= Everett Railroad =

Railroad in Hollidaysburg, Pennsylvania

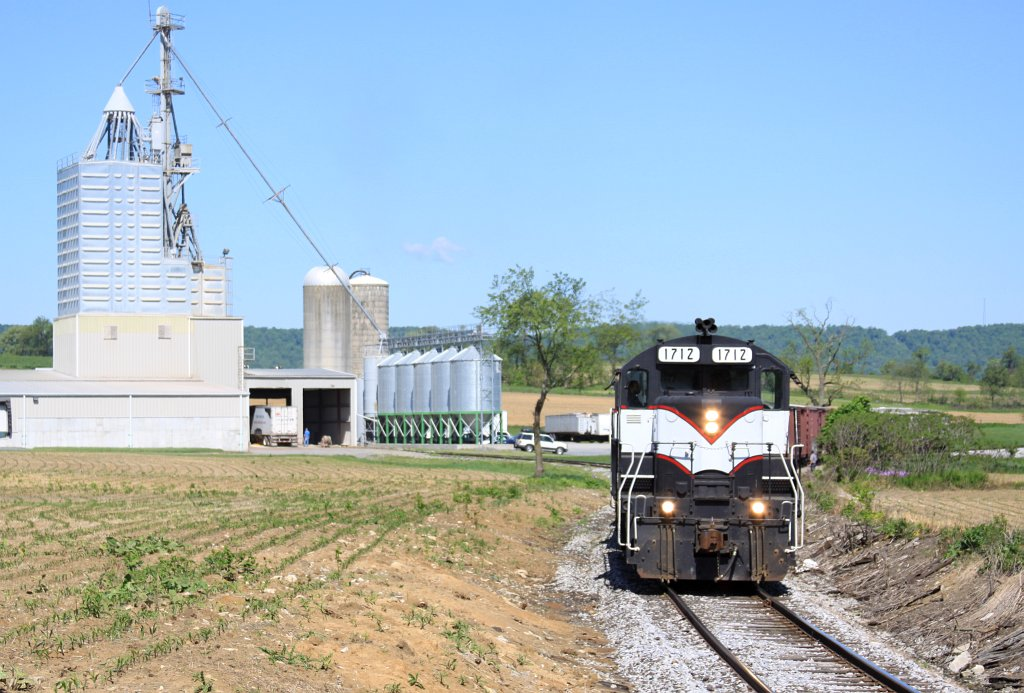
- Everett Railroad GP16 1712 passing Renaissance Nutrition near Martinsburg, PA.

Overview
- Headquarters: Duncansville, Pennsylvania
- Reporting mark: EV
- Locale: Pennsylvania
- Dates of operation: 1954–1982; 1984–present

Technical
- Track gauge: 4 ft 8 1/2 in (1,435 mm) standard gauge
- Length: 23 mi (37 km)

Other
- Website: everettrailroad.com

The Everett Railroad (reporting mark EV) is a shortline and heritage railroad that operates on ex-Pennsylvania Railroad trackage in the Hollidaysburg area of the U.S. state of Pennsylvania. It runs freight trains over two separate lines, one from Brooks Mill and Sproul, and the other, owned by the Morrison's Cove Railroad, from Roaring Spring to Curryville and Martinsburg.

The affiliated Hollidaysburg and Roaring Spring Railroad (reporting mark HRS), which the Everett Railroad operates both under contract and via trackage rights, connects the two segments to each other and to the Norfolk Southern Railway (ex-Conrail) in Hollidaysburg. The Everett Railroad name refers to its former location near Everett, abandoned in 1982.

== History ==
The Everett Railroad was incorporated in April 1954 to take over a portion of the Huntingdon and Broad Top Mountain Railroad and Coal Company (H&BT) near Everett, which was abandoned in May of that year. The line, which extended north from the end of the Pennsylvania Railroad's Mt. Dallas Branch at Mount Dallas to a point near Tatesville, parallel to PA Route 26, had been constructed from 1859 to 1863 by the Bedford Railroad, which was merged into the H&BT in 1864.

Conrail discontinued service on the then-Mt. Dallas Secondary in October 1982, severing the Everett Railroad's ties to the outside world and forcing its abandonment.

The company was revived in May 1984, when it acquired a part of Conrail's Bedford Secondary between Brooks Mill and Sproul. Completed in 1910 by the Bedford and Hollidaysburg Railroad, a predecessor of the Pennsylvania Railroad, this line had connected to the Mt. Dallas Secondary near Bedford until 1982.

A second line, the Morrison's Cove Secondary from Roaring Spring to Curryville, along with a short branch into Martinsburg, was acquired by the Morrison's Cove Railroad, organized by local shippers, in mid-1982. The shippers initially contracted with the Allegheny Southern Railway (reporting mark ASRW), which operated the line from September 1982 to the end of 1984, but on January 1, 1985, the Everett Railroad took over operations. This line had been constructed by the Pennsylvania Railroad itself in 1871.

Conrail continued to operate the remainder of the Morrison's Cove Secondary, from Roaring Spring through Brooks Mill to Hollidaysburg, until Alan W. Maples, owner of the Everett Railroad, organized the Hollidaysburg and Roaring Spring Railroad (H&RS) and bought the line in March 1995. Simultaneously, the Everett Railroad acquired trackage rights to Hollidaysburg, and began operating the H&RS under contract.

== Equipment ==
=== Locomotives ===
Locomotive details
Number	Image	Type	Model	Built	Builder	Serial number	Former owner	Status
11		Steam	2-6-0	1920	American Locomotive Company (Cooke Locomotive Works)	62635	Narragansett Pier Railroad, Bath and Hammondsport Railroad	Operational
38		Steam	2-8-0	1927	Baldwin Locomotive Works	59946	Huntingdon and Broad Top Mountain Railroad and Coal Company	Under restoration
4		Diesel	80-ton switcher	1943	General Electric	18065	United States Army Transportation Corps	Stored
18		Diesel	65-ton switcher	1950	General Electric	30497	East Jersey Railroad and Terminal Company	Stored
1712		Diesel	GP16	1950	Electro-Motive Diesel	13538	Clinchfield Railroad, Seaboard Coast Line Railroad, Seaboard System Railroad, CSX Transportation, R.J. Corman Railroad Group	Operational
1828		Diesel	GP16	1952	Electro-Motive Diesel	17370	Seaboard Air Line Railroad, Seaboard Coast Line Railroad, Seaboard System Railroad, CSX Transportation, R.J. Corman Railroad Group	Operational

=== Former units ===
Locomotive details
Number	Images	Type	Model	Built	Builder	Serial number	Owner	Status
11		Steam	2-6-2	1909	Baldwin Locomotive Works	33333	Everett Railroad Station Museum	Display
561		Diesel	Dash 8-32B	1989	General Electric	46516	Western Maryland Scenic Railroad	Operational
