= Sea View Railroad (Rhode Island) =

Interurban streetcar line in Rhode Island, United States

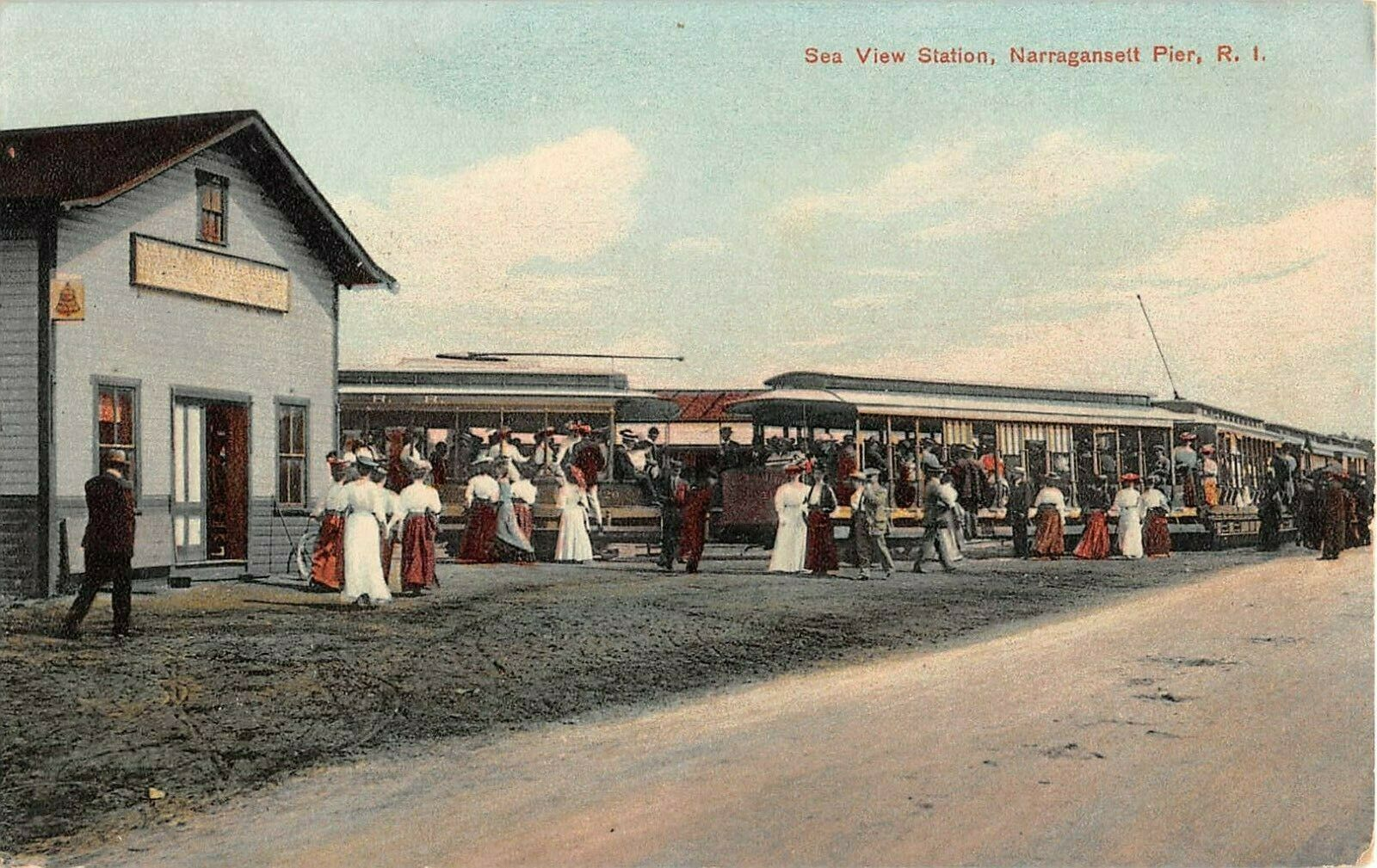
- A postcard of Sea View Railroad trolleys at Narragansett Pier circa 1907-1915

Overview
- Dates of operation: 1900–1920

Technical
- Track gauge: 4 ft 8 1/2 in (1,435 mm) standard gauge
- Electrification: Overhead line

The Sea View Railroad was an interurban streetcar line running south from East Greenwich to Narragansett, Wakefield, and Peace Dale. Originally chartered in 1887, construction began in 1899 and the railroad opened between East Greenwich and Narragansett Pier in 1900. Private right-of-way began after crossing south into North Kingstown from East Greenwich.

In addition to passengers, the railroad also maintained a significant business carrying freight, including coal and agricultural products. The Sea View Railroad signed an agreement with the Narragansett Pier Railroad in 1902, whereby overhead lines were extended along the latter company's line from Narragansett Pier to Wakefield for use by Sea View trolleys. When the agreement expired in 1907 the Narragansett Pier Railroad refused to renew it; as a result the Sea View commenced building its own line to Wakefield (with an ultimate destination of Westerly) in 1908. The expansion attempt made it as far as Robinson Street in Wakefield before reaching the Narragansett Pier Railroad line, the owners of which refused to allow the Sea View to cross.

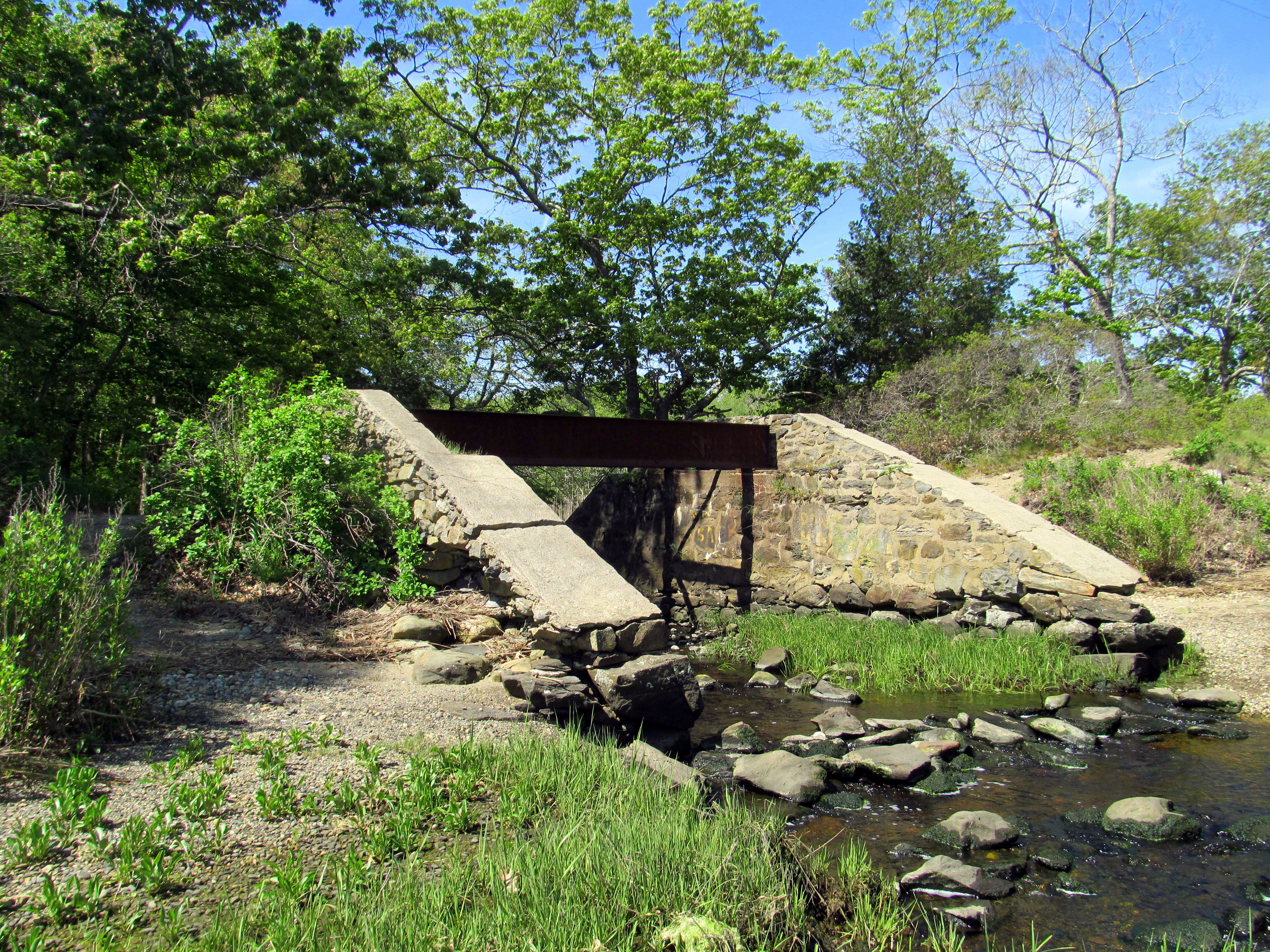
A former Sea View Railroad bridge in North Kingstown

The Rhode Island Company purchased the Sea View Railroad in 1906, operating it until 1918 before it reverted to its previous owners, who had by that time heavily neglected the line's maintenance. The president of the Narragansett Pier Railroad, Nathaniel T. Bacon, purchased the bonds of the Sea View Railroad in September 1920. The railroad experimented with a gas-electric railcar that could potentially run on both the Sea View and the Narragansett Pier. However, Bacon sold the Sea View Railroad for scrap two months later when a financing plan with the towns along its route fell through.
