= West Kingston, Rhode Island =

Coordinates: 41.484°N 71.556°W

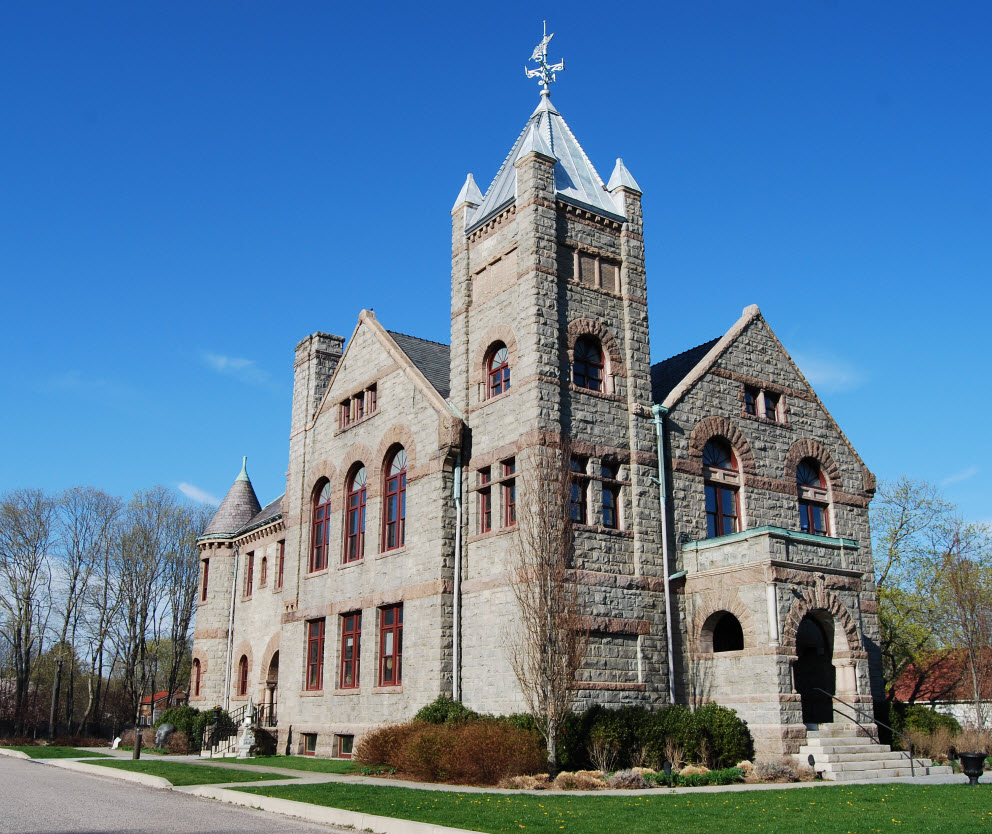
Old Washington County Courthouse in the village of West Kingston

West Kingston is an unincorporated village and traditional county seat of Washington County, Rhode Island, United States. It is the site of the Kingston Railroad Station Amtrak station, and is a part of the Town of South Kingstown.

== Overview ==
Although unincorporated, West Kingston has a post office and recognized mailing address location. It shares the ZIP code 02892 with much of western South Kingstown, a large portion of Richmond, Rhode Island to the west, and small parts of Exeter to the north. However, West Kingston is not a part of the latter two towns.

The William C. O'Neill Bike Path starts in the village of West Kingston at the train station, and runs through most of South Kingstown, ending in Narragansett.

== See also ==
- Scouting in Rhode Island
