= Burbank =

Burbank may refer to:

== Places ==
=== Australia ===
- Burbank, Queensland, a suburb in Brisbane

=== United States ===
- Burbank, California, a city in Los Angeles County
- Burbank, Santa Clara County, California, a census-designated place
- Burbank, Illinois, a city
- Burbank Township, Kandiyohi County, Minnesota
- Burbank, Missouri, an unincorporated community
- Burbank, Ohio, a village
- Burbank, Oklahoma, a town
- Burbank, South Dakota, an unincorporated community
- Burbank, Utah, an unincorporated community
- Burbank Hills, Utah, a small mountain range
- Burbank, Washington, a census-designated place

== Schools ==
- Burbank High School (disambiguation)
- Luther Burbank Middle School (disambiguation)
- Burbank Elementary School (disambiguation)

== People and fictional characters ==
- Burbank (surname)

== Other ==
- Russet Burbank potato, named after Luther Burbank
- Burbank station (DART), a light rail station in Dallas, Texas
- A. L. Burbank & Company, Ltd, a shipping company in operation 1928–2014
