= Providence station =

Railway station in Providence, Rhode Island, US

Providence, RI
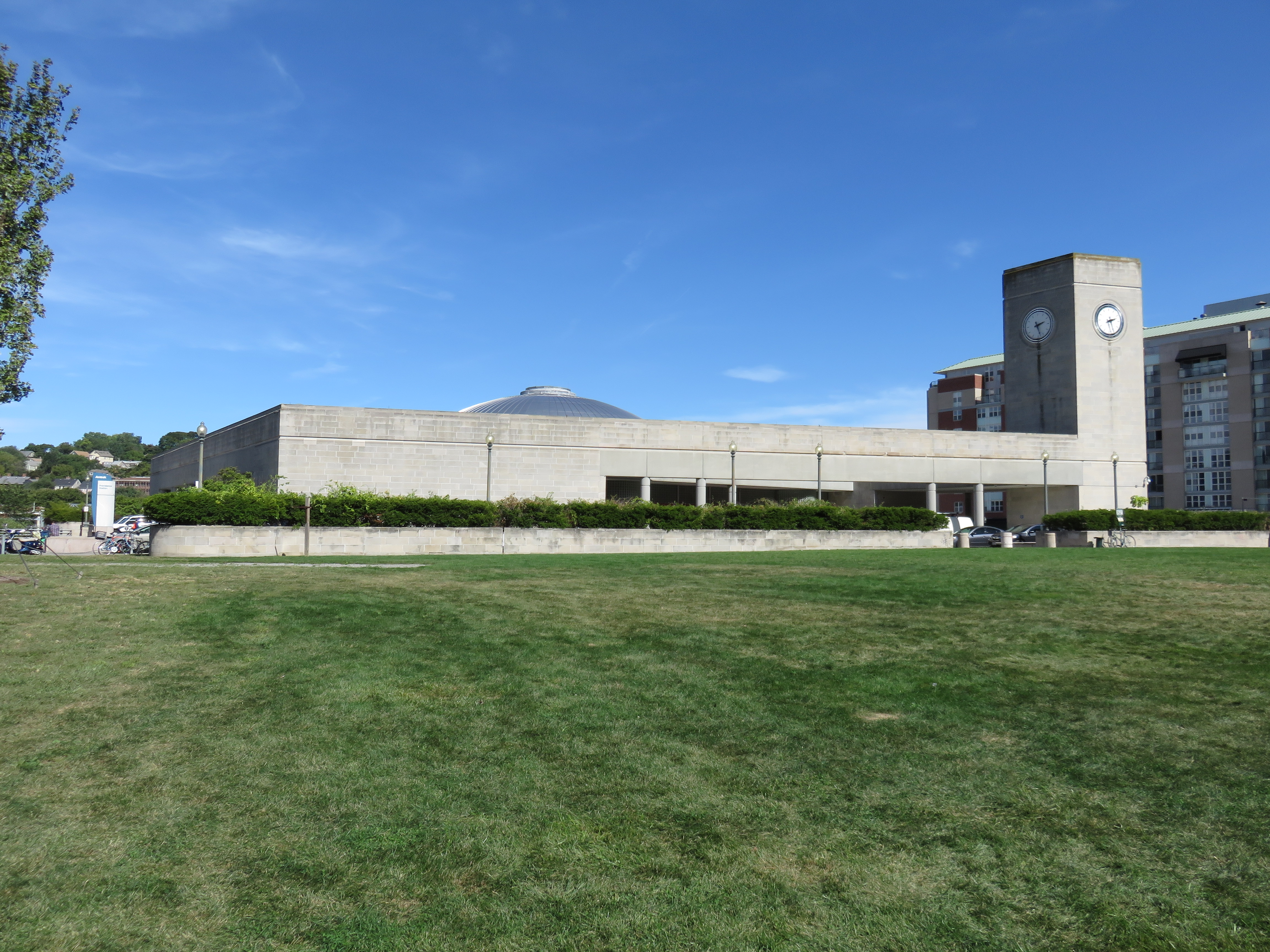
- Providence station in 2015

General information
- Location: 100 Gaspee Street; Providence, Rhode Island; United States
- Coordinates: 41.82909°N 71.41325°W
- Owner: Amtrak
- Line: Amtrak Northeast Corridor
- Platforms: 2 island platforms
- Tracks: 5 (4 passenger; 1 freight)
- Connections: RIPTA: R-Line, 3, 4, 50, 51, 54, 55, 56, 57, 58, 66, 72; Amtrak Thruway

Construction
- Parking: Yes
- Cycle facilities: Yes
- Accessible: Yes

Other information
- Station code: Amtrak: PVD
- IATA code: ZRV

History
- Opened: 1986

Passengers
- FY 2025: 797,019 annually (Amtrak)
- 2024: 1,462 daily boardings (MBTA)
Services
Preceding station	Amtrak	Following station
New Haven toward Washington, D.C.	Acela	Route 128 toward Boston South
Kingston toward Norfolk, Newport News or Roanoke	Northeast Regional	Route 128 toward Boston South
Preceding station	MBTA	Following station
T. F. Green Airport toward Wickford Junction	Providence/Stoughton Line	Pawtucket/Central Falls toward South Station
Terminus	Foxboro event service	Pawtucket/Central Falls toward Foxboro
Former services
Preceding station	Amtrak	Following station
New Haven toward New York	Cape Codder 1986–1996	Attleboro 1986–1989 toward Hyannis
New Haven toward New York	Cape Codder 1986–1996	Taunton toward Hyannis
See Union Station (Providence) for earlier services
Track layout
Track layout
Location

Providence station is a railroad station in Providence, Rhode Island, served by Amtrak and MBTA Commuter Rail. The station has four tracks and two island platforms for passenger service, with a fifth track passing through for Providence and Worcester Railroad freight trains. The station was built in 1986, replacing the former Union Station, during a project to remove elevated tracks from downtown Providence. It is fully accessible for all trains.

== Design and service ==
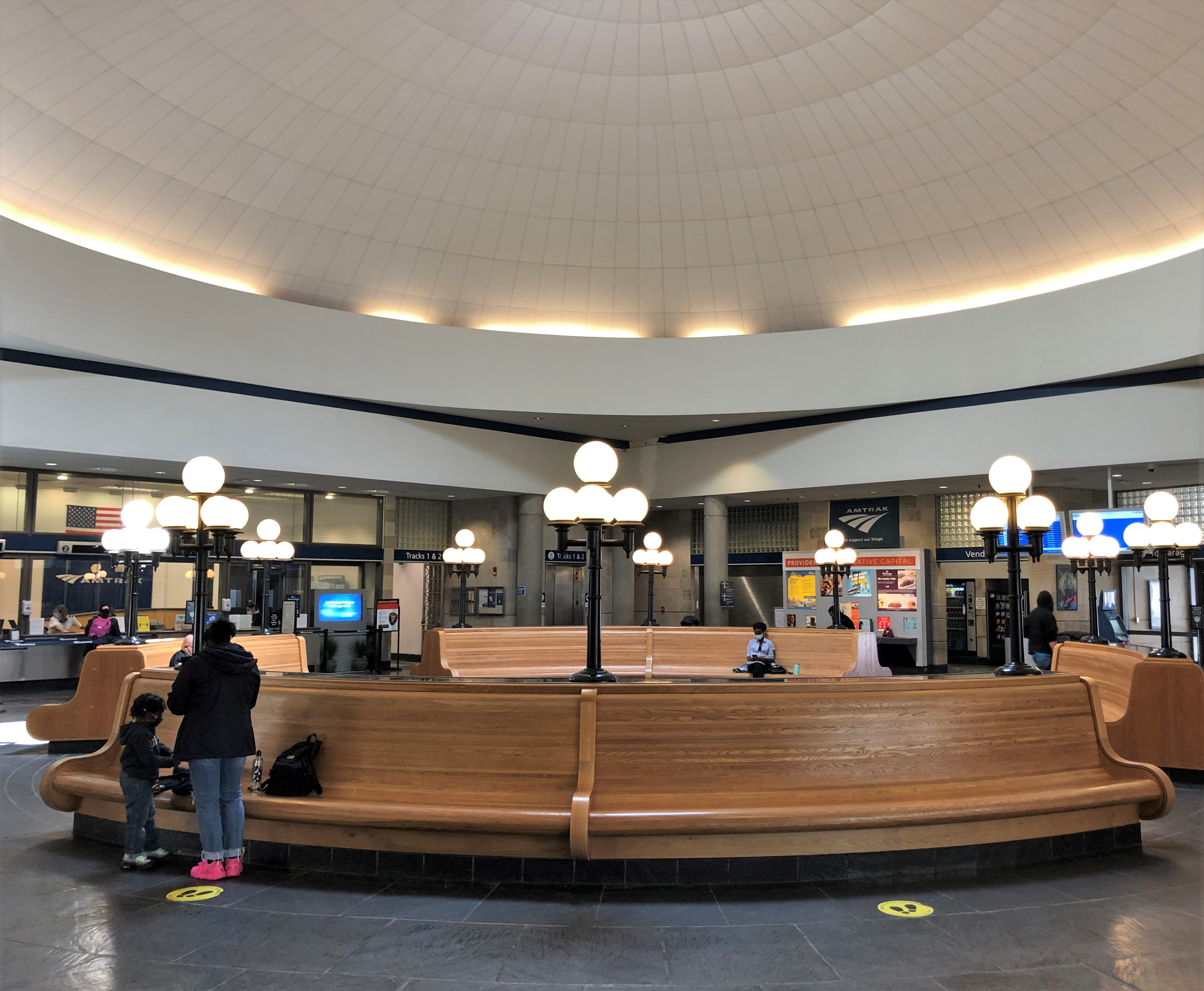
The domed interior of the station

The station was designed in the Washington, D.C. office of Skidmore, Owings and Merrill by Milo Meacham under the direction of Marilyn Jordan Taylor. It is a simple building in the brutalist style, with a large square clocktower. Although largely subterranean and lacking the grand scale that was possible when Union Station was built in 1898, the station has been positively received by critics. The project received a citation in the 1983 Progressive Architecture Awards. Local architectural historian William McKenzie Woodward lauded the building for its aesthetics, calling its saucer dome "an obvious yet very gracious gesture toward the State House". In 2010, Architect praised the forethought of the designers in planning for the revitalization of Providence's downtown, saying that "[i]ts design accommodated the complex geometries of a circulation pattern oriented toward the Capitol and a structure aligned with the tracks, while its splayed plan opened out to what was then an imagined city, one that Providence eventually made happen."

Providence station is served by two Amtrak intercity routes – Acela Express and the Northeast Regional – both of which run between Boston and Washington, D.C. Amtrak Thruway bus service connects Providence with Worcester and New Bedford. It is also served by MBTA Commuter Rail Providence/Stoughton Line commuter service, which runs between Wickford Junction and Boston. Providence is the southern terminus of some weekday service and all weekend service on the line. In a 2018 count, Providence averaged 2,091 inbound MBTA passengers on weekdays, making it the second-busiest station on the system (after Salem) outside of Boston

The station has four passenger tracks serving two island platforms, plus the FRIP (Freight Rail Improvement Project) freight track on the west side. The south platform is usually used by Amtrak, while the north platform is usually used by the MBTA. The FRIP track is used by Providence and Worcester Railroad freight trains, plus MBTA trains south of Providence station.

Kennedy Plaza, the main hub for RIPTA bus service, is located one-quarter mile (0.4 km) to the south along Exchange Street. RIPTA routes R-Line, 3, 4, 51, 54, 58, 66, and 72 stop at the south side of Providence station on Park Row; routes 50, 55, 56, and 57 stop on Gaspee Street on the north side of the station.

== History ==
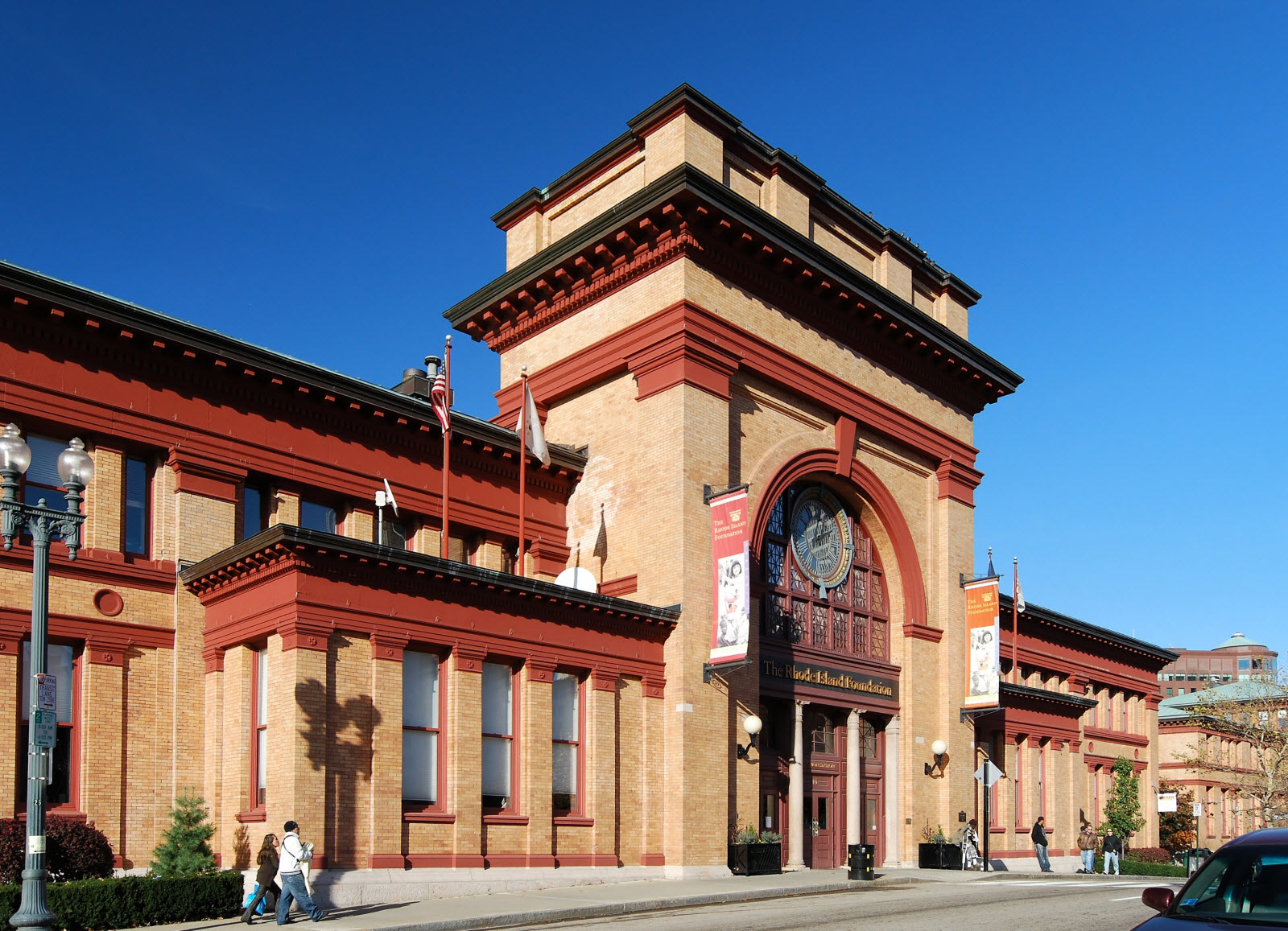
The second Union Station, which has been renovated for other uses

Providence's first railroad station was built in 1835 by the Boston and Providence Railroad at India Point. The Providence and Stonington built a depot at Crary Street in South Providence in 1838, and the two were soon connected by a ferry service.

The first through service stopped at Union Station, a brick edifice built in 1847 by the Providence & Worcester, Providence & Stonington, and Boston & Providence Railroads. It was designed by 21-year-old architect Thomas Alexander Tefft. The building was lost to fire in 1896 and was replaced by a larger Union Station, completed in 1898 by the New Haven Railroad. It consisted of five large brick structures, which still form the northern side of Kennedy Plaza in the center of Downtown Providence.

Amtrak has served Providence since its inception in 1971, with Northeast Corridor trains from Boston to New York and Washington. Local commuter service - both intrastate service and service to Boston - has been intermittent during this era. After Penn Central discontinued its New London-to-Boston commuter train in 1972, Rhode Island sponsored a short-lived Westerly-to-Providence service (which lasted until 1979) in addition to the MBTA's Providence-to-Boston service. Sunday service ended in October 1977 and off-peak and Saturday service ended in April 1979 due to Rhode Island's limited subsidies; rush-hour service ceased on February 20, 1981.

In 1986, the Northeast Corridor through Providence was relocated north to free up land from a mass of elevated tracks, popularly called the "Chinese Wall," that had hemmed in downtown Providence. The new and smaller station was built across Gaspee Street from the Rhode Island State House. The five tracks and two platforms are located below ground level underneath the station building.

Rush-hour MBTA commuter service began again (to the new station) in February 1988, with off-peak service added in December 2000 and weekend service added in July 2006. A new layover facility for MBTA commuter trains, located north of the station in Pawtucket, opened in 2006, allowing the MBTA to increase service to the city. Service was further extended to T.F. Green Airport in December 2010 and to Wickford Junction in April 2012. Additionally, some game-day service to Foxboro has run from Providence since 1997, as well as from 1971 to 1973. Special trains run for New England Patriots football games as well as some New England Revolution soccer games and college sporting events. The first revenue Acela Express service to Providence was on December 11, 2000, concurrent with the expansion of MBTA service.

In August 2019, the Federal Railroad Administration awarded RIDOT up to $12.5 million for a 'major rehabilitation' of the station. The $25 million project is also funded by RIDOT ($5.25 million) and Amtrak ($7.25 million). In March 2025, RIPTA identified two sites adjacent to the station as preferred locations for a new bus terminal to replace Kennedy Plaza. In August 2026, the RIPTA board voted to begin design and engineering for the Station Park site just west of the station building.
