= The End of Oak Street (soundtrack) =

2026 film soundtrack album

The End of Oak Street (Original Motion Picture Soundtrack)

Film score by Michael Giacchino
- Released: August 7, 2026
- Studios: Warner Bros. Eastwood Scoring Stage, Burbank, California
- Genre: Film score
- Length: 68:32
- Label: WaterTower Music
- Producer: Michael Giacchino

Michael Giacchino chronology
Spider-Man: Brand New Day (2026)	The End of Oak Street (Original Motion Picture Soundtrack) (2026)	Klara and the Sun (2026)

The End of Oak Street (Original Motion Picture Soundtrack) is the film score to the 2026 science fiction survival film The End of Oak Street directed by David Robert Mitchell starring Anne Hathaway, Ewan McGregor, Maisy Stella and Christian Convery. The score is written by Michael Giacchino and was released through WaterTower Music on August 7, 2026.

== Background ==
In March 2026, it was announced that Michael Giacchino would compose the score for The End of Oak Street in his maiden collaboration with Mitchell. He was involved in the project owing to producer J. J. Abrams, whom Giacchino had been involved in his earlier films. The score was recorded at the Warner Bros. Eastwood Scoring Stage in Burbank, California, with a 78-piece orchestra from the Hollywood Studio Symphony performing the score conducted by Jennifer Hammond, orchestration led by Jeff Kryka with Paul Apelgren and Logyn Okuda, and Alyssa Park and Roger Wilkie serving as the concertmasters.

== Release ==
The score was released through WaterTower Music on August 7, 2026, a week prior to the film's release. An exclusive double LP album was distributed by Mutant and is scheduled for a November 2026 release.

== Reception ==
Jonathan Broxton of Movie Music UK wrote "Giacchino has spent most of his career demonstrating that huge genre concepts work best when the music finds the human story underneath them; The End of Oak Street is another excellent example of precisely that philosophy." Filmtracks wrote, "the music for The End of Oak Street is on par with the quality and appeal of Super 8, with similar melodic grace at either end. As translated to album, the score competes with none of the vintage songs heard in the film. Listeners not interested in the rather stock suspense and action for the dinosaurs will definitely want the bookends. Be prepared to cull those highlights, because they are enough to merit a fourth star overall. But you still can't help but lament Giacchino's persisting inability to capture the magic that Williams brought to the 1980's with the same tools, whether due to lesser thematic resonance, the awfully dry mix, or other intangibles that restrain this music to its existence as an echo of the greatness it emulates."

James Southall of Movie Wave wrote "[Michael Giacchino] keeps turning these things out and maintaining such a high quality bar and I can confidently say that there's no fan of [him] who won't absolutely love The End of Oak Street." Zachary Lee of RogerEbert.com wrote "There's a playfulness to Michael Giacchino's score which plays up its operatic and grandiose sensibilities before switching gears to something more sinister. Take a scene where Giacchino plays a more heroically upbeat composition when someone looks to escape the teeth of an Allosaurus, only for that person to be eaten a beat later, the triumphal music still playing."

David Ehrlich of IndieWire wrote "Michael Giacchino's zippily instructive score would be there to put things back on track if it did; the first music cue switches from upbeat wonder to ominous portent and back again in the span of just a few seconds, as if to say 'buckle up for something that's fun and exciting, but always safe enough that you never really have to get scared.'" Jake Coyle of Associated Press wrote "Composer Michael Giacchino does his best John Williams impression to match." John Nugent of Empire called it a "sweeping, John Williams-esque score". David Rooney of The Hollywood Reporter called it "frantic score" amped up the film. Richard Whittaker of The Austin Chronicle wrote "the score by Michael Giacchino sounds jarringly like Jerry Goldsmith clumsily pastiching John Williams". Nikki Baughan of Screen International wrote "Michael Giacchino's soaring, John Williams-esque score emphasising the fantastical elements of the narrative."

== Track listing ==
The End of Oak Street (Original Motion Picture Soundtrack)
No.	Title	Length
1.	"A Thin Flowervale Between Life and Death"	1:18
2.	"Horticulture Club"	2:06
3.	"A Good Fence Is the Best Defense"	0:37
4.	"Father and Father Away"	1:24
5.	"The Family Loners"	0:56
6.	"The Light in the Static"	1:11
7.	"Let Sleeping Dogs Library"	0:55
8.	"Something Weird This Way Comes"	1:19
9.	"No More Mr. Nice Geyser"	2:33
10.	"A Den of Coelophysis or The Swamp Drains You"	10:12
11.	"Strung Out Theory"	2:48
12.	"A Few Fries Short of a Happy Mel"	1:51
13.	"Spoiled Platts, Pt. 1"	3:12
14.	"Spoiled Platts, Pt. 2"	3:13
15.	"Lurch and Rescue"	2:09
16.	"Sphere Street Blues"	1:36
17.	"Reunion Station"	1:43
18.	"One Good Mate Deserves Another"	1:04
19.	"Once and for Allosaurus"	4:49
20.	"Don't Be Sorrow with Me"	1:27
21.	"Mi Casa Boo Casa"	6:06
22.	"The Starbuck Stops Here"	2:39
23.	"Old Pool Politics"	3:15
24.	"I Need a Little Space-Time"	2:28
25.	"The Swap of the Ages"	1:12
26.	"Main on End of Days"	1:44
27.	"The End of Oak Suite"	4:45
Total length:		68:32

== Additional music ==
The following songs are featured in the film, but not on the soundtrack:

- "Hit Me with Your Best Shot" by Pat Benatar
- "Shake It Up" by The Cars
- "Don't Let Him Know" by Prism
- "Turning Japanese" by The Vapors
- "Flame Of Love" by Raven
- "Get Your Radio" by The Secrets
- "Ain't Got You" by The Willy Waller Band
- "Arie And Lee" by Juli Brace
- "Hey" by Blue Shoes
- "Valerie" by Steve Winwood
- "More Than This" by Roxy Music
- "Find Your Way Back" by Jefferson Starship

== Personnel ==
Credits adapted from Film Music Reporter:

- Music composer and producer: Michael Giacchino
- Music supervisor: George Drakoulias
- Music editor: Paul Apelgren
- Recording and mixng: Warren Brown
- Score recordist: Tom Hardisty
- Digital score recordist: Vincent Cirilli
- Lead orchestrator: Jeff Kryka
- Orchestrators: Paul Apelgren, Logyn Okuda
- Music preparation: Booker White
- Score librarian: Nicholas Cazares
- Score conductor: Jennifer Hammond
- Concertmasters: Alyssa Park, Roger Wilkie
- Music contractors: Regge Wilson, Connie Boylan, Keith Wilson
- Score coordinator: Jordana Paris Hatas
- Music clearance: Alicia Richards
- Music coordinator: Dash Gordon
