= Pawtucket/Central Falls station =

Railway station in Rhode Island, US

Pawtucket/Central Falls
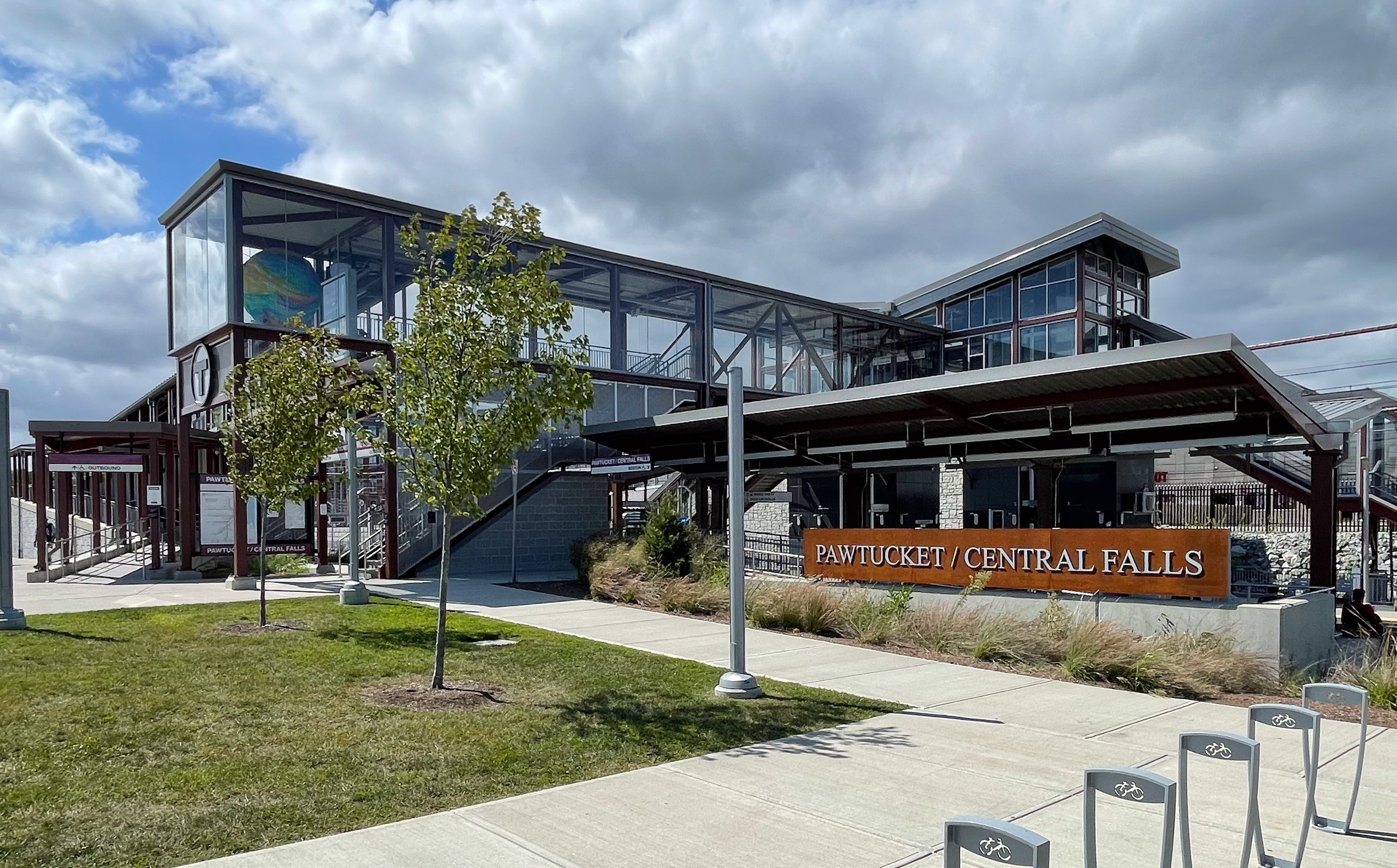
- August 2024

General information
- Location: 300 Pine Street; Pawtucket, Rhode Island
- Coordinates: 41.8787°N 71.3922°W
- Line: Amtrak Northeast Corridor
- Platforms: 2 side platforms
- Tracks: 3
- Connections: RIPTA: R-Line, 1, 71, 72, 73, 75, 76, 78, 80, QX

Construction
- Parking: 201 spaces
- Accessible: Yes

Other information
- Fare zone: 8

History
- Opened: 1847; January 23, 2023
- Closed: February 20, 1981
- Rebuilt: June 16, 1916

Passengers
- 2024: 658 daily boardings

Services
Preceding station	MBTA	Following station
Providence toward Wickford Junction	Providence/Stoughton Line	South Attleboro toward South Station
Providence Terminus	Foxboro event service	South Attleboro toward Foxboro
Former services
Preceding station	MBTA	Following station
Providence Terminus	Providence/Stoughton Line Station closed 1981	Attleboro toward South Station
Preceding station	New York, New Haven and Hartford Railroad	Following station
Providence toward New Haven	Shore Line	Attleboro toward Boston
Providence Terminus	Providence and Worcester Railroad	Valley Falls toward Worcester
Location

Pawtucket/Central Falls station is a commuter rail station in Pawtucket, Rhode Island. It opened for MBTA Commuter Rail Providence/Stoughton Line service on January 23, 2023. The station has two side platforms serving the two tracks of the Northeast Corridor. It is also a hub for RIPTA local bus service.

A former station, located slightly northeast on the border of Pawtucket and Central Falls, opened in 1916 to replace separate stations in the two cities. The station building was closed in 1959, and passenger service ended in 1981. The derelict station building, located above the Northeast Corridor tracks, is still extant.

== History ==
=== Combined station ===
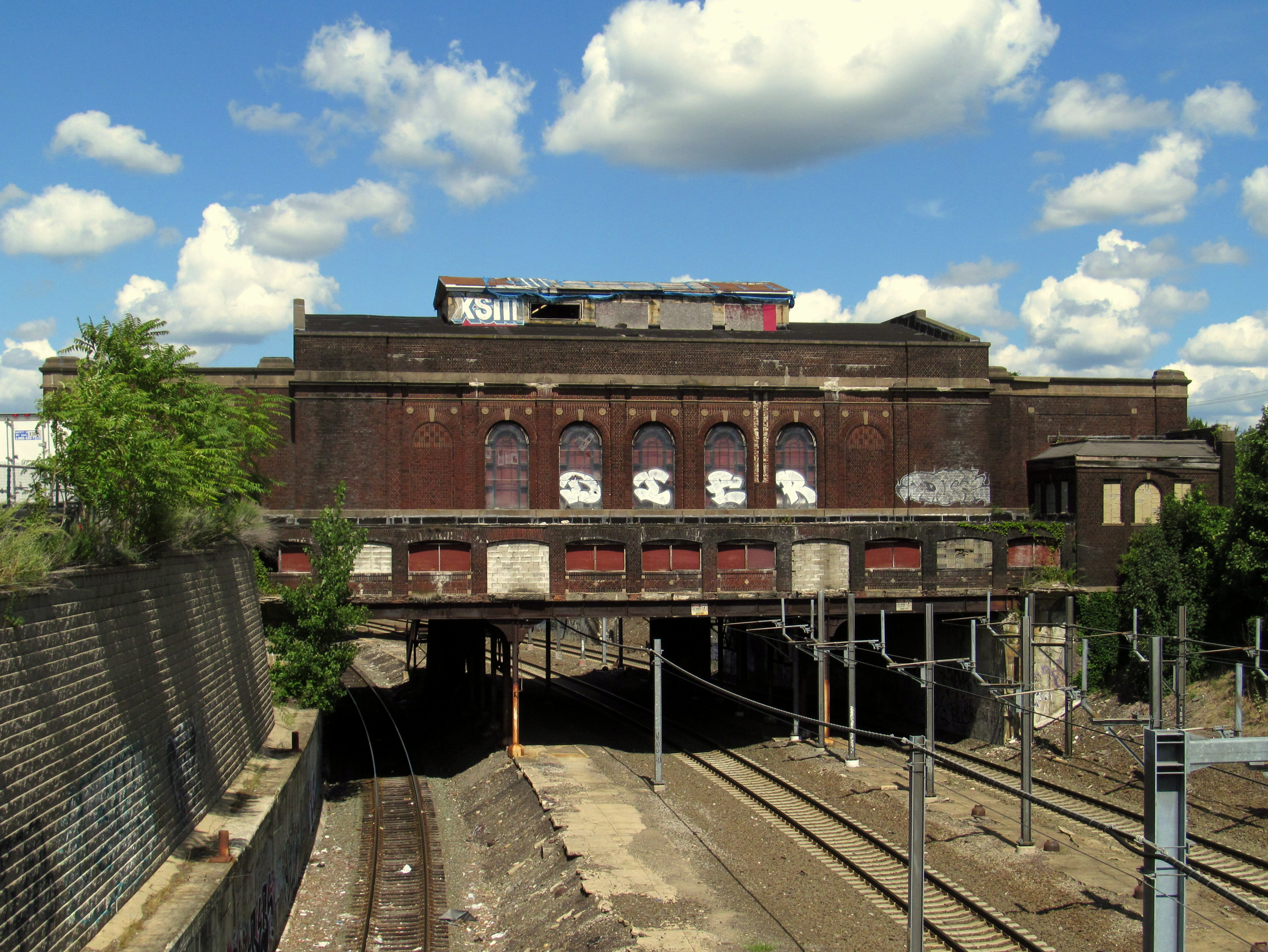
The former station in August 2015

The station was originally built in 1915-16 by the New York, New Haven and Hartford Railroad as a replacement for two separate stations in both Pawtucket and Central Falls as part of a grade separation program. The project was approved on April 29, 1912; grade crossings were eliminated on April 11, 1914, and trains began using the new alignment on December 20. The new station opened for passengers on January 16, 1916. It was originally built with two island platforms and four tracks, with each platform serving one center main track and one siding.

In 1959, the station building itself was in disrepair and was closed. Thereafter passengers accessed the platforms via stairways from Barton Street. The station was served by New Haven Railroad trains, then later by MBTA Commuter Rail, until Rhode Island stopped funding service past Attleboro on February 20, 1981. The station building was considered for nomination to the National Register of Historic Places in 1984, but this was deferred due to concerns about its structural integrity. During the Northeast Corridor Electrification Project in the 1990s, the station tracks were relocated to increase clearances for the Acela Express to tilt when going around the curve. The center main tracks were replaced with a single southbound main track, while the northbound siding track was replaced with a new northbound main track. The southbound siding is now the "FRIP track" (Freight Rail Improvement Project) for the exclusive use of Providence and Worcester Railroad freight trains.

=== New station ===
==== Planning ====
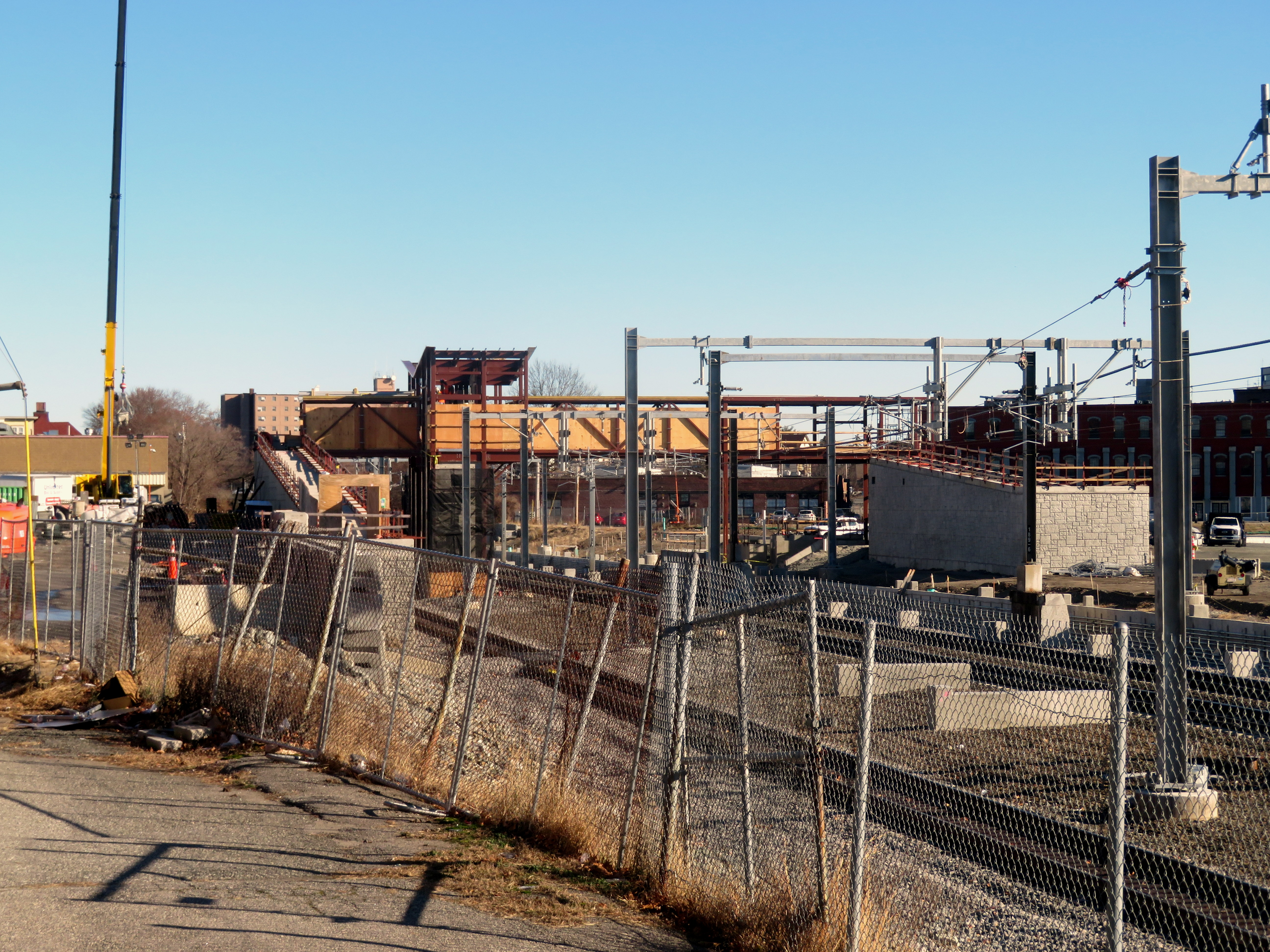
The station under construction in 2021

When Rhode Island resumed funding MBTA service to Providence in 1988, the Pawtucket/Central Falls stop was not resumed due to limited funding and the deteriorated condition of the station. The MBTA opened a new station at South Attleboro on June 20, 1990 to reach the Pawtucket/Central Falls market without adding a second stop in Rhode Island, which Rhode Island did not wish to pay for. The station site at Route 1A is located less than a mile east of the point where the line enters Rhode Island, and offered room for a parking lot whereas the downtown Pawtucket location did not. However, it is too far from the old location to be walkable for most Pawtucket and Central Falls residents, and until 2013 RIPTA buses were prohibited by federal law from crossing the state line to deliver passengers to the station.

In the early 1990s, Rhode Island began planning for a substantial increase in commuter rail service, with more service to Boston as well as Providence-focused intrastate service. With South Attleboro station open, the need for a downtown Pawtucket/Central Falls station was initially discounted. A 1994 RIDOT study of rail corridors in the state analyzed commuter rail service to Woonsocket, but a Pawtucket station was not included. During the next decade, the state focused on adding additional Boston-Providence trains and extending service to the South County area with stations at T. F. Green Airport and Wickford Junction. In 1998, RIDOT began planning a layover yard - but no station - in Pawtucket; the $18.5 million facility began construction in May 2003 and opened in July 2006.

In 2005 the City of Pawtucket began discussions with RIDOT about adding a Pawtucket stop in addition to the South County service. The city commissioned a $344,000 study, released in 2007, which estimated between 1,080 and 1,161 daily riders to Boston, 269 to 562 daily riders to Providence, and 27 to 45 daily riders to T.F. Green Airport. The study considered reopening the former station with new platforms to the north, or building an all-new station at the Providence and Worcester Railroad yard to the south. The renovated station was estimated to cost $58.5 million versus $45.1 million for an all-new station, but the former was recommended based on better walkability, fewer impacts to businesses, and concerns about toxic materials in the rail yard.

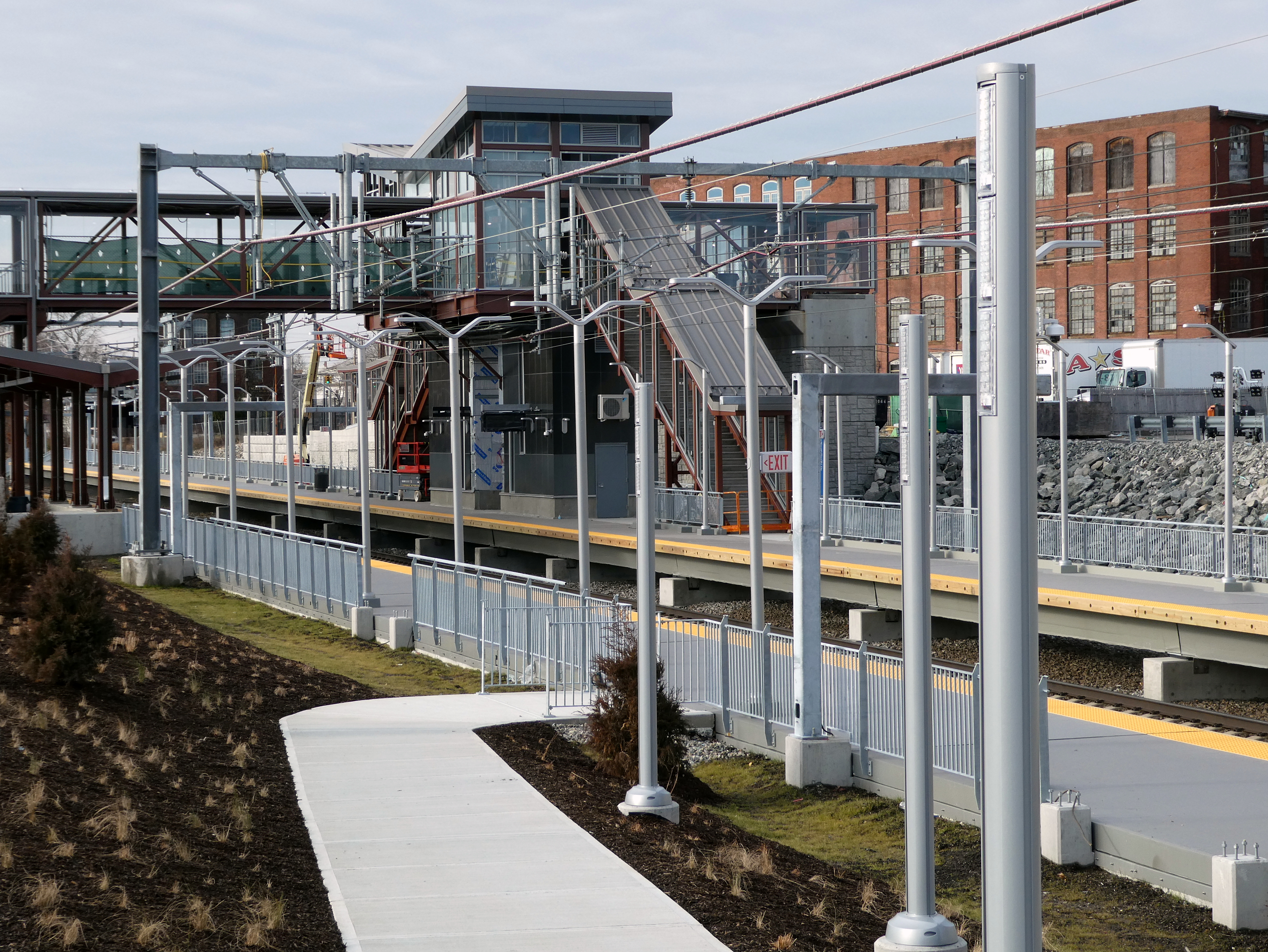
The station nearing completion in December 2022

Reusing the former station site was determined to be impractical after further analysis. The dilapidated condition of the building would markedly increase costs, and the track geometry was unsuitable for a modern station: there is insufficient room in the trench to add additional tracks to allow Amtrak trains to pass stopped commuter trains, and the sharp curve makes high-level handicapped accessible platforms impossible to build without large platform gaps.

In April 2016, RIDOT submitted an application for a $14.5 million TIGER grant, which would part of the $40 million construction cost of the new station. If the grant was approved, the state would contribute $3.6 million and the two cities $3.0 million, with federal funding expected to cover the remaining half. Environmental review and preliminary design was to be completed by September 2016, with a $3.0 million design contract awarded in December. The TIGER application lowered the expected ridership to 519 daily boardings, of which all but 89 would be diverted from Providence and South Attleboro.

==== Construction and opening ====
In October 2016, state and city officials unveiled a sign marking the site of the planned station. Ground for the new station was broken in November 2018. After construction delays, the station opened on January 23, 2023. RIPTA bus routes in Pawtucket were also moved to the new station. The station reached 400 daily boardings within the first week, close to projections of 520 daily. RIDOT indicated it would expand the 200-space parking lot, which was already at capacity, later in 2023. Ridership was at 439 daily boardings by May 2023. Construction of the 275-space lot expansion began that July and opened in January 2024. The station had 701 daily boardings in a March 2024 count.

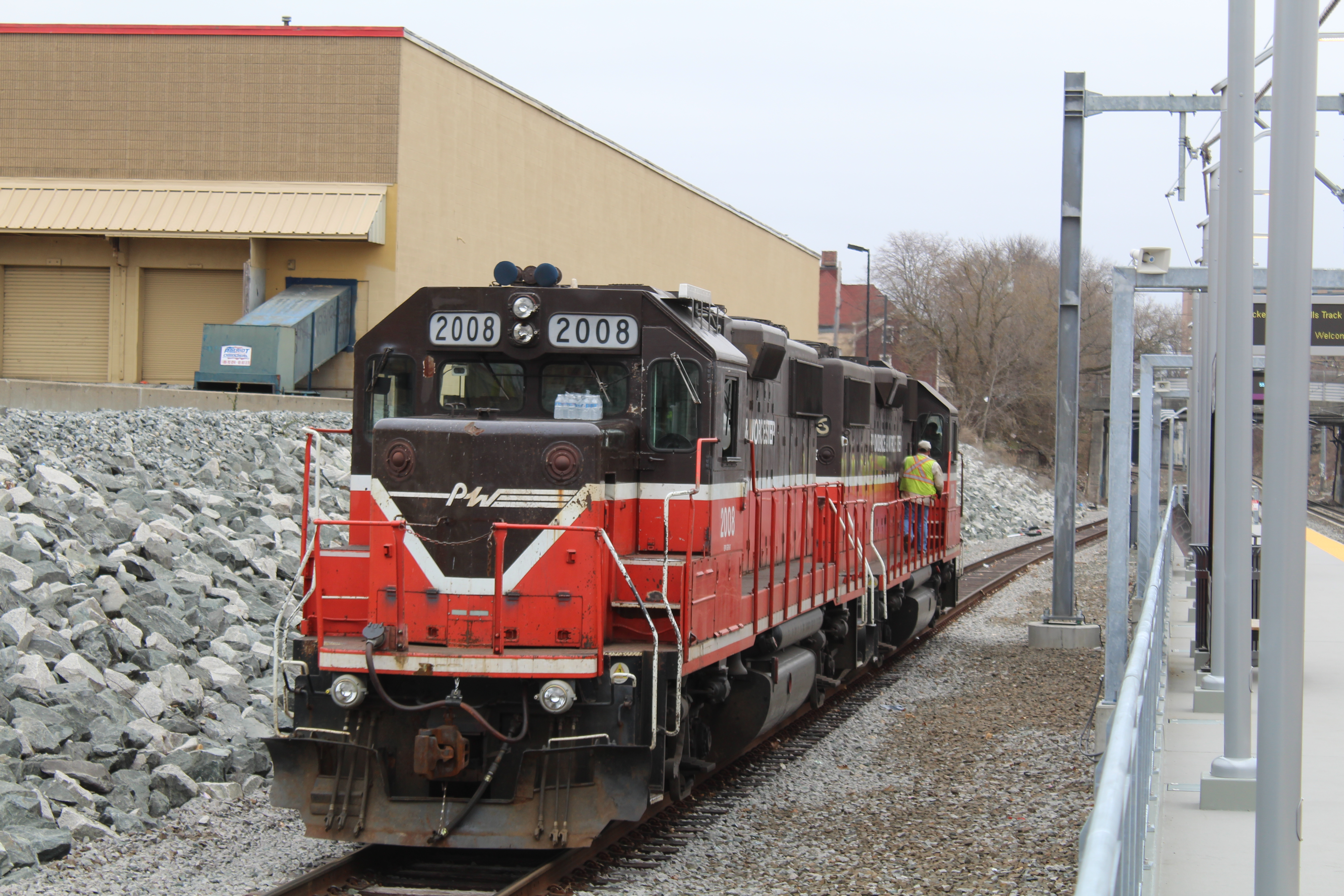
A Providence and Worcester Railroad train passing the station on the dedicated freight track

An indoor waiting room at the station for rail and bus passengers was originally planned as part of the station project; it was removed to reduce cost, then re-added with American Rescue Plan funds. RIPTA issued a request for proposals in April 2023. Construction began in September 2024. It opened in January 2026. In September 2024, Pawtucket officials proposed replacing the surface parking lots with a garage, possibly with transit oriented development above.

In March 2023, the Central Falls city solicitor reported that "[a]ll signs point toward demolition" of the former station. Earlier that year, Amtrak estimated a $9.9 million cost to demolish the structure. In August 2024, the court-appointed special master applied for a Federal Railroad Administration grant to demolish the building. The grant was not awarded.
