= Burbank (surname) =

Burbank is a surname. Notable people with the surname include:

- Albert Burbank (1902–1976), American Dixieland clarinet player
- Augustus Burbank (1823–1895), American physician
- Buzz Burbank, real name Michael J. Elston (born 1953), reporter for the Mike O'Meara Show
- Daniel C. Burbank (born 1961), American astronaut
- David Burbank (1821–1895), American dentist and real estate developer
- Elbridge Ayer Burbank (1858–1949), portrait painter of Native Americans
- Ellen Coolidge Burbank (1945–2023), American nonprofit executive, publicist
- Gary Burbank (1941–2025, Billy Purser), American radio personality
- James H. Burbank (1838–1911), Dutch soldier who fought in the American Civil War
- John A. Burbank (1827–1905), American businessman and fourth Governor of Dakota Territory
- Luke Burbank (born 1976), American podcaster and current host of Too Beautiful to Live
- Luther Burbank (1849–1926), American horticulturalist
- Nathaniel Burbank (1838–1901), American humorist, drama critic and newspaper editor
- Sidney Burbank (1807–1882), Union Army officer of the American Civil War
- Stephen B. Burbank, American professor at the University of Pennsylvania Law School

Fictional characters include:

- Carl Burbank, or Bushwacker (comics), a Marvel Comics villain
- Emil Burbank or Master Menace, a Marvel Comics villain
- Truman Burbank, main character in The Truman Show
