= Luther Burbank Middle School =

Luther Burbank Middle School can refer to:

- Luther Burbank Middle School (Burbank)
- Luther Burbank Middle School (Los Angeles)
- Luther Burbank Middle School (Massachusetts)

== See also ==
- Burbank Elementary School (disambiguation)
- Burbank High School (disambiguation)
