= Union Station (Providence) =

Providence, RI
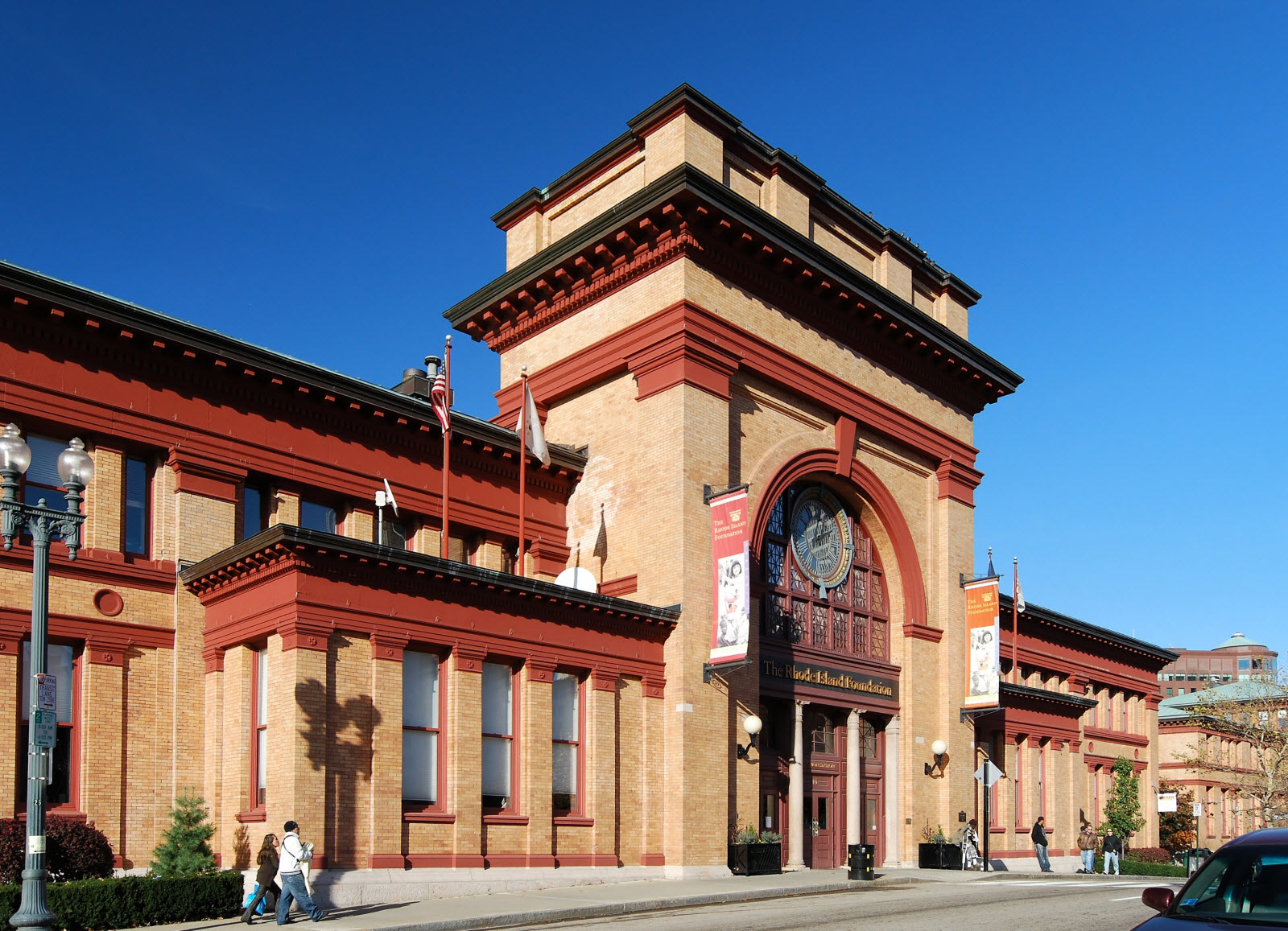
- 1898 Union Station

General information
- Location: Providence, Rhode Island; United States
- Coordinates: 41.8258°N 71.4133°W
- Owner: Amtrak
- Line: Amtrak Northeast Corridor

History
- Opened: 1847
- Closed: 1986
- Rebuilt: 1898
Former services
Preceding station	Amtrak	Following station
Kingston toward Tri-State	Hilltopper	Route 128 toward Boston South
Kingston toward Washington, D.C.	Northeast Corridor	Route 128 toward Boston South
East Greenwich toward New Haven	Beacon Hill	Route 128 toward Boston South
Preceding station	MBTA	Following station
Terminus	Providence/Stoughton Line pre-1981	Pawtucket/Central Falls toward South Station
Terminus	Foxboro event service 1971-73	Pawtucket/Central Falls toward Foxboro
Preceding station	Penn Central	Following station
Warwick toward Westerly	Westerly–Providence local 1971-1979	Terminus
Preceding station	New York, New Haven and Hartford Railroad	Following station
East Greenwich toward New Haven	Shore Line	Pawtucket-Central Falls toward Boston
Pawtucket-Central Falls toward Worcester	Providence and Worcester Railroad	Terminus
Cranston toward Hartford	New York and New England Railroad	Terminus
- Union Station
- U.S. National Register of Historic Places
- U.S. Historic district – Contributing property
- Built: 1898
- Architect: Stone, Carpenter & Willson
- Part of: Downtown Providence Historic District (ID84001967)
- NRHP reference No.: 75000003

Significant dates
- Added to NRHP: February 20, 1975
- Designated CP: February 10, 1984
Location

Union Station describes two distinct, defunct train stations in Providence, Rhode Island. Parts of the latter one were renovated and the building contains offices and restaurants.

== Union Station (1847–1887) ==
The original Union Station was Providence's first, opening in 1848 to accommodate the needs of the newly thriving city. This building was designed by 21 year old Rhode Island architect, Thomas Alexander Tefft in the Lombard Romanesque style. Construction of the station was supervised by Tallman & Bucklin. Extending 720 feet along the edge of Exchange Place, the structure was the largest railroad station in the United States the time of its construction. The building has also been dubbed longest building in the country at the time, though this assertion is disputed.

In 1885, American Architect and Building News voted the building one of the 20 best buildings in the country. 20th century architectural historian Henry-Russell Hitchcock wrote of the station, "without much question it was the finest early station in the New World."

As the city continued to grow, so too did the need for terminal space, ultimately resulting in the paving over of the remnants of the city's inland bay in 1890. The question of what to do with the now undersized station was spontaneously answered on February 21, 1896 when the building suffered a catastrophic fire that effectively gutted the structure.

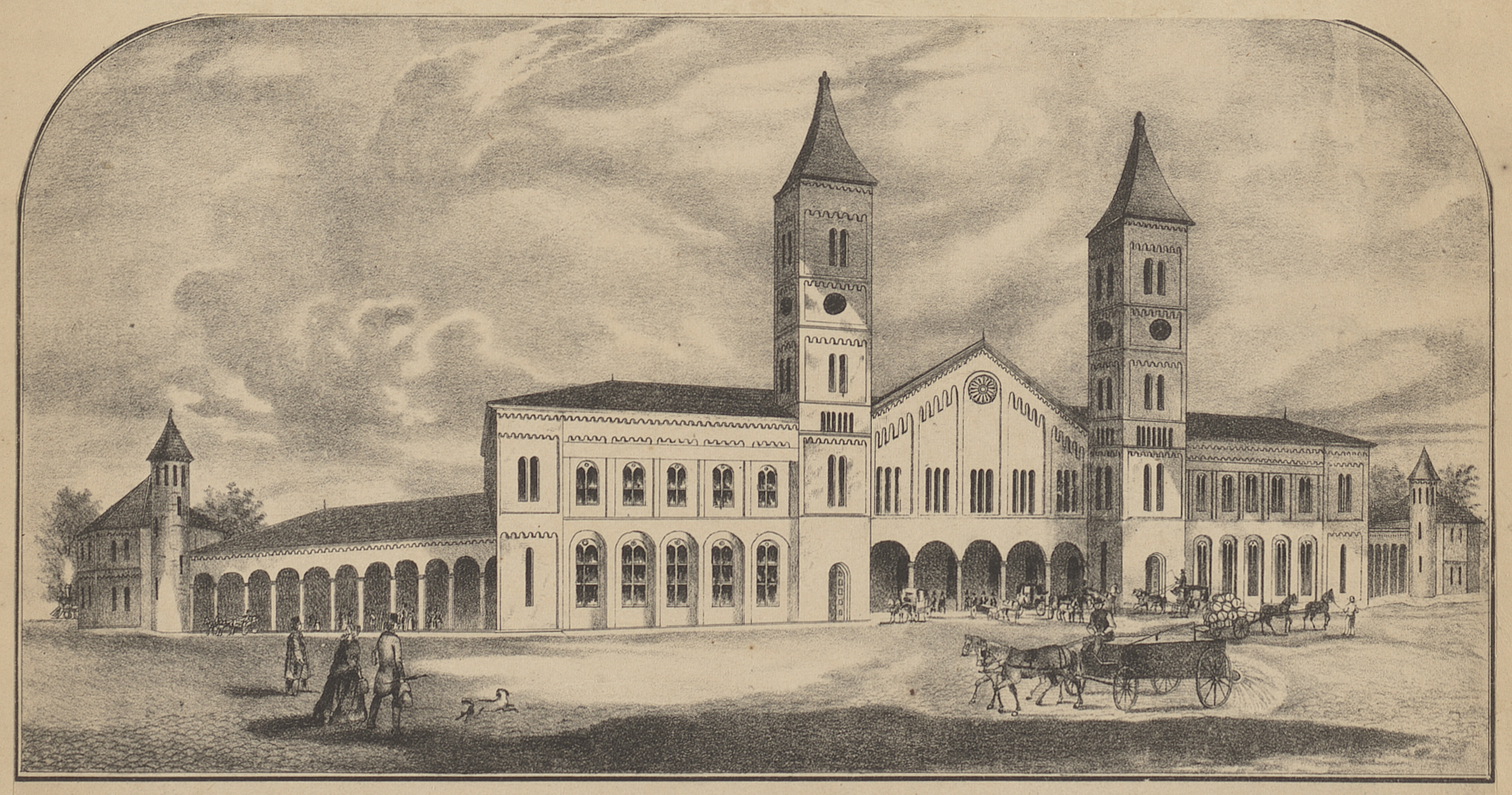
A drawing of the first Union Station in 1857, ten years after its construction

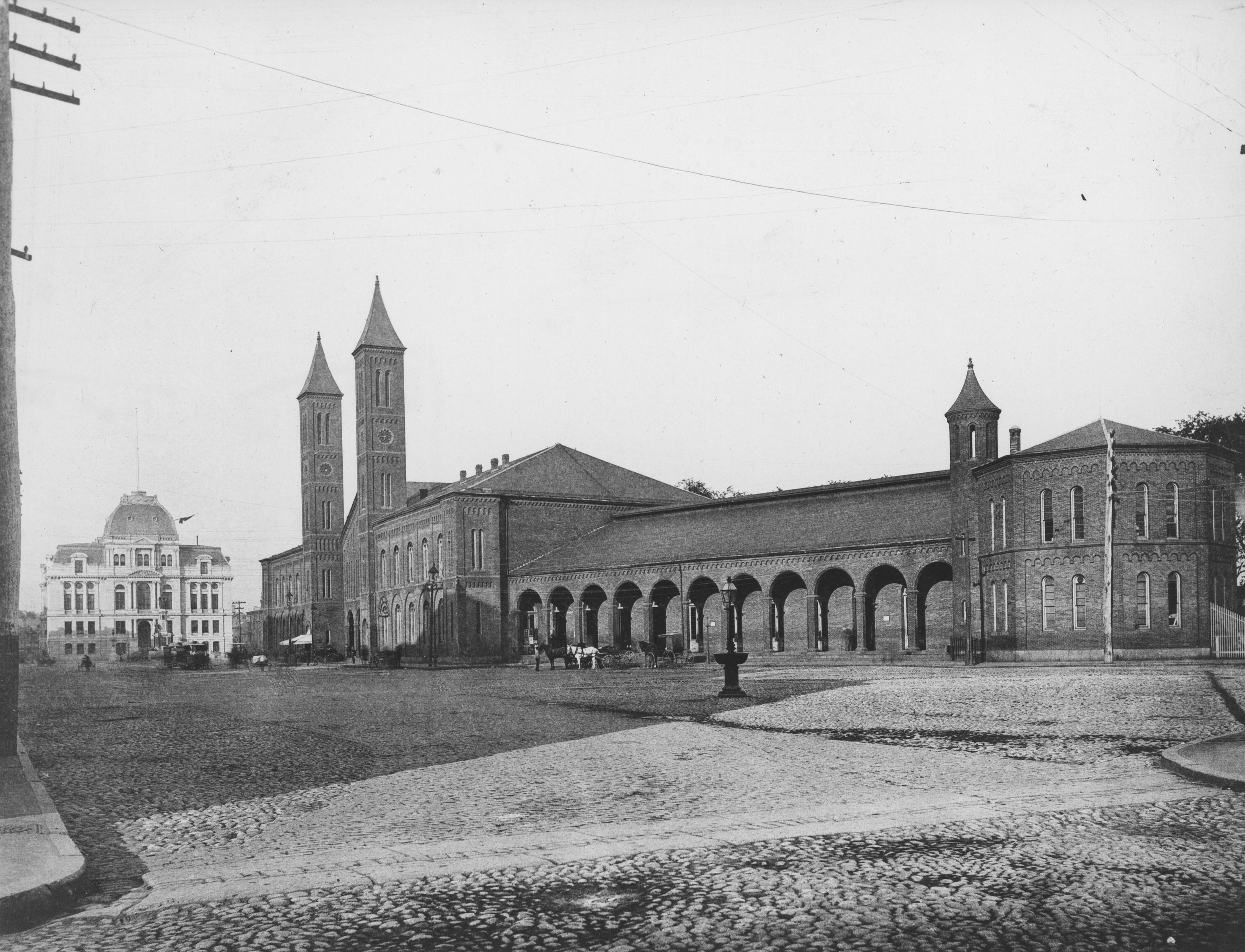
City Hall and the first Union Station in 1885

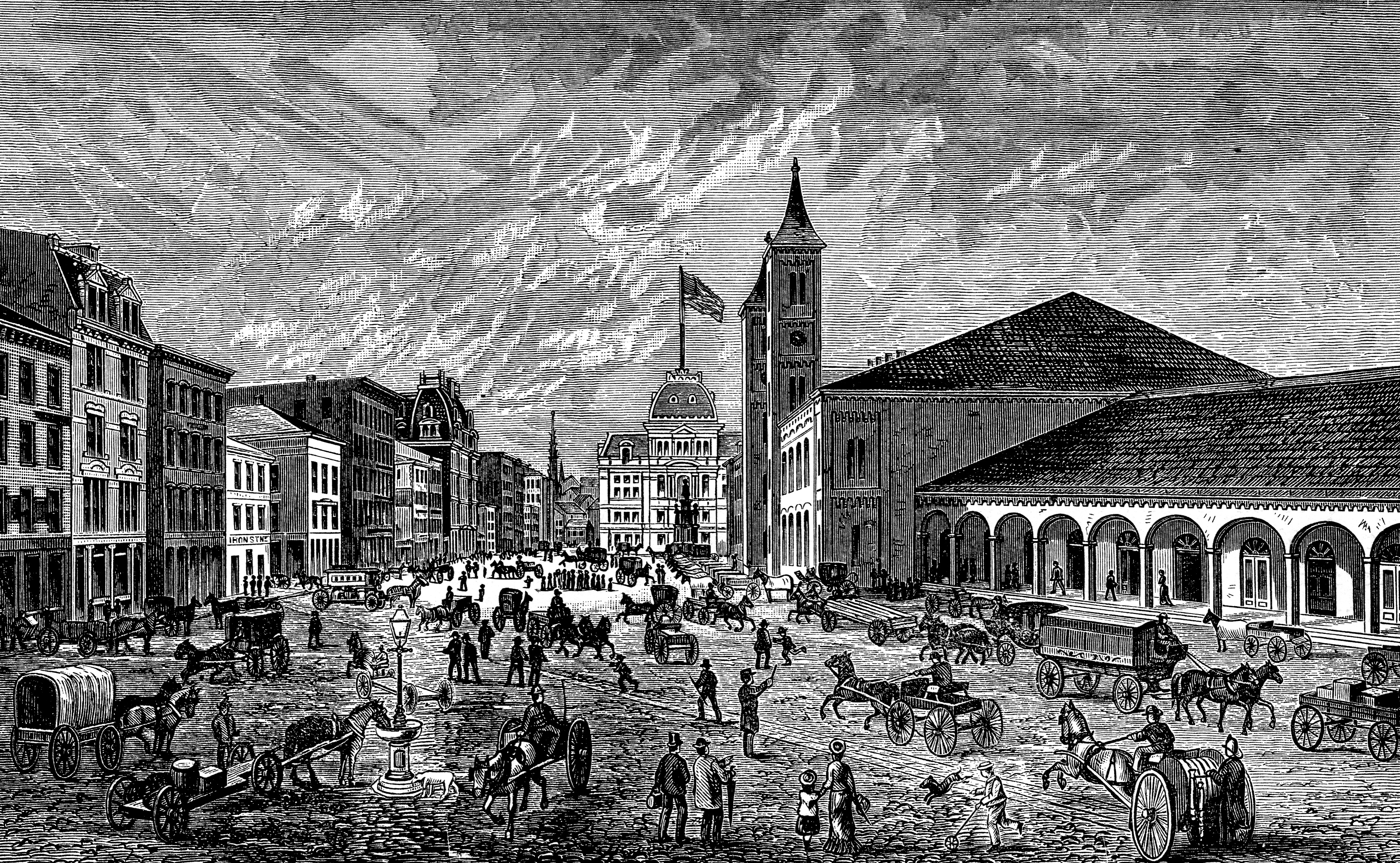
An 1886 engraving of Exchange Place. The station is visible to the right of City Hall.

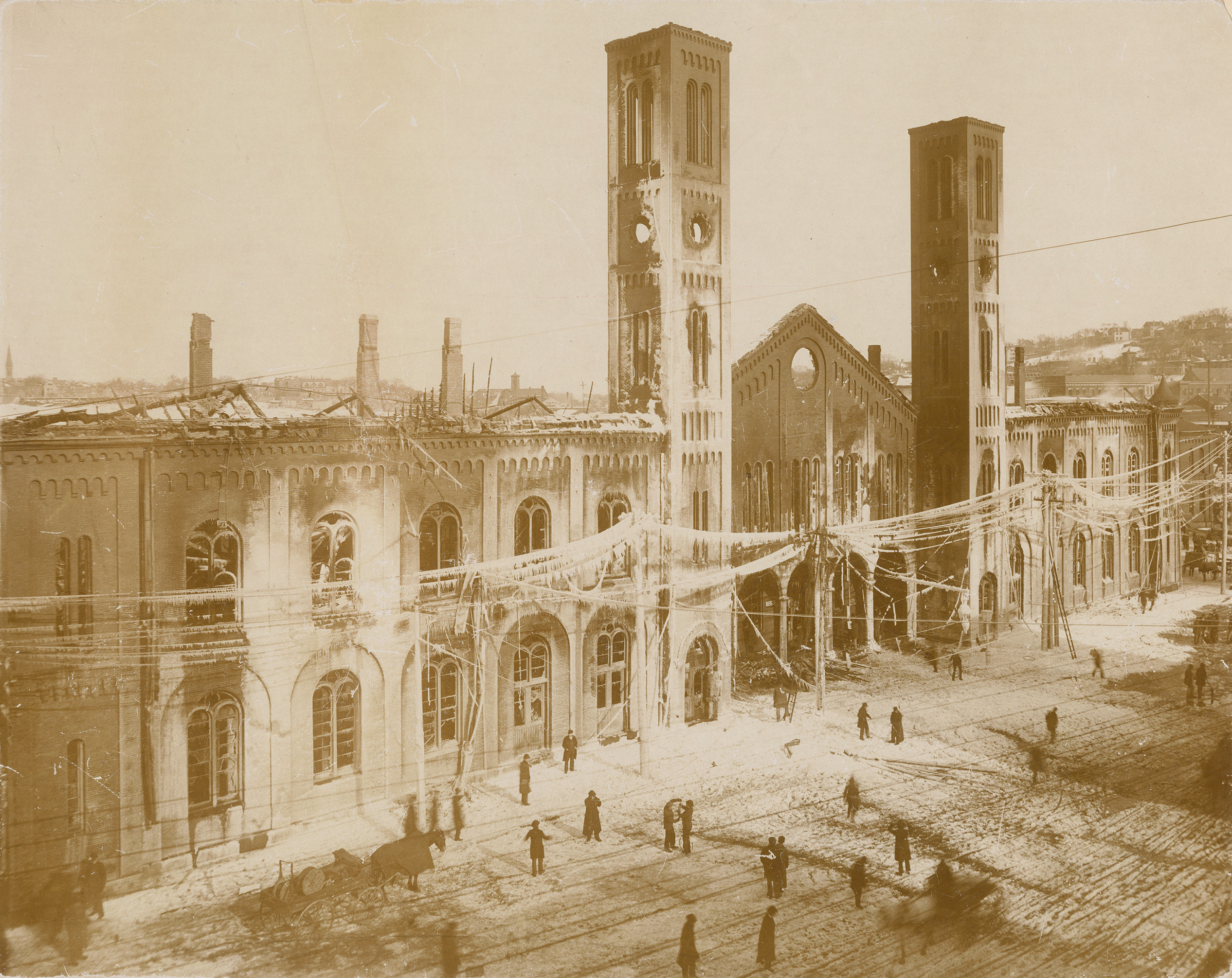
The building immediately following the 1896 fire.

== Union Station (1898–1986) ==
A much larger Union Station was opened in 1898, clad in distinctive yellow brick, which the Providence Journal heralded as "a new era of history of this city". The station was designed by the firm of Stone, Carpenter & Willson, which had also designed other Providence buildings. Though rail use grew in the early twentieth century, after the 1940’s rail traffic diminished as it did elsewhere in the U.S. By the 1980s passenger rail traffic had dropped 75 percent. City planners saw the opportunity to dismantle the "Chinese Wall" of train tracks that hemmed in Providence's central business district and moved MBTA and Amtrak service to a new, smaller Providence station about a half mile north in 1986.

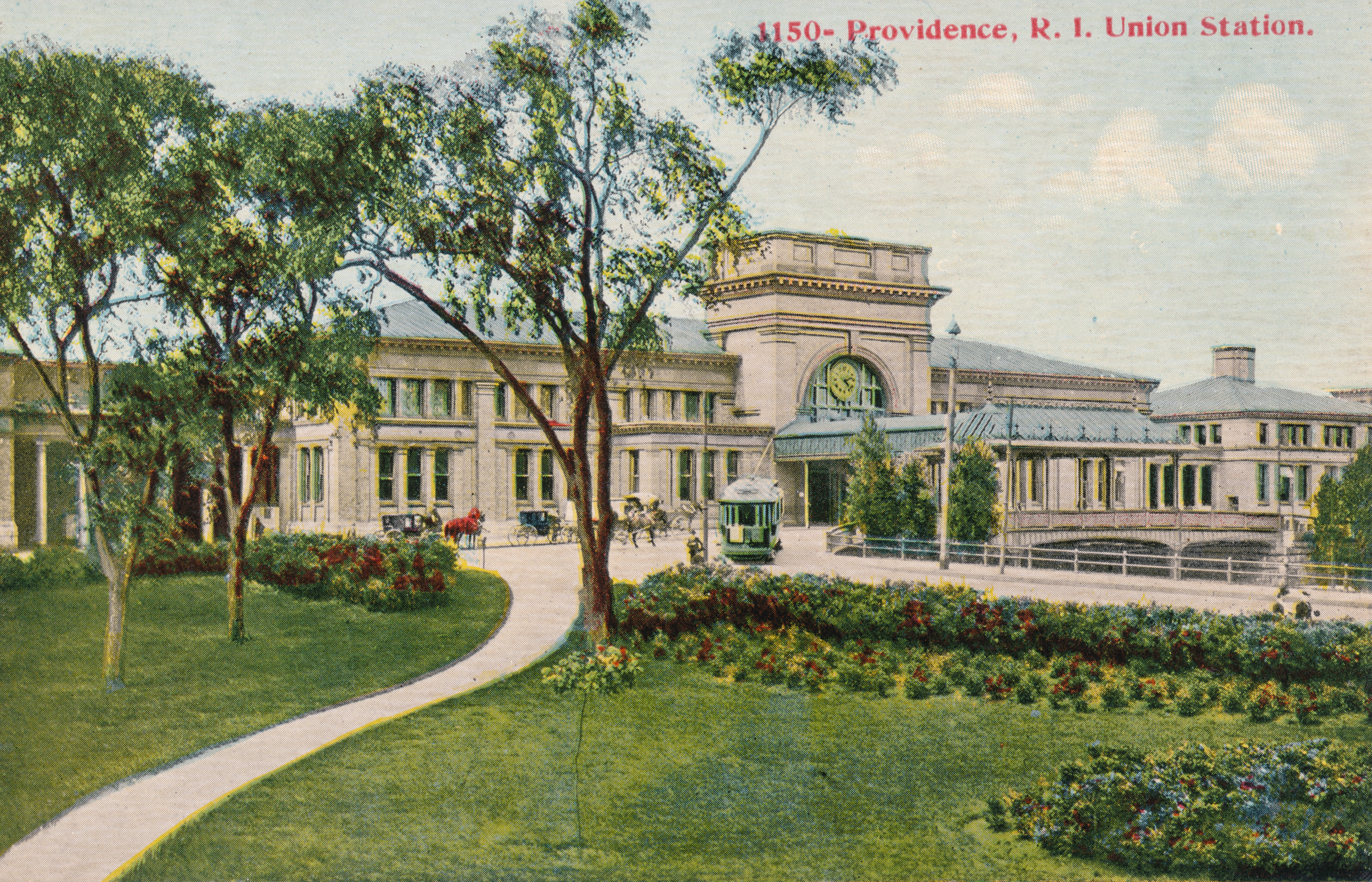
This c. 1910 postcard shows the second Union Station

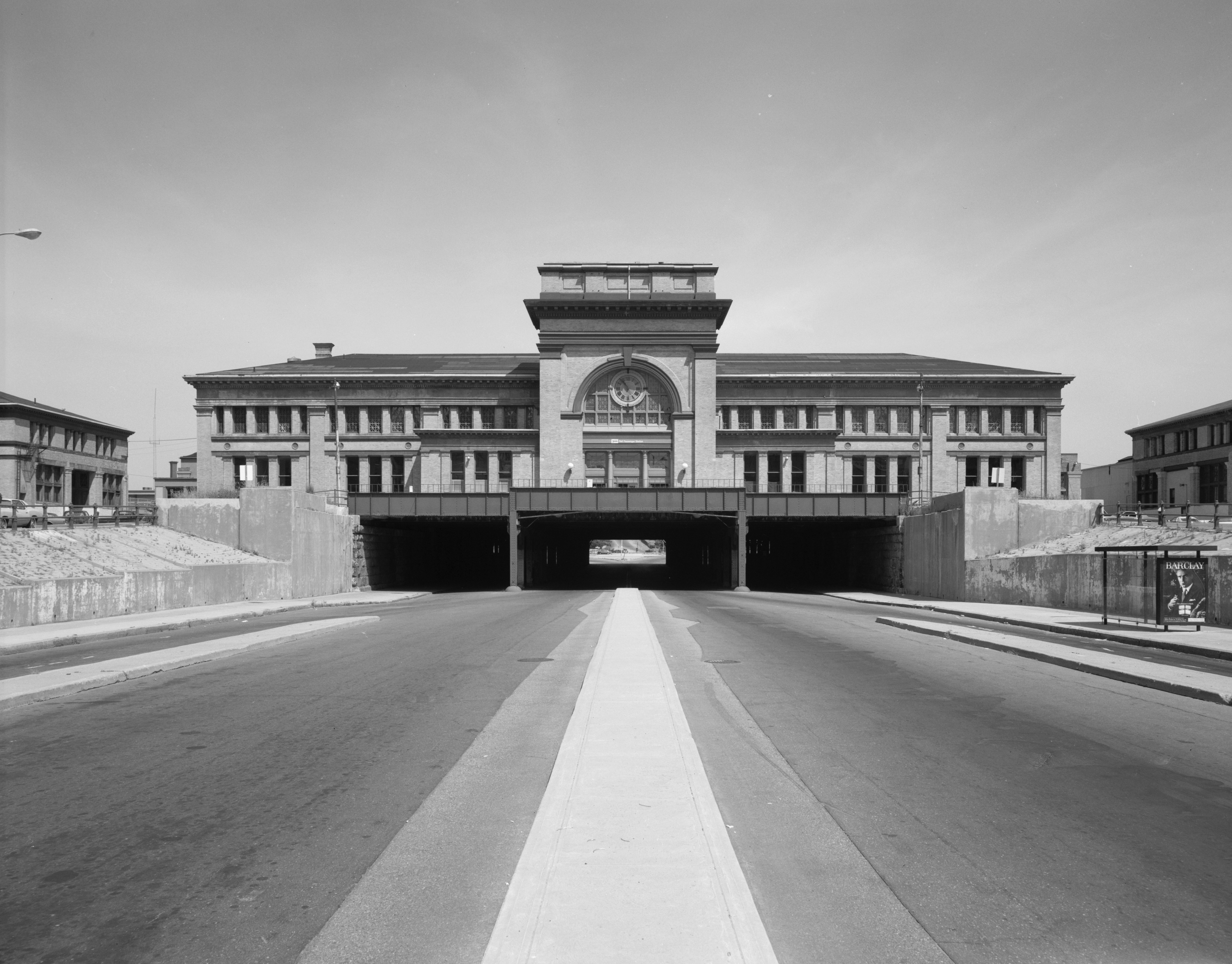
South elevation of the station in 1982

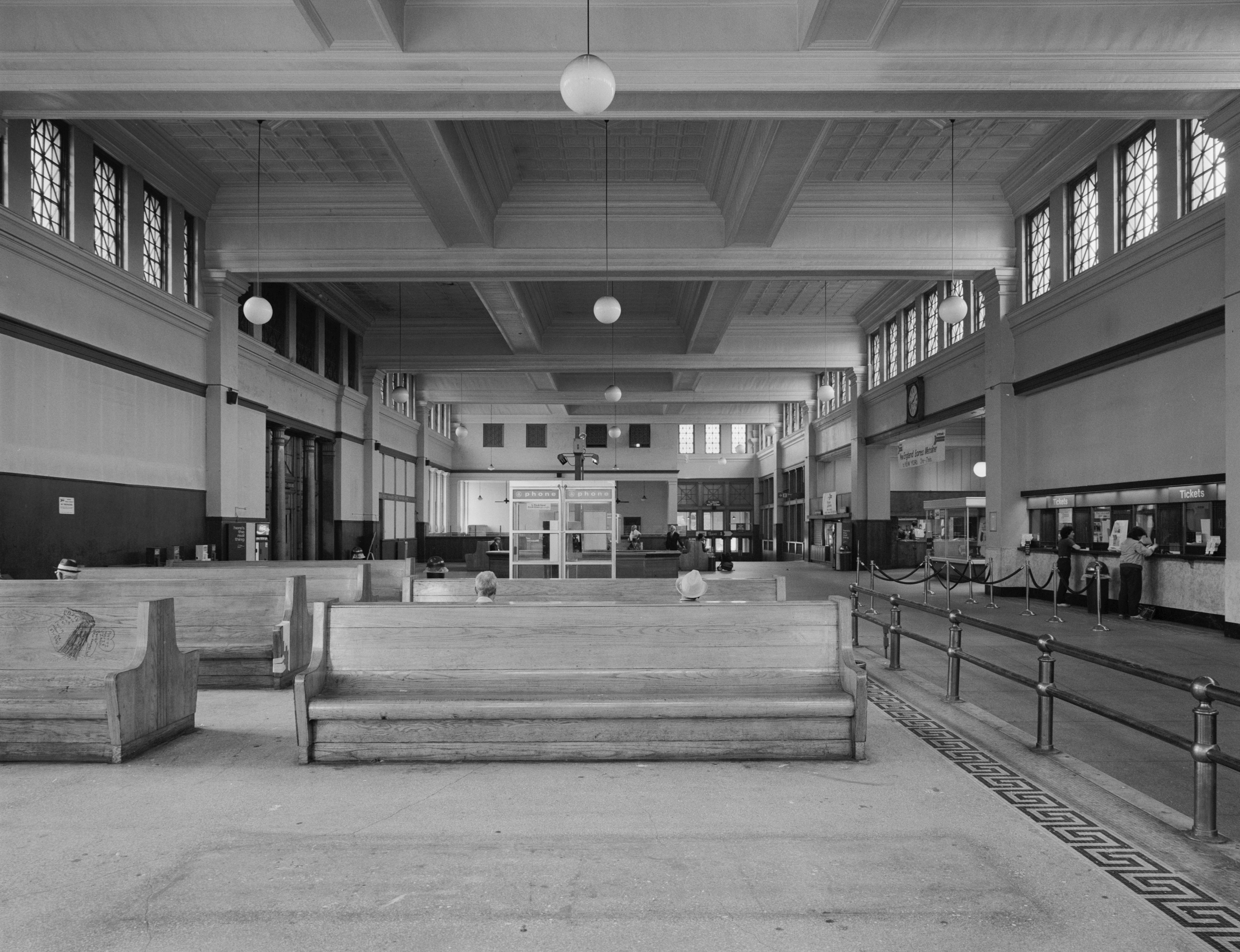
The interior of the station in 1982

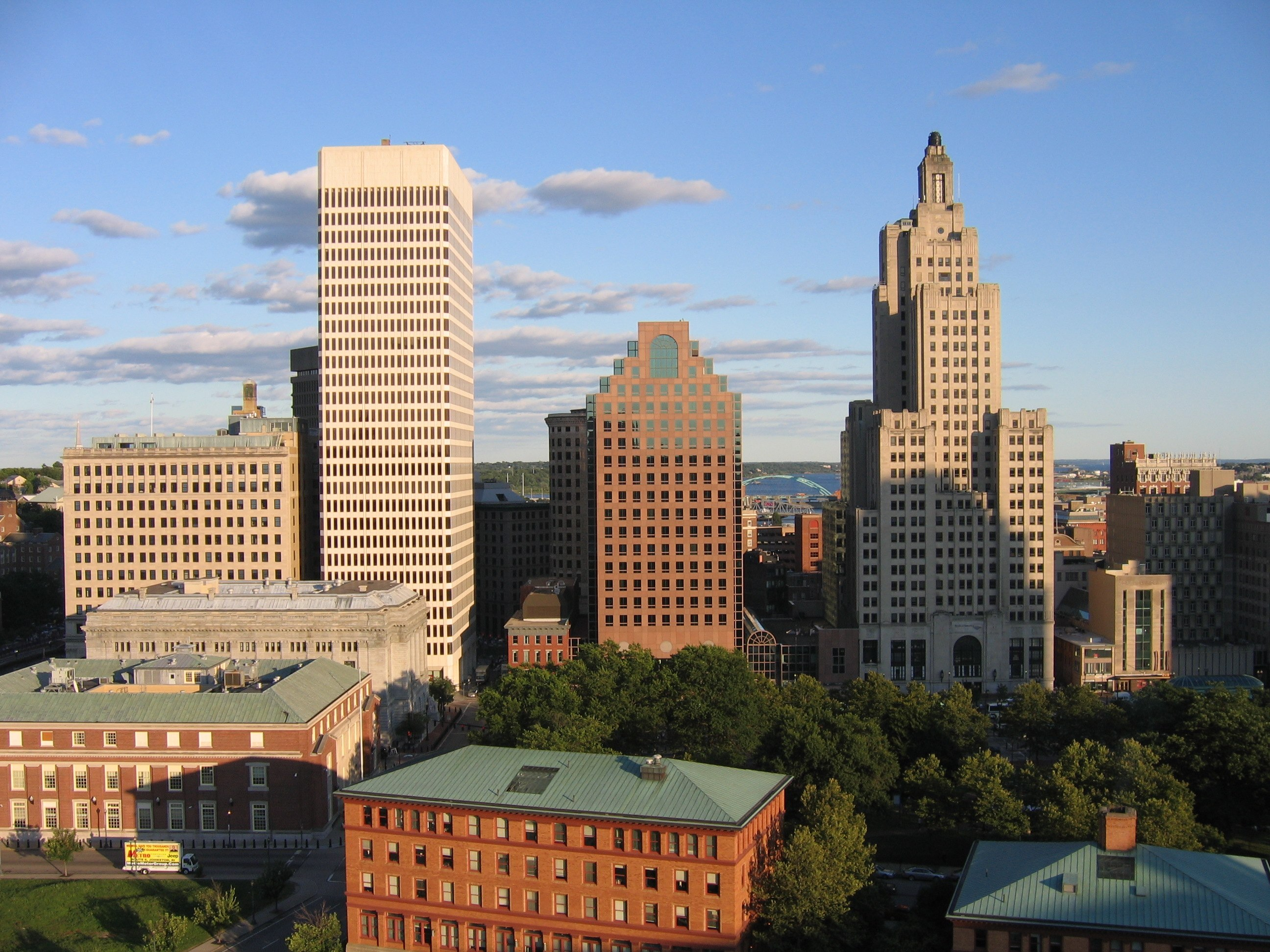
View over Kennedy Plaza. The old Union Station buildings are visible in the foreground.

== Redevelopment (1987–present) ==
Union Station caught fire in April 1987 amidst $11 million in renovations, forcing a change of plans. Parts of the original station have now been renovated and the building contains offices and restaurants, including the Union Station Brewery.

The center-most building of Union Station now houses the Rhode Island Foundation, which leases space to The Public's Radio, RI Kids Count, and Women's Fund RI.

A $23.5-million investment to develop Rhode Island's first food hall in the station was begun in 2022 by a local developer who purchased the building from The Rhode Island Foundation. The 18,000-square-foot food hall is named "Track 15", a reference to the fact that the historic Union Station had 14 tracks. It opened on March 18, 2025.
