= Ellen Coolidge Burbank =

American philanthropist (1945–2023)

- Born: Ellen Randolph Coolidge; August 4, 1945; Waltham, Massachusetts
- Died: May 15, 2023 (age 77); Philadelphia, Pennsylvania, U.S.
- Occupations: Philanthropist, museum executive
- Spouse: Stephen B. Burbank

Ellen Randolph Coolidge Burbank (1945 – 2023) was an American philanthropist, publicist, and executive in the non-profit sector. She was executive director of the Greater Philadelphia Cultural Alliance from 1976 to 1980, and later of the Pilgrim Monument and Provincetown Museum in Massachusetts from 2001 to 2011. She was a program officer for the Pew Charitable Trusts from 1987 to 2001.

== Early life and education ==
Coolidge was born in Waltham, Massachusetts, the daughter of Francis Lowell Coolidge and Helen Read Curtis Coolidge. She had a twin brother, Frank. Her father worked for the Central Intelligence Agency and the United States Postal Service, and as a child she lived in Washington, D.C., Switzerland, and Tunisia. She attended Rosemary Hall, and graduated from Finch College in 1967.

== Career ==
Burbank worked in the public relations officer at the Massachusetts Institute of Technology in the late 1960s. She moved to Philadelphia in 1975, when her husband began a long career at the University of Pennsylvania. She was Director of the Greater Philadelphia Cultural Alliance from 1976 to 1980, assistant vice president of community affairs at Philadelphia Savings Fund Society from 1980 to 1984, and was a program officer for The Pew Charitable Trusts from 1987 to 2001.

In Massachusetts later in life, Burbank was executive director of the Pilgrim Monument and Provincetown Museum from 2001 to 2011. During her tenure, the museum became a popular site for same-sex marriage ceremonies, which became legal in Massachusetts in 2004. She was a trustee of New England Village, the independent living community in Pembroke, Massachusetts, where her son was a resident. She was also a trustee of the Provincetown Art Association and Museum. She advised and consulted for organizations including the Gates Foundation, Jobs for the Future, and the Rhode Island Foundation.

== Personal life ==
Coolidge married her brother's Harvard roommate, lawyer and law professor Stephen Burbank, in 1970. They had a son, Peter, born in 1981. Her son's disabilities shaped some of her philanthropic interests and activities. She died in 2023, at the age of 77, after several years of declining health from dementia.
