= Burbank High School =

Burbank High School may refer to the following American schools:

- Burbank High School (Burbank, California), Burbank, California
- Luther Burbank High School (California), Sacramento, California
- Luther Burbank High School (Texas), San Antonio, Texas

== See also ==
- Luther Burbank Middle School (disambiguation)
- Burbank Elementary School (disambiguation)
