= Klara and the Sun (soundtrack) =

2026 film soundtrack album

Klara and the Sun (Original Motion Picture Soundtrack)

Film score by Michael Giacchino
- Released: October 23, 2026
- Recorded: 2026
- Genre: Film score
- Length: 40:38
- Labels: Sony Classical; Mutant
- Producer: Michael Giacchino

Michael Giacchino chronology
The End of Oak Street (2026)	Klara and the Sun (Original Motion Picture Soundtrack) (2026)	Ray Gunn (2026)

Klara and the Sun (Original Motion Picture Soundtrack) is the film score to the 2026 film Klara and the Sun directed by Taika Waititi based on the 2021 novel by Kazuo Ishiguro starring Jenna Ortega, Amy Adams, Mia Tharia, Aran Murphy, Steve Buscemi and Natasha Lyonne. The original score is composed by Michael Giacchino and was released through Sony Classical Records and Mutant on October 23, 2026.

== Background and release ==
In June 2026, it was announced that Michael Giacchino would score the music for Klara and the Sun renewing his association with Taika Watiti after Jojo Rabbit (2019), Thor: Love and Thunder (2022) and Next Goal Wins (2023). The original score accompanied 12 tracks and was released through Sony Classical Records and Mutant on October 23, 2026, the same day as the film.

== Reception ==
Jonathan Broxton of Movie Music UK wrote "Some listeners may find the score excessively sweet, and its reliance on one dominant theme will not satisfy anyone seeking elaborate musical architecture; personally, however, I found those qualities thoroughly endearing, and anyone who appreciates the calmer and more reflective side of Giacchino's musical personality will find it immediately appealing. With Klara and the Sun, Giacchino has created something unusually intimate, quirky, and emotionally generous; like Klara herself, the music initially seems almost too innocent for its own good, but ultimately reveals a surprisingly deep understanding of love, sacrifice, and hope. It is a lovely score, and one of Giacchino's most rewarding recent achievements of this type." Filmtracks wrote "While the composer's ultra-innocent 1950's tones do tend to annoy, they are applied very well here, and the closing two cues are lovely expressions of Giacchino drama at its best."

James Southall of Movie Wave wrote "While the score as a whole is clearly not going to be for everyone (this is perhaps the first time the composer has penned one where he could transplant the main theme onto one of his lounge albums without needing to do much rearranging) it is actually deceptively deep and carries quite a transformation from start to end (the late nine-minute "Cooting on the Fritz" is glorious) which I find very appealing." Ryan Lattanzio of IndieWire wrote "Michael Giacchino's bathetic score, layered over such a bizarrely cued pratfall, crystallizes precisely the miscalculated clash of tensions felt in every frame as the movie supposedly hurtles toward a big emotional climax." Kristy Puchko of Mashable India wrote "the score by Michael Giacchino is cloyingly sentimental, desperately flagging to the audience a scene is meant to be moving when even on the page it must have been flat."

David Rooney of The Hollywood Reporter wrote "the opening strains of Michael Giacchino's score [...] have us bracing for an overload of saccharine whimsy". Laura Miller of Slate called it a "saccharine score". Tim Grierson of Los Angeles Times wrote "Michael Giacchino's aggressively precious score makes its first appearance, practically serving as a warning for what's to come. The syrupy strings, treacly piano and awed choral vocals conjure an atmosphere of strained enchantment". Patrick Cremona of Radio Times called "the score by Michael Giacchino is asked to do a lot of heavy lifting."

== Track listing ==
No.	Title	Length
1.	"Klara's Theme"	2:42
2.	"Everything's on Klarance"	1:16
3.	"The Cooting Monster"	2:00
4.	"She's Perfect"	2:21
5.	"Calibreading the World"	2:00
6.	"Barnstorming"	1:18
7.	"Finding Scarecrow in a Haystack"	4:36
8.	"The Hook of Henry"	1:13
9.	"Castlemania"	7:50
10.	"Not Afraid Anymore"	2:10
11.	"Cooting on the Fritz"	8:58
12.	"Klara and the Scroll"	4:14
Total length:		40:38

== Personnel ==
Credits adapted from Film Music Reporter:

- Music composer and producer: Michael Giacchino
- Music supervisor: Kirsten Lane
- Music editors: Stephen M. Davis, Tom Jenkins, Poppy Kavanagh, Peter Clarke
- Orchestrator: Jeff Kryka
- Conductor: Cliff Masterson
- Recording and mixing: Peter Cobbin, Kirsty Whalley
- Digital score recordist: Daniel Hayden
- Orchestra contractors: Isobel Griffiths, Amy Stewart
- Orchestra leaders: John Mills, Jeremy Isaac
- Piano solist: David Arch
- Harp soloist: Skalla Kanga
- Cello soloist: Caroline Dale
- French horn soloist: Martin Owen
- Choirmaster: Ben Parry
- Choir: London Voices
- Solo vocalist: Sara Davey
- Music preparation: Jill Streater, Ann Barnard, Leo Nicholson, Ian Hayter, Tim Seddon, Rob Sneddon, Giles Thornton
- Score editors: Dimitra Christofidou, Oliver Howlett
- Score coordinators: Jordan Paris Hatab, Logyn Okuda
