= Spider-Man: Brand New Day (soundtrack) =

Spider-Man: Brand New Day (Original Motion Picture Soundtrack)

Film score by Michael Giacchino
- Released: July 31, 2026
- Genre: Film score
- Length: 77:38
- Label: Sony Classical

Michael Giacchino chronology
| Zootopia 2 (2025) | Spider-Man: Brand New Day (Original Motion Picture Soundtrack) (2026) | The End of Oak Street (2026) |

Singles from Spider-Man: Brand New Day
- 1. "Suite New Day" Released: July 16, 2026

Spider-Man: Brand New Day (Original Motion Picture Soundtrack) is the film score to the Columbia Pictures / Marvel Studios film Spider-Man: Brand New Day composed by Michael Giacchino. The soundtrack album was released by Sony Classical on July 31, 2026.

== Background ==
Michael Giacchino was confirmed in December 2025 to be returning as composer from the previous MCU Spider-Man films. Giacchino stated that he intentionally removed specific musical notes from the MCU Spider-Man theme for the score of Brand New Day to represent "pulling away all the pieces of [Peter's] life that he doesn't have anymore".

The Japanese dubbed version of the film features the song "Brand New" by Mrs. Green Apple over its end credits; Feige is a fan of the band and contacted them to be involved with the film. Other licensed songs featured in the film include "Wolf Like Me" by TV on the Radio, "Dame Tu Amistad" by Dominique Patrick Noel, Hector Luis Pagan, Eduardo Padua, and Eddie Montalvo, "I'm Every Woman" by Chaka Khan, "Loser" by Tame Impala, "Fire for You" by Cannons, "Eoo" by Bad Bunny, "St. Elmo's Fire" by Brian Eno, "Oh Yeah?" by Steve Lacy, and "Monopoly" by Monetochka.

"Monopoly" was cut from the Ukrainian and Russian dubs, the former following complaints by activists against the addition of "a Russian singer" owing to the Russo-Ukrainian war, and the latter due to Monetochka's songs being banned in Russia after she was designated a "foreign agent" by the Russian government.

== Track listing ==
All music is composed by Michael Giacchino.

| No. | Title | Length |
|---|---|---|
| 1. | "Web Letter Days" | 2:39 |
| 2. | "A Good Day to Dive" | 4:11 |
| 3. | "Possession is Nine-Tenths of the Brawl" | 3:49 |
| 4. | "What's Your Damage Control" | 0:40 |
| 5. | "The Metzger Set" | 1:38 |
| 6. | "Ned Man Walking" | 1:10 |
| 7. | "Quick as a Flashback" | 3:18 |
| 8. | "Peter's Walk of Shame" | 2:12 |
| 9. | "Settling Old Scorpions" | 3:53 |
| 10. | "Strong First Expressions" | 0:57 |
| 11. | "The Speed of Thought" | 5:00 |
| 12. | "Come Fly With Me" | 0:31 |
| 13. | "Kiss of the Spider-Man" | 4:59 |
| 14. | "Always Hulking About" | 3:47 |
| 15. | "Damage Control to Major Bomb" | 6:14 |
| 16. | "The Morning Aftermath" | 1:42 |
| 17. | "Mask Me No More Questions" | 2:12 |
| 18. | "Big Sister Energy" | 2:58 |
| 19. | "A Brave Neural World" | 2:28 |
| 20. | "To the V-Max" | 2:10 |
| 21. | "Fight the Hand That Bleeds You" | 2:55 |
| 22. | "I Spider with My Little Eye" | 3:47 |
| 23. | "Mi Cabeza, Su Cabeza" | 4:26 |
| 24. | "Say Hero to My Little Friend" | 2:37 |
| 25. | "Better Off Ned" | 0:55 |
| 26. | "Suite New Day" | 6:15 |
| Total length: | | 77:38 |

== Reception ==
Christian Clemmensen of Filmtracks awarded the score four stars, dubbing it "a mature and introspective examination of its predecessors" and applauded the "admirable" concept of "a "sad" superhero score". Despite his reservations regarding Giacchino's "unsatisfying" thematic handling and the "decent but not great" action material, he stated that "there's enough tender substance here to recommend this entry".

== Charts ==
Chart performance for Spider-Man: Brand New Day (Original Motion Picture Soundtrack)
| Chart (2026) | Peak position |
|---|---|
| Australian Classical Albums (ARIA) | 1 |
| Australian Classical/Crossover Albums (ARIA) | 1 |
| Belgian Albums (Ultratop Flanders) | 96 |
| French Physical Albums (SNEP) | 87 |
| UK Album Downloads (Official Charts) | 40 |
| UK Classical Albums (Official Charts) | 2 |
| UK Soundtrack Albums (Official Charts) | 4 |
