= Luther Burbank Elementary School (Detroit) =

- U.S. National Register of Historic Places
- Interactive map
- Location: 15600 East State Fair Ave. Detroit, Michigan
- Coordinates: 42°26′33″N 82°57′34″W
- Built: 1931
- Architect: Van Leyen, Schilling & Keough; Corrado Parducci
- Architectural style: Art Deco
- MPS: Public Schools of Detroit MPS
- NRHP reference No.: 100007521
- Added to NRHP: March 15, 2022

The Luther Burbank Elementary School (or just the Burbank School,) is a former school building located at 15600 East State Fair Avenue in Detroit, Michigan. The building was listed on the National Register of Historic Places in 2022. The school in a notable example of a Detroit Art Deco Public School.

== History ==
The east side neighborhoods of Detroit near this school were quickly developed in the late 1920s. In response, an elementary school was established in a temporary structure in 1930. The school board engaged the firm of Van Leyen, Schilling & Keough to design a permanent building, which was opened in 1931. The completed structure was named in honor of horticulturalist Luther Burbank. The surrounding neighborhood continued to grow, with the school serving 379 students from kindergarten to eighth grade by 1938. In response, the school expanded, first into temporary buildings, and then, in 1944, into a single-story addition connected to the main school. A second story was added in 1946, and a further addition containing a gymnasium in 1949.

In 1961, the school was designated a junior high, serving students in grades six through nine. It continued as such through the rest of the century. In 1992, a final addition was made to the rear of the school; unusual in that this addition was made during a time when the Detroit Public Schools were suffering from declining enrollment. In 2001, the name of the school was changed to Dorothy Fisher Magnet School, and the next year the Heilmann middle school was built next door. The Burbank School was closed in 2009.

== Description ==
The Burbank School is a two-story U-shaped Art Deco school building. It sits on a concrete foundation, and has a flat roof. The walls are constructed of multi-shaded brown brick, laid in a decorative pattern. The walls are detailed with light gray limestone. The bays are divided using vertical piers constructed of molded and rounded brick capped with terra cotta shaped in stylized Art Deco motifs. Bays contain regularly arranged window openings containing original multi-light steel-framed windows. Both of the principal facades contain projecting central entrance bays with the name "BURBANK SCHOOL" above the door opening. Below this name panel and to its sides are sculpted elements by Corrado Parducci, consisting of a small owl flanked by stylized Art Deco floral patterns and griffin at each end.
