= Stephen B. Burbank =

American legal scholar

- Title: David Berger Professor for the Administration of Justice
- Spouse: Ellen Coolidge Burbank

Academic work
- Institutions: University of Pennsylvania Law School

Stephen B. Burbank is the David Berger Professor for the Administration of Justice Emeritus at the University of Pennsylvania Law School.

== Education ==
In 1964, Burbank graduated cum laude from the Phillips Academy in Andover, Massachusetts, where he graduated as valedictorian.

In 1968, Burbank graduated summa cum laude with an A.B. from Harvard College, where he was elected to Phi Beta Kappa and was awarded the Harvard College Honorary Scholarship, the John Harvard Scholarship, the Detur Prize, the Curtis Prize, and the Sheldon Fellowship. In 1970–71, he spent the year in Europe on the Sheldon Fellowship.

In 1973, he graduated magna cum laude from Harvard Law School, where he was awarded the Fay Diploma for graduating first in his class. He also received the Newbold Rhinelander Landon Memorial Fellowship and the Joseph H. Beale Prize.

== Professional career ==
Burbank was a law clerk to Justice Robert Braucher of the Massachusetts Supreme Judicial Court in 1973-1974 and then to Chief Justice of the United States, Warren Burger, in 1974–1975.

He was general counsel of the University of Pennsylvania from 1975 to 1980, joining the professorial ranks of Penn Law in 1979.

One of the most influential scholars of federal practice and procedure, Burbank is the author of definitive works on federal court rule-making, inter-jurisdictional preclusion, litigation sanctions, and judicial independence and accountability. He is also an authority on international civil litigation and has lectured and taught widely in Europe. He has served as a reporter of judicial discipline rules for the Third Circuit and of that circuit's task force to study Rule 11, has been invited to testify before congressional committees on numerous occasions and was appointed by the Speaker of the U.S. House of Representatives to serve as a member of the National Commission on Judicial Discipline and Removal (1991–1993).

Burbank served for a decade on the executive committee of the American Judicature Society and chaired the Fellowship Selection Committee of the American Academy in Berlin, of which he is now a trustee.

In November 2002, a federal court appointed Burbank special master of the National Football League, until 2011 when he became the league's system arbitrator, a role he has held since. In that role, he resolves certain categories of disputes between the NFL Players Association and the NFL Management Council under a consent decree and collective bargaining agreement.

Burbank has been a visiting professor at Harvard; Urbino, Italy; Pavia, Italy; Goethe University, Frankfurt, Germany; and the University of Michigan.

== Books ==
- Rule 11 in Transition: The Report of the Third Circuit Task Force on Federal Rule of Civil Procedure 11 (1989) This multi-method empirical study of the operation of the most controversial procedural rule of the 1980s, cited on numerous occasions by the Supreme Court, was instrumental in bringing about changes in court practices and the rule itself.
- Report of the National Commission on Judicial Discipline and Removal (with others, 1993)
- Judicial Independence at the Crossroads: An Interdisciplinary Approach (with B. Friedman, 2002)

== See also ==
- List of law clerks for the chief justice of the United States
