= Rhode Island Foundation =

Community foundation in Rhode Island

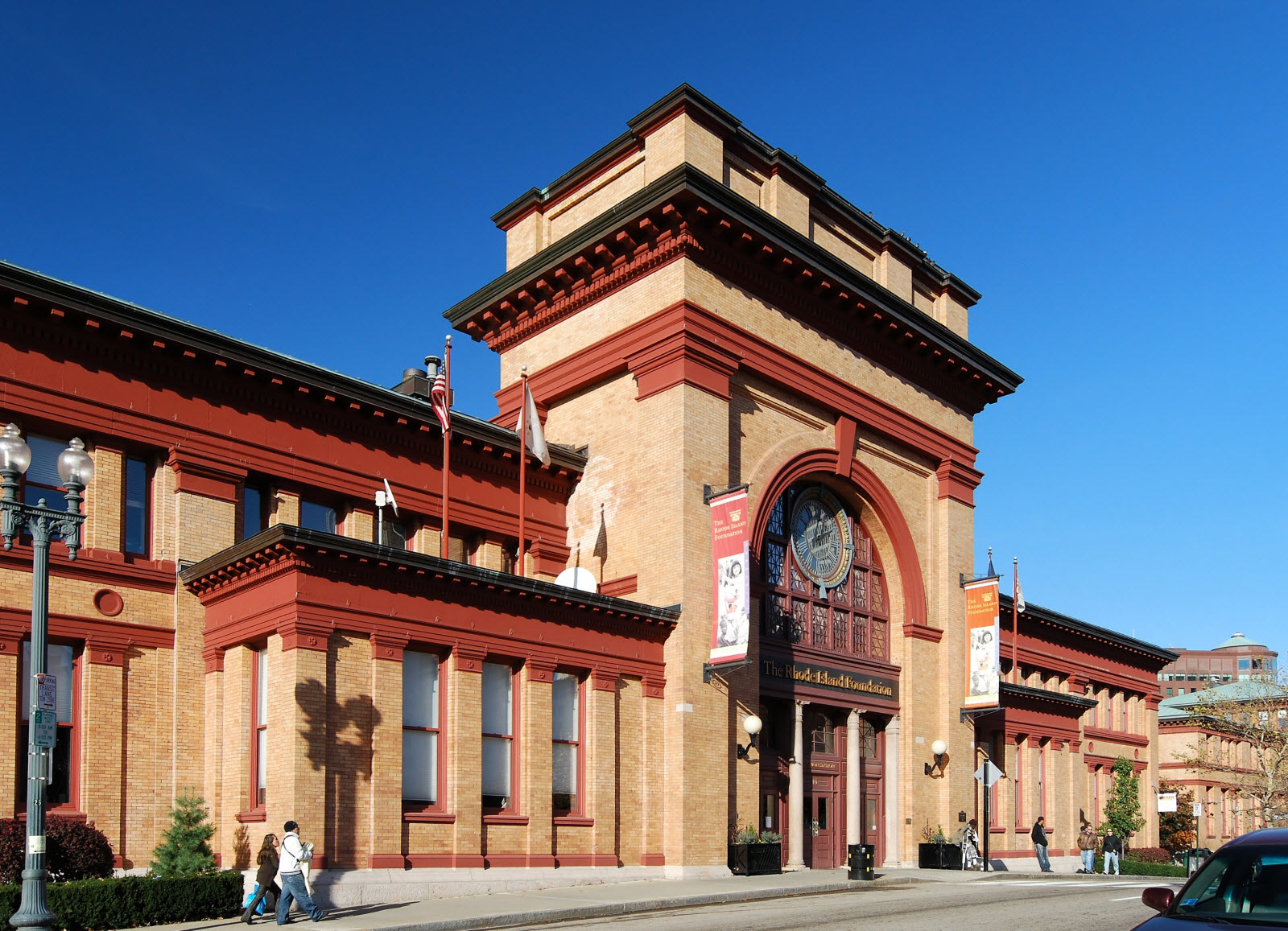
- Headquarters in Providence
- Founded: June 13, 1916
- Founder: Group of Rhode Island civic leaders; Rhode Island Hospital Trust Bank
- Type: Community foundation
- Purpose: Philanthropy; grantmaking; community investment; capacity building
- Location: One Union Station, Providence, RI 02903
- CEO: David Cicilline
- Website: rifoundation.org

The Rhode Island Foundation is a 501(c)(3) community foundation based in Providence, Rhode Island. Established in 1916, it is the state’s only community foundation and one of the oldest such institutions in the United States. The foundation manages charitable endowments, administers grants and scholarships, and partners with donors, civic leaders, and nonprofit organizations to address statewide needs and long‑term community priorities.

== History ==
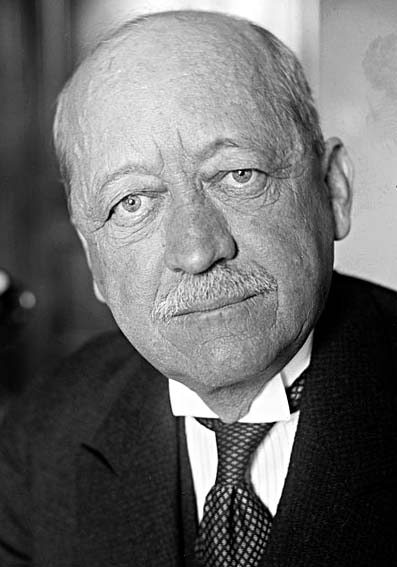
Founding donor Jesse H. Metcalf

The foundation was established on June 13, 1916, after a group of Rhode Island civic leaders asked the Rhode Island Hospital Trust Bank to help create a permanent philanthropic institution modeled on the Cleveland Foundation. Its first contribution was "a relatively modest gift of $10,000 from industrialist Jesse H. Metcalf. "

A volunteer distribution committee oversaw the fund and deferred grantmaking until 1922, when the foundation issued its first awards, including a $25 grant to the American Red Cross and a $10 grant to the Providence YMCA.

The passage of the Tax Reform Act of 1969 increased the attractiveness of community foundations relative to private foundations, accelerating the foundation’s growth. During the 1970s, it absorbed the Hope Charitable Foundation’s $4.9 million in assets and hired its first executive director, John E. Marshall III. By 1977, assets reached $20 million and annual grants exceeded $1 million.

In 1984, the foundation created a parallel entity, the Rhode Island Community Foundation, enabling diversified investment management and acceptance of donor‑advised funds.

The foundation marked its 100th anniversary in 2016. A centennial editorial noted that "for 100 years, the Rhode Island Foundation has invested in the betterment of the Ocean State. " Centennial activities included a statewide community grant program and a $10 million campaign to restore Roger Williams Park.

== Operations and programs ==
The foundation is headquartered at One Union Station in downtown Providence. The foundation manages more than 1,000 permanent and donor‑advised funds, including unrestricted funds, designated funds, field‑of‑interest funds, and scholarship funds. These funds reflect a wide range of donor priorities and community needs.

The foundation distributes grants to nonprofit organizations across Rhode Island, supporting areas such as health care, housing, education, the environment, arts and culture, and economic mobility. The foundation administers hundreds of scholarship funds guided by donor intent. Scholarships may support general educational assistance or target specific fields of study, geographic areas, or student backgrounds. The foundation supports statewide initiatives such as the Equity Leadership Initiative, which develops leaders of color, and sector‑support programs for nonprofit capacity building.

In 2025, the foundation distributed a record $93 million in grants to more than 2,600 organizations statewide. in July 2025, the foundation awarded $6.1 million in grants to 147 organizations through its Community Priority and Capacity Building program. Approximately $2 million supported nonprofits that had recently lost federal funding. President and CEO David Cicilline noted that federal budget cuts were "making the work that these nonprofit organizations do even more challenging. "

== Leadership ==
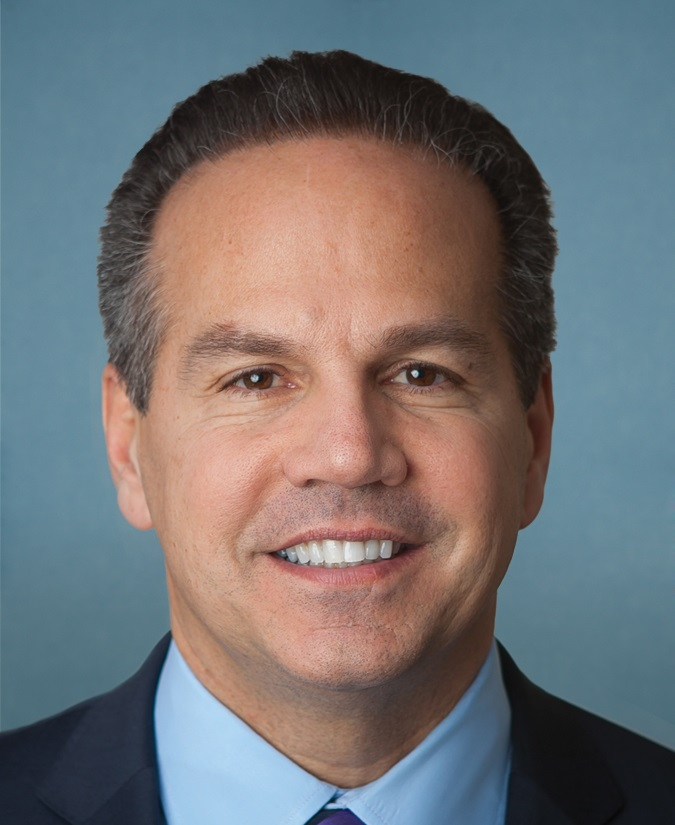
David Cicilline

The foundation is governed by a board of directors and advised by an external investment committee. Former U.S. Representative David Cicilline serves as president and chief executive officer.

Executive Officers
| Name | Title | Years |
|---|---|---|
| John E. Marshall III | Executive Director | 1975–1979 |
| Doug Jansson | Executive Director | 1979–1993 |
| Ronald Gallo | President and CEO | 1993–2007 |
| George Graboys | Acting President | 2007–2008 |
| Neil D. Steinberg | President and CEO | 2008–2023 |
| David N. Cicilline | President and CEO | 2023–present |

== Five‑year action plan (2024–2029) ==
In December 2024, the foundation launched a five‑year action plan through its Community Priority and Capacity Building program. The plan organizes discretionary grantmaking around six statewide priorities:

1. Advancing diversity, equity, inclusion, and accessibility
2. Expanding civic and cultural opportunities
3. Reducing the effects of climate change
4. Improving education and strengthening student and educator support
5. Lowering barriers to affordable housing and generational wealth
6. Expanding equitable access to quality health care

== See also ==
- Philanthropy in the United States
- Community foundation
- Providence, Rhode Island
