= Rhode Island Public Transit Authority =

Public transport agency in Rhode Island, US

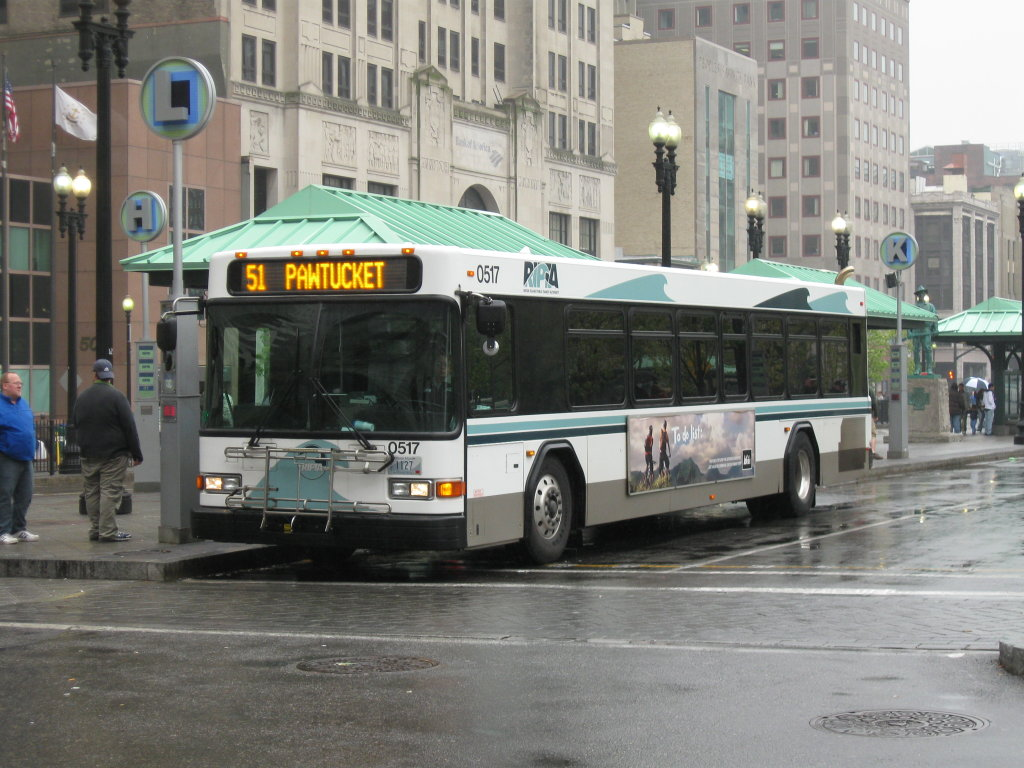
- A route 51 bus at Kennedy Plaza in 2008
- Founded: 1966
- Headquarters: 705 Elmwood Avenue; Providence, Rhode Island united states
- Locale: Rhode Island (statewide)
- Service type: transit bus, paratransit, demand responsive transport
- Routes: 59 fixed-route 7 demand-response
- Hubs: 3 (Kennedy Plaza, Newport Gateway Center, Pawtucket/Central Falls station)
- Lounge: 3 (one at each hub)
- Fleet: 229 buses, 13 vans, 72 paratransit vans
- Daily ridership: 38,700 (weekdays, Q1 2026)
- Annual ridership: 12,529,300 (2025)
- Fuel type: Diesel, Diesel-electric, CNG, Battery-electric
- Chief executive: Christopher Durand
- Website: www.ripta.com

The Rhode Island Public Transit Authority (RIPTA) provides public transportation, primarily buses, in the U.S. state of Rhode Island. The main hub of the RIPTA system is Kennedy Plaza, a large bus terminal in downtown Providence, Rhode Island. Average daily ridership as of the first quarter of 2026 is 38,700. The agency operates 59 fixed-route bus routes and 7 demand-responsive routes, together serving 37 out of 39 Rhode Island municipalities.

== Service ==
The agency operates 59 fixed-route bus routes and 7 demand-responsive routes, together serving 37 out of 39 Rhode Island municipalities. Paratransit service is branded RIde with a service area corresponding to that of non-express bus routes. RIPTA operates a fleet of 229 buses, 13 cutaway vans for Flex services, and 72 paratransit vans. They are maintained at two garages in Providence and one in Newport.

Fares for fixed-route and Flex trips are $2, with day and monthly passes available. Reduced fares are available for people over 65 and with disabilities. Fares can be paid with cash or with Wave smart card or mobile app, or RIde fares are $4.

In July 2025, RIPTA proposed service reductions affecting 58 routes, citing a $17.6 million budget deficit. The proposal would eliminate 17 routes, 6 route segments, 9 weekend service routes, and 8 additional routes operating on either Saturday or Sunday.

== Routes ==
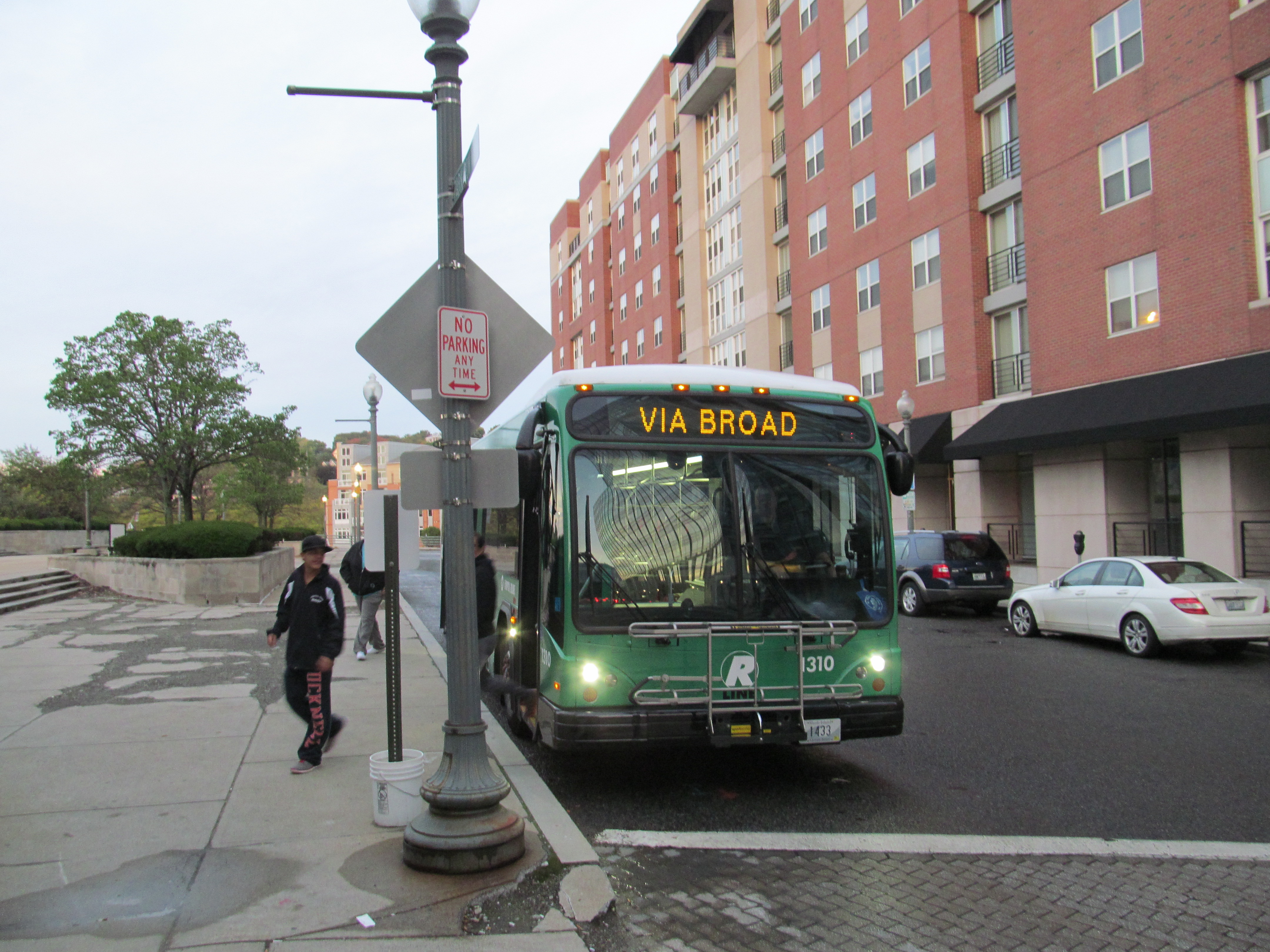
An R-Line bus in downtown Providence

RIPTA operates 59 year-round bus routes: 50 local routes, one rapid route, and eight limited-service express routes. Most of RIPTA's fixed-route bus lines are centered on three major hubs: Kennedy Plaza in Providence, Pawtucket/Central Falls station in Pawtucket, and Gateway Center in Newport.

The R-Line is a limited-stop "Rapid Bus" route between Cranston and Pawtucket via Providence. It has some bus rapid transit (BRT) characteristics, including frequent service and transit signal priority, but runs in mixed traffic without dedicated lanes. Nine routes combine to provide five-minute-or-better headways in the Downtown Transit Connector between Providence station and the Hospital District. This corridor has BRT elements including limited stops, bus shelters with real-time information, bus/bike lanes, and signal priority.

In addition to fixed-route services, RIPTA also provides Flex Service service, primarily settled around less populated areas in the state. These demand-responsive routes have fixed schedules for certain stops, but allow passengers to reserve trips within certain geographic areas. RIPTA operates special services to connect with the seasonal Providence–Newport ferry, to provide seasonal access to South County beaches, and to serve Providence Public School District high schools and Ocean State Academy Learning Center regular high school students.

=== List of routes ===
Number	Route
R-Line	Broad/North Main
1	Eddy/Hope/Benefit
3	Oakland Beach
4	Warwick Neck
6	Prairie / Roger Williams Park Zoo
9x	Pascoag Park-n-Ride
10x	North Scituate Park-n-Ride
12x	Arctic/117 Express Park-n-Ride
13	Coventry/Arctic/CCRI
14	West Bay
16	Bald Hill/NEIT/Quonset
17	Dyer/Pocasset
18	Union Ave
19	Plainfield/Westminster
20	Elmwood Ave/T.F. Green Airport
21	Reservoir/Garden City/CCRI
22	Pontiac Ave
23	Arctic/Crompton/Centre of New England
24L	Newport/Fall River/Providence
27	Broadway/Manton
28	Broadway/Hartford
29	CCRI Warwick/Conimicut
30	Arlington/Oaklawn
31	Cranston St
32	East Providence/Wampanoag/Seekonk Square
33	Riverside
34	East Providence/Seekonk Square
35	Rumford/Newport Ave
40	Butler/Elmgrove
50	Douglas Ave/Bryant University
51	Charles St/Twin River/CCRI
54	Lincoln/Woonsocket
55	Admiral/Providence College
56	Chalkstone Ave
57	Smith St
58	Mineral Spring/North Providence
59x	North Smithfield/Lincoln Mall Park-n-Ride
60	Providence/Newport
61x	Tiverton/East Bay Park-n-Ride
63	Broadway/Middletown Shops
64	Newport/URI Kingston
65X	Wakefield Express
66	URI/CCRI Warwick/Providence
67	Bellevue/Salve Regina Univ.
68	CCRI NPT/Mem. Blvd./First Beach
69	Narragansett/Galilee
71	Broad Street/Pawtucket Ave
72	Weeden/Central Falls
73	Mineral Spring/Twin River/CCRI
75	Dexter/Lincoln Mall
76	Central Ave
78	Beverage Hill Ave/East Providence
80	Armistice Blvd
87	Fairmount/Walnut Hill
88	Simmons Village Service
89	Walmart Cranston
92	RI College/Federal Hill/East Side
95x	Westerly Park-n-Ride
203	Narragansett Flex
204	Westerly Flex
231	South Aquidneck Flex
242	West Warwick/Coventry Flex
281	Woonsocket/Manville Flex
282	Pascoag/Slatersville Flex
301	Westerly/Hope Valley Rural Ride
QX	Quonset Point

== History ==
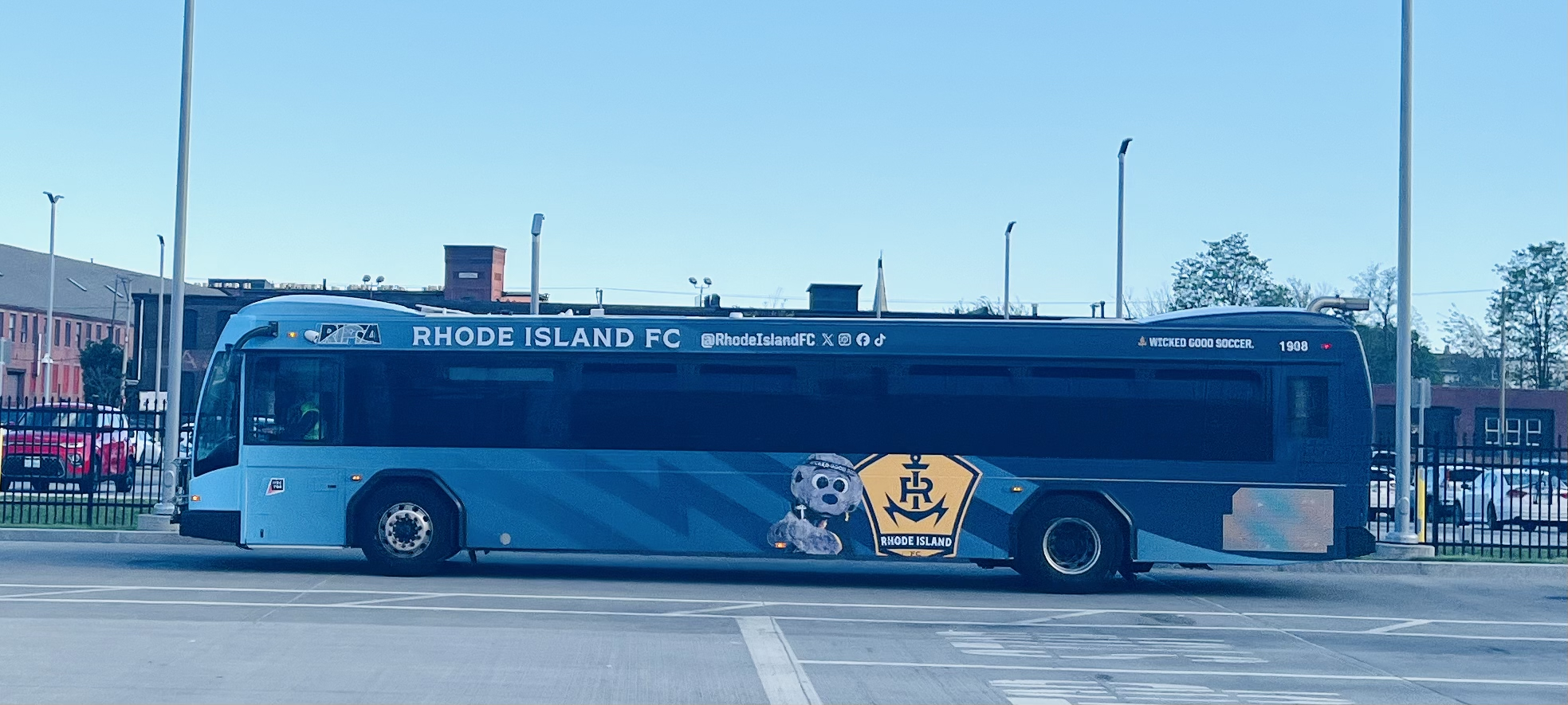
A RIPTA bus with a Rhode Island FC wrap.

RIPTA was created in 1964 by the Rhode Island General Assembly to supervise what had been a system of privately run bus and trolley systems. RIPTA began operating buses on July 1, 1966, inheriting services provided previously by the United Transit Company (formerly the Rhode Island Company. Woonsocket local service was expanded in 2011 to allow residents, many of whom do not own cars, to reach shopping areas outside town. R-Line service began on June 21, 2014.

The 1 Eddy/Hope/Benefit and 35 Rumford lines were the first two RIPTA routes with stops outside of Rhode Island's borders, as both routes end in a northern terminus at the South Attleboro MBTA station in Massachusetts. RIPTA was required to seek federal permission before the extending the routes across state lines to South Attleboro in 2013. Soon, the 32 and 34 were extended over the Massachusetts border to Seekonk Square. In August 2019, RIPTA added a third line running to Massachusetts, the 24L, an express line which includes stops in Fall River and Somerset that connect to Southeastern Regional Transit Authority lines. As part of the Summer 2025 service changes, RIPTA is proposing to extend Route 54 by less than a mile—from its current terminus in Woonsocket to the Stop & Shop in Bellingham, MA. This extension would improve access for workers and shoppers while also offering a convenient layover location with restroom facilities for operators.

In November 2019, RIPTA received $8 million in federal funding to add additional hubs at the Community College of Rhode Island in Warwick and the University of Rhode Island in Kingston.
