= R-Line (RIPTA) =

Bus service in Rhode Island, United States

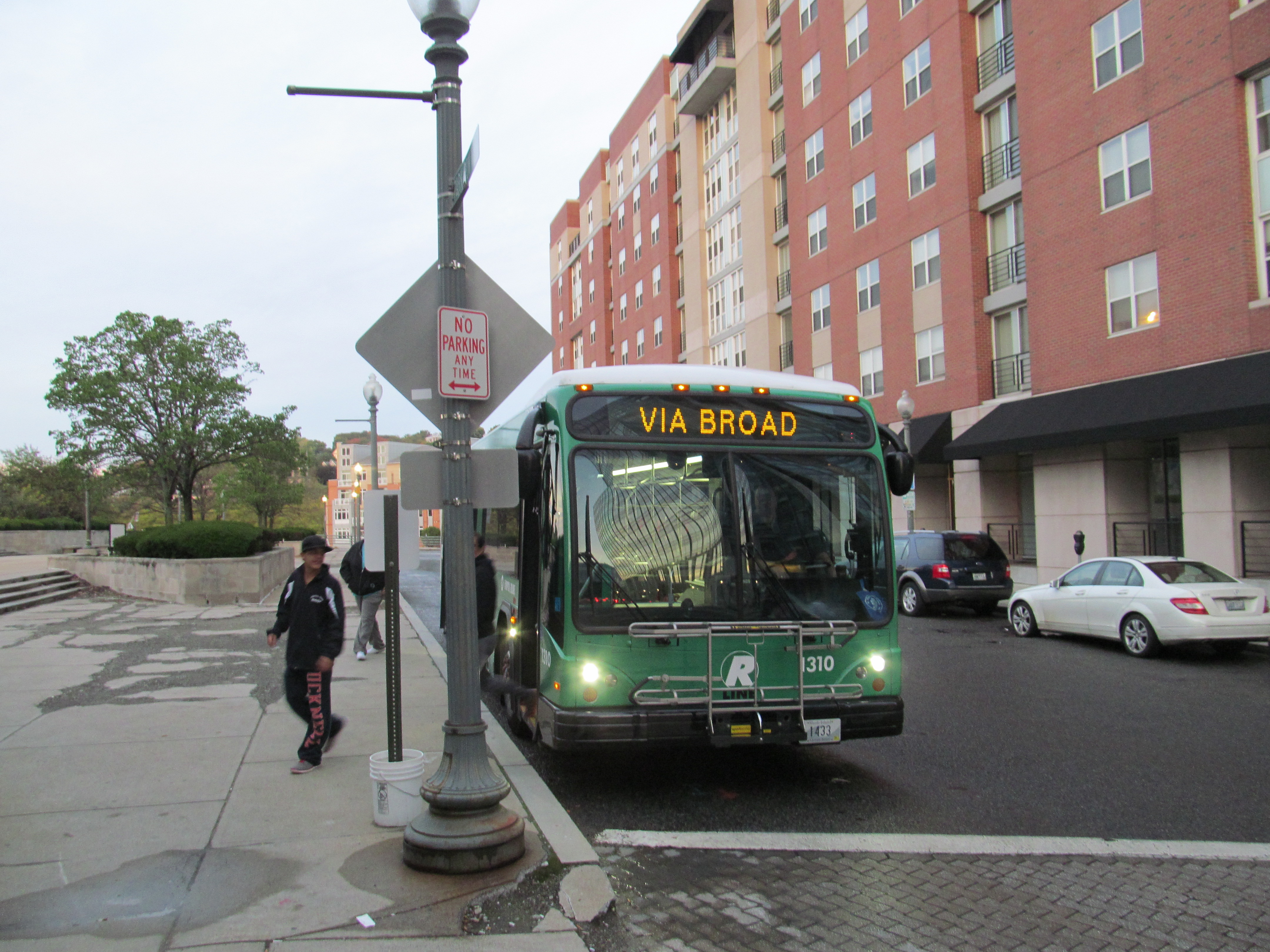
A southbound R-Line bus at Providence Station in October 2014

The R-Line is a rapid bus service in Rhode Island, United States, running from Pawtucket to Cranston via downtown Providence. This route was a combination of the old routes 11 and 99. Operated by the Rhode Island Public Transit Authority (RIPTA), it is the agency's first rapid bus route, and the second such system to open in New England (after the MBTA Silver Line). After several years of planning and construction, R-Line service began on June 21, 2014.

== Operations ==
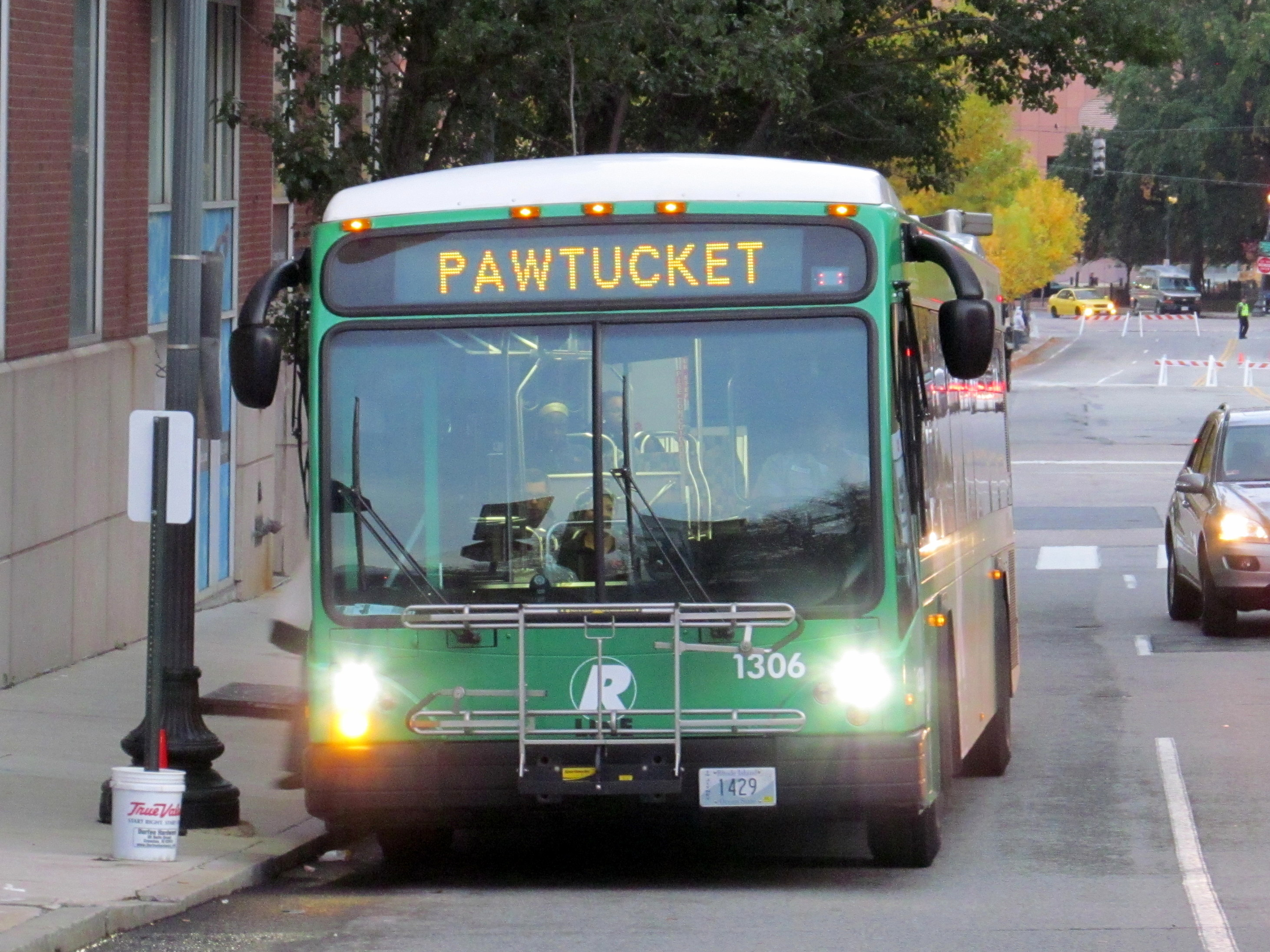
R-Line buses run in mixed traffic and have branding distinct from the rest of the RIPTA system.

The R-Line is branded as "Rapid Bus" rather than true bus rapid transit because it operates in mixed traffic rather than on fully dedicated lanes. However, the service incorporates other BRT elements including high-frequency limited-stop service, transit signal priority, queue jumps, and upgraded bus shelters, as well as branding separate from RIPTA's local bus system. The service combines the former 11 and 99 local bus routes, which were the two busiest in Rhode Island. It was conceived as an inexpensive way to improve service on the two busy routes.

The R-Line runs on 10-minute headways during the day, 20 minutes at night, and 15–20 minutes on weekends. Service runs from 5:00 am to 1:00 am on weekdays and Saturdays, and 6:30 am to midnight on Sundays. The line has 56 stops, largely placed in pairs on opposite sides of the street (except for the terminal loops). 25 have "wayfinding tokens" with systems for future audio announcements, while the remainder have enhanced bus stop signs.

Under a program titled The Artists Of The R-Line, local artists were selected to design wall panels and seating at 17 of the line's bus stops.

== History ==
RIPTA was created by the state in 1964 to take over the bus routes of the United Transit Company, the descendant of the former Rhode Island Company streetcar system. The agency inherited a system of Providence-based local routes with rapidly falling ridership; over the next half-century RIPTA expanded service to cover more of the state. However, many of the local routes suffered from slow speeds and routes that followed former streetcar services rather than newer development.

In 2013, RIPTA released plans for major service changes, including the removal of some bus stops and a focusing of resources on higher-demand routes, designed to modernize their system under a constant budget. The report proposed rapid bus service on a combination of the 11 and 99 routes, as well as a long-planned extension of other services to South Attleboro station.

Transit signal priority construction began in February 2013 and was largely complete by the end of the year, with minor adjustments lasting until April 2014. Passenger amenities including shelters were installed in May and June 2014.

Service on the 11 and 99 continued normally during construction. R-Line service began on June 21, 2014, along with implementation of much of the 2013 plan. A new route, 98 Pawtucket Ave, began operations the same day to maintain service on Pawtucket Avenue southwest of downtown Pawtucket, which the 99 had traveled on but the R-Line does not. The 98 was later merged with the 71 Broad Street route to form the 71 Broad Street / Pawtucket Avenue route.

=== Future expansion ===
RIPTA plans to convert other high-ridership local routes into rapid bus routes; the 20, 27, and 56 routes will be given priority for conversion.
