= Burbank Elementary School =

Burbank Elementary School or Luther Burbank Elementary School may refer to:

- Burbank Elementary School, Chicago Public Schools - in Chicago, Illinois
- Burbank Elementary School, Houston Independent School District - in Houston, Texas
- Burbank Elementary School, Pasadena Unified School District - in the Altadena section of unincorporated Los Angeles County, California
- Burbank Elementary School, Hayward Unified School District - in Hayward, California
- Burbank Elementary School, Long Beach Unified School District - in Long Beach, California
- Burbank Elementary School, San Bernardino City Unified School District - in San Bernardino, California (closed 2012)
- Luther Burbank Elementary School (Detroit), on the National Register of Historic Places
