= List of Rhode Island railroads =

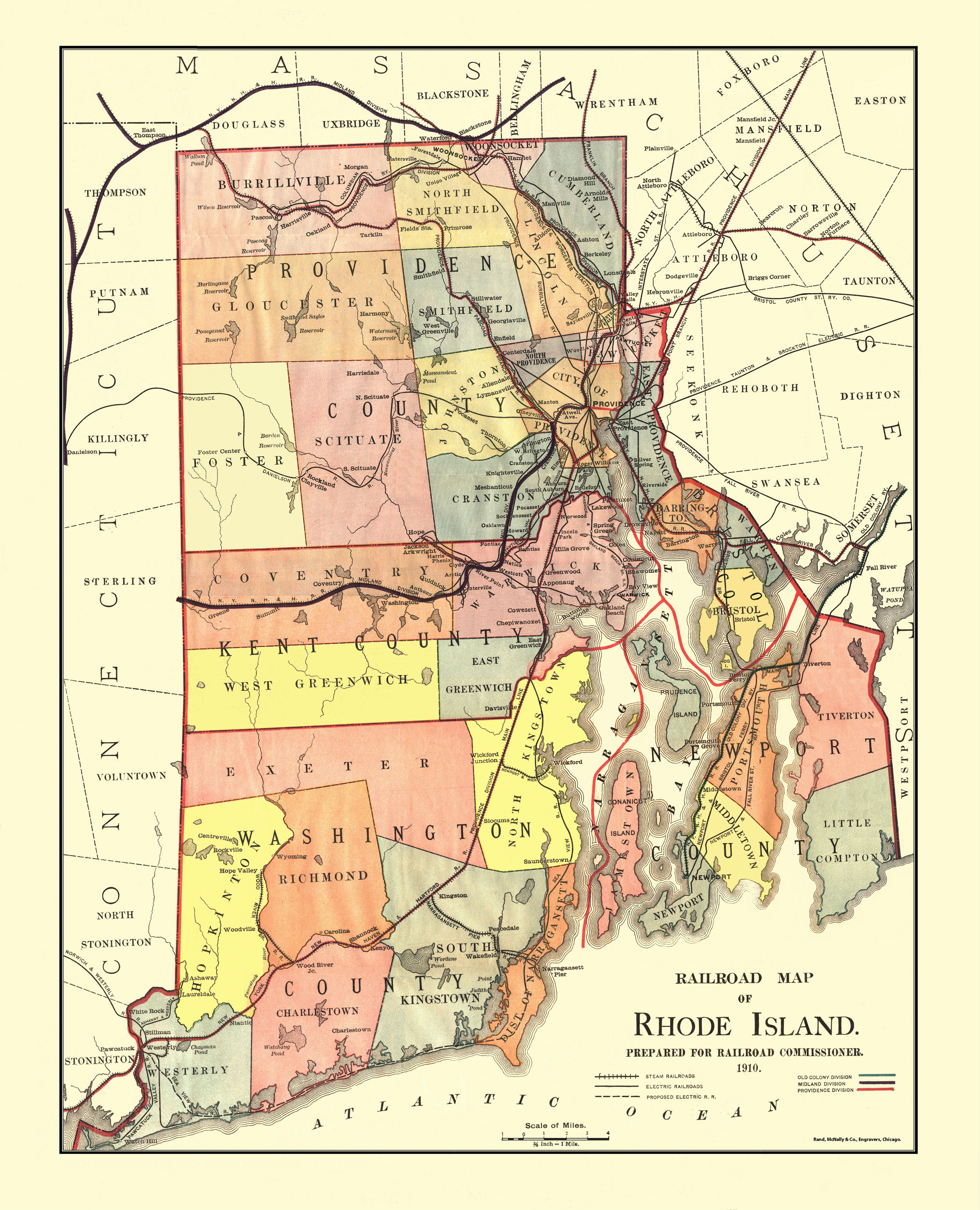
A 1910 map showing nearly the maximum extent of Rhode Island's railroads

As of February 2022, a total of five railroads operated in the U.S. state of Rhode Island. Freight services are largely operated by the Providence and Worcester Railroad, which interchanges with the state's only other freight railroad, the Seaview Transportation Company, a switching and terminal railroad serving the Port of Davisville. Passenger service is provided along Rhode Island's portion of the Northeast Corridor by Amtrak, supplemented by MBTA Commuter Rail service from Wickford Junction northbound towards Boston. Rhode Island is also home to one heritage railroad, the Newport and Narragansett Bay Railroad, which operates excursions on a segment of track on Aquidneck Island which is disconnected from the rest of the United States rail network.

== Freight carriers ==
Name	Reporting Mark	Image	Predecessor(s)	Starting Year	Description	Owner	Reference
Providence and Worcester Railroad	PW, PWRZ	P&W light engines at Pawtucket station	Conrail; Penn Central	1844 (originally) 1973 (current system)	Originally founded in 1844, was leased by the New Haven in 1892 but continued to exist as a company. Split from NH successor Penn Central in 1973. Took over all Conrail operations in Rhode Island in 1982. Has trackage rights on the Northeast Corridor, in addition to owning its main line from Providence to the Massachusetts state line and a branch to East Providence.	Genesee & Wyoming	
Seaview Transportation Company	SVTX		United States Navy	1978	Formed in 1978 to continue freight service for customers in and around Quonset Point Air National Guard Station, formerly operated by the United States Navy. Serves a major industrial park, interchanges with the Providence and Worcester.	Independent	

== Passenger carriers ==
Name	Reporting Mark	Image	Predecessor(s)	Starting Year	Description	Owner	Reference
Amtrak	AMTK	Avelia Liberty Slocum RI	Penn Central	1971	National intercity passenger railroad of the United States. Took over intercity passenger service from Penn Central starting May 1, 1971. As of February 2022, operates the Northeast Regional and Acela in Rhode Island.	Federal government of the United States	
MBTA Commuter Rail	MBTX	Train arriving at Wickford Junction station, June 2013	Penn Central	1976	The MBTA began subsidizing Rhode Island service on the Providence/Stoughton Line in 1976, and purchased the line's rolling stock from Penn Central that year. As of February 2022, service operates to and from Boston to a southern terminus at Wickford Junction.	Massachusetts Department of Transportation	
Newport and Narragansett Bay Railroad		The Ice Cream Train, Melville RI	Newport Dinner Train Old Colony and Newport Scenic Railroad	2014	Heritage railroad operating excursions on Aquidneck Island. The railroad operates several different heritage trains, and also offers railbike rides.	Seaview Transportation Company	

== Defunct railroads ==
Name	Mark	System (Note: This is one or more of the Class I railroads that the railroad became part of, if any.)	From	To	Successor	Description	Reference
Boston, Hartford and Erie Railroad		NH	1865	1874	New York and New England Railroad		
Boston and Providence Railroad		NH	1834	1888	New York, New Haven and Hartford Railroad		
Consolidated Rail Corporation	CR		1976	1982	Providence and Worcester Railroad	Inherited Penn Central's operations in Rhode Island; all Rhode Island lines were sold to P&W in 1982.	
Fall River, Warren and Providence Railroad		NH	1862	1892	Old Colony Railroad		
Hartford, Providence and Fishkill Railroad		NH	1849	1879	New York and New England Railroad		
Moshassuck Valley Railroad	MOV		1874	1982	Providence and Worcester Railroad		
Narragansett Pier Railroad	NAP	NH	1868	1981	N/A		
New England Railroad		NH	1895	1908	New York, New Haven and Hartford Railroad		
New York and Boston Railroad		NH	1853	1865	Boston, Hartford and Erie Railroad		
New York and New England Railroad		NH	1873	1895	New England Railroad		
New York, New Haven and Hartford Railroad	NH	NH	1893	1969	Penn Central Transportation Company		
New York, Providence and Boston Railroad		NH	1832	1893	New York, New Haven and Hartford Railroad		
New York, Providence and Boston and Old Colony Railroad Terminal Company		NH	1891	1904	Providence Terminal Company		
Newport and Fall River Railroad		NH	1846	1863	Old Colony and Newport Railway		
Newport and Wickford Railroad and Steamboat Company		NH	1870	1909	New York, New Haven and Hartford Railroad		
Old Colony Railroad		NH	1872	1947	New York, New Haven and Hartford Railroad		
Old Colony and Newport Railway		NH	1863	1872	Old Colony Railroad		
Pawtuxet Valley Railroad		NH	1868	1907	New York, New Haven and Hartford Railroad		
Penn Central Transportation Company	PC		1969	1976	Consolidated Rail Corporation		
Pontiac Branch Railroad		NH	1875	1885	New York, Providence and Boston Railroad		
Providence and Bristol Railroad		NH	1850	1852	Providence, Warren and Bristol Railroad		
Providence and Plainfield Railroad		NH	1846	1851	Hartford, Providence and Fishkill Railroad		
Providence and Springfield Railroad		NH	1872	1905	New York, New Haven and Hartford Railroad		
Providence Terminal Company		NH	1904	1906	New York, New Haven and Hartford Railroad		
Providence, Warren and Bristol Railroad		NH	1852	1947	New York, New Haven and Hartford Railroad		
Rhode Island Company		NH	1902	1919	United Electric Railways	Primary an electric railway company; leased the Narragansett Pier Railroad from 1911 to 1918	
Rhode Island Central Railroad		NH	1879	1880	New York, Providence and Boston Railroad		
Rhode Island and Massachusetts Railroad		NH	1872	1907	New York, New Haven and Hartford Railroad		
Rhode Island Mining Railroad		NH	1865	1872	Rhode Island and Massachusetts Railroad		
Seekonk Branch Railroad		NH	1836	1839	Boston and Providence Railroad	Was located in what was part of Massachusetts before the boundary was moved in 1862	
Warren and Fall River Railroad		NH	1856	1862	Fall River, Warren and Providence Railroad		
Warwick Railroad		NH	1873	1880	New York, Providence and Boston Railroad	Built a railroad from Cranston to Oakland Beach, shut down in 1879 and taken over by the NYP&B as a subsidiary.	
Warwick Railway	WRWK		1949	1982	Providence and Worcester Railroad	Took over the former Warwick Railroad line from United Electric Railways in 1949. Operated electric locomotives until 1952, provided freight service on a 1 mile length of track until 1982.	
Wickford Railroad		NH	1864	1870	Newport and Wickford Railroad and Steamboat Company		
Wood River Branch Railroad		NH	1872	1947	N/A	Abandoned outright, with no successor.	
Woonasquatucket Railroad		NH	1857	1872	Providence and Springfield Railroad		
Woonsocket and Pascoag Railroad		NH	1887	1907	New York, New Haven and Hartford Railroad		
Woonsocket Union Railroad		NH	1850	1853	New York and Boston Railroad		

Electric

- Bay State Street Railway
- Fall River and Stone Bridge Street Railway
- Groton and Stonington Street Railway
- Middletown and Portsmouth Street Railway
- Newport and Fall River Street Railway
- Newport and Providence Railway
- Newport Street Railway
- Norwich and Westerly Railway
- Old Colony Street Railway
- Pawcatuck Valley Railway
- Pawtucket Street Railway
- Providence Cable Tramway Company (also a cable-car line)
- Providence and Danielson Railway
- Providence, Warren and Bristol Railroad
- Rhode Island Company
- Rhode Island Suburban Railway
- Sea View Railroad
- Union Railroad
- United Electric Railways
- Warwick Railway

Not completed

- Southern New England Railway

== Bibliography ==
- Karr, Ronald Dale (2017). The Rail Lines of Southern New England (2nd ed.). Pepperell, Massachusetts: Branch Line Press. ISBN 978-0-942147-12-4. OCLC 1038017689.

== See also ==
- List of railroad lines in Rhode Island (a list of all corridors that have existed, not dealing with ownership changes)
