= List of railroad lines in Rhode Island =

This is a list of all freight railroad (not streetcar or rapid transit) lines that have been built in Rhode Island, and does not deal with ownership changes from one company to another. The lines are named by the first company to build or consolidate them. Unless noted, every railroad eventually became part of the New York, New Haven and Hartford Railroad system.

== List of railroad lines in Rhode Island ==
Name	From	To	Branches	Notes
Boston and Providence Railroad	Massachusetts state line in Pawtucket	downtown Providence	East Providence Branch, Massachusetts state line in Pawtucket to Fox Point in Providence	was jointly owned with the Providence and Worcester Railroad south of Boston Switch in Central Falls
Providence and Worcester Railroad	Massachusetts state line in North Smithfield	downtown Providence	East Providence Branch, Valley Falls (in Cumberland) to East Providence (with a section in Massachusetts)	was jointly owned with the Boston and Providence Railroad south of Boston Switch in Central Falls
Rhode Island and Massachusetts Railroad	Valley Falls (in Cumberland)	Massachusetts state line in Cumberland (with a section in Massachusetts)		
East Side Railroad Tunnel	East Providence	downtown Providence		built by the New York, New Haven and Hartford Railroad
Moshassuck Valley Railroad	Woodlawn (in Pawtucket)	Saylesville (in Lincoln)		remained independent
Seekonk Branch Railroad	Short line in East Providence			
Providence, Warren and Bristol Railroad	East Providence	Bristol		
Fall River, Warren and Providence Railroad	Warren	Massachusetts state line in Warren		
Newport and Fall River Railroad	Massachusetts state line in Tiverton	Newport		
Charles River Railroad	Massachusetts state line in Woonsocket	Woonsocket		
Woonsocket and Pascoag Railroad	Woonsocket	Harrisville (in Burrillville)		
Providence and Springfield Railroad	downtown Providence	Massachusetts state line at Pascoag		
Hartford, Providence and Fishkill Railroad	downtown Providence	Connecticut state line in Coventry	Dorrance Street Branch in Providence	
New York, Providence and Boston Railroad	downtown Providence	Connecticut state line in Westerly	South Providence Branch, Cranston Junction (in Cranston) to South Providence (in Providence)	
Pontiac Branch Railroad	Auburn (in Cranston)	Pontiac (in Warwick)		
Pawtuxet Valley Railroad	Pontiac (in Warwick)	Hope (in Scituate)		
Warwick Railroad	Auburn (in Cranston)	Buttonwoods (in Warwick)		remained independent, later became a street railway
Naval Air Station Quonset Point	Davisville (in North Kingstown)	Quonset Point (in North Kingstown)		remained independent (U.S. Government owned)
Newport and Wickford Railroad	Wickford Junction (in North Kingstown)	Wickford (in North Kingstown)		
Narragansett Pier Railroad	Kingston (in South Kingstown)	Narragansett Pier (in Narragansett)		remained independent
Wood River Branch Railroad	Wood River Junction (in Richmond)	Hope Valley (in Hopkinton)		remained independent
Westerly Granite Quarry Proprietor's Railroad	Westerly	granite quarries		
Southern New England Railway	Massachusetts state line in Woonsocket	Providence	South Providence Branch, around the west side of Providence	never finished, built by the Grand Trunk Railway

== See also ==
- List of Rhode Island railroads
