= Wickford station =

Wickford station may refer to:

- Wickford railway station in Essex, England
- Wickford Junction station in Rhode Island, United States
