= Wickford (disambiguation) =

Wickford may refer to:

- Wickford, Essex
  - Wickford railway station in Wickford, Essex
  - Rayleigh and Wickford (UK Parliament constituency)
- Wickford, Rhode Island, USA
  - Wickford Junction station, an MBTA station in Wickford, Rhode Island
