= New York, Providence and Boston Railroad =

New York, New Haven and Hartford Railroad subsidiary

- NYP&B at consolidation
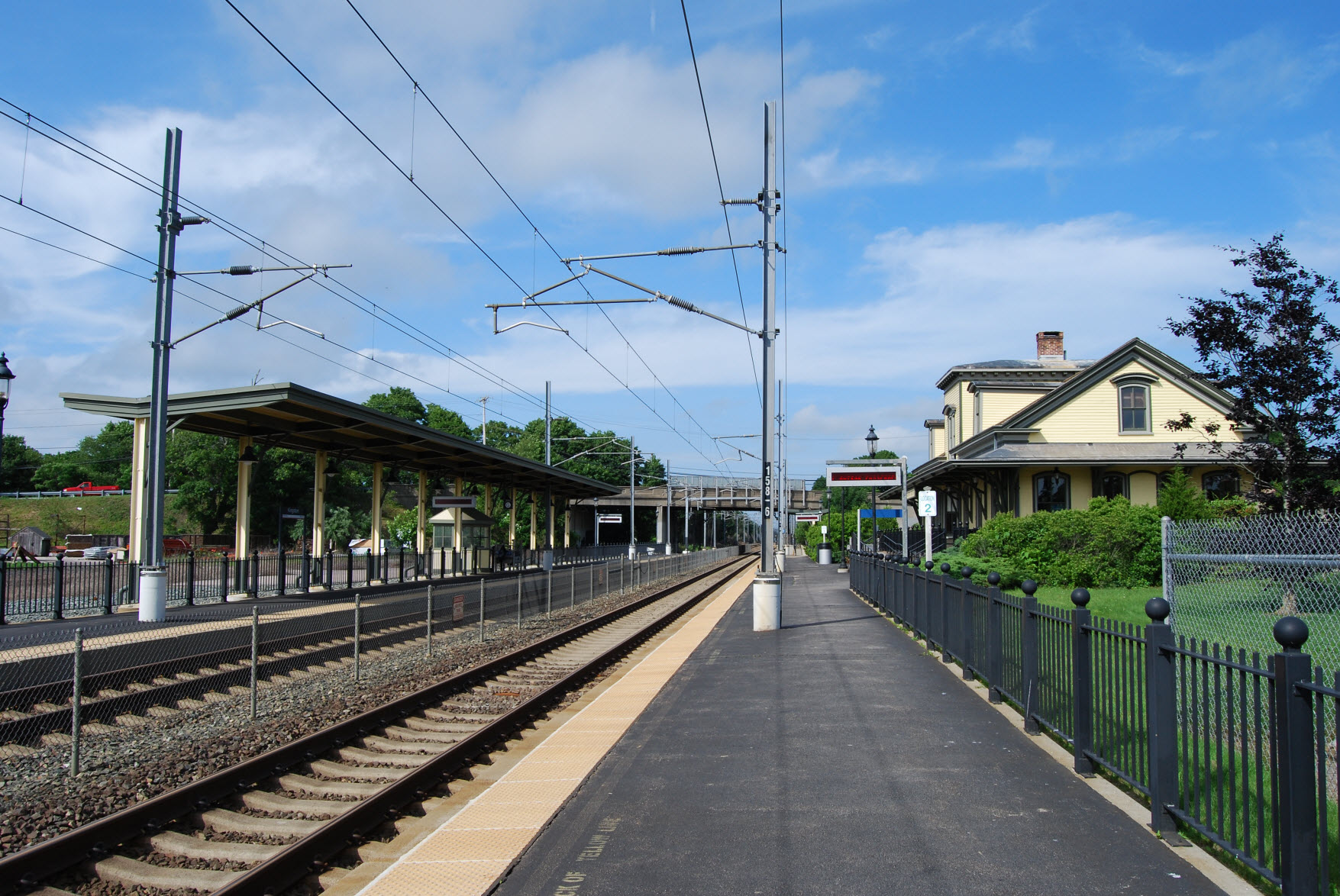
- Former New York, Providence and Boston line (now Amtrak), Kingston, Rhode Island

Overview
- Locale: New London, Connecticut-Providence, Rhode Island
- Dates of operation: 1837–1893
- Successor: New York, New Haven and Hartford Railroad

Technical
- Track gauge: 4 ft 8 1/2 in (1,435 mm) standard gauge

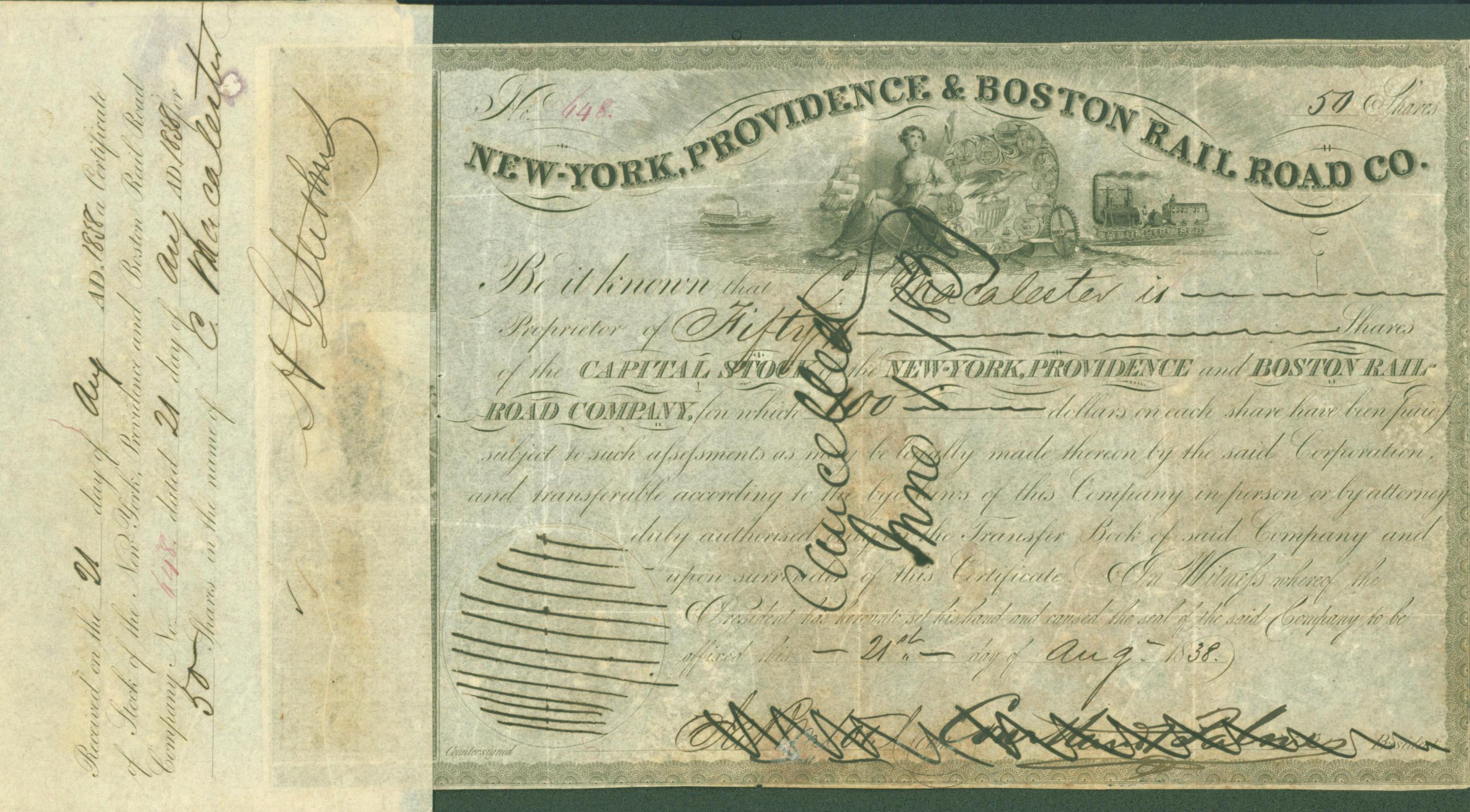
Share of the New York, Providence and Boston Rail Road Company, issued 21 August 1838

The New York, Providence and Boston Railroad, normally called the Stonington Line (for its western terminus), was a railroad company that connected Providence, Rhode Island, and Stonington, Connecticut. Originally intended to connect Providence to New York City via steamboats calling at Stonington, it was chartered in 1832 and began operations in 1837. The company was leased by the New York, New Haven and Hartford Railroad in 1893. It is now part of Amtrak's high-speed Northeast Corridor.

== History ==
Prior to the building of the NYP&B, travelers between New York City and Boston had to pass around Point Judith, Rhode Island and its rough waters to reach the Boston and Providence Railroad in Providence. The B&P was completed in 1835 and began operating the steamer Lexington between Providence and New York, adding the Massachusetts in 1836.

The New York and Stonington Railroad was chartered in Connecticut in May 1832 and the New York, Providence and Boston Railroad in Rhode Island in June of that year to fix the problem. On July 1, 1833 they consolidated to form a new New York, Providence and Boston Railroad. Ground was broken by the subsidiary Providence and Stonington Railroad at Stonington, Connecticut on August 14, 1833. On November 17, 1837 the line opened between Stonington and a pier at South Providence, about 1 mile downriver from the city center. At Stonington docks connected to steamboats to New York City through Long Island Sound, and later to the Long Island Rail Road at Greenport, New York, opened July 29, 1844. At Providence, a short car float across the Providence River led to the docks of the Boston and Providence Railroad at India Point in Providence, where travelers could continue on to Boston.

Steamboat service from New York to Stonington commenced in November 1837 under the Boston and New York Transportation company, which was soon succeeded by the New Jersey Steam Navigation Company. On January 13, 1840, the latter company's steamer Lexington burned and sank with a loss of 140 lives; there were only four survivors. Cornelius Vanderbilt acquired control of the railroad in 1847. The California Gold Rush in 1849 caused a boom in traffic to the Isthmus. Vanderbilt sold control in order to help fund an ocean going steamship line to serve the traffic.

On May 1, 1848, the NYP&B opened an alignment to the new Union Station in Providence, where it connected directly to both the newly opened Providence and Worcester Railroad and the new main line for the Boston and Providence Railroad. This provided direct connections from Stonington to both Boston and Worcester and locations in between. The B&P's old alignment was kept as a branch to transport passengers and freight to and from the pier at India Point in Providence for transfer to and from the steam boats to New York City and other points as far south as Galveston, TX. Trade in raw cotton moving north to New England textile mills, and finished goods moving south from New England factories remained strong until the Great Depression.

On November 1, 1859 the NYP&B leased the New Haven, New London and Stonington Railroad, less than a year after its completion, giving it a line from Providence to New Haven, Connecticut, though with two ferries, one across the Thames River at New London and another across the Connecticut River. The terminal for steamboats connecting to the Long Island Rail Road was moved to Groton, on the east shore of the Thames River. In 1864, the NYP&B purchased the NHNL&S line east of Groton; the remainder was leased by the New York and New Haven Railroad in 1870.

During the 1860s, service between New York and Stonington was provided by the Merchants' Steamship Company. This concern suspended service after suffering heavy losses in three disasters: the burning of the steamer Commonwealth on December 29, 1865; the grounding, and recovery at great expense, of the steamer Plymouth Rock in January 1866; and the wreck of the steamer Commodore on December 27, 1866.

In 1868 the Stonington Line revived the New York-Stonington steamship operation by organizing the subsidiary Stonington Steamship Company, which placed in service the steamers Stonington and Narragansett. A third vessel, the Rhode Island, was built in 1873.

The Stonington Steamship Company merged in 1875 with the Providence and New York Steamship Company, primarily a freight carrier between the two named ports, to form the Providence and Stonington Steamship Company. The Rhode Island was assigned to the New York-Providence route, joined in 1877 by a new steamer, the Massachusetts. On June 11, 1880, the Narragansett and Stonington collided in heavy fog, causing the Narragansett to catch fire and burn with a loss of 30 lives. Also in 1880, the Rhode Island was wrecked, but her engine was salvaged and was installed in a new steamer of the same name, built in 1882.

In 1889 a bridge was built across the Thames River, connecting the two segments and completing the all-rail Shore Line. The steamship operation was augmented in 1889 with the construction of the steamer Connecticut for the Providence route. All the foregoing steamers had been paddlers, but in 1892 the propellers Maine and New Hampshire were built for the Stonington route.

During 1892 the New York, New Haven and Hartford Railroad acquired the NYP&B, merging it on February 13, 1893. The New Haven discontinued the New York-Stonington steamship route in 1900, ending the existence of the Providence and Stonington Steamship Company. A New Haven subsidiary, the New England Steamship Company, continued the New York-Providence route with various steamers until May 1937.

The original line that reached the docks in Stonington from the east was abandoned on September 27, 1914.

In 1969 Penn Central absorbed the NYNH&H. Penn Central went bankrupt in June 1970, and was merged into Conrail in 1976, but the old NYP&B main line was sold to Amtrak (in Connecticut) and the state of Rhode Island. It now hosts Amtrak's Acela Express high-speed trains and Northeast Regional conventional service. The MBTA's Providence/Stoughton Line was extended in 2010 over the old NYP&B past Providence to a new station at T. F. Green Airport in Warwick, Rhode Island; the line was further extended in 2012 to its current southern terminus at Wickford Junction in North Kingstown. There is a proposal to extend the line once more to the current Amtrak station in Kingston.

== Branches ==
Groton
When the bridge over the Thames River to New London, Connecticut opened in 1889, the old line to the docks was kept as a branch.
Westerly Granite Quarry
The Westerly Granite Quarry Proprietor's Railroad, a short branch in Westerly, Rhode Island, was operated by the NYP&B.
Wood River
The Wood River Branch Railroad, a branch from Richmond Switch north to Hope Valley, opened in 1874 and operated independently.
Narragansett Pier
The Narragansett Pier Railroad opened in 1876 from Kingston east to Narragansett Pier, and was independently owned and operated by the Hazard Family to service their textile mills.
Wickford
The Newport and Wickford Railroad and Steamboat Company was a branch from Wickford Junction east to Wickford, Rhode Island, where a connecting steamship service crossed the Narragansett Bay to Newport. It opened in 1874 and was operated by the NYP&B.
Pontiac/Hope
The Pontiac Branch Railroad opened in the late 1870s and was leased by the NYP&B in 1880 and bought in 1885. It provided a branch from Auburn, Rhode Island southwest to Pontiac. The Pawtuxet Valley Railroad opened in 1874 as a leased branch of the Hartford, Providence and Fishkill Railroad from River Point northwest to Hope. In 1884 the lease was transferred to the NYP&B and a connection was built between the Pontiac Branch at Pontiac and River Point.
Warwick
The Warwick Railroad opened in 1875 as a branch from Auburn southeast into Warwick. It became the Rhode Island Central Railroad in 1879, and later became part of a street railway. The line was purchased by the Providence and Worcester in 1982 and shut down permanently a few years later when a trucking company which was the last remaining customer ended operations.
South Providence
The old main line to the docks south of downtown Providence, Rhode Island was kept when the new alignment to downtown opened in 1848. This line is currently owned and operated by the Providence and Worcester. Several times a month, 80 car unit trains transport ethanol from producers in the Midwest to the Motiva Enterprises facility on the Providence waterfront for local use as well as for transfer to ocean-going tankers. It has also been used in recent years for the movement of imported coal from the Port of Providence to various power plants in New England and even Upstate New York.

== See also ==
- List of New York, New Haven and Hartford Railroad precursors
