= Warwick Railway =

Railroad in Rhode Island, United States

- Warwick Railroad
- Map of the Warwick Railway with its extension to Buttonwoods
- Warwick Railway 104 hauls a tank car in Cranston

Overview
- Operator: Providence and Worcester Railroad
- Reporting mark: WRWK
- Dates of operation: 1875–1982
- Successor: Providence and Worcester Railroad

Technical
- Track gauge: 4 ft 8 1/2 in (1,435 mm) standard gauge
- Length: 10 miles (16 km) (historical maximum); 1 mile (1.6 km) (1954 to present)

The Warwick Railway (reporting mark WRWK) was a railroad in Rhode Island, United States. It was originally chartered in 1873 under the name Warwick Railroad, with a route connecting Cranston to Oakland Beach, eight miles (13 km) away. Opened in 1875, the company survived until 1879 when it declared bankruptcy and shut down; it was resurrected in 1880 as the Rhode Island Central Railroad under New York, Providence and Boston Railroad (NYP&B) ownership and extended by two miles (3.2 km) in length. Following the New York, New Haven and Hartford Railroad's purchase of the NYP&B in 1892, operations continued with steam power until the Rhode Island Central Railroad's 1899 consolidation with the Rhode Island Suburban Railway, at which point the line was electrified and trolleys replaced steam locomotives. Control subsequently passed to the United Electric Railways in 1921. Passenger trolley service was discontinued in 1935, but freight service continued; the following year, the line was cut back from its 10-mile (16 km) maximum length to just two miles (3.2 km).

In 1949, the line was purchased by a newly formed Warwick Railway, which ended electrified service in favor of diesel locomotives in 1952, and abandoned another mile (1.6 km) of track in 1954. The Warwick Railway provided freight service until 1979, when the Providence and Worcester Railroad (P&W) began service following the Warwick Railway becoming insolvent. The P&W formally purchased the Warwick Railway in 1982, and maintained freight operations until 1999 before placing the tracks out of service. Two decades later in 2016, the Providence and Worcester began work to reopen the remaining tracks to serve a new customer shipping waste oil.

== History ==
=== Founding and construction ===
The first incarnation of the Warwick Railway was formed by charter in 1873 as the Warwick Railroad, with authorization to build from a connection with the New York, Providence and Boston Railroad (NYP&B) in Cranston, Rhode Island, to the coastal neighborhood of Oakland Beach, Rhode Island. The last spike was driven to complete this 8.52-mile (13.71 km) long line on December 3, 1874, at a total cost of approximately $200,000 (equivalent to $4,574,706 in 2020); passenger service began on July 4 of the following year. Initially, the NYP&B operated the line, until the Warwick Railroad began operations itself in 1876.

=== Operations, bankruptcy, and NYP&B takeover ===
Service was initially provided by a steam locomotive pulling passenger cars, but within one to two years this was replaced by a steam dummy to cut costs. Service became unreliable, with anecdotes of passengers gathering water from nearby wells to feed the dummy's boiler when it ran dry during operations. Continuing troubles with services led to the Warwick Railroad going bankrupt and ending operations in 1879. The Warwick's connection in Cranston, the New York, Providence and Boston Railroad, decided to take over the bankrupt line and operate it, reorganizing the Warwick as a new subsidiary named the Rhode Island Central Railroad and reopening service in 1880. A two-mile (3.2 km) extension was built westward from Oakland Beach to Buttonwoods, Rhode Island, the same year.

=== New Haven Railroad and United Electric Railways control ===
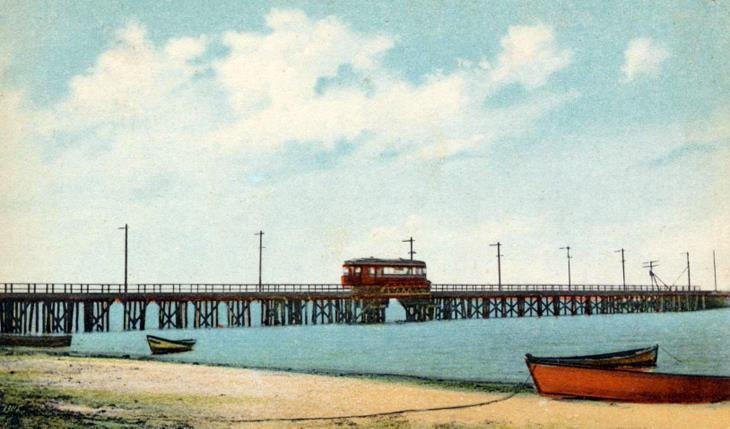
A trolley on the line at Buttonwoods Cove, circa 1907-1915

The NYP&B was taken over by the New York, New Haven and Hartford Railroad in 1892, and the Rhode Island Central in turn passed to the New Haven as well. Operations continued largely as before until 1899, when the New Haven consolidated the Rhode Island Central with its Rhode Island Suburban Railway, its streetcar subsidiary in Rhode Island. As a result of this consolidation, the line was electrified and steam power replaced with trolleys. In 1921, United Electric Railways took over from the Rhode Island Suburban Railway, which had gone into receivership. Faced with increasing competition from automobiles, trolley service declined in frequency before being eliminated in 1935. The line continued to be operated in freight service with electric locomotives, but was abandoned from Buttonwoods to the Lakewood neighborhood of Warwick, leaving two miles (3.2 km) remaining in operation.

=== Warwick Railway ===
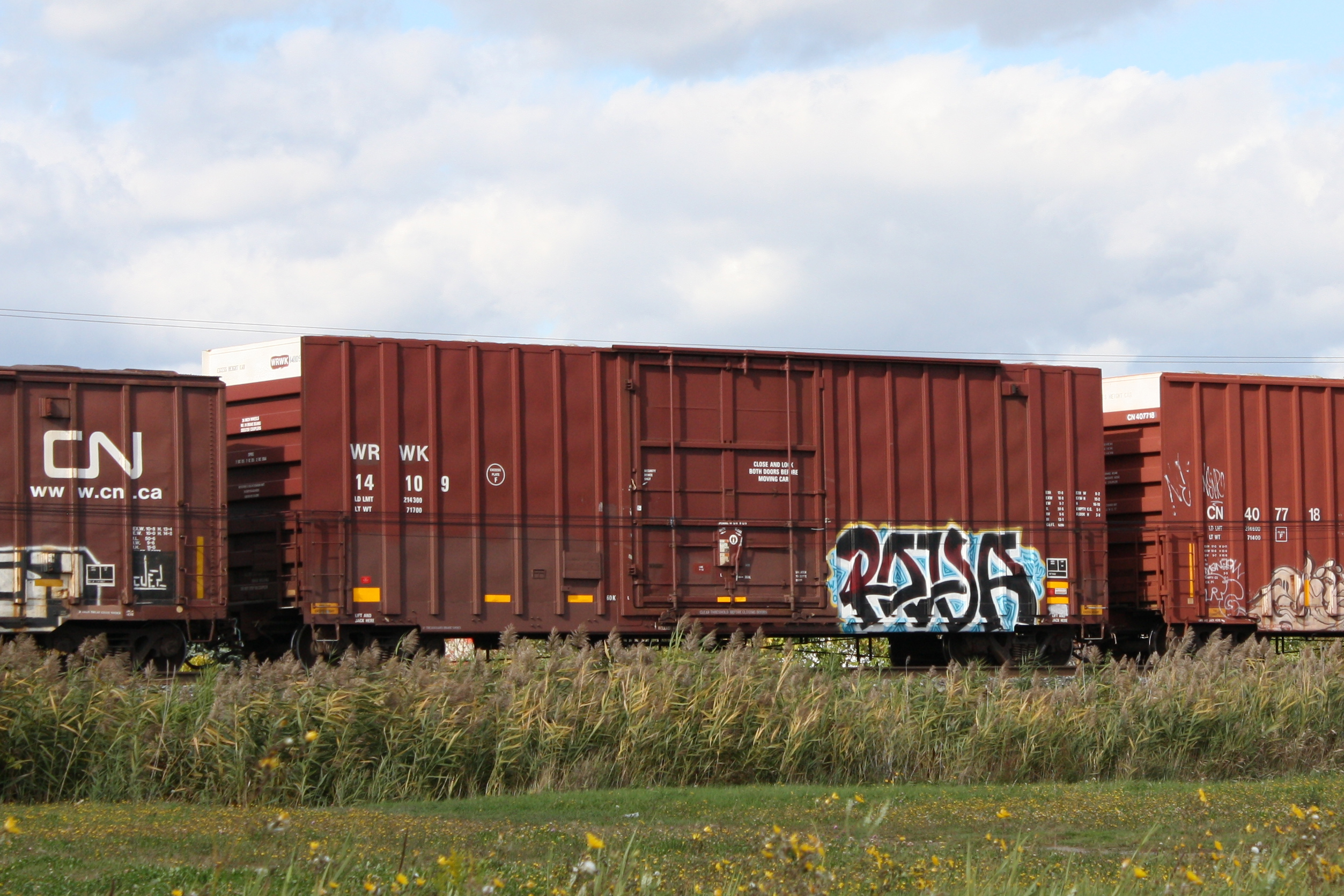
Despite the company's merger, railroad cars can still be seen with WRWK reporting marks; the Providence and Worcester Railroad owns the right to the WRWK mark

A newly formed Warwick Railway purchased the remaining line from United Electric in 1949 and began independent freight operations. Electrified service ended in 1952, with the motive power changing to diesel locomotives. In 1954 another mile of the line was abandoned, reducing the Warwick to just under one mile (1.6 km) in length. A husband and wife team, Oscar and Shirley Greene, took over the railroad in 1960. Oscar Greene had previously been a motorman with the United Electric Railway when it operated the line, as had Loris J. Bass, the company's only other employee. Shirley Greene referred to Bass, who in addition to being the company's chief engineer, simultaneously held the roles of "brakeman, conductor, maintenance of way crew [and] track engineer", as the "most needed man in Cranston". By 1970, the railroad was regularly operating two vintage switcher locomotives, including a 425-horsepower, 65-ton Vulcan diesel, and a 50-ton Atlas Car and Manufacturing Company locomotive. Oscar Greene also kept a restored 35-ton GE gas-electric locomotive on the railroad which he worked on restoring in his spare time. In 1976, the company's assets, not counting the Greenes, were "two working locomotives, an engine house, nine-tenths of a mile of straight track, an office and one employee", and it served three industrial customers in Cranston. It was one of the shortest and smallest railroad companies in the United States. A 1977 analysis found that the Warwick Railway was tied with the Mount Vernon Terminal Railroad for the shortest railroad company in the United States.

=== Providence and Worcester ===
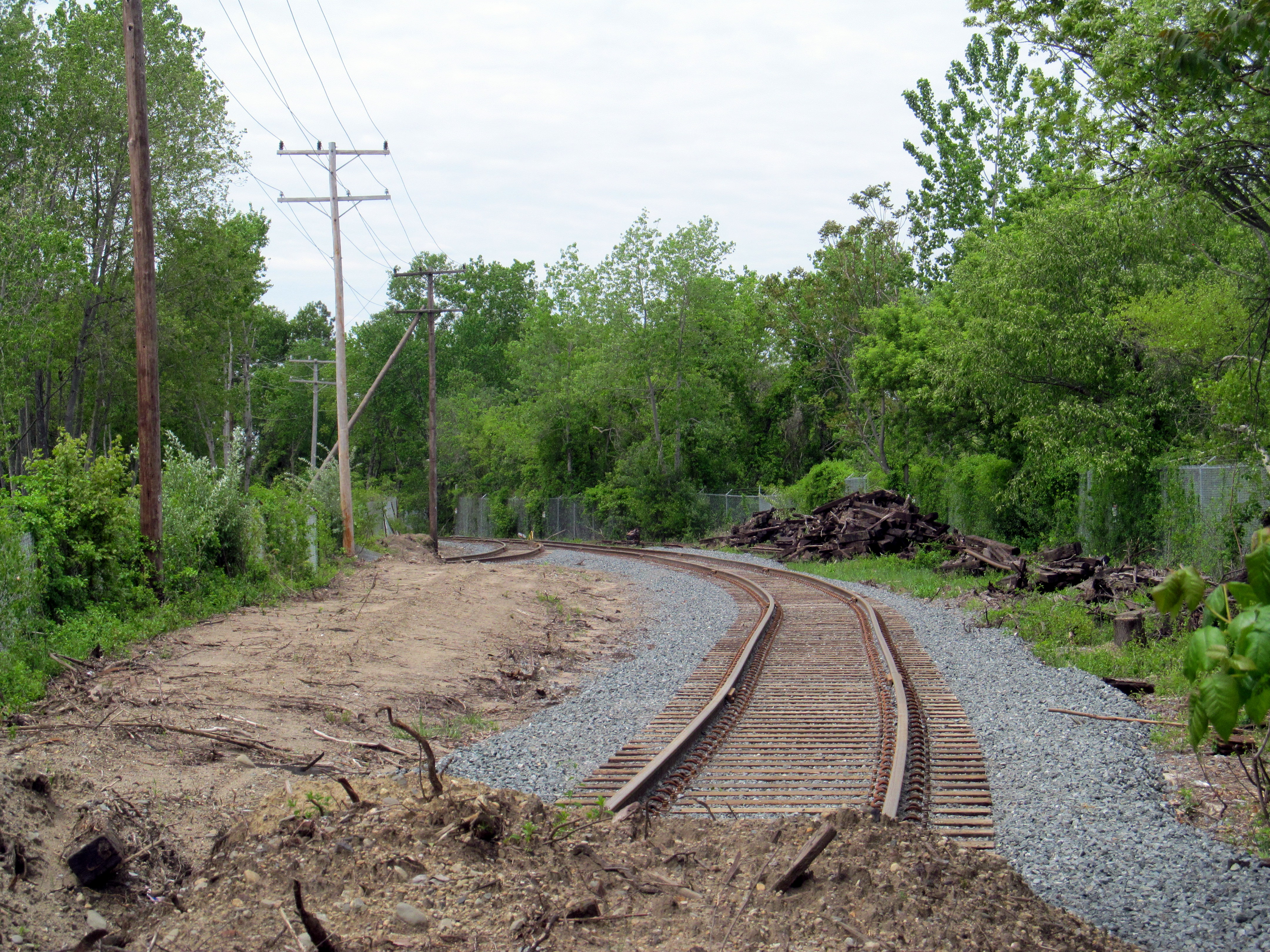
Newly rebuilt tracks in Cranston in 2017, at the present terminus of the former Warwick Railway

In 1979, the Warwick Railway began the process of selling their line to the Providence and Worcester Railroad (P&W). The Interstate Commerce Commission authorized the P&W to take over rail service starting August 14, 1979, citing the Warwick's "economic inability ... to continue operations". P&W formally took over the Warwick Railway in 1982, and designated the line its Warwick Industrial Track. Oscar Greene worked for the P&W as a locomotive engineer until retiring in 1983. Freight service was provided to a chemicals company and a plastics manufacturer until 1999, at which point no customers remained and the line was placed out of service. Following this point, no trains ran and the right of way became overgrown, leading local residents to trim plant growth and plant their own vegetation, including trees and shrubs.

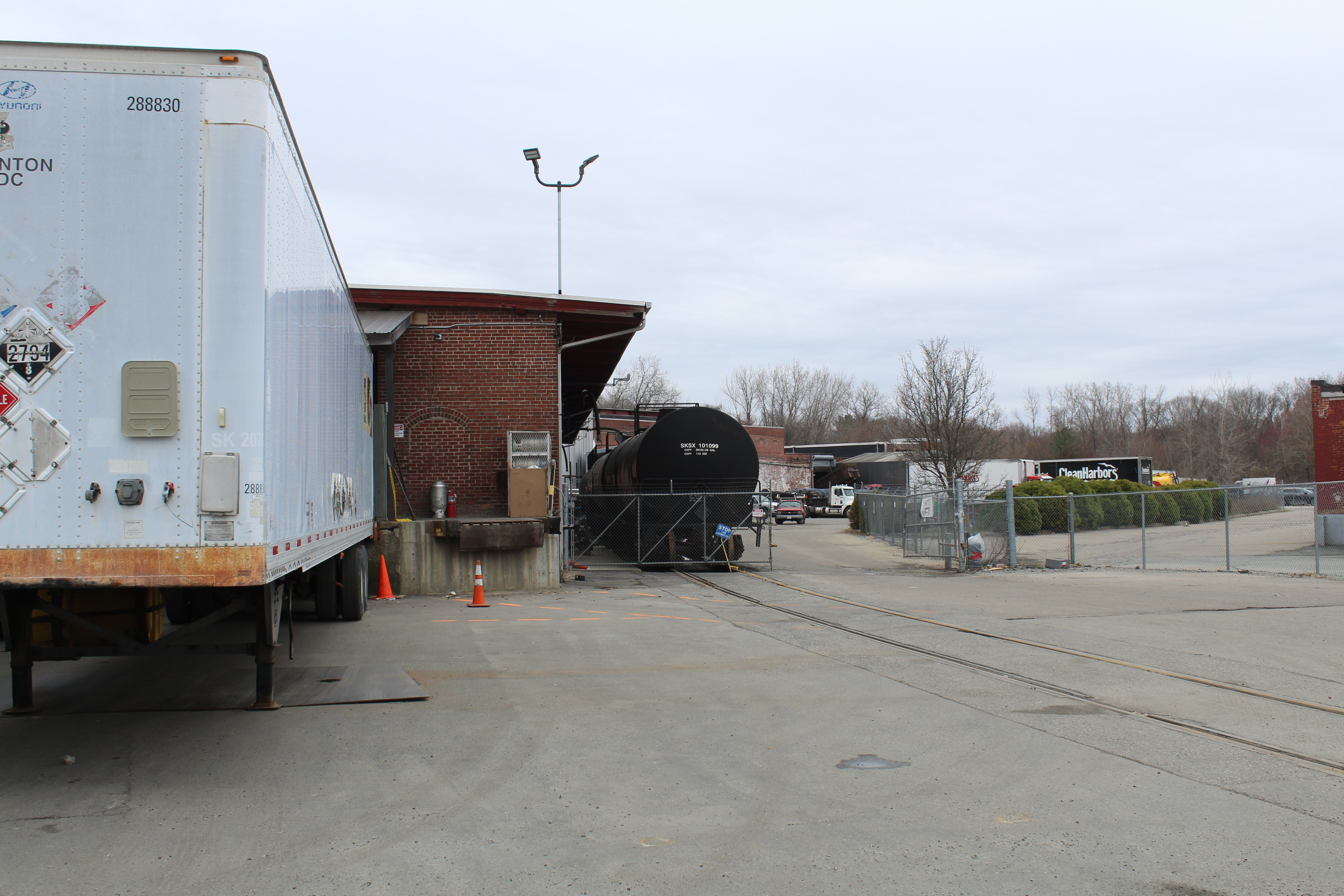
Tank cars being loaded at Clean Harbors in April 2023

In late 2016, Providence and Worcester work crews arrived and began restoring the right of way ahead of a potential return of the tracks to active use, removing all vegetation. This upset local residents, who appealed to the Cranston mayor to intervene; he was unable to do so, as railroad right of ways are regulated by the state and federal governments. Subsequently, representatives from P&W and the prospective customer, a waste oil processing company, attended a meeting with local residents to listen to their concerns about safety and noise. Customer Clean Harbors projected service would run two to three days per week, beginning in early 2017. As of March 2022, the line is indicated as active on P&W's website.

== Historic station listing ==
City	Miles (km)	Name
Cranston	0.0 (0.0)	Cranston (Auburn)
Cranston	1.3 (2.1)	Bellefonte
Warwick	1.8 (2.9)	Silver Hook (Lakewood)
Warwick	2.3 (3.7)	Lakewood (Pawtuxet)
Warwick	3.0 (4.9)	Baker
Warwick	3.7 (5.9)	Spring Green
Warwick	3.9 (6.3)	Hoxsie
Warwick	4.8 (7.7)	Coles
Warwick	5.2 (8.4)	Conimicut
Warwick	5.8 (9.4)	Shawomet Beach
Warwick	6.2 (9.9)	River View
Warwick	6.6 (10.6)	Bayside (Longmeadow)
Warwick	7.2 (11.6)	Rocky Point
Warwick	7.6 (12.2)	Warwick
Warwick	8.9 (14.3)	Oakland Beach
Warwick	9.6 (15.4)	Buttonwoods

== See also ==
- Moshassuck Valley Railroad
- Narragansett Pier Railroad
