= Newport and Wickford Railroad and Steamboat Company =

Railroad in Rhode Island (1871–1909)

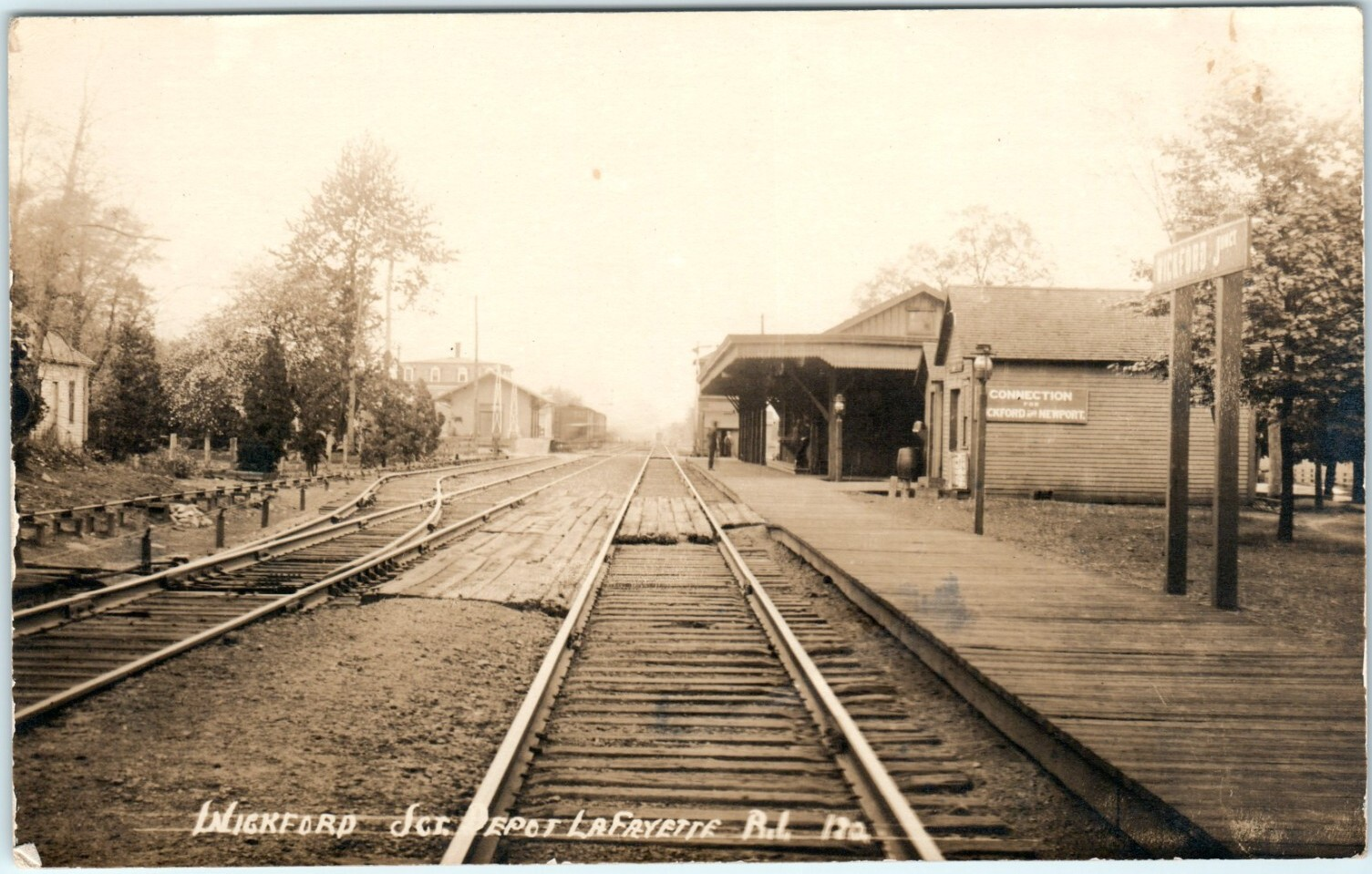
- Wickford Junction station around 1913

Overview
- Dates of operation: 1871–1909
- Successor: New York, New Haven and Hartford Railroad

Technical
- Track gauge: 4 ft 8 1/2 in (1,435 mm) standard gauge
- Length: 3.5 miles (5.6 km)

The Newport and Wickford Railroad and Steamboat Company was a railroad and steamboat operator in Rhode Island. It was first chartered in 1862 as the Wickford Branch Railroad, and intended to connect Wickford Junction station to downtown Wickford, Rhode Island, by rail, and Wickford to Newport, Rhode Island, by steamboat. The company changed its name to the Wickford Railroad in 1864, before adopting its final name in 1870. Construction was completed in 1871, when the railroad began hauling both passengers and freight with a single locomotive and two railroad cars. Steamboats were purchased to connect to Newport. The railroad operated under the control of the New York, Providence and Boston Railroad, but maintained its own corporate identity until a 1909 takeover by the New York, New Haven and Hartford Railroad. Passenger trains and the steamboat service were both ended in October 1925, and the final half a mile to Wickford Landing was abandoned in 1938. The rest of the line was abandoned by the New Haven in 1962.

== History ==
=== Formation and construction ===
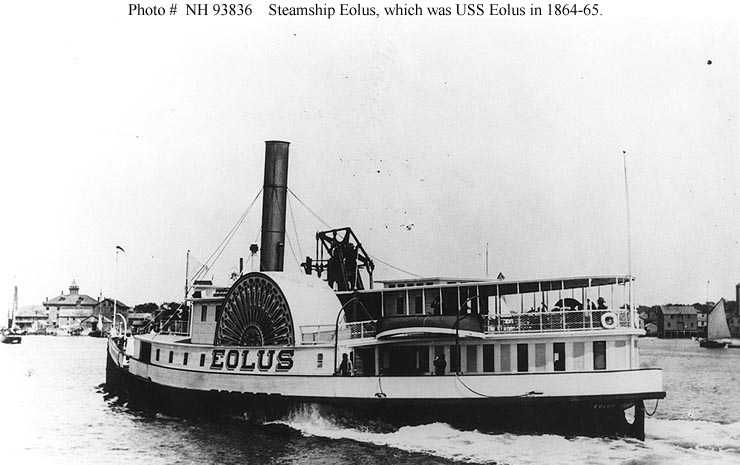
The Eolus in the late 1800s

The New York, Providence and Boston Railroad (known as the Stonington Line) was the first railroad to be built in southern Rhode Island, completed in 1837. The company planned to route their line directly through the coastal village of Wickford, but surveyors were chased out of town by local farmers armed with guns. As a result, the Stonington Line avoided Wickford, passing by three miles (4.8 km) west. By the 1860s, Wickford residents had come to regret rejecting the railroad, and therefore decided to form their own company to connect Wickford to the Stonington Line.

The railroad would also connect to Wickford's port, where steamboats could be run to Newport, Rhode Island, a popular summer destination for wealthy New York City residents. At the time, the connection between trains from New York City and steamboats was in Greenwich, Connecticut. Traveling by ship to Newport from west of Rhode Island meant sailing past Point Judith, an area known for rough seas. An all-rail trip meant traveling via Providence, Rhode Island, and Fall River, Massachusetts, which took a significant amount of time.

The railroad was first chartered in 1862 as the Wickford Branch Railroad, before amending its charter in 1864 and dropping the "branch" from its name. A survey for the line was completed in January 1864, identifying a two-and-a-half-mile (4.0 km) route from the Stonington Line's Wickford depot to Wickford proper. A third charter was granted in 1870 and the company adopted its final name, the Newport and Wickford Railroad and Steamboat Company. Construction was completed in June 1871. The total cost of the railroad and equipment, including a steamboat, was just under $164,000.

=== Independent operations ===
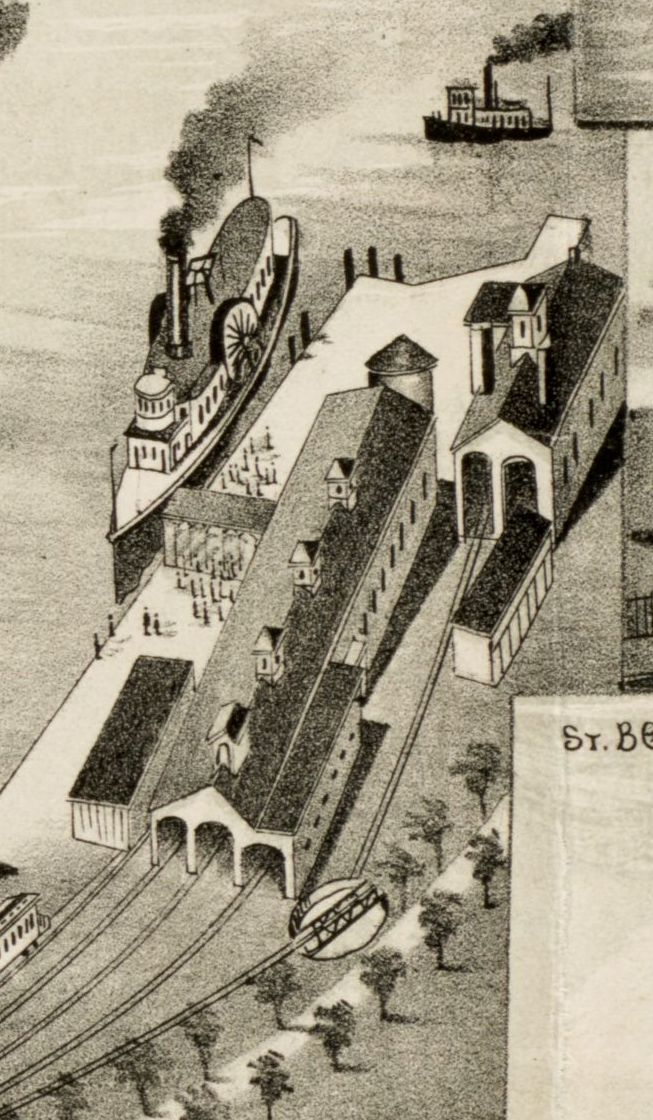
A depiction of Wickford Landing on an 1888 map

In addition to passenger service, the railroad also provided freight service to Wickford's sole mill and several others along its route, plus mail to and from Newport. Trains were initially hauled by a Forney locomotive originally designed for operating on elevated railroads, where turning facilities were unavailable. This was despite turntables being available at both ends of the line. The company's rolling stock included a total of two railroad cars. A pair of side-wheeler steamboats (Eolus and Tockwogh) shuttled passengers and cargo across Narragansett Bay to and from Newport, a trip completed in approximately 75 minutes each way. Tockwogh was destroyed by a fire in April 1893, with Aeolus replaced by the more modern steamboat General.

While an independent company, the Newport and Wickford contracted out train operations to the Stonington Line. For the first few years, trains only ran during the summer, but in 1874 a steam dummy was purchased to enable operations in the quieter winter months.

=== Takeover by the New Haven and abandonment ===
By the start of the 1900s, the Newport and Wickford was in financial trouble. It had new competition from the Sea View Railroad, a trolley line operating between Narragansett Pier and East Greenwich through Wickford. The Sea View's average fare was two cents per trip, compared to the Newport and Wickford's five cents. This attracted the ire of North Kingstown's town council, which sought to have the Newport and Wickford reduce its fares to match the competition. The excesses of the Gilded Age had come to a dramatic conclusion with the Panic of 1893, affecting the Newport and Wickford's primary line of business conveying wealthy travelers to Newport. In October 1908, the New York, New Haven and Hartford Railroad reported that the Newport and Wickford owed it $40,000 in passenger and freight revenues and would no longer allow the latter company any credit. In response, the Newport and Wickford entered receivership.

The Newport and Wickford's financial issues continued, and the following year it was foreclosed on. After publicly stating it had no interest in the Newport and Wickford, the New Haven reversed itself and bought the company at its foreclosure sale in October 1909, claiming it was doing so for the public good and because it was unable to effectively reroute the line's traffic via Providence. The New Haven had previously made statements it was considering building a tunnel underneath Narragansett Bay connecting Providence to Newport, and a story claiming as much was published in The New York Times; such a tunnel would eliminate the primary purpose of the Newport and Wickford. In any event, no tunnel was ever built and this was likely a means of undermining the smaller company. In purchasing the Newport and Wickford, the New Haven struck a deal with the company's bondholders to pay them 60 percent of the value of the bonds; the stockholders of the Newport and Wickford had their shares almost totally wiped out.

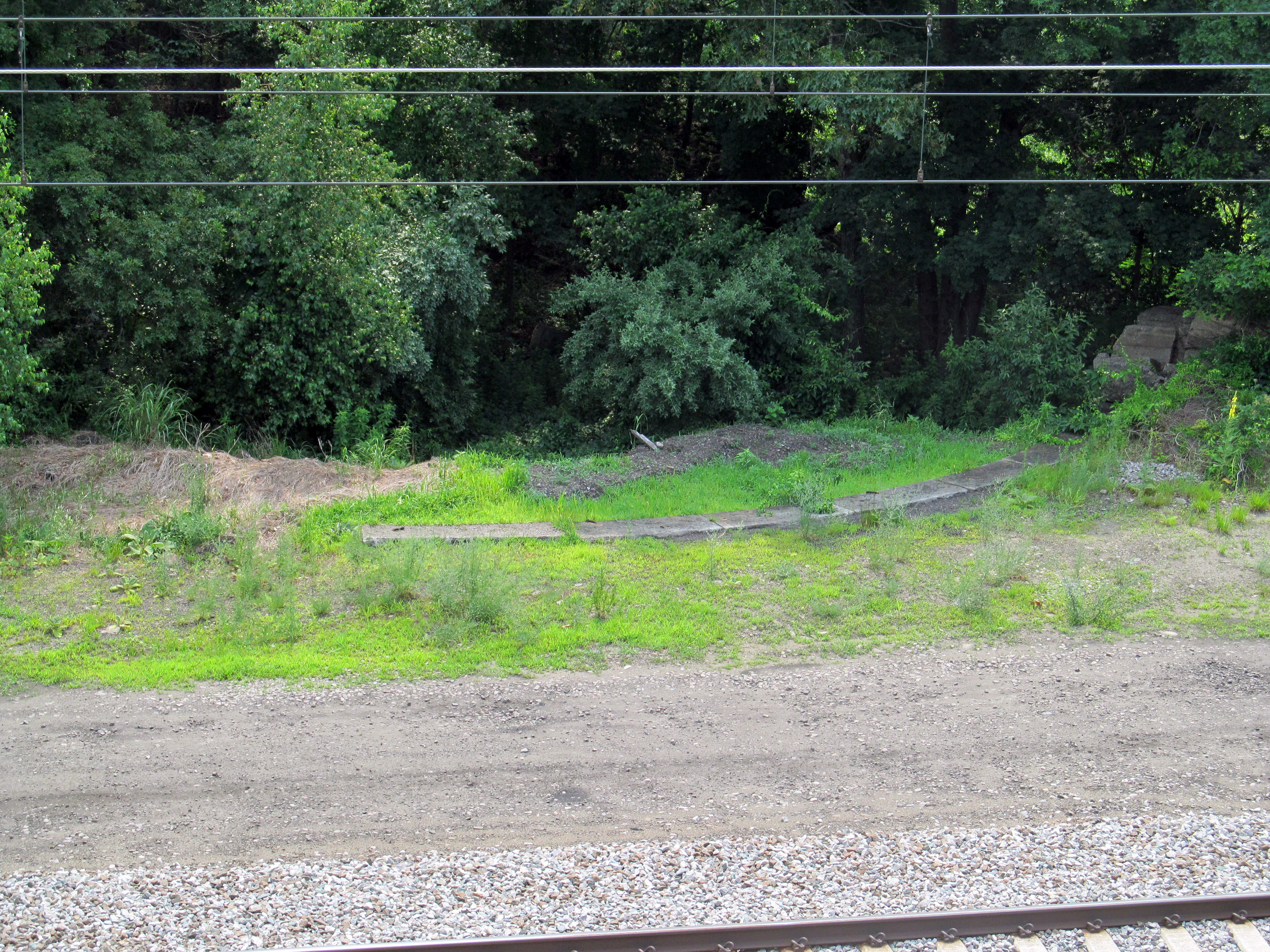
The remains of the railroad's turntable at Wickford Junction in 2012

Passenger services were largely assumed by a railbus in June 1925, although this quickly proved unreliable despite the best efforts of a mechanic sent by the railroad. The New Haven ended passenger service and the steamboat connection in October 1925, despite the city of Newport granting the docking facilities there an exemption from taxation in hopes of service continuing; the General was sold by the New Haven. Passenger service between Wickford Junction and Wickford was assumed by a New Haven Railroad bus. Freight service was run three times a week on the branch; the greatly reduced train volume led to the New Haven receiving permission to remove automatic railroad crossing signals along the branch in 1927.

The tracks to the dock at Wickford Landing were subsequently abandoned in 1938, with the remainder of the line retained as a freight branch serving local industries. The branch saw a temporary increase in usage in support of the construction of Naval Air Station Quonset Point just north of Wickford from the late 1930s and continuing through World War II, though once the base was completed it included its own dedicated rail line connecting to the New Haven's mainline (these tracks survive as the Seaview Railroad). Otherwise, freight service continued until 1962, when the New Haven abandoned all remaining tracks. While much of the physical infrastructure is no longer present, the right-of-way of most of the line was still visible in 2012, including some remaining tracks by Wickford Junction station. A combine coach built for the railroad in 1908 by the Osgood Bradley Car Company is preserved at the Connecticut Trolley Museum in Connecticut. A combination bike rack and sculpture resembling a caboose was built by a local artist in Wickford in 2017 featuring preserved pieces of rail from the railroad.

== Station listing ==
Station	Miles (km)	Comments
Wickford Junction	0 (0)	Junction with the New York, New Haven and Hartford Railroad
Bellevue	1.5 (2.4)	
Wickford	2.5 (4.0)	
Wickford Landing	3.5 (5.6)	
Newport	15.5 (24.9)	Connected to Wickford Landing by steamboat
