= Oakland Beach, Rhode Island =

Neighborhood and beach located in Rhode Island

Coordinates: 41°41′33″N 71°23′56″W

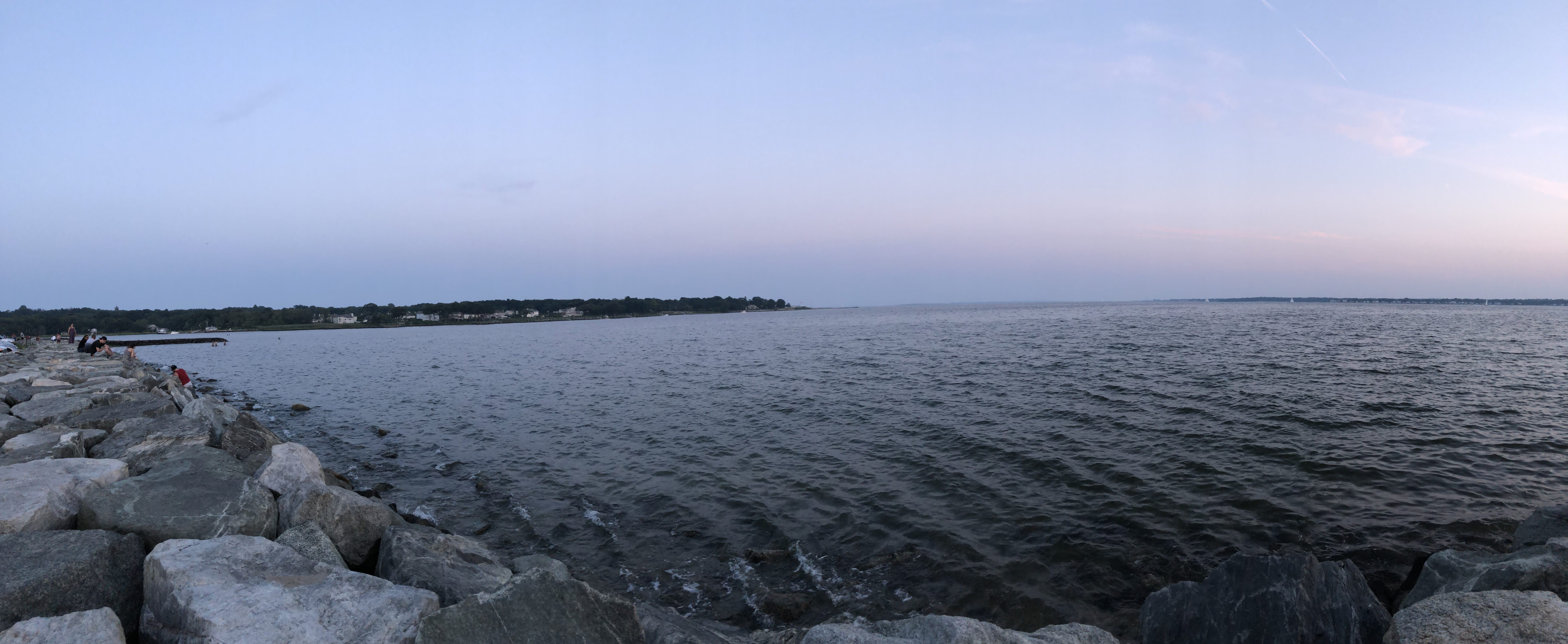
Greenwich Bay from Oakland Beach

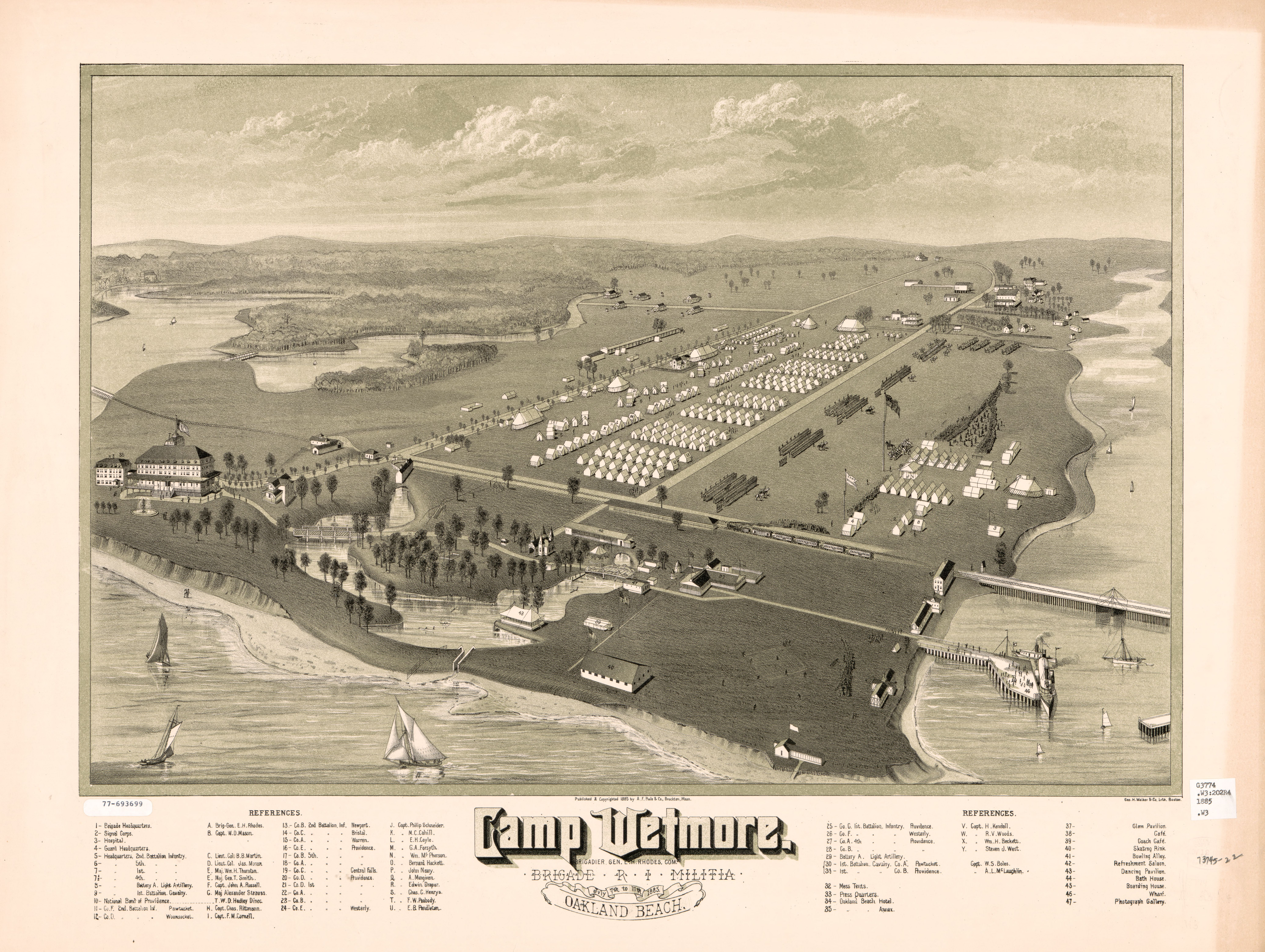
Camp Wetmore, R.I. brigade militia, July 7th to 11th, 1885, Oakland Beach

Oakland Beach is a neighborhood and beach located in the South Central area of Warwick, Rhode Island, on Greenwich Bay, a tributary of Narragansett Bay. In the late 1800s until about 1895 Oakland Beach was the location of Camp Wetmore, the site of a six day annual training encampment of the Rhode Island Militia.

The New England Hurricane of 1938 destroyed much of Oakland Beach. The area never quite recovered, and Hurricane Carol in 1954 added to the area's destruction.
