= Pawtuxet Valley Railroad =

- Pontiac Branch Railroad
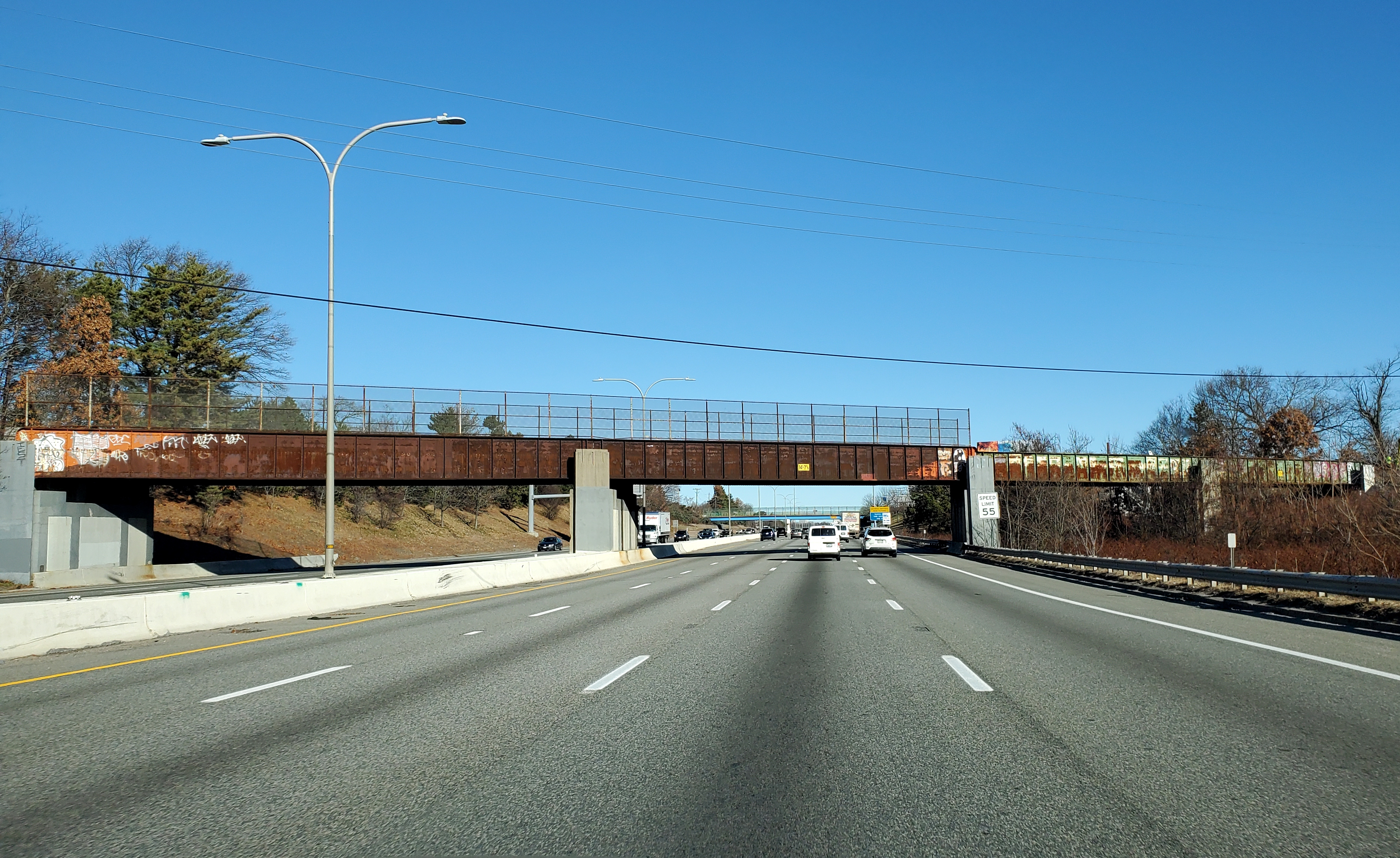
- The Pawtuxet Valley Railroad bridge over I-95 in Cranston, since demolished

Technical
- Track gauge: 4 ft 8 1/2 in (1,435 mm) standard gauge
- Length: 10.5 miles (16.9 km)

The Pawtuxet Valley Railroad, chartered in 1872, was a railroad in Rhode Island. It originally connected River Point to Hope, a total distance of three miles, and was operated as a subsidiary of the Hartford, Providence and Fishkill Railroad. Via the chartering of the Pontiac Branch Railroad in 1875, a nearby line was built from Auburn to Pontiac. The two lines were connected on January 1, 1880, forming a contiguous line operated by the New York, Providence and Boston Railroad. The New York, New Haven and Hartford Railroad became the line's operator when it leased the NYP&B in 1892. Passenger service was discontinued on the line between 1922 and 1925, and in 1924 the original connection between the two ends of the line was abandoned. Declining traffic gradually lead to the abandonment of the entire line. The western portion of the line was abandoned in 1965, while the eastern portion survived to see operation by Penn Central beginning in 1969, followed by the Providence and Worcester Railroad in 1976. The last active portion of the line was discontinued around 1994.

== History ==
In 1906, the New Haven reached an agreement to absorb the Pawtuxet Valley Railroad, ending its corporate existence, with stockholders getting one share of New Haven Railroad stock per share of Pawtuxet Valley stock. This was completed on April 16, 1907.

Upon the construction of Interstate 95 through Cranston in the 1960s, the Pontiac Branch Railroad line in Auburn was elevated over the new highway with a bridge.

The abandoned bridge that formerly carried the Pontiac Branch Railroad over Interstate 95 was demolished in August 2023.
