= United Electric Railways =

Streetcar operator in Providence, Rhode Island, US (1919-1966)

Overview
- Headquarters: Providence, Rhode Island
- Dates of operation: 1921–1951
- Predecessor: Rhode Island Company
- Successor: United Transit Company, Rhode Island Public Transit Authority

The United Electric Railways Company (UER) was the Providence-based operator of the system of interurban streetcars, trolleybuses, and trolley freight in the state of Rhode Island in the early- to mid-twentieth century.

The UER was chartered in 1919, after the previous operator of the streetcar, the Rhode Island Company, went into temporary receivership. The company was placed under the control of the Rhode Island Public Utilities Commission upon inception, in an effort to limit the impact to service in the event of financial difficulties. UER began operations of the consolidated network in 1921, and achieved an all-time high ridership annual of 154 million people in 1923. UER was purchased by the New England Power Company in 1926, and was operated under the UER brand by the Rhode Island Service Company until the system was again reorganized as the United Transit Company in 1951.

The transportation system in Rhode Island was deprivatized in 1966 when the Rhode Island Public Transit Authority (RIPTA) began operations.

== History ==
=== Rhode Island Rail Transit before UER (1865 - 1918) ===
The first iteration of rail-based transit in Rhode Island was the Union Railroad of Providence, a privately owned horsecar company which began operation in 1865. The first electrified trolleys in the state were introduced in Woonsocket in September 1887. The line was not long enough to be a practical means of transportation, and largely served as an amusement ride. Regular electric trolley service began in August 1889 in Newport, and in January 1892 in Providence. The technology quickly spread to the rest of the existing lines, and sparked the creation of several new railway companies, several of which were not separately owned. In 1894, The United Traction and Electric Company (the Traction Company) was formed as a holding company of the different railways by Marsden Perry, Nelson Aldrich and William Roelker. The Traction Company acquired many of the suburban lines, including those running through Cumberland, Pawtuxet Valley, and Barrington and Warren.

By 1902, all lines were electrified. At this point, the Traction Company created the Rhode Island Company (RICo), which subsequently leased the system, still partially operating with the original Union Railroad of Providence name. Due to financial underperformance in its first few years of operations, the stock of RICo was traded frequently, until it was controlled (through a series of intermediaries) by the New York, New Haven and Hartford Railroad by 1907. In addition to providing passenger service, the trolley system also carried trolley freight.

The Providence Cable Tramway Company, which operated cable cars up the steep grade of College Hill, was also operated by the RICo series of holding companies at this time. The cable car was rendered obsolete with the 1914 opening of the trolley-accessible East Side Trolley Tunnel, connecting North Main Street to Thayer Street.

Antitrust laws passed over the next few years forced the New Haven to divest from transit, leaving RICo. lacking the financial support of the larger railroad. RICo was unable to pay off debts, compunded by streetcars began seeing increased competition from jitneys and automobiles. The Rhode Island Company continued operations until 1918, when its debt became too burdensome and the Rhode Island Supreme Court terminated its leases.

=== The United Electric Railways Company (1918 - 1951) ===
UER was chartered in 1919, as many of the prior streetcar systems were consolidated. These included:

- Rhode Island Company lines (except the Providence Danielson Railway Company and the Seaview line)
- United Traction and Electric Company
  - Union Railroad
  - Pawtucket Street Railway
  - RI Suburban
  - Providence Cable Tramway

To prevent future interruption to service for financial reasons, the charter placed the UER under the control of the Public Utilities Commission. The charter was amended on May 5, 1920, stipulating the composition of the board of directors, specifically that two would be appointed by the Governor of Rhode Island and one would be appointed by the Mayor of Providence. The amendment also required the company to pay $1 million for the improvements of its new consolidated system, and set its debt ceiling at $22 million. Measures were proposed to reclassify jitneys as common carriers at this time, but this measure ultimately failed. The unrestricted operation of jitneys rendered several trolley lines unprofitable.

Tracks first installed in 1914 at Exchange Place (known as Kennedy Plaza since 1964) were expanded, forming a major interchange with connections to Union Station by 1920. The UER fully took over operations of the railways in 1921. In 1922, the first trolleybus ran using the trolley's overhead lines. Despite competition from jitneys, the UER saw an all-time peak annual ridership of 154 million in 1923.

In 1926, the UER was acquired by the New England Power Company. The Rhode Island Service Company then took over UER operations, but the system retained its name and branding. With the arrival of the Great Depression, the system suffered from a lack of improvements and service reductions. Buses were further introduced into the system.

Ridership recovered during World War II, due to rations on gasoline, and nearly returned to its 1923 high. By 1948, trolleys had been completely replaced by trolleybuses. Tracks were removed from city streets, and the East Side Trolley Tunnel was reformatted for buses. However, by the early 1950s, ongoing financial difficulties were exacerbated by the commuting public's preference for automobiles over the trolleybuses. As a result, UER was purchased by the United Transit Company (UTC) in 1951, with service was entirely converted by 1952.

=== The end of Rhode Island Streetcars, replacement of UER, Modern day (mid 1940s - today) ===
The relaunch of transit in Rhode Island under the UTC garnered an increase in ridership to 100 million annual riders. The further developments of the highway system, however, slowly eroded this slight recovery. By 1955, all electric buses had been replaced with diesel and gasoline vehicles. The Rhode Island General Assembly created the Rhode Island Public Transit Authority (RIPTA) in 1964, allowing the state to take control of any system whose imminent failure would harm the public good. This function was fulfilled as RIPTA took over UTC operation on July 1, 1966.

All the tracks and most of the infrastructure associated with the trolley/trolleybus network has since been removed. Several of the former trolleys have been preserved by the Shore Line Trolley Museum. Kennedy Plaza remains a central transit hub, and the East Side Trolley Tunnel continues to be used by RIPTA buses. Some infrastructure for the cable tramway remains under Benefit Street.

Many current RIPTA routes mimic those of the original interurban network.

In 2014, the City of Providence and RIPTA were awarded a $13 million TIGER VI grant for the construction of a streetcar linking Rhode Island Hospital to downtown Providence and College Street via the East Side Trolley Tunnel. However, due to concerns that the such a line would be useful to a relatively small population and a lack of public support, the project was cancelled. In 2016, the grant was approved for reallocation to the construction of RIPTA's Downtown Connector.

== Equipment ==
The UER inherited the rolling stock used by the Rhode Island Company, but also purchased new trolleys and trolleybuses. Rail cars were manufactured by Wason, Laconia, Brill, American Car & Foundry, Newburyport, and Jackson & Sharp, amongst others. Cars were painted green and cream until 1928, at which point the color scheme was changed to yellow and cream. In 1940, 50 cars were sold to Capital Transit.

Several of the trolleybuses and buses purchased by the UER were made by Pullman and GMC, which were inherited by the UTC. Some were later taken out of service, and some were converted to diesel. In the early- and mid-1950s, several UER buses were sold to transit agencies in Cleveland, Halifax, Boston, and Winnipeg.
