= Hope Village Historic District =

Historic district in Rhode Island, United States

- U.S. National Register of Historic Places
- U.S. Historic district
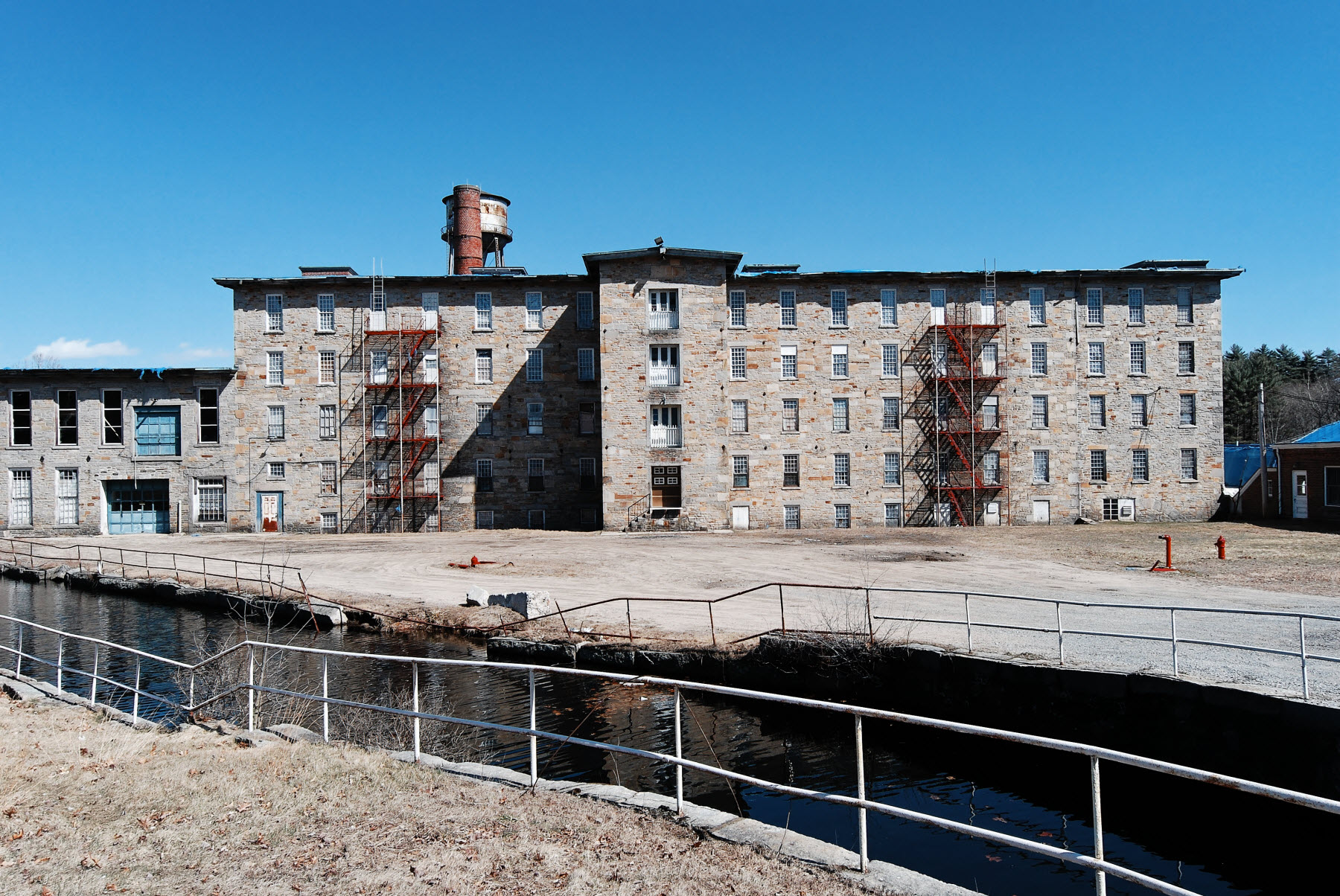
- Hope Mill in 2008

- Location within Rhode Island Location within the United States
- Location: Roughly bounded by the Pawtuxet R., Hope Furnace Rd., Hope Mill Pond, North Rd., White Ln., Harrington and Potter Sts., Hope, Rhode Island
- Coordinates: 41°44′1″N 71°33′51″W
- Area: 114 acres (46 ha)
- Built: 1765
- Architect: Stone & Carpenter; Monahan & Meikle; Oliver W. Fontaine
- Architectural style: Late Victorian, Mid 19th Century Revival
- NRHP reference No.: 95000918
- Added to NRHP: August 08, 1995

The Hope Village Historic District is a historic rural mill settlement within Hope Village in Scituate, Rhode Island. Hope Village is located on a bend in the North Pawtuxet River in the southeastern corner of Scituate. Industrial activity has occurred in Hope Village since the mid-eighteenth century. Surviving industrial and residential buildings in the Historic District date back to the early 19th century. The village center sits at junction of Main Street (Rhode Island Route 115) and North Road (Rhode Island Route 116). Hope Village radiates out from the center with houses on several smaller side streets in a compact configuration. Currently there is little commercial or industrial activity in Hope Village and none in the Historic District. The present stone mill building on the south side of Hope Village was built in 1844 by Brown & Ives of Providence, expanded in 1871 and modified in 1910. Approximately one quarter of the village's current housing stock was built as mill worker housing by various owners of Hope Mill.

== Hope Furnace ==
An iron furnace called the Hope Furnace was constructed in 1766, shortly after the discovery of iron ore nearby in 1765. The factory produced household goods and pig iron, and received a contract to produce cannon for the Rhode Island General Assembly to manufacture cannon for use in the American Revolutionary War. The factory eventually produced 270 cannon. Hope Furnace stopped production around 1801, and the property was sold to Silvanus Hopkins in 1806.

== Hope Mill ==
In 1806, the Hope Cotton Factory Company built a textile mill building along the Pawtuxet River, southeast of the site of the Hope Furnace in a settlement that later came to be called Hope Village. The mill was constructed out of wood. Between 1806 and 1844 the mill buildings passed through several hands. In 1844, the mill buildings burned down and the buildings were replaced by a large, four-story gabled roof stone building with a belfry tower on its west face and roof dormers by the Providence firm of Brown and Ives, which had purchased the mill property in 1844. Around 1900, a 40,000 square foot one story brick mill building was added to the south of the stone mill buildings. The gabled roof of the stone mill building was replaced by a flat roof and a fifth floor was added to the original stone mill.

The Hope Mill buildings were used to weave textile until 2007. The last textile manufacturing occupant of the mill was Just-A-Stretch, a weaver of elastic fabrics.

Between 2016 and 2019 the roofs and walls of the brick building and roofs of several stone mill buildings collapsed. The Hope mill property has been in receivership since 2008 (except for the period of January to August 2010) and has been badly neglected since 2010.

In August 2023, the town of Scituate voted to tear down the mill by the end of the year, due to years of decay to the structure. It'll be completely demolished by 2024.

== Hope Village ==
After the 1844 mill purchase by Brown and Ives, several houses were built in the periphery of the mill property to house executives of the Hope Mill. In 1874, a church was built next to the mill. A library was established in the basement of the church. Thirteen double-tenement houses were also built for employees on Mill Street north of the mill on land originally owned by the Hope Furnace.

By the early 1880s Hope Village had established itself as a bustling village at the terminus of the Pawtuxet Valley Railroad. The Pawtuxet Valley Railroad began operation in Hope Village in 1874. Several shops opened in Hope Village. The rail line in Hope was removed in the 1950s.

The district was listed on the National Register of Historic Places on August 8, 1995.

== See also ==
- National Register of Historic Places listings in Providence County, Rhode Island
