= Providence Cable Tramway Company =

Defunct American cable car line in Providence, Rhode Island

The Providence Cable Tramway Company built and operated a cable car line in Providence, Rhode Island. It was incorporated in 1884 and eventually absorbed into the Union Railroad. Construction began in late 1888 and revenue service began on January 1, 1890. The line provided access between the East Side and Market Square: prior to this point, College Hill was too steep for other transit systems. The cable line only ran until 1895, at which point the line was electrified. Various underground counterweight systems were used to help train cars ascent the steep hill with the assistance of cars descending it. This system remained in use until 1915, at which point the East Side Trolley Tunnel, running from South Main Street to Thayer Street was opened. That tunnel provided a small enough grade that ordinary trolleys could ascend without assistance, rendering the previous systems obsolete.
