= Seaview Transportation Company =

Railroad company in Rhode Island

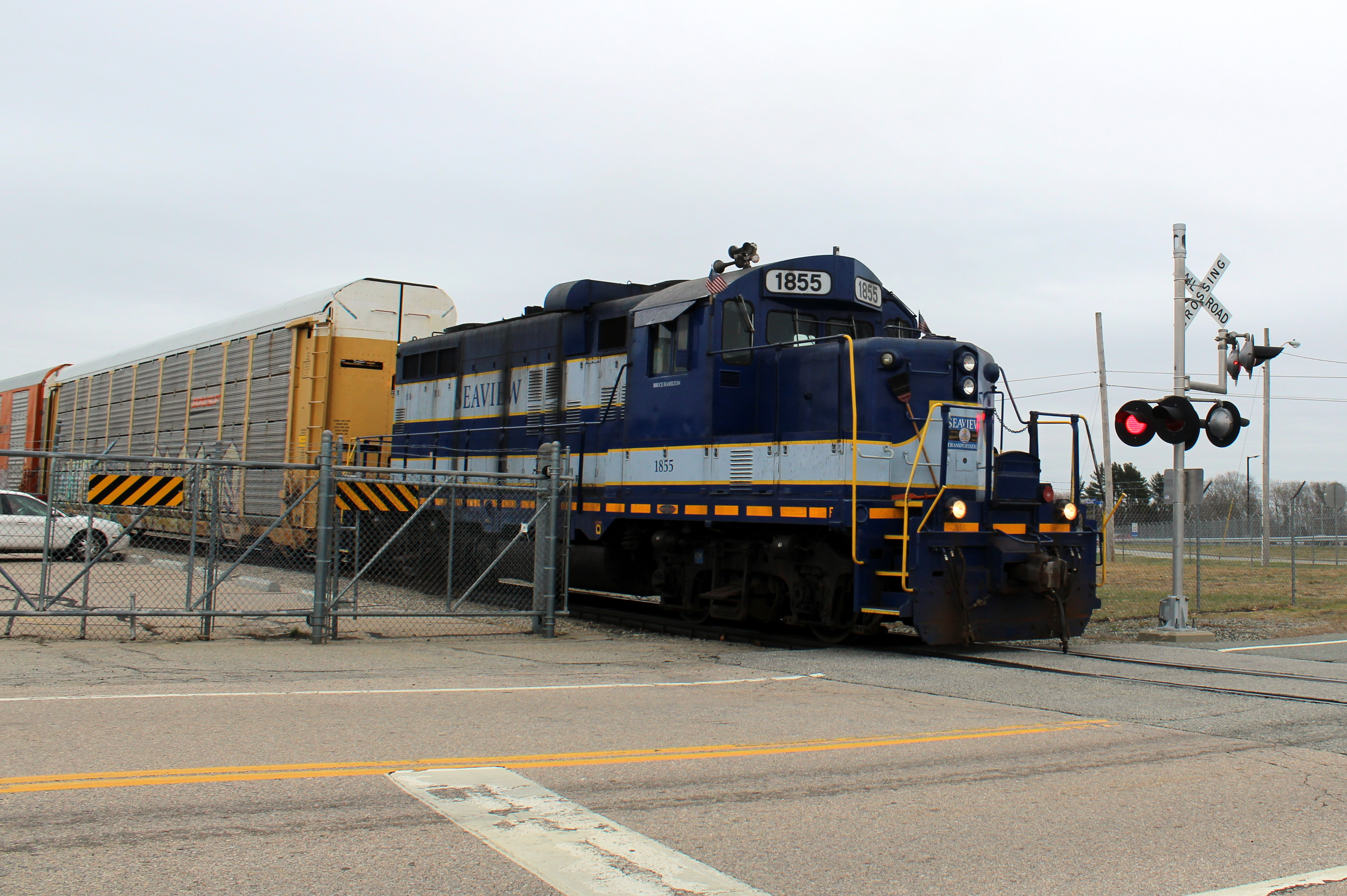
- Seaview Railroad 1855 pulling autoracks in April 2023

Overview
- Headquarters: Davisville, Rhode Island
- Reporting mark: SVTX
- Locale: North Kingstown, Rhode Island
- Dates of operation: 1978–

Technical
- Track gauge: 4 ft 8 1/2 in (1,435 mm) standard gauge
- Track length: 14 miles (23 km)

Other
- Website: https://seaviewrr.com/

The Seaview Transportation Company, also known as the Seaview Railroad, is a terminal railroad in North Kingstown, Rhode Island that serves the port of Davisville and surrounding industries. The railroad began operations in 1978 on trackage that formerly served Quonset Point Air National Guard Station.

Seaview is a sister company to the Newport and Narragansett Bay Railroad, a heritage railroad in Rhode Island.

== History ==
=== Formation ===
The location where the railroad operates today was formerly a United States military installation, known as Naval Air Station Quonset Point. An extensive military railroad with 45 miles (72 km) of track served the facility, run by the United States Navy. The base was significantly downsized in 1974, leaving only Quonset Point Air National Guard Station on the site. With the departure of the navy, the Seaview Transportation Company was formed between 1978 and 1979 to continue rail service for civilian customers in the area.

=== Early years (1978 to 1990) ===
In the company's first year, it had just two customers and handled 400 carloads.

=== Expansion and growth (1990 to 2000) ===
In the late 1990s, the Rhode Island Department of Transportation provided funding and support for Seaview's infrastructure, helping the company rebuild tracks and expand operations. As a result of RIDOT's support, the railroad greatly increased service.

=== Into the 21st century (2000 to present) ===
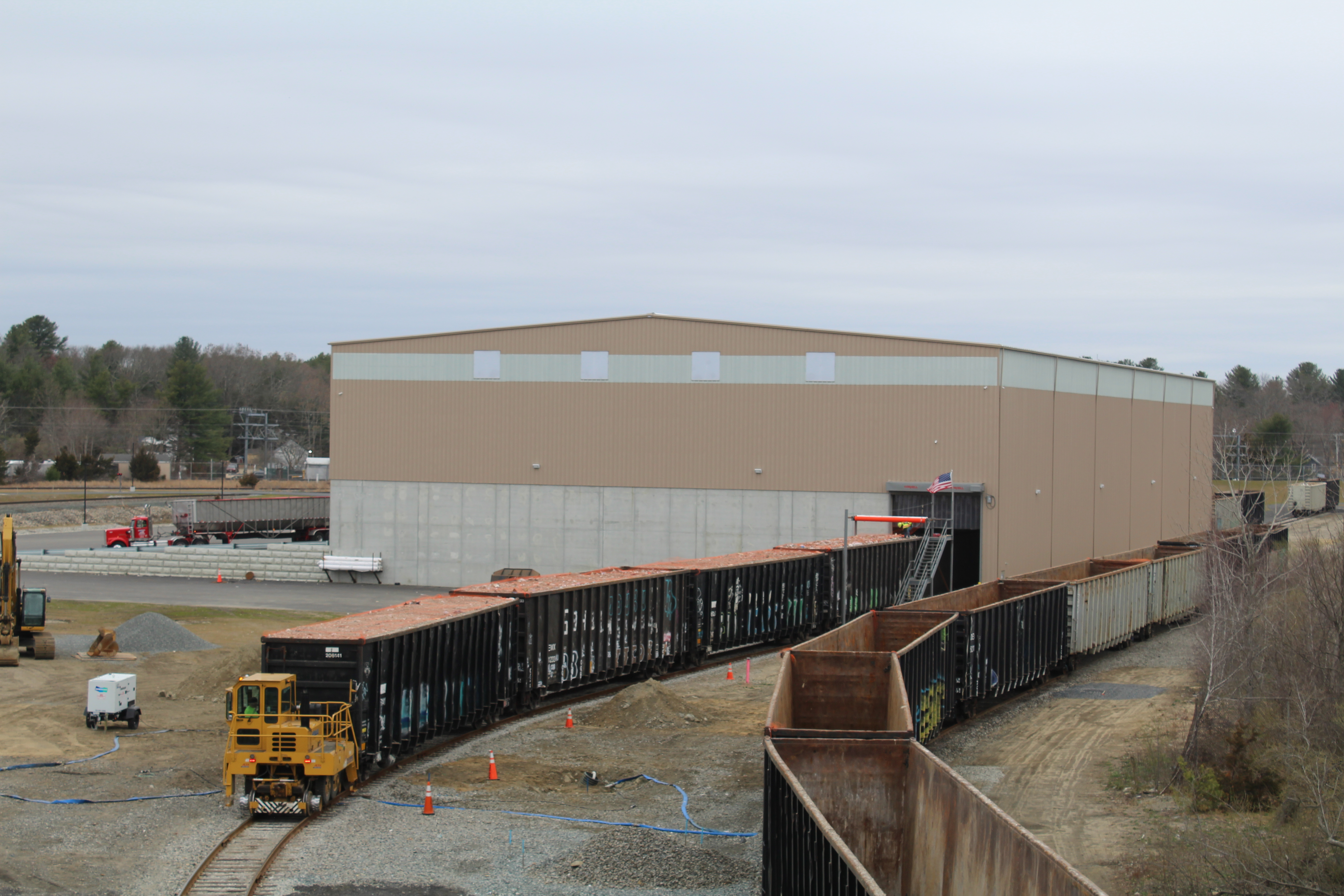
A Trackmobile moves loaded railcars at a construction debris transfer station at Quonset Point connected to the railroad

The railroad imported 41,797 automobiles by rail in 2011. Automobiles arrive at the port by both rail from the Midwestern United States and cargo ships.

In 2012, Eric Moffett purchased Seaview from its previous owner. Moffett prioritized expanding the railroad's services and rebuilding disused trackage. In the early 2010s, the state of Rhode Island invested $5.5 million to repair all of Seaview's 14 miles (23 km) of track. By 2015, Seaview was handling over 6,800 cars per year, an increase from 5,000 in 2012. In 2017, the railroad surpassed 7,000 carloads, triple the number it was carrying in the early 1990s. The railroad reported 7,513 carloads hauled in 2023, for an average of approximately 60 arriving and leaving per day.

15 Amtrak AEM-7s arrived at Seaview for storage after their 2016 retirement amid possible interest by the MBTA. When the MBTA decided against electrification in the short term, Seaview began selling the units for scrap. One AEM-7 was instead purchased by a preservation group in 2024.

Citing a need for more storage capacity for railcars, Seaview began constructing a new railyard in October 2021 with funding from the United States Department of Transportation and the Quonset Development Corporation. Mill Creek yard, which includes two new tracks for storage of up to 58 railcars, was completed in July 2022. Ground was broken on a new $4.3 million engine house for the railroad in September 2022, and a new $1.15 million track directly connecting Mill Creek yard to the Northeast Corridor was opened near the end of 2023. The new engine house opened in July 2024 and provided additional facilities for railcar maintenance and storage.

== Operations ==
=== Freight service ===
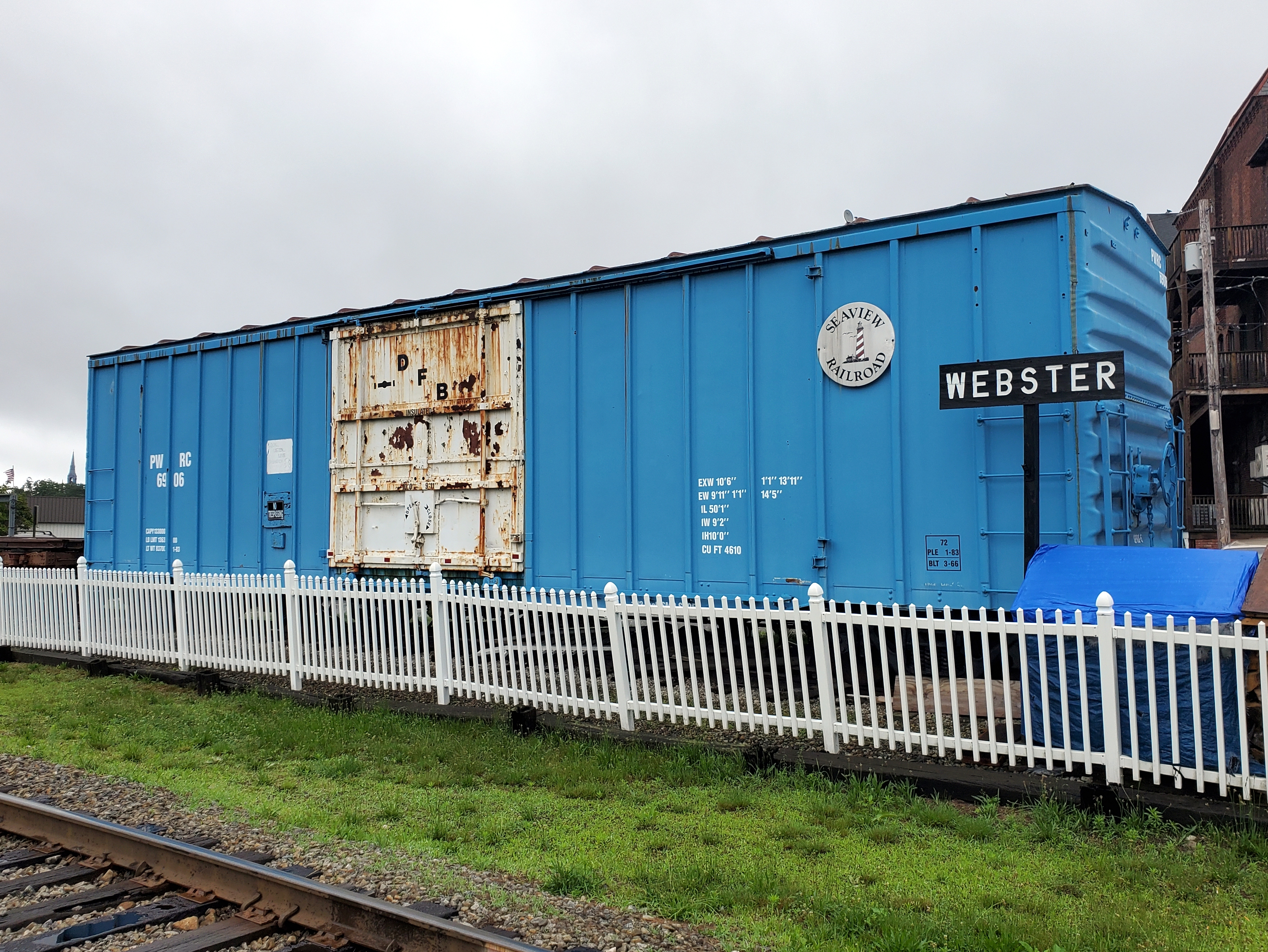
A retired Seaview Railroad boxcar at the Providence and Worcester Railfan Club Museum in Webster, Massachusetts, seen in July 2021. The boxcar bears P&W reporting marks.

Seaview serves a number of customers within the Quonset Business Park, which was established in the area formerly occupied by the Naval Air Station. The railroad's two biggest customers are automobile importer North American Distribution and Toray Plastics. Other customers include companies in the lumber, food, steel products, and granite industries. As of 2016, Seaview had a total of nine customers.

The railroad is connected to the Northeast Corridor, where it interchanges freight with Providence and Worcester Railroad.

Seaview's headquarters and offices are located in North Kingstown's Davisville neighborhood. The company's locomotives are based here as well. As of January 2024, the railroad has three operational locomotives and a fourth under restoration.

The railroad typically operates five days a week, as needed by the industries it serves.

=== Passenger service ===
While primarily a freight railroad, Seaview first started offering limited passenger service in 2016, bringing passengers between Providence and T. F. Green Airport stations and the Quonset Air Show, an annual event held at the Quonset Point ANG Station. This service, named "Trains to Planes," continued in 2017, when it transported a total of 4,200 passengers to and from the air show. The company has expressed interest in partnering with Rhode Island Fast Ferry to transport passengers to the ferry terminal in Quonset on special occasions and weekends.

=== Work with MBTA ===
Seaview Railroad provides repair services and equipment storage for the MBTA. Seaview's owner Eric Moffett told a local newspaper in 2016, “If we’re able to help support the MBTA, we maybe, in the future, help increase service in the Northeast Corridor.”
