= Auburn, Rhode Island =

Neighborhood in Rhode Island, United States

Coordinates: 41°46′26″N 71°25′40″W

Auburn is an urban neighborhood in the east-central part of Cranston, Rhode Island.

The village contains the Auburn Branch of the Cranston Public Library.
