= Wickford Junction station =

Railway station in North Kingstown, RI

Wickford Junction
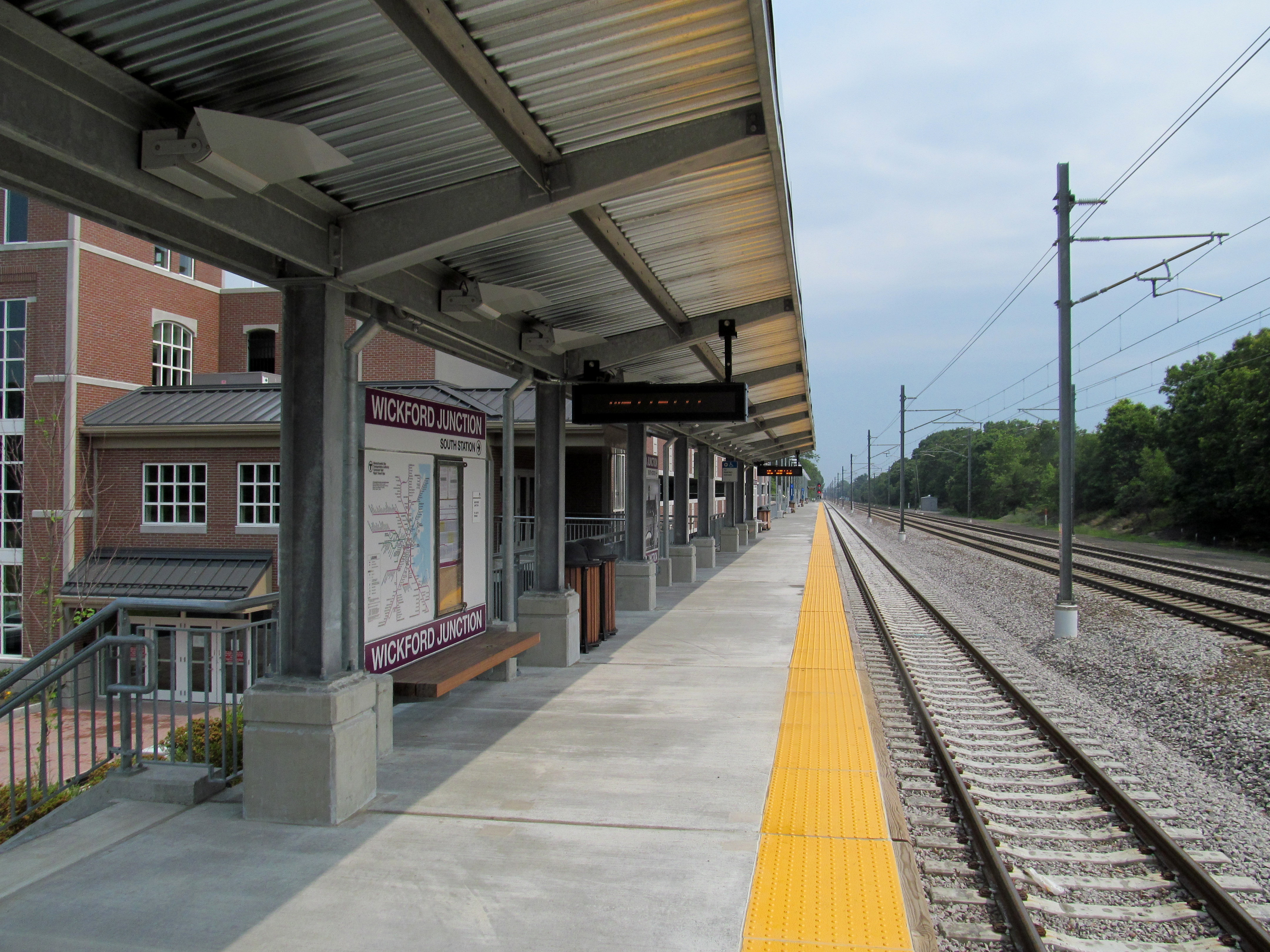
- Platform at Wickford Junction in June 2012

General information
- Location: 1011 Ten Rod Road; North Kingstown, Rhode Island
- Coordinates: 41.5808°N 71.4914°W
- Owner: RIDOT
- Line: Amtrak Northeast Corridor
- Platforms: 1 side platform
- Tracks: 3 (two main and one platform siding)
- Connections: RIPTA: 14, 65x, 66

Construction
- Parking: 1,100 spaces (free)
- Cycle facilities: 20 spots (free)
- Accessible: Yes

Other information
- Fare zone: 10

History
- Opened: First station: 1844; Second station: April 23, 2012
- Closed: October 1, 1981 (former station)
- Rebuilt: 1871, 1887, c. 1890
- Former names: Wickford (1844–1871)

Passengers
- 2024: 157 (weekday average daily boardings)

Services
Preceding station	MBTA	Following station
Terminus	Providence/Stoughton Line	T. F. Green Airport toward South Station
Former services
Preceding station	Amtrak	Following station
Kingston toward New Haven	Beacon Hill Closed 1981	East Greenwich toward Boston South
Preceding station	Penn Central	Following station
Kingston toward Westerly	Westerly–Providence local 1971-1979	East Greenwich toward Providence
Preceding station	New York, New Haven and Hartford Railroad	Following station
Kingston toward New Haven	Shore Line	East Greenwich toward Boston
Location

Wickford Junction station is a commuter rail station located in North Kingstown, Rhode Island, United States. It is the southern terminus of the MBTA Commuter Rail Providence/Stoughton Line and serves as a park and ride location for commuters to Providence and Boston. The station consists of a single high-level side platform on a stub-end siding next to the Northeast Corridor mainline.

The first station at the site opened in 1844. In 1870, the Newport and Wickford Railroad and Steamboat Company was opened from the station to Wickford Landing, where it connected with steamships to Newport, Rhode Island. The station was rebuilt in 1871, expanded in 1887, and rebuilt again around 1890 after a fire. Branch service ended in 1925, but the station remained open until 1981. A new station and parking garage opened on the same site on April 23, 2012, as part of the South County Commuter Rail project, which also included the new T. F. Green Airport station.

== History ==
=== Former station ===
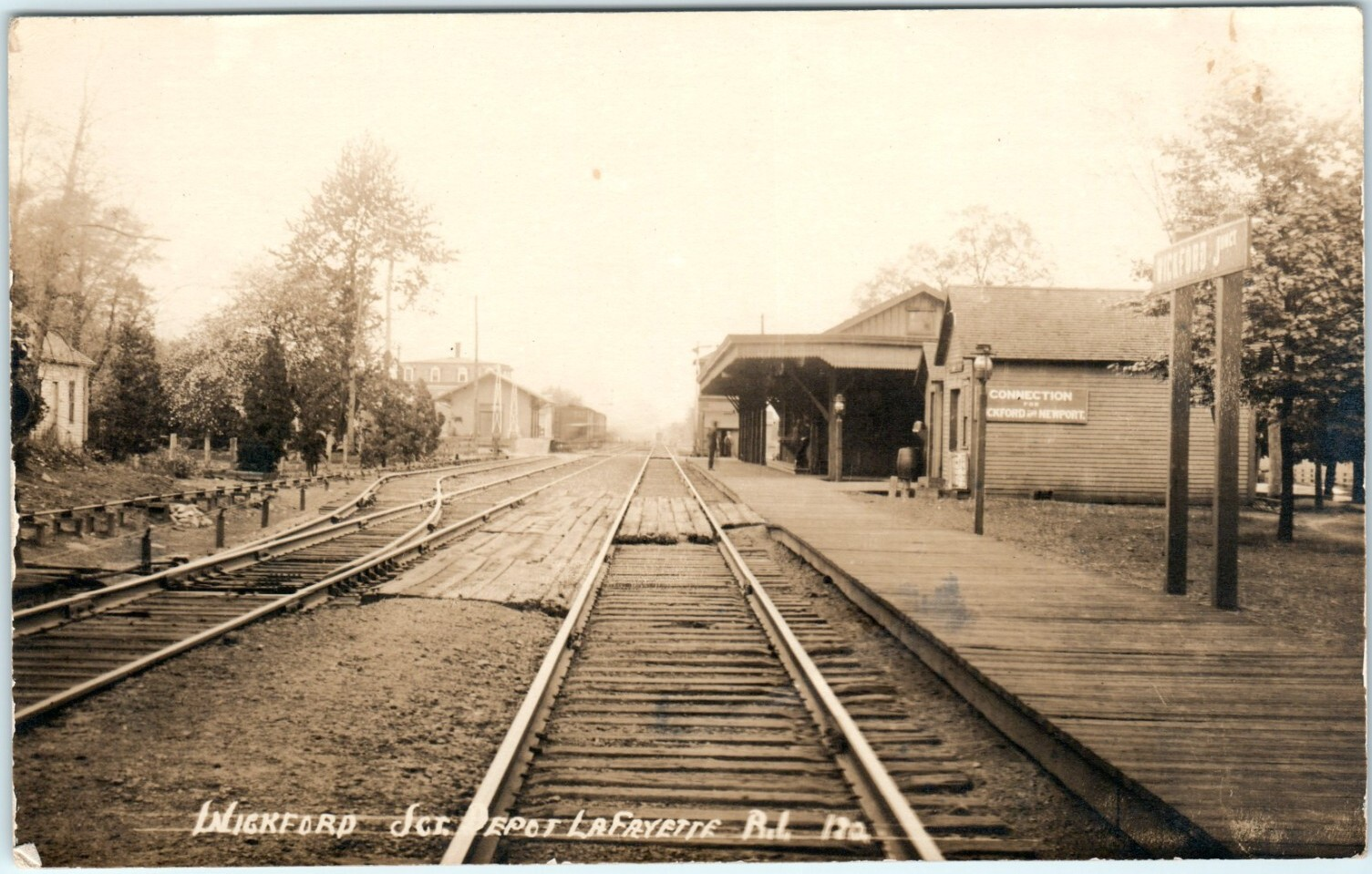
Wickford Junction station around 1913

In 1844, seven years after the Rhode Island section of the New York, Providence and Boston Railroad opened, a small station was placed at Wickford. The Newport and Wickford Railroad and Steamboat Company opened in 1870 as a branch from the mainline to Wickford Landing, where wealthy riders would board steamships to the resorts and summer homes of Newport, Rhode Island. A new station named Wickford Junction was built in 1871 at a cost of $8,000; a $3,500 addition was added sixteen years later. The station burned around 1890 and was replaced by a smaller structure. Passenger service on the branch ended in 1925, though some mainline service continued to stop.

The station building was torn down in 1969 as rail service declined, leaving just the stone foundation, which was later filled with gravel. The pedestrian overpass was moved in 1971 to Route 128 station, where it remained until Route 128 station was rebuilt in 2000. The station, by then just bare platforms, was served by a single New London-Providence round trip (cut to Westerly-Providence by Penn Central on November 22, 1971). The commuter train was discontinued on June 3, 1977. Amtrak's New Haven-Boston Beacon Hill began service on April 30, 1978, including a stop at Wickford Junction. The Beacon Hill was discontinued on October 1, 1981.

The Wickford Landing branch's right-of-way is still extant, as are the remains of a turntable about 700 feet (200 m) north of Ten Rod Road. The state is considering building a bikeway along the right-of-way to connect the Wickford town center with the Wickford Junction development and station.

=== Modern station ===
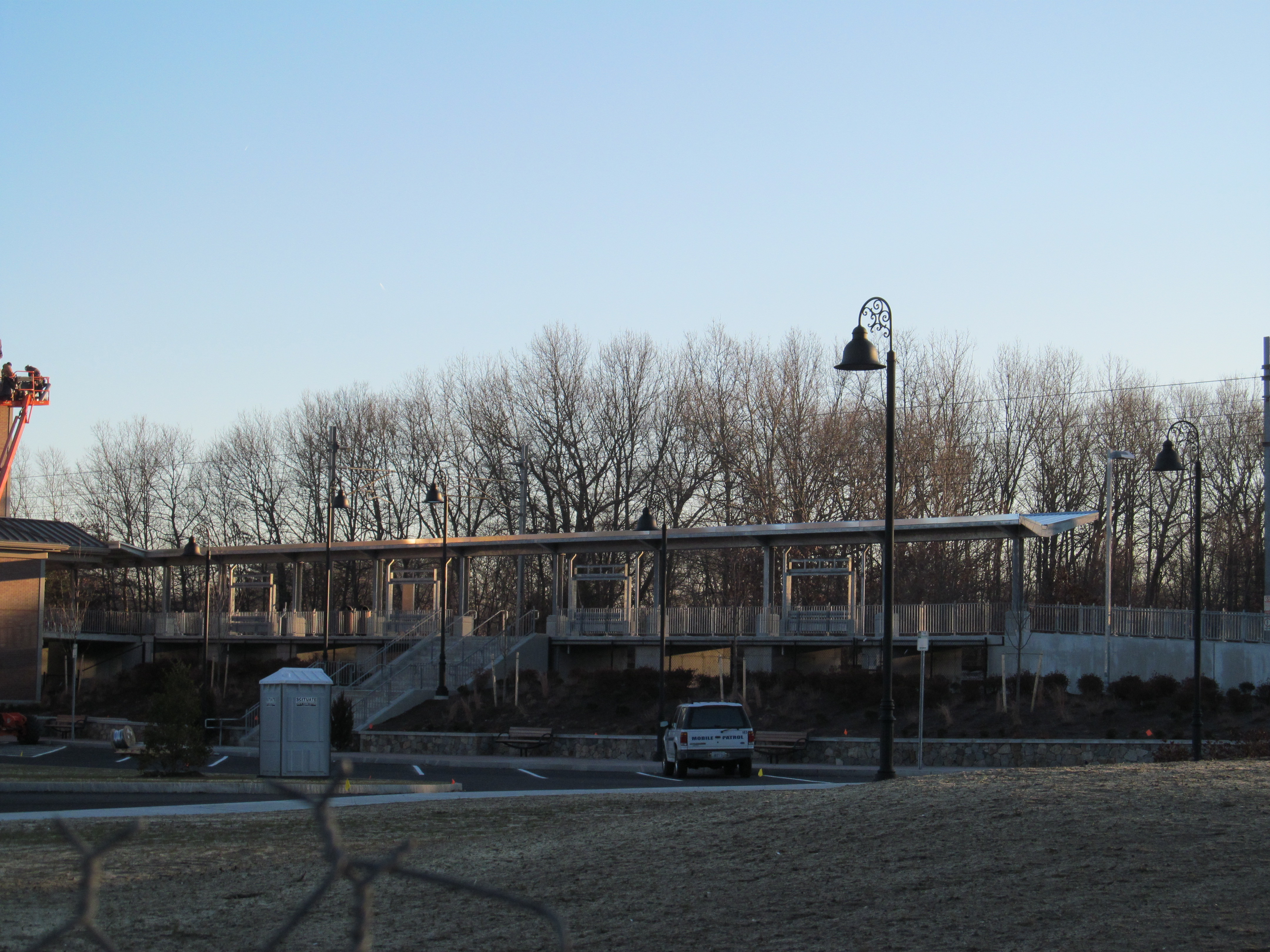
The station under construction in January 2012

After Beacon Hill service ended in 1981, some residents proposed a new station and the restoration of service. Bob Coie, a local builder, had bought a strip of land along the tracks in 1959 and acquired a large parcel along their west side in 1982. In 1985, he convinced the town to upzone the land for commercial use with the intention of eventually building a "pre-planned business district" and commuter rail station there. A state study of rail corridors was completed in 1994 and the Northeast Corridor was designated as the highest-priority line for commuter service to Providence. An addendum in 1995, assuming a quick start to operations, projected that daily ridership from Wickford would be 2,869 in 2000 and 3,386 in 2020. An operations plan was released in 2001, and environmental assessment was completed in 2003.

By November 2006, the station and associated track work was expected to cost $43.7 million, of which $24.99 million would be Federal Transit Administration New Starts funding. The station received a total of $59 million in federal funds, including the $24.99 million from New Starts and $4.35 million in stimulus funds. In late 2009, the State of Rhode Island spent $3.2 million to purchase 350,000 square feet (33,000 m^{2}) of land for the station and parking garage, with hopes that it could be in service in 2011.

Ground was broken for the new station on August 18, 2010. Primary construction work on the station platform and garage was completed on time and under budget in December 2011, and a test train was run to the station in March 2012. The station opened on April 23, 2012. A major part of the modern station is the four-story parking garage, which was modeled after the nearby Lafayette Mill. The garage includes an indoor waiting room—rare in the MBTA system—and a small coffee/snack shop. An 8-foot (2.4 m)-tall bronze sculpture celebrating the history of rail service at Wickford Junction was completed in October 2015.

=== Ridership ===
Ridership at Wickford Junction has been far below projections, some of which had assumed that transit-oriented development would be constructed at the station. Daily boardings were projected to reach 3,544 in 2025 according to the 1995 analysis. This was reduced to 1,669 by 2020 in the 2003 Environmental Assessment, but raised again to 3,386 by 2020 in a 2005 analysis.

Initial ridership in May 2012 was 130 inbound riders per day, of whom 80 percent rode to Providence and 20 percent to Boston. Ridership increased to 150 riders per day by early June and to 175 daily by February 2014.

Ridership averaged 292 daily boardings in the first quarter of 2017. For the second half of 2017, the state offered free intrastate rides in an attempt to promote the under-utilized T.F. Green Airport and Wickford Junction stations. The six-month promotion was expected to cost about $102,000. Ridership increased by 50% within the first month of the promotion. However, the station saw only 235 daily boardings in a 2018 count and 157 in a 2024 count.

As of 2017 the station only has weekday service, but planners hope to add weekend service eventually. Previous official discussions about adding weekend service to T. F. Green Airport and Wickford Junction took place in 2014.

=== Bus operations and consolidation ===
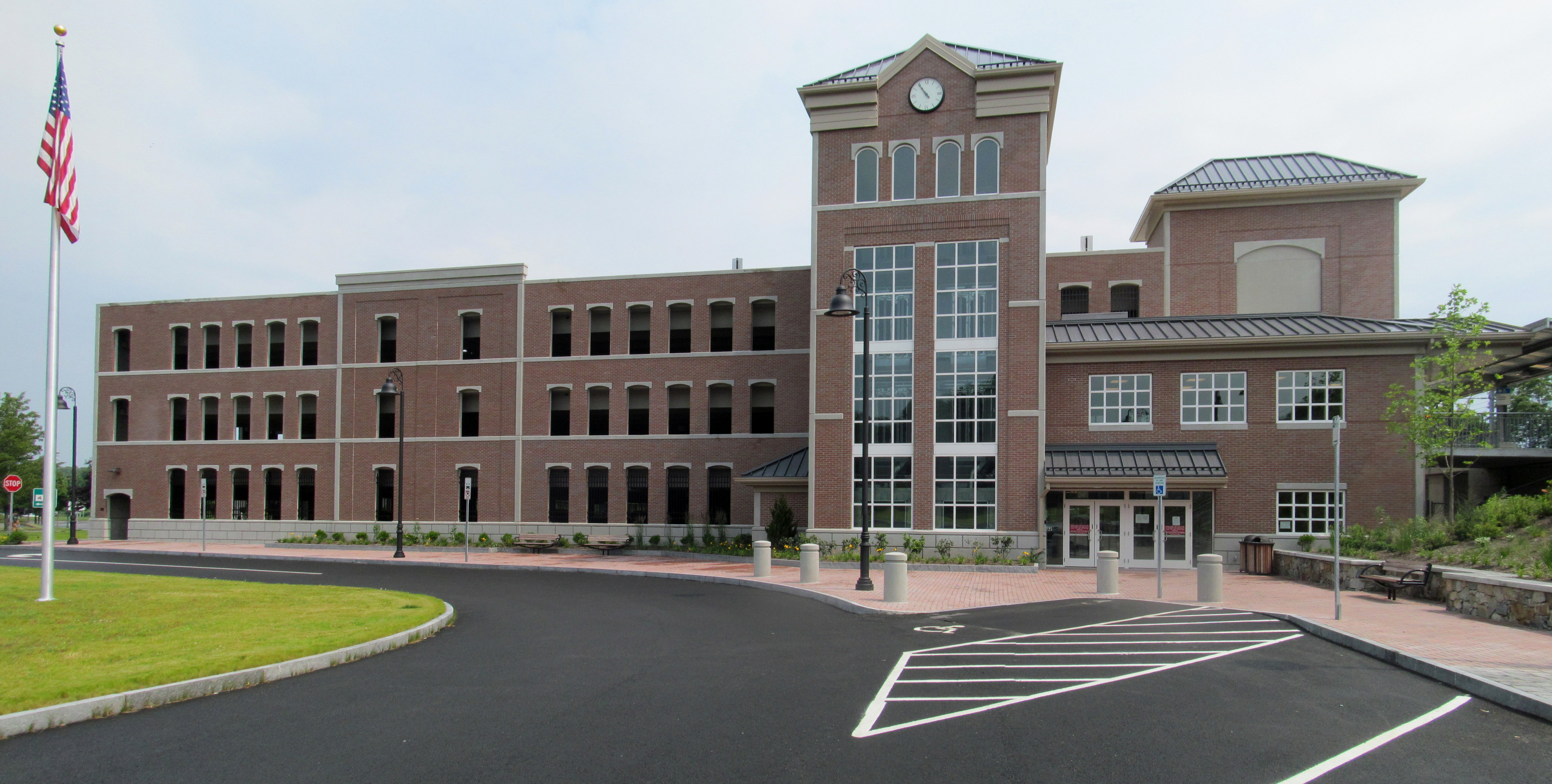
Garage and drop-off lane / busway

Wickford Junction's drop-off lane also serves as a busway, which RIPTA bus route 66 URI/Galilee briefly served before it was rerouted to a park-and-ride closer to Route 2. In January 2013, RIDOT began planning to sell the park-and-ride property and reroute the 66 and the new 65X Wakefield Express to Wickford Junction on all trips; however, the plan was held up by concerns about eliminating free parking in the lot in favor of the paid garage. In July 2015, the agency renewed plans to sell the park-and-ride lot for an estimated $1.9 million and reroute the buses, but similar concerns were voiced at a public meeting. A judge blocked RIDOT's sale plan in July 2017 over concerns that the family of the original property owners (from whom it was taken by eminent domain in the 1930s) may have had the right to buy back the property.

In August 2015, RIDOT announced that it would be taking over operations and maintenance at Wickford Junction from a private contractor. The savings from the change—estimated at $340,000 annually—were to be used to increase frequencies on the 65X route. At the same time, RIDOT began a two-week, $372,500 project to allow bus operations to be shifted to the station, which involved constructing a bus depot next to the garage and a new access driveway from Route 102.

Only several days of "preliminary work" were completed by August 31 when Coie's company, owner of the adjacent shopping plaza, filed a lawsuit against RIDOT. The suit alleged that the changes would reduce traffic to the shopping center and cause a safety issue. RIDOT answered the claim, saying that the 2009 land deal gave the agency exclusive rights to the transit facility land. The state settled the lawsuit with the company in November 2015 by agreeing to pay $750,000 by July 2016. Effective December 7, 2015, all 65X and 66 trips were rerouted to Wickford Junction, with the garage now open 24/7. The restrooms and waiting room had full hours beginning in January 2016. Renovations to the garage took place in 2026.

== Rail operations ==
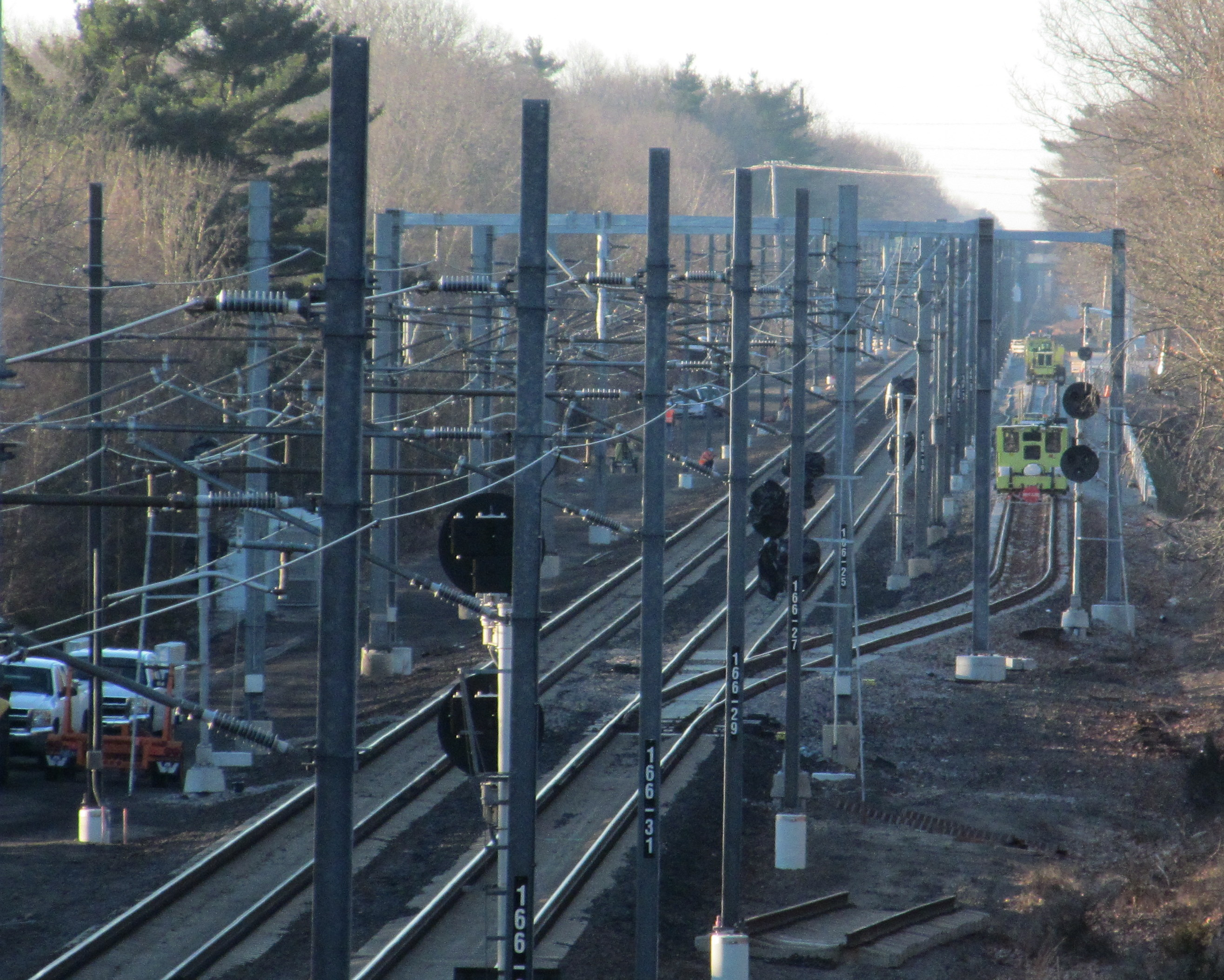
Siding and Stony interlocking construction in January 2012

The station opened on April 23, 2012, with ten trains in each direction on weekdays. Two off-peak trains ran only as far as Providence, while the other eight—including five rush hour trains—ran to Boston. Travel time is approximately 35 minutes to Providence and 100 minutes to Boston.

The station is located on a 0.7-mile (1.1 km) siding which connects to the southbound mainline track of the Northeast Corridor at Stony interlocking, north of the station. The siding allows Amtrak trains to pass while a commuter train is stopped at the station and laying over. Wickford Junction station is located at milepost 165.8 on the Northeast Corridor, 16 miles (26 km) from Providence and 63 miles (101 km) from Boston.

The 2014 State Rail Plan recommended the implementation of shuttle service between Wickford Junction and Providence via T.F. Green Airport with half-hour headways. The service, which could be operated with multiple units rather than conventional locomotive-hauled commuter trains, was expected to increase ridership at Wickford to as much as 3,400 riders per day.
