= National Register of Historic Places listings in Narragansett, Rhode Island =

This is a list of Registered Historic Places in Narragansett, Rhode Island.

Contents: Counties in Rhode Island

Bristol | Kent | Newport | Providence (Pawtucket | Providence (city) | Woonsocket) | Washington

This National Park Service list is complete through NPS recent listings posted May 1, 2026.

	Name on the Register	Image	Date listed	Location	City or town	Description
1	Anthony-Kinney Farm	Anthony-Kinney Farm	April 17, 2013 (#13000178)	505 Point Judith Road; 41°24′26″N 71°28′44″W	Narragansett	
2	Central Street Historic District	Central Street Historic District	August 18, 1982 (#82000015)	Both sides of Central Street from 5th Ave. to Boon St. 41°25′46″N 71°27′44″W	Narragansett	
3	Druidsdream	Druidsdream	July 20, 1989 (#89000940)	144 Gibson Ave. 41°25′02″N 71°27′46″W	Narragansett	
4	The Dunes Club	The Dunes Club	May 18, 2015 (#15000243)	137 Boston Neck Rd. 41°26′23″N 71°26′56″W	Narragansett	
5	Dunmere	Dunmere	September 23, 2005 (#05001061)	560 Ocean Rd. 41°24′16″N 71°27′44″W	Narragansett	
6	Earlscourt Historic District	Earlscourt Historic District	August 18, 1982 (#82000017)	Roughly bounded by Westmoreland, Noble, Woodward Sts., and Gibson Ave.(both sides); 41°25′15″N 71°27′42″W	Narragansett	
7	Gardencourt	Gardencourt	August 18, 1982 (#82000018)	10 Gibson Ave. 41°25′21″N 71°27′39″W	Narragansett	
8	Gladstone Springhouse and Bottling Plant	Gladstone Springhouse and Bottling Plant	May 10, 1984 (#84002051)	145A Boon St. 41°25′35″N 71°27′25″W	Narragansett	
9	Greene Inn	Greene Inn	June 24, 1976 (#76000009)	175 Ocean Rd. 41°25′23″N 71°27′23″W	Narragansett	Burned down in 1980.
10	Narragansett Baptist Church	Narragansett Baptist Church	November 25, 1977 (#77000010)	S. Ferry Rd. 41°29′34″N 71°25′34″W	Narragansett	
11	Narragansett Pier Life Saving Station	Narragansett Pier Life Saving Station	June 30, 1976 (#76000010)	40 Ocean Rd. 41°25′48″N 71°27′20″W	Narragansett	
12	Ocean Road Historic District	Ocean Road Historic District	August 18, 1982 (#82000019)	Ocean and Wildfield Farm Rds., and Newton and Hazard Aves. 41°24′45″N 71°27′22″W	Narragansett	
13	Point Judith Lighthouse	Point Judith Lighthouse	March 30, 1988 (#88000279)	1470 Ocean Rd. 41°21′39″N 71°28′55″W	Narragansett	
14	Towers Historic District	Towers Historic District	August 18, 1982 (#82000021)	Bounded by the Atlantic Ocean, Exchange Pl., and Mathewson and Taylor Sts. 41°25′48″N 71°27′23″W	Narragansett	
15	The Towers	The Towers	November 25, 1969 (#69000001)	Ocean Rd. 41°25′50″N 71°27′22″W	Narragansett	

== See also ==
- National Register of Historic Places listings in Washington County, Rhode Island
- List of National Historic Landmarks in Rhode Island
