= Ocean Road Historic District =

Historic district in Rhode Island, United States

- U.S. National Register of Historic Places
- U.S. Historic district
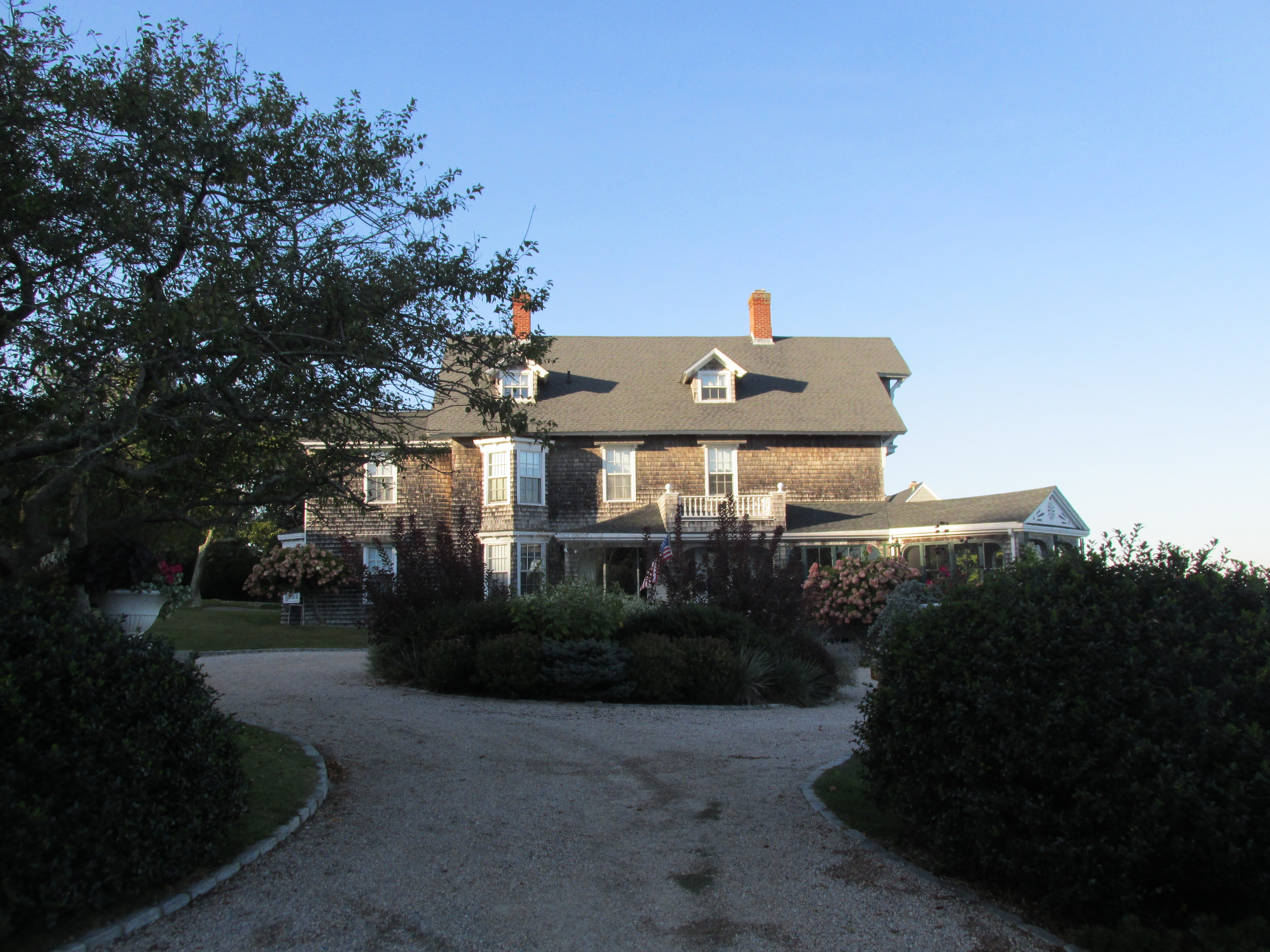
- Flat Rock Cottage

- Location within Rhode Island Location within the United States
- Location: Narragansett, Rhode Island
- Area: 92 acres (37 ha)
- Architect: McKim, Mead & White; William Gibbons Preston
- Architectural style: Queen Anne, Shingle Style
- MPS: Narragansett Pier MRA
- NRHP reference No.: 82000019
- Added to NRHP: August 18, 1982

The Ocean Road Historic District is a residential historic district, encompassing an area of fashionable summer houses built in the late 19th and early 20th centuries in Narragansett, Rhode Island. The area is located south of The Towers, the center of the Narragansett Pier area, extending along Ocean Road roughly from Hazard Street to Wildfield Farm Road. Many of the 45 houses in the district were built between about 1880 and 1900, with a few built earlier and later. The Shingle style is prominent in the architectural styles found, including among houses designed by architects, including McKim, Mead & White and William Gibbons Preston. The most unusual property is called Hazard's Castle, a rambling stone structure built beginning in the 1840s by Joseph Peace Hazard, who was a major landowner in the area prior to its development in the 1880s.

The district was added to the National Register of Historic Places in 1982.

== See also ==
- National Register of Historic Places listings in Washington County, Rhode Island
