= Dunmere =

Dunmere may refer to:

- Dunmere, Cornwall, UK
- Dunmere, Rhode Island, USA
