= Earlscourt Historic District =

Historic district in Rhode Island, United States

- U.S. National Register of Historic Places
- U.S. Historic district
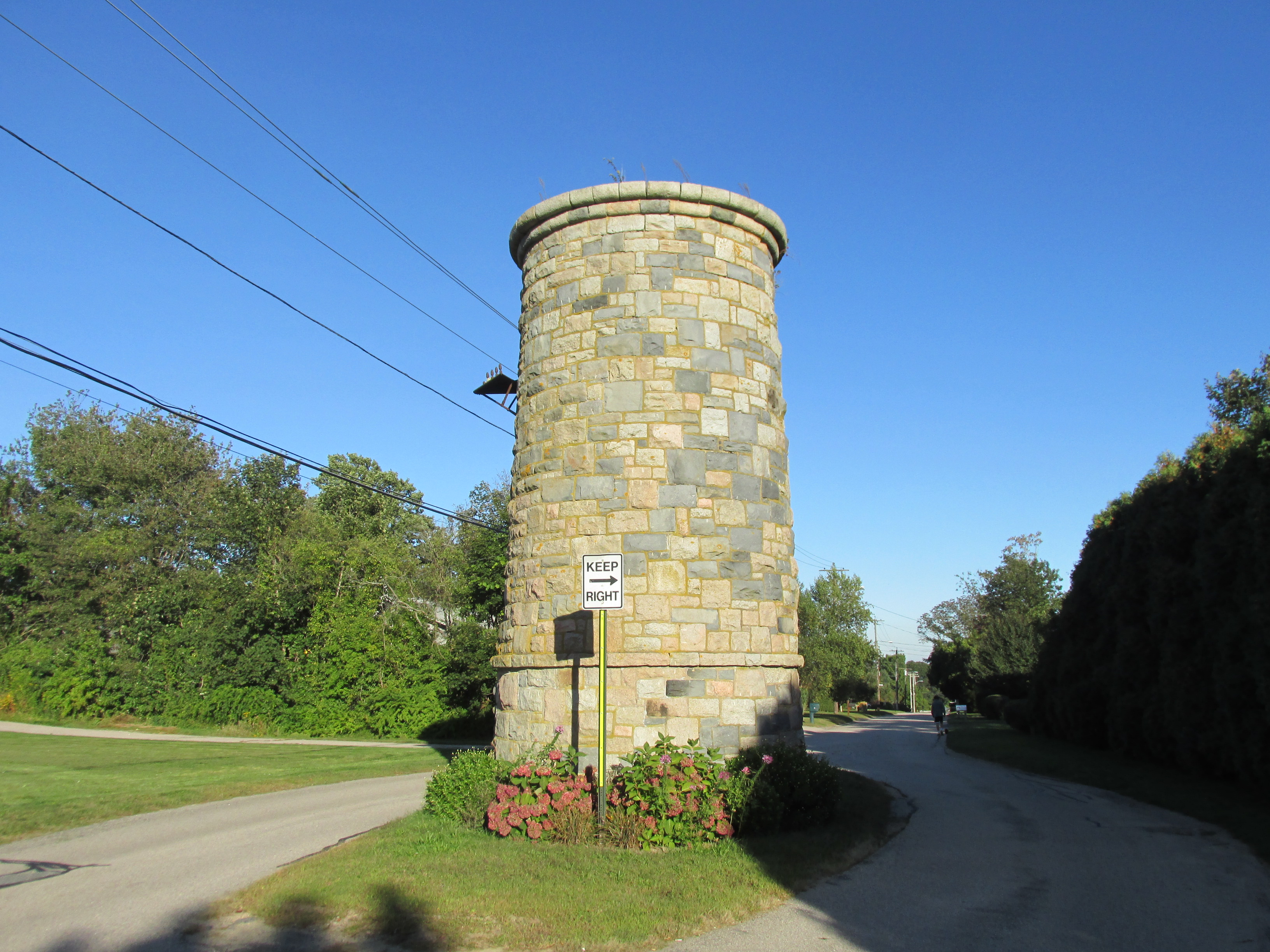
- Remnant of Earles Court Water Tower

- Location within Rhode Island Location within the United States
- Location: Narragansett, Rhode Island
- Architect: McKim, Mead & White; William Gibbons Preston
- Architectural style: Shingle Style
- MPS: Narragansett Pier MRA
- NRHP reference No.: 82000017
- Added to NRHP: August 18, 1982

Earlscourt Historic District is a residential historic district in Narragansett, Rhode Island, United States. It is centered on a stretch of Earles Court, between Gibson Avenue and Noble Street, and includes a few properties on the adjacent Gibson Avenue and Woodward and Westminster Streets. It includes nine residential properties developed in the 1880s and 1890s, during the height of Narragansett Pier's popularity as a summer resort community. All are in the then-popular Shingle Style, and most were designed by well-known architects. The Sherry Cottages, a series of four buildings on Gibson Avenue, were all designed by McKim, Mead & White, who also designed The Towers. The other development is that on Earles Court, designed by D. J. Jardine and Constable Brothers for Edward Earle, a New York lawyer. The central focus of this development is a stone water tower which bisects the roadway.

The district was listed on the National Register of Historic Places in 1982.

== See also ==
- National Register of Historic Places listings in Washington County, Rhode Island
