= Narragansett Church =

Narragansett Church may refer to several churches in Rhode Island, including:

- Old Narragansett Church
- Narragansett Baptist Church
