= Narragansett, Rhode Island =

Town in Rhode Island, United States

- Town
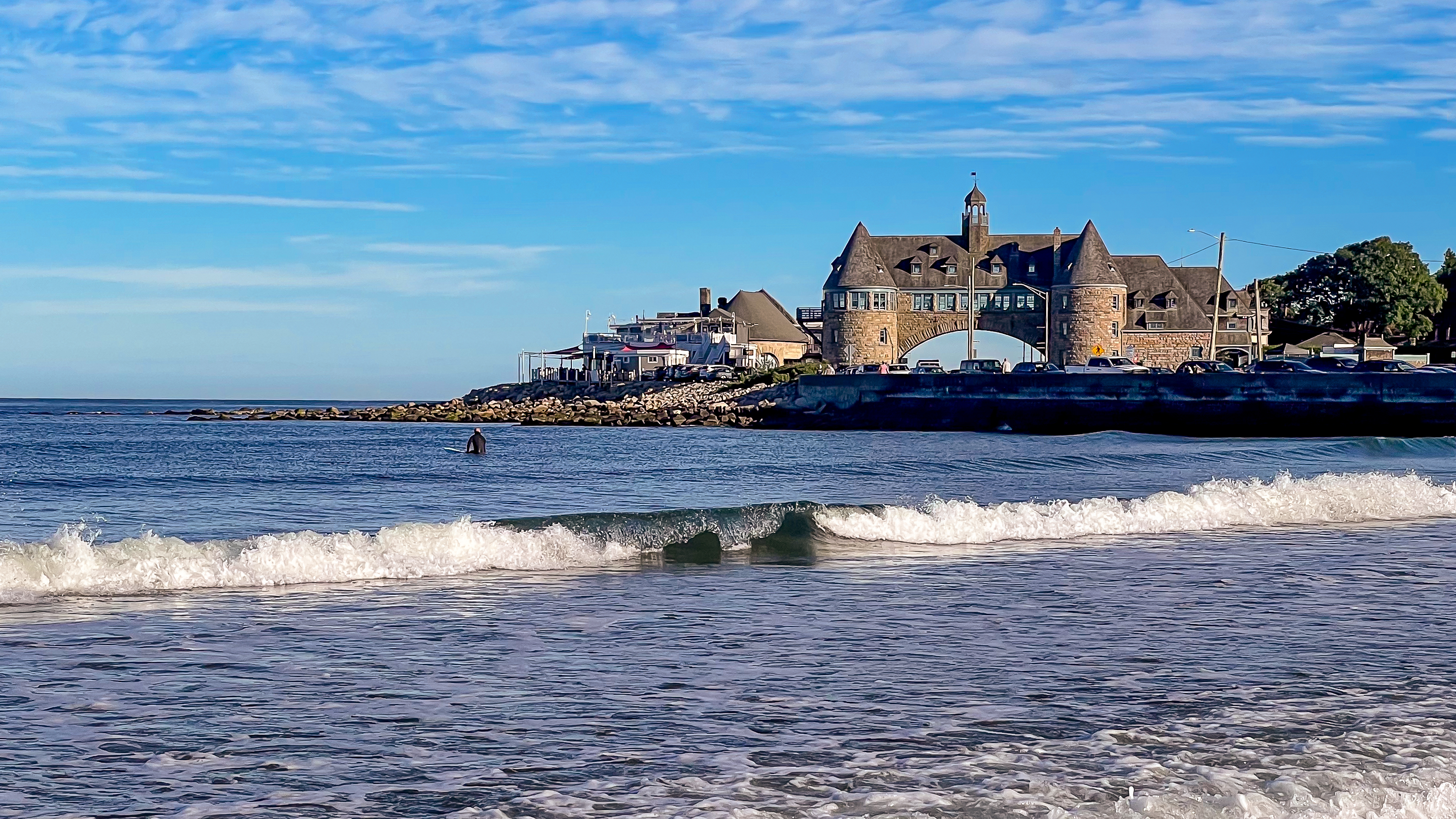
- The Towers in Narragansett

- Seal

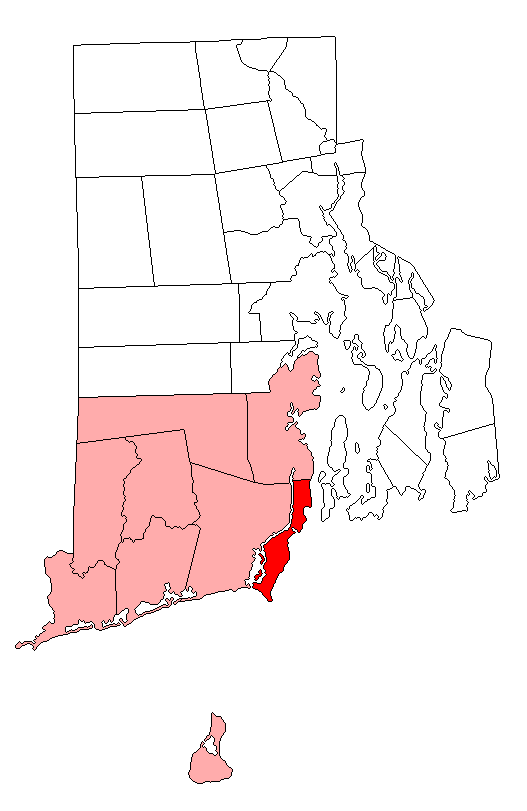
- Location of Narragansett in Washington County, Rhode Island
- Coordinates: 41°26′4″N 71°27′45″W
- Country: United States
- State: Rhode Island
- County: Washington

Area
  - Total: 37.8 sq mi (97.8 km^{2})
  - Land: 14.1 sq mi (36.6 km^{2})
  - Water: 23.6 sq mi (61.2 km^{2})
- Elevation: 20 ft (6 m)

Population (2020)
  - Total: 14,532
  - Density: 1,030/sq mi (397/km^{2})
- Time zone: UTC-5 (Eastern (EST))
  - Summer (DST): UTC-4 (EDT)
- ZIP Codes: 02874 (Saunderstown), 02882 (Narragansett)
- Area code: 401
- FIPS code: 44-48340
- Website: www.narragansettri.gov

Narragansett is a town in Washington County, Rhode Island, United States. The population was 14,532 at the 2020 census. However, during the summer months the town's population more than doubles to near 34,000. The town of Narragansett occupies a narrow strip of land running along the eastern bank of the Pettaquamscutt River (aka Narrow River) to the shore of Narragansett Bay on the Atlantic Ocean. It was separated from South Kingstown in 1888 and incorporated as a town in 1901. With several ocean beaches and a walkable strip along the ocean front, Narragansett is a resort area in the summer season as well as a popular East Coast surfing spot due to frequent southerly swells from Atlantic Ocean. It is named after the Narrangansett nation.

== Geography ==
According to the United States Census Bureau, the town has a total area of 37.8 square miles (98 km^{2}), of which 14.1 square miles (37 km^{2}) is land and 23.6 square miles (61 km^{2}) (62.56%) is water.

The following villages and neighborhoods are wholly or partially located in Narragansett: Saunderstown (shared with North Kingstown), South Ferry, Bonnet Shores, Narragansett Pier, Point Judith, Galilee, Great Island, Salt Pond, Mettatuxet, and Jerusalem (shared with South Kingstown).

=== Climate ===
Narragansett is located in the Köppen climate classification Cfa (mild temperate climate). The period from May through mid November is often warm to mild (occasionally hot in June, July, and August) with frequent sunny skies and modest rainfall. The cold season from December through March features cool to cold weather with high temperatures from 40 F (4.4 C) to 49 F (9.4 C). Normally snowfall is light and melts quickly due to the oceanic location. The area averages about 200 frost - free days annually. Narragansett averages 2300 hrs of sunshine annually (slightly higher than the USA average). Narragansett is located in USDA garden zone 7a/7b.

Climate data for Narragansett, Rhode Island
Month	Jan	Feb	Mar	Apr	May	Jun	Jul	Aug	Sep	Oct	Nov	Dec	Year
Record high °F (°C)	66 (19)	65 (18)	79 (26)	89 (32)	91 (33)	94 (34)	98 (37)	96 (36)	93 (34)	83 (28)	74 (23)	70 (21)	98 (37)
Mean daily maximum °F (°C)	40 (4)	42 (6)	49 (9)	59 (15)	69 (21)	78 (26)	83 (28)	82 (28)	75 (24)	65 (18)	54 (12)	45 (7)	62 (17)
Mean daily minimum °F (°C)	22 (−6)	23 (−5)	29 (−2)	38 (3)	48 (9)	58 (14)	64 (18)	63 (17)	56 (13)	45 (7)	36 (2)	27 (−3)	42 (6)
Record low °F (°C)	−6 (−21)	−6 (−21)	3 (−16)	19 (−7)	31 (−1)	41 (5)	50 (10)	49 (9)	35 (2)	27 (−3)	15 (−9)	4 (−16)	−6 (−21)
Average precipitation inches (mm)	3.66 (93)	3.23 (82)	4.52 (115)	3.90 (99)	3.54 (90)	3.90 (99)	3.66 (93)	4.03 (102)	3.90 (99)	4.64 (118)	3.78 (96)	4.52 (115)	47.28 (1,201)
Average snowfall inches (cm)	7 (18)	7 (18)	3 (7.6)	0 (0)	0 (0)	0 (0)	0 (0)	0 (0)	0 (0)	0.1 (0.25)	1 (2.5)	3 (7.6)	21.1 (53.95)

== Demographics ==
Historical population
Census	Pop.	Note	%±
1890	1,408		—
1900	1,523		8.2%
1910	1,250		−17.9%
1920	993		−20.6%
1930	1,258		26.7%
1940	1,560		24.0%
1950	2,288		46.7%
1960	3,444		50.5%
1970	7,138		107.3%
1980	12,088		69.3%
1990	14,985		24.0%
2000	16,361		9.2%
2010	15,868		−3.0%
2020	14,532		−8.4%
U.S. Decennial Census

=== 2020 census ===
The 2020 United States census counted 14,532 people and 6,097 households in Narragansett. The population density was 1,048.1 inhabitants per square mile (404.7/km^{2}). There were 9,857 housing units in the town. The racial makeup was 93.28% white or European American, 0.56% black or African-American, 0.50% Native American or Alaska Native, 1.31% Asian, 0.05% Pacific Islander or Native Hawaiian, 0.81% from other races, and 3.48% from two or more races. Hispanic or Latino of any race was 2.05% of the population.

Of the 6,097 households, 15.3% had children under the age of 18; 40.3% were married couples living together; 36.1% had a female householder with no spouse present. 11.4% of households consisted of individuals and 3.9% had someone living alone who was 65 years of age or older. The percent of those with a bachelor’s degree or higher was estimated to be 42.3% of the population.

11.4% of the population was under the age of 18, 22.3% from 18 to 24, 15.4% from 25 to 44, 27.1% from 45 to 64, and 23.7% who were 65 years of age or older. The median age was 46.2 years.

The 2016–2020 5-year American Community Survey estimates show that the median household income was $79,056 (with a margin of error of +/- $16,106) and the median family income was $125,357 (+/- $25,707). Males had a median income of $52,738 (+/- $15,287) versus $20,882 (+/- $20,090) for females. The median income for those above 16 years old was $31,056 (+/- $18,353). Approximately 8.2% of families and 17.9% of the population were below the poverty line, including 0.0% of those under the age of 18 and 8.0% of those ages 65 or over.

=== 2000 census ===
As of the census of 2000, there were 16,361 people, 6,846 households, and 3,847 families residing in the town. The population density was 1,156.5 inhabitants per square mile (446.5/km^{2}). There were 9,159 housing units at an average density of 647.4 per square mile (250.0/km^{2}). The racial makeup of the town was 95.84% White, 0.75% African American, 0.90% Native American, 0.76% Asian, 0.02% Pacific Islander, 0.34% from other races, and 1.40% from two or more races. Hispanic or Latino of any race were 1.25% of the population.

There were 6,846 households, out of which 22.0% had children under the age of 18 living with them, 44.6% were married couples living together, 8.7% had a female householder with no husband present, and 43.8% were non-families. Of all households 27.2% were made up of individuals, and 9.0% had someone living alone who was 65 years of age or older. The average household size was 2.38 and the average family size was 2.86.

In the town, the population was spread out, with 17.3% under the age of 18, 19.6% from 18 to 24, 25.0% from 25 to 44, 24.6% from 45 to 64, and 13.5% who were 65 years of age or older. The median age was 36 years. For every 100 females, there were 94.5 males. For every 100 females age 18 and over, there were 92.4 males.

The median income for a household in the town was $50,363, and the median income for a family was $67,571. Males had a median income of $45,436 versus $31,759 for females. The per capita income for the town was $28,194. About 4.9% of families and 16.0% of the population were below the poverty line, including 8.4% of those under age 18 and 5.0% of those age 65 or over. In 2010, Narragansett was estimated to have 2,743 people in poverty; college students represented 71% of that group, and in comparison, statewide college students make up only 13.7 percent of the total population in poverty. This large college factor, in a relatively small community, has a profound impact on the overall poverty rate.

From September through May the town is home to many students from the University of Rhode Island located in nearby Kingston.

== Recreation ==
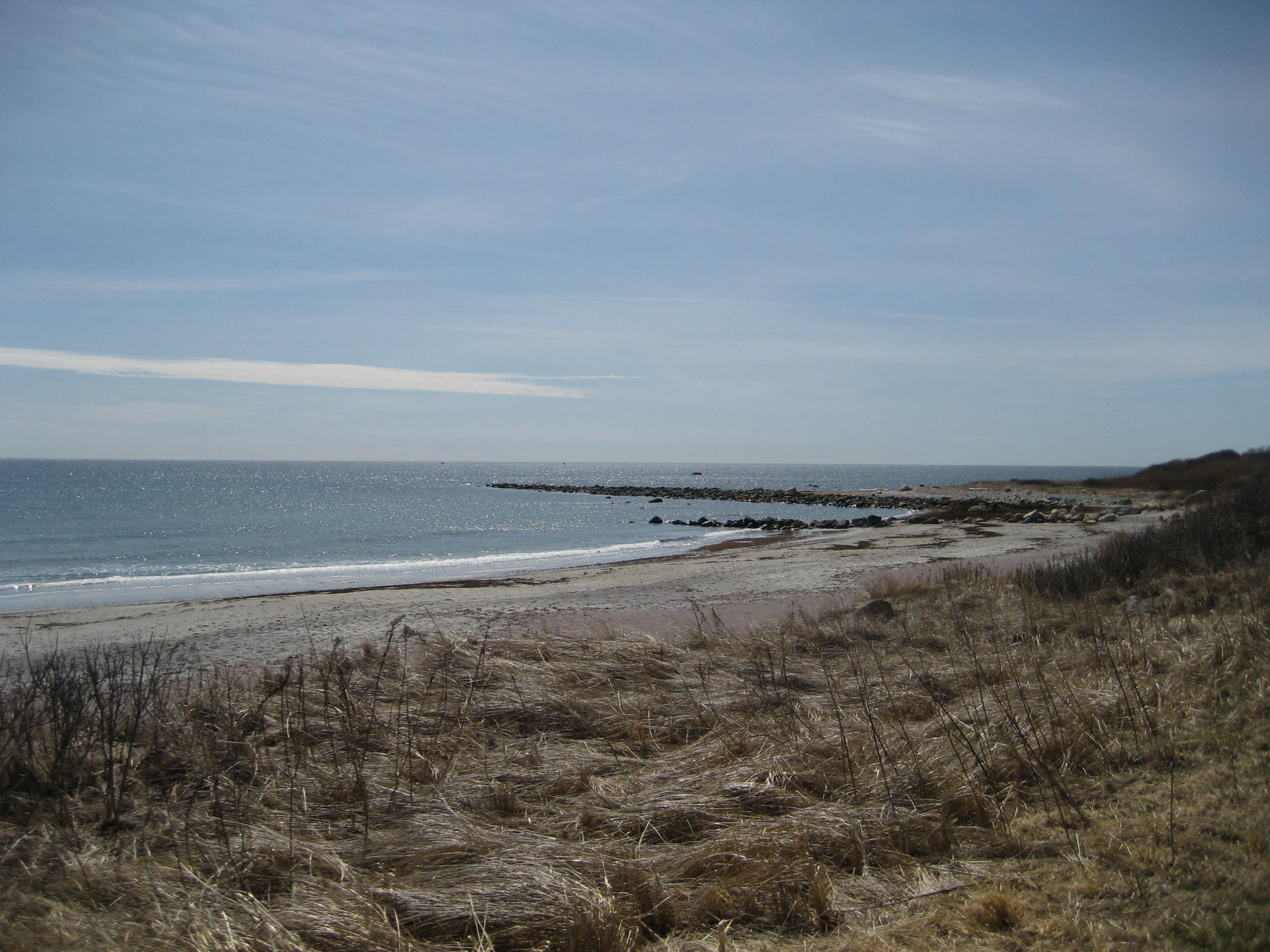
Scarborough State Beach

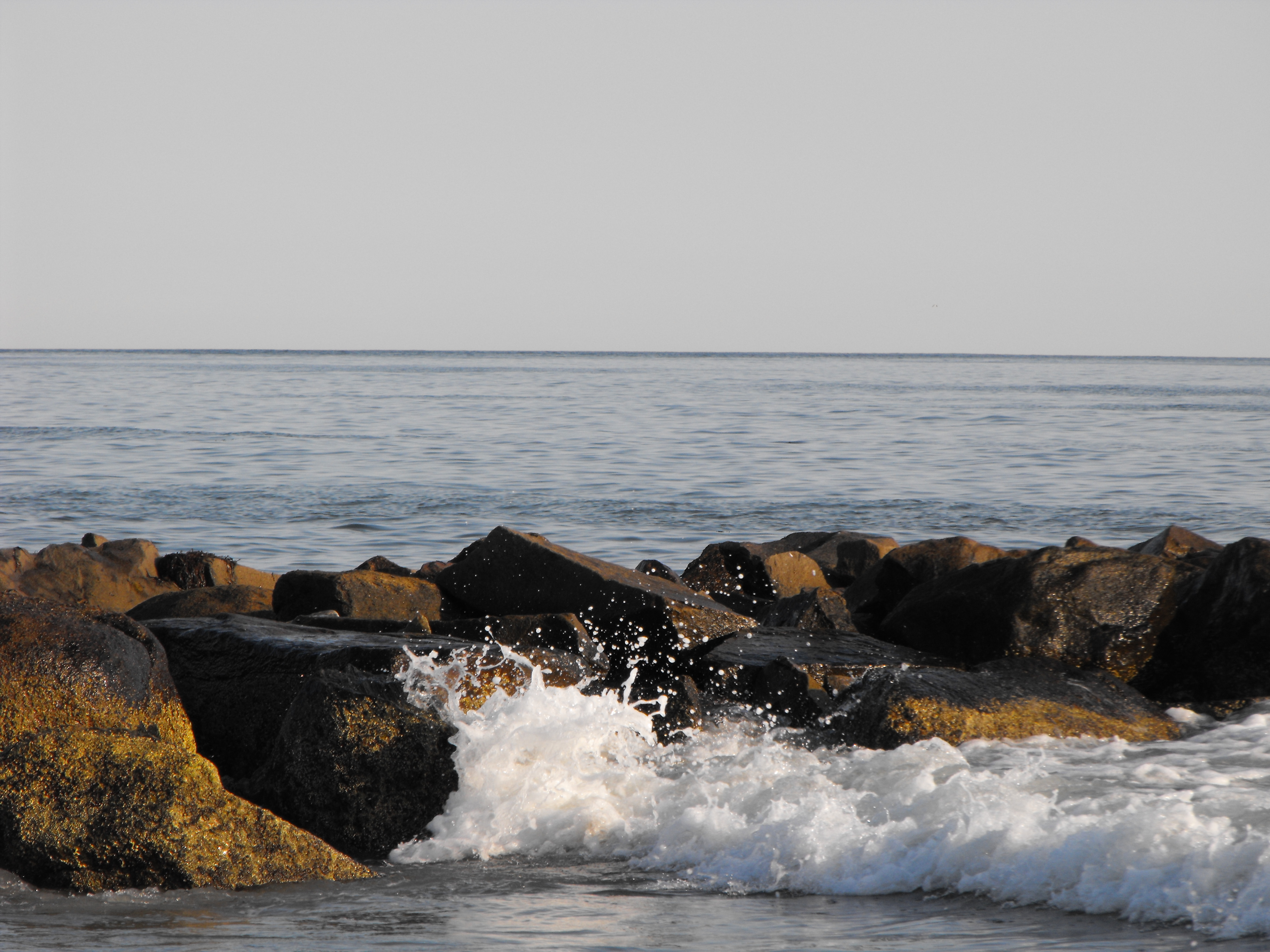
Waves crashing on a rock in the Atlantic Ocean, visible from the Seawall of Narragansett.

Narragansett is known for its summer recreation and beaches. Fishermen's Memorial State Park, located near Galilee, contains a former military fort (Fort Greene) and a campground.

Three beaches in Narragansett that are most famous are:

- Narragansett Town Beach is located in the center of Narragansett, though it charges a fee—whereas other local (state funded) beaches charge for parking only. Unlike state-funded beaches, it is self-sustaining and is not supported by the tax payers' money. There is a $10.00 charge to park ($15.00 on the weekends/holidays) and a daily $10.00 admission fee to enter onto the beach. Residents of the town of Narragansett are able to buy seasonal beach access passes and parking passes for the main beach parking lots.
- Scarborough State Beach: The Scarborough Beach Complex comprises two separate areas, the North and South. Each has a pavilion, showers, 75 picnic tables, boardwalk and observation tower. There is a small fee for parking if a spot on nearby streets can not be found. Parking on nearby streets can result in vehicles being towed (especially during the summer months). This beach sits next to a local sewage treatment plant.
- Roger Wheeler State Beach and Salty Brine State Beach are both located in Point Judith, which is the southernmost point of Narragansett. Both beaches are protected by the breakwater that protects the port of Galilee. A new pavilion at Salty Brine State Beach opened in the summer of 2010, complete with concessions, and a wind turbine. The wind turbine was destroyed after a storm in March 2017.

== Education ==
Narragansett operates its own Pre-K through 12 educational system with three schools: Narragansett Elementary School, Narragansett Pier Middle School, and Narragansett High School. The former Narragansett High School principal, Mr. Daniel F. Warner, was voted the 2008 Principal of the Year. The South County Museum is located within the town. The Narragansett Bay Campus of the University of Rhode Island is located in Narragansett.

== Housing ==
Narragansett has prohibited more than three college students from living together per housing unit.

== Water supply ==
The town is served by two drinking water organizations divided into four systems:

- The Town of Narragansett Water Division – which purchases its water from external sources:
  - North End Suez – which purchases its water from Suez Water, a private company in South Kingstown with wells drawing from the Mink Brook Aquifer
  - North End North Kingston – which purchases its water from Town of North Kingstown which has wells drawing from the Hunt Annaquatucket-Pettaquamscutt (HAP) aquifer system
  - Point Judith – which purchases its water from Suez Water
- Suez Water also has direct retail customers in Narragansett.

== Economy ==
=== Top employers ===
According to Narragansett's 2012 Comprehensive Annual Financial Report, the top employers in the city are:

#	Employer	# of Employees
1	Town of Narragansett	448
2	University of Rhode Island Narragansett Bay Campus	245
3	Stop & Shop	225
4	The Dunes Club	180
5	VNS Home Health Service	150
6	Environmental Protection Agency	160
7	DeWal Industries	120
8	George's of Galilee	100
9	National Marine Fisheries Service	70

== Places of worship ==
- St. Thomas More Church (Roman Catholic)
- St. Veronica Chapel (Roman Catholic)
- St. Mary Star of the Sea Church (Roman Catholic)
- St. Peter By-the-Sea Church (Episcopal)
- Calvary Bible Church (Nondenominational)
- First Baptist Church of Narragansett
- South Ferry Church (Baptist, no regular services)
- Church of Jesus Christ of Latter-day Saints, Narragansett Ward
- Generation Church (nondenominational)
- Congregation Beth David (Jewish conservative)

== National Register of Historic Places ==
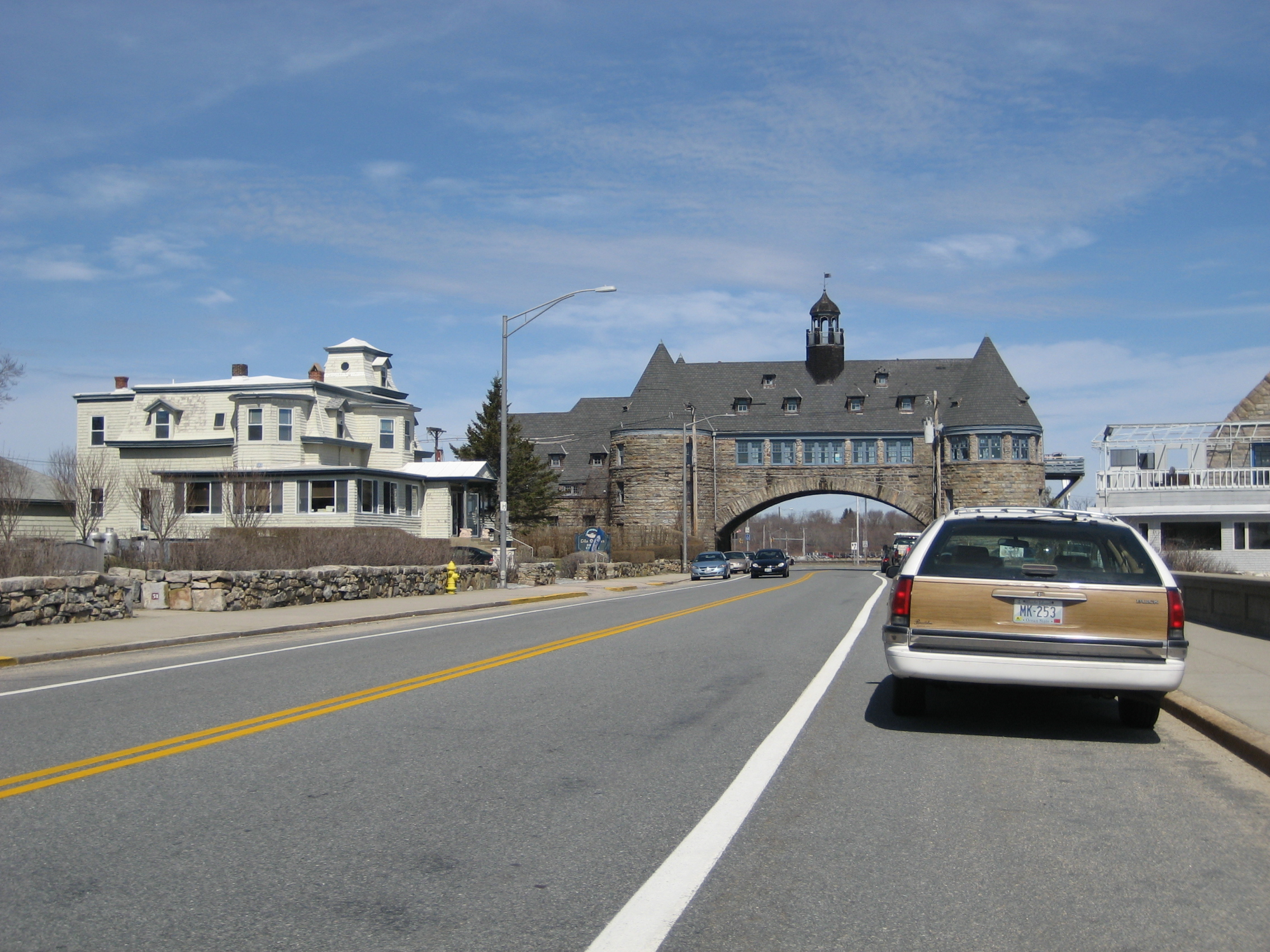
The Towers, which pass over Ocean Road along Rhode Island Sound, is Narragansett's most famous landmark.

Thirteen different buildings and districts in Narragansett are listed on the National Register of Historic Places:

- Central Street Historic District
- The Dunes Club (1928)
- Druidsdream (1884)
- Dunmere (1883)
- Earlscourt Historic District
- Gardencourt (1888)
- Gladstone Springhouse and Bottling Plant (1899)
- Greene Inn (1887)
- Narragansett Baptist Church (1850)
- Narragansett Pier Life Saving Station (1888)
- Ocean Road Historic District
- Point Judith Lighthouse (1857)
- Towers Historic District
- The Towers (1883)

== Notable people ==
- Karen Adams, television news anchor
- Andy Boss, auto racing driver
- Geoff Boss, auto racing driver
- Peter Boss, auto racing driver
- John Joseph Boylan, Roman Catholic bishop; died in Narragansett
- Ruth Clifford, silent film actress; lived in Narragasnett
- David Caprio, attorney and former state representative
- Frank Caprio, judge and television personality
- Frank T. Caprio, former state treasurer
- Alana DiMario, member of the Rhode Island Senate
- Patrick Doyle, Domino’s Pizza CEO
- Roberta Dunbar, clubwoman, born Narragansett Pier
- Joe Faragalli, football player and coach; died in Narragansett
- Steven Fulop, current mayor of Jersey City, New Jersey
- John Gardner, farmer and Rhode Island delegate to the Continental Congress (1789)
- Harriet Lane, acting first lady of the United States for her uncle James Buchanan
- Donald Lally, former state representative
- Ted Leo, indie rock musician; lives in Narragansett
- J. Howard McGrath, former United States attorney general (1949–1952) and governor of Rhode Island (1941–1945); died in Narragansett
- Christopher Murney, actor
- Peter Pezzelli, novelist
- William Russell Sweet, painter and sculptor
- Tage Thompson, NHL Hockey player
- Jack Zilly, football player; died in Narragansett
- John Cafferty and the Beaver Brown Band, Rock music group

== In popular culture ==
- Narragansett is mentioned in Chapter LI of Theodore Dreiser's The Titan.
- Several episodes in the television cartoon show Family Guy, which takes place in Rhode Island, feature the Narragansett Beach, most notably A Fish out of Water.
- In the 1973 movie The Sting, the Narragansett horse race track is one of those mentioned in the background while performing the con for the mob boss Doyle Lonnegan (Robert Shaw); this track, while well known in the period, was actually in Pawtucket, RI.
- In the 1993 movie Coneheads, Prymatt Conehead, portrayed by Jane Curtin, receives a fake ID where it is mentioned she was born in Narragansett, RI.
- Several scenes from the 2000 movie Me, Myself & Irene, starring Jim Carrey, were filmed in the Great Island area of Narragansett.

== See also ==
- Narragansett Runestone
