= St. Thomas More Parish (Narragansett, Rhode Island) =

Coordinates: 41.428290°N 71.462773°W

St. Thomas More Parish includes both St. Thomas More Church and St. Veronica Chapel, both located in Narragansett, Rhode Island.

== History ==
=== 19th century beginnings ===
In the mid-1800s, as Narragansett's population and tourist industry grew, so did its Catholic population, which lacked its own Roman Catholic church. The nearby Our Lady of Mercy parish in East Greenwich, Rhode Island took in the growing village as a mission. In 1879, the village was incorporated into Wakefield's St. Francis Parish, and a Narragansett congregation was established. The first Catholic church building, a small wooden chapel in the Gothic architectural style, was built in 1884. The new church was dedicated to St. Philomena.

=== A growing community and new church ===
By the 20th century, the growing population had rendered the original chapel too small for the congregation. A larger space was needed. In 1908, a new church was completed designed by architects Murphy, Hindle & Wright. The new church, with its distinctive wood shingles, tall bell tower, and Romanesque features immediately became a neighborhood landmark. The old chapel, still standing one plot over from the new structure, became a multipurpose center used mostly for parish social activities. In 1917, St. Philomena's was recognized as a distinct parish after 38 years of sponsorship, first by Our Lady of Mercy and then by St. Francis. In 1961, after authenticity questions regarding St. Philomena, the church was rededicated to English martyr St. Thomas More. In 1977, the original chapel was demolished and a new rectory and much-needed parish center were constructed, connected to the new church and in the same architectural style.

=== Today ===
In recent years, a new chapel, St. Veronica, was built on Boston Neck Road to serve the quickly growing summer population. The facility was originally only open in the summer, but is now open year-round due to the growing Catholic population in the area. On 14 October 2011, Saint Thomas More Church was honored at the Third Annual Rhode Island Preservation Celebration with a 'Rhody' Preservation Project Award. The Rhody was awarded in honor of the efforts of the pastor, Fr. Marcel Taillon, who had just overseen an extensive renovation on the historic building. Their award stated: “Restoration of the century-old building was an ambitious project that demonstrated the parish’s commitment to their church and its place in historic Narragansett Pier.”
