= Narragansett Town Beach =

Beach in Rhode Island, United States

- Beach
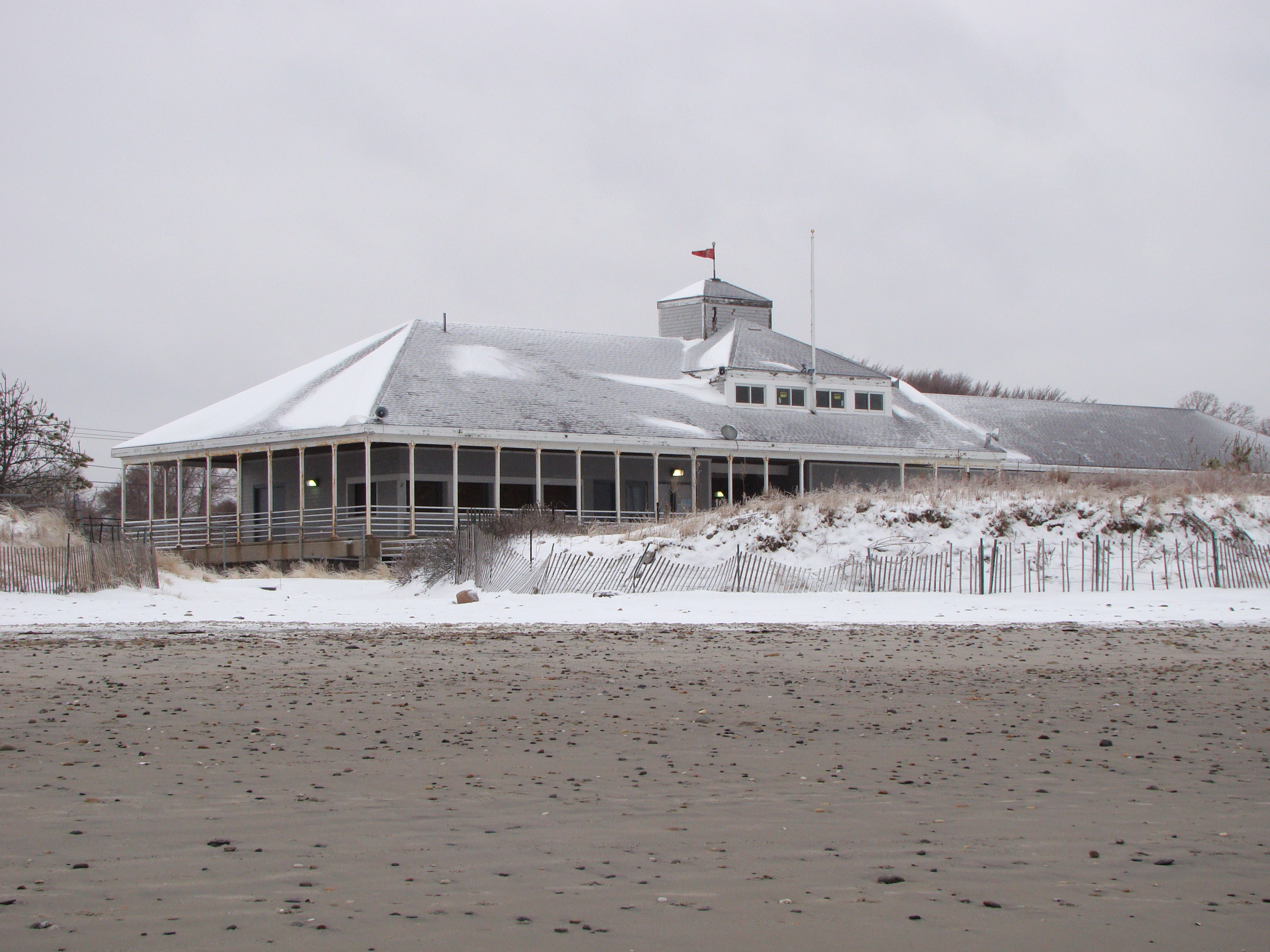
- A view of the North Pavilion of the Narragansett, RI beach in winter.

- Location within Rhode Island
- Coordinates: 41°26′13″N 71°27′11.39″W
- Location: Narragansett, Rhode Island, United States

Narragansett Town Beach is a public recreation area encompassing 19 acres (7.7 ha) on the eastern edge of the town of Narragansett, Rhode Island, and south of the western passage that connects the Narragansett Bay to the open waters of Rhode Island Sound. The southern shoreline is rocky with a concrete sea wall constructed upland, while the northeast end of the beach is characterized by the entrance to Narrow River and Cormorant Point.

The town beach offers picnicking, ocean swimming, changing rooms, surfing, and beach activities for approximately the first half mile of the beach, while the northeast end remains privately owned. The beach and dunes provide an important wildlife habitat for certain species of shorebirds, including piping plovers.

== History ==
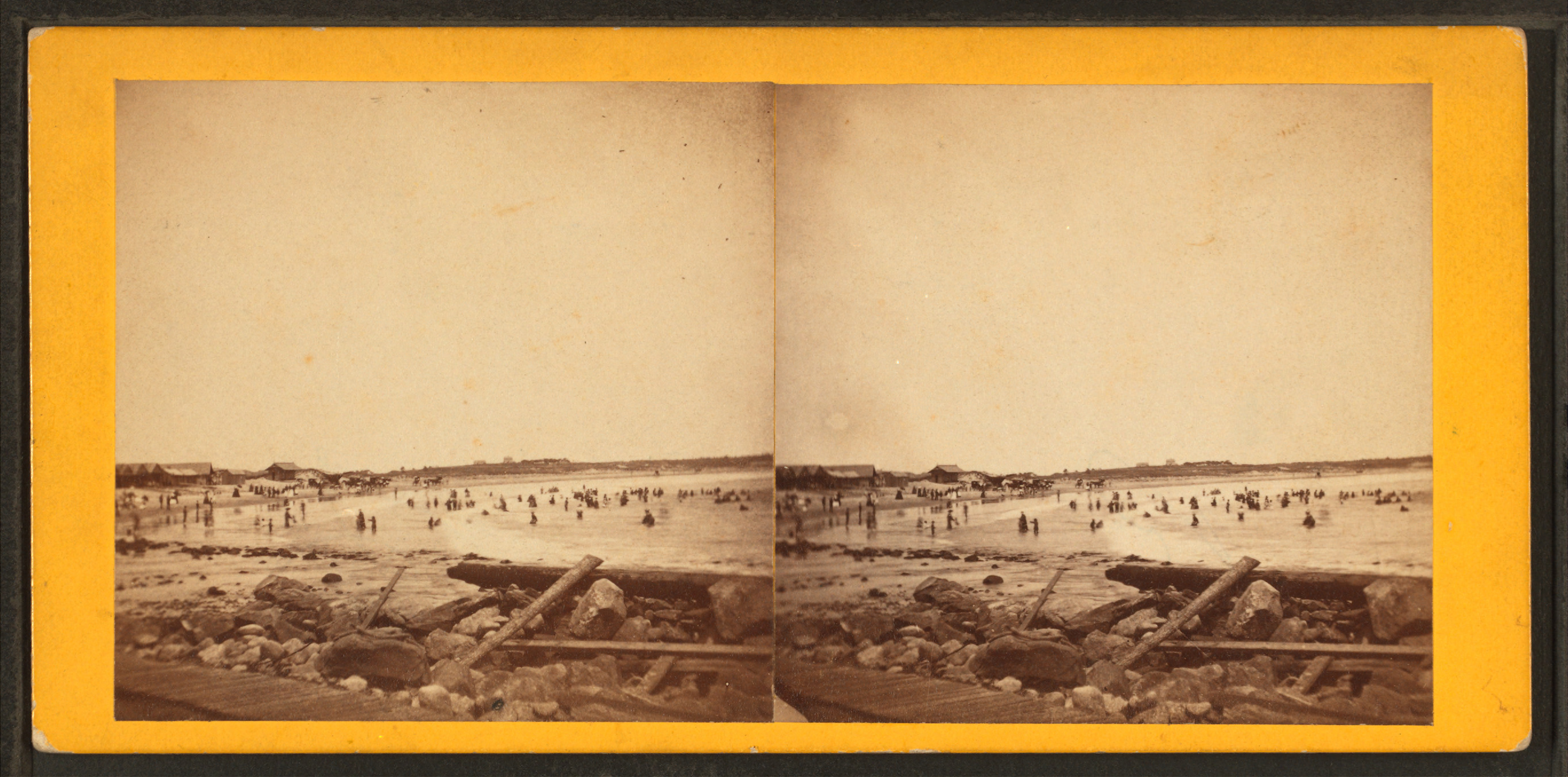
Narragansett Beach, with some bathers, by L. H. Clarke

The town of Narragansett acquired the privately owned beach area, with the exception of the Dunes Club at the north end of the beach, in the aftermath of the Great Hurricane of 1938 - with the town recommending ownership of the beach on Jan 13, 1939. This was followed by a unanimous vote by 250 participants to acquire and operate the beach on March 24, 1939. Advertisement of the beach to the public began on June 2, 1939, and generated revenues of approximately $14,000 in 1940. By the 1960s, the beach drew approximately 130,000 annual visitors, creating a hub for the local economy. By 2011, the beach has become the destination for as many as 10,000 visitors per day, with an average annual net income of approximately $270,000.

On July 23, 1947, the Chamber of Commerce endorsed the construction of breakwaters at each end of the beachfront, with the Narragansett Planning board recommending the construction of a 750-foot jetty to be constructed on the southern end of the beach, on March 11, 1949, to address erosion issues - an ongoing and historic issue for the beach.
