= John Gardner (Continental Congress) =

American politician

- Born: 1747; South Kingstown, Colony of Rhode Island
- Died: October 18, 1808 (aged 60–61); South Kingstown, Rhode Island
- Occupation: Farmer
- Known for: Delegate to the Continental Congress for Rhode Island in 1789

John Gardner (1747–1808) was an American farmer from South Kingstown and Narragansett, Rhode Island. He was a delegate to the Continental Congress for Rhode Island in 1789. Many sources spell his last name as Gardiner.

Gardner's parents were Colonel John Gardner (1696–1770) and his second wife, Mary (Taylor) Gardner. He was born in South Kingstown in 1747. During the early days of the Revolutionary War he served with a militia company known as the Kingstown Reds, and was commissioned as a captain in November 1775.

Gardner served several times as a judge, or justice of the peace. His first such appointment came in 1776, and his last in 1791. In 1786 and 1787 he served in the Rhode Island General Assembly as a member of the Paper Money Party. The Assembly sent him as a delegate to the Continental Congress in 1789.

John died in South Kingstown on October 18, 1808.
