= Narragansett Pier Life Saving Station =

Building in Narragansett, Rhode Island

- Coast Guard House
- U.S. National Register of Historic Places
- U.S. Historic district – Contributing property
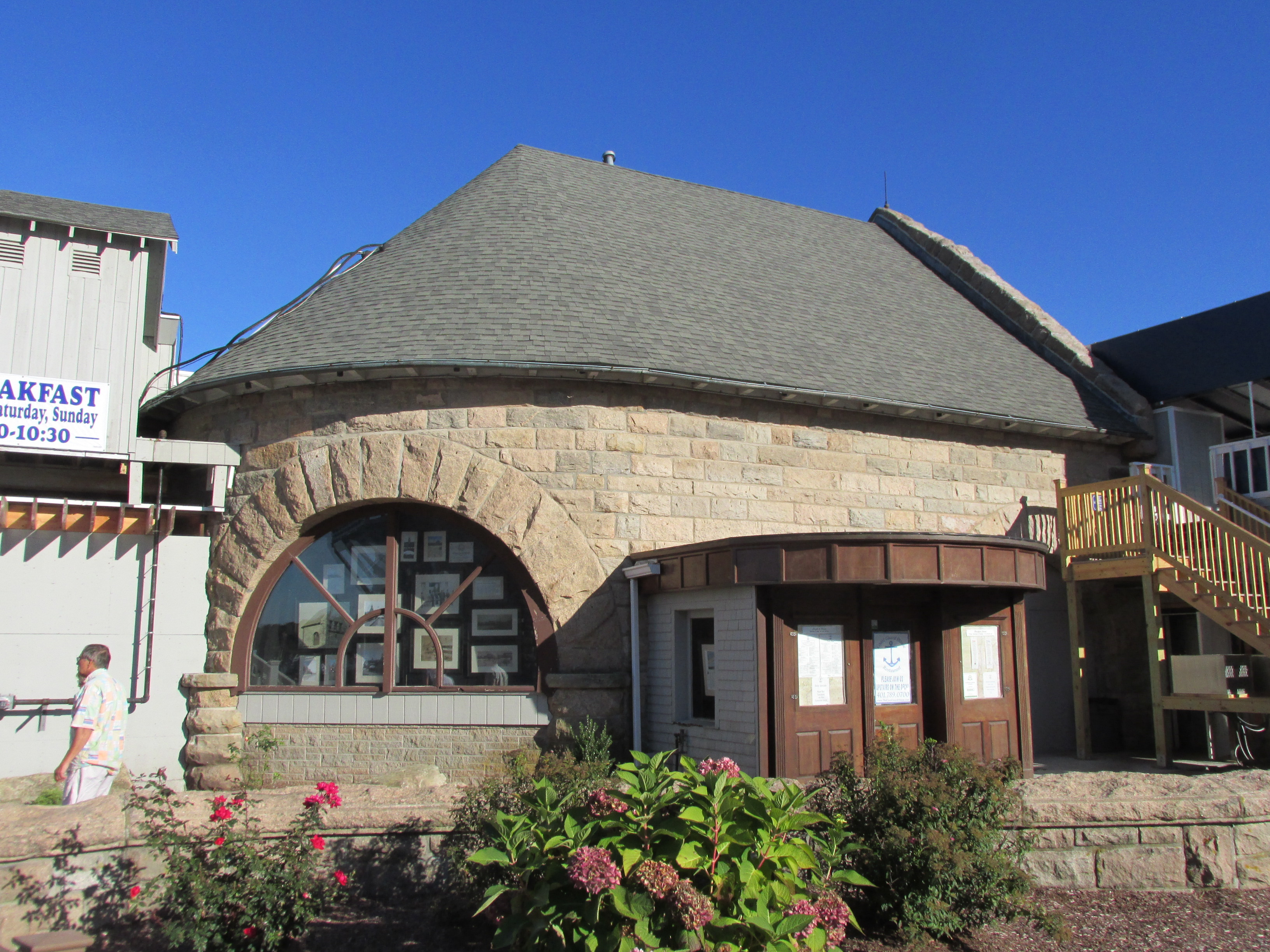
- The Coast Guard House

- Location within Rhode Island Location within the United States
- Location: Narragansett, Rhode Island
- Coordinates: 41°25′48″N 71°27′20″W
- Built: 1888
- Architect: McKim, Mead & White
- Part of: Towers Historic District (ID82000021)
- NRHP reference No.: 76000010

Significant dates
- Added to NRHP: June 30, 1976
- Designated CP: August 18, 1982

The Coast Guard House is a historic lifesaving station at 40 Ocean Road in Narragansett, Rhode Island.

The station was built in 1888 by McKim, Mead, and White, during the heyday of Narragansett Pier as a summer resort community. It is a roughly oblong block, semicircular at its north end, with a steep slate roof that curves with the line of the wall at the north end. The building served as a lifesaving station from 1888 to 1946, and was converted to a restaurant in the 1960s. This resulted in the addition of a large dining area to the south and east, and the leveling of the floor in the boat storage area. The southern end of the second floor was damaged by fire in 1975.

The building was listed on the National Register of Historic Places in 1976.

== See also ==
- National Register of Historic Places listings in Washington County, Rhode Island
