= The Dunes Club =

- U.S. National Register of Historic Places
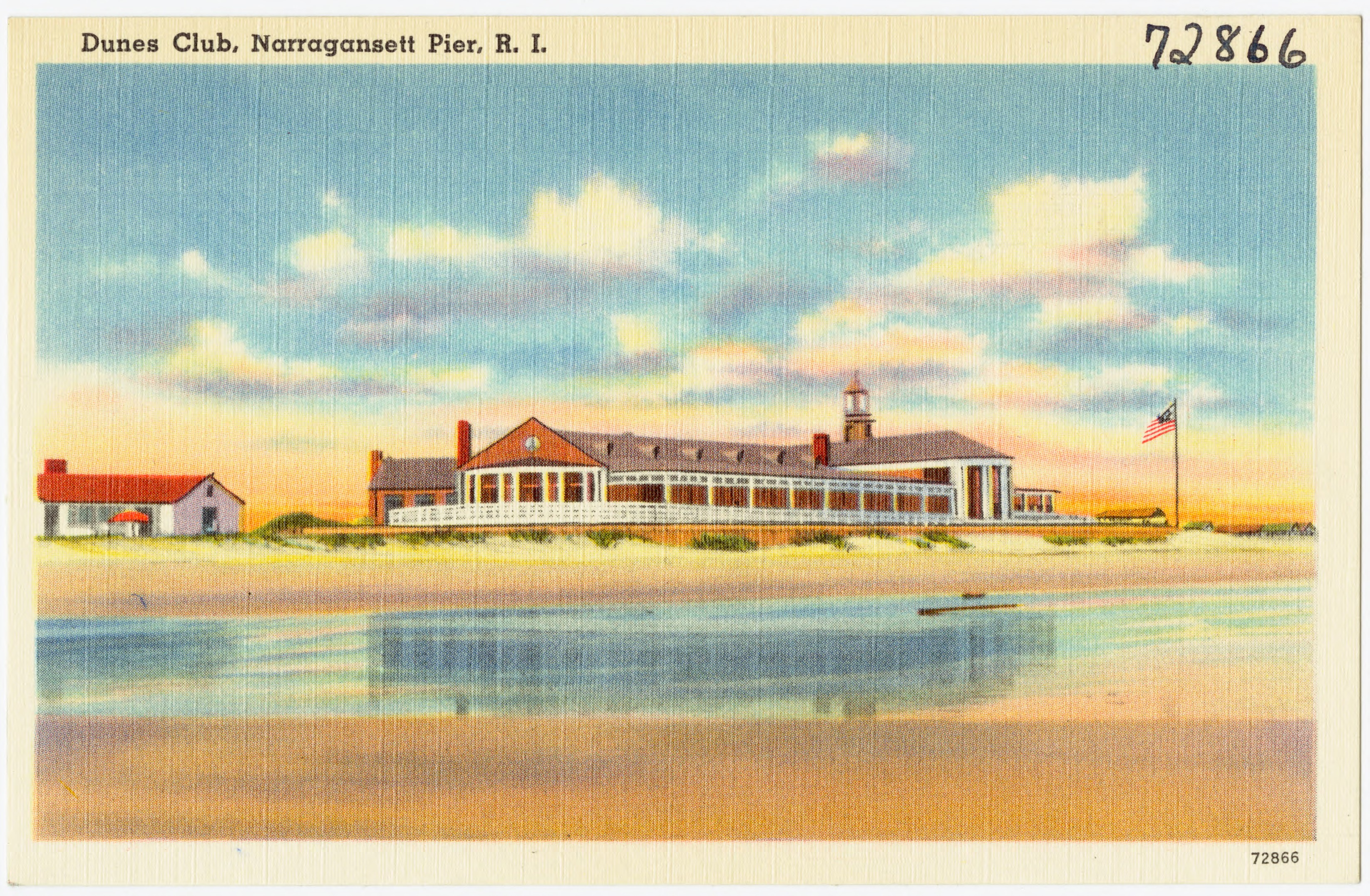
- 1940s postcard view

- Location within Rhode Island Location within the United States
- Location: 137 Boston Neck Road, Narragansett, Rhode Island
- Coordinates: 41°26′24″N 71°26′56″W
- Area: 28 acres (11 ha)
- Built: 1928
- Architect: Murchison, Kenneth M.; Cope, Thomas Pym
- Architectural style: Colonial Revival
- NRHP reference No.: 15000243
- Added to NRHP: May 18, 2015

The Dunes Club is a historic private beach club at 137 Boston Neck Road in Narragansett, Rhode Island. The club occupies 28 acres (11 ha) of land fronting Narragansett Bay in central Narragansett, bounded on the north by the Pettaquamscutt River.

== History ==
The Dunes Club's centerpiece is a large rambling Colonial Revival clubhouse designed by Thomas Pym Cope and built in 1939, after the first clubhouse (built 1928-29 to a design by club member Kenneth Murchison), was washed away by the New England Hurricane of 1938. The only element of the club's original buildings to survive that hurricane is its gatehouse. The club's facilities include tennis courts and cabanas.

The club was listed on the National Register of Historic Places in 2015.

On 18 May 2016 around 6:30 p.m., an SUV crashed into the gatehouse at the entrance of the club. Steve Sterling, the manager of the club, as well as his wife and his teenage son Erik, were inside at the time but were unharmed. The house sustained significant structural damage as well as water damage.

== Facilities and amenities ==
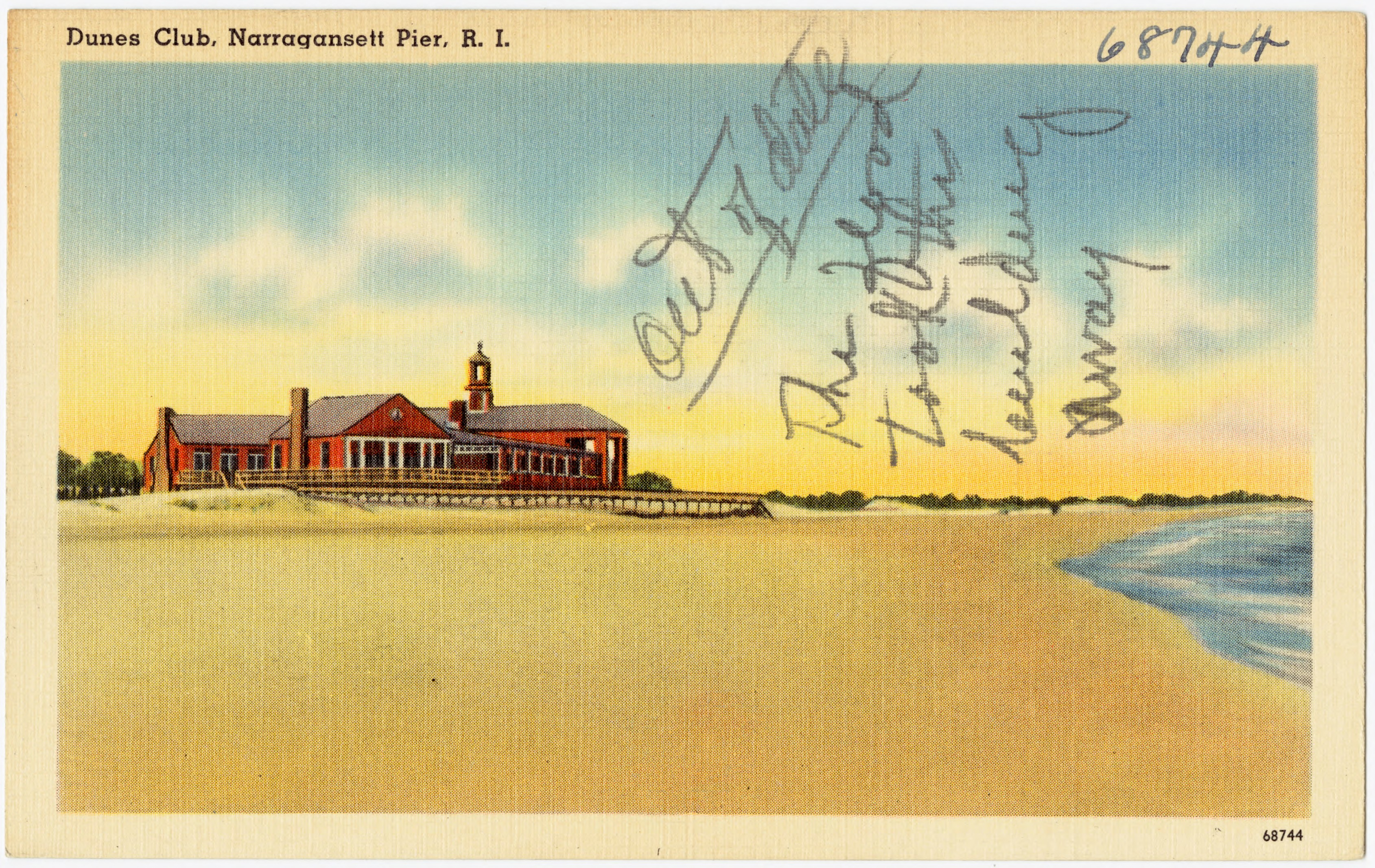
Postcard showing the present clubhouse.

The Dunes Club consists of a main clubhouse, which includes a gift shop, formal dining hall with a stage and dance floor, indoor/outdoor formal bar, tea room used for small formal events, casual restaurant with deck dining, restrooms, kitchens and staff offices and living quarters. From the north side entrance of the clubhouse or through the parking lot is access to a casual snack bar offering lunch foods as well as ice cream, an outdoor snack bar, a casual outdoor food service, deck, pool, children's pool and two bars. Further down are the member bathhouses, which are small units for storing chairs and umbrellas, and the headquarters of the bathhouse staff who carry chairs and umbrellas for members. Located in proximity to the beach is the first aid center, where medical supplies are stored, and the children's camp, a day camp for those ages 4 and older. Further down and closer to Narrow River are member cabanas. These are small rooms with ground-level porches that have chairs and tables for relaxation and dining as well as storage for chairs, umbrellas and surfboards. These are staffed by two cabana stations, and cabana lease holders have access to a special cabana menu that changes daily. Bordering the parking lot and Narrow River, respectively, are eight clay tennis courts. Adjoining the asphalt courts is the pro shop, which sells rackets, balls, and other tennis equipment to members. A tennis pro and multiple instructors are employed each summer to offer private lessons, group clinics, and day camps for children.

== List of presidents ==
1. T. Pierrepont Hazard (1929–1941)
2. Henry B. Spencer (1942–1954)
3. Caryl Roberts (1954–1955)
4. Robert O. Lord (1955–1959)
5. John E. C. Hall (1959–1961)
6. R. Henry Field (1961–1963)
7. Darius L. Goff (1963–1967)
8. George C. Davis (1967–1971)
9. George S. Squibb (1971–1988)
10. James S. Smith (1988–1992)
11. Edward O. Ekman (1992–1996)
12. James M. Seed (1996–2001)
13. Michael McMahon (2002–2006)
14. Sarah Dowling (2007-2010)
15. Benjamin McCleary (2011-2015)
16. Robert Flanders (2016-2020)
17. William Kapos (2021-)

== See also ==
- National Register of Historic Places listings in Washington County, Rhode Island
