= Druidsdream =

Historic house in Rhode Island, United States

- U.S. National Register of Historic Places
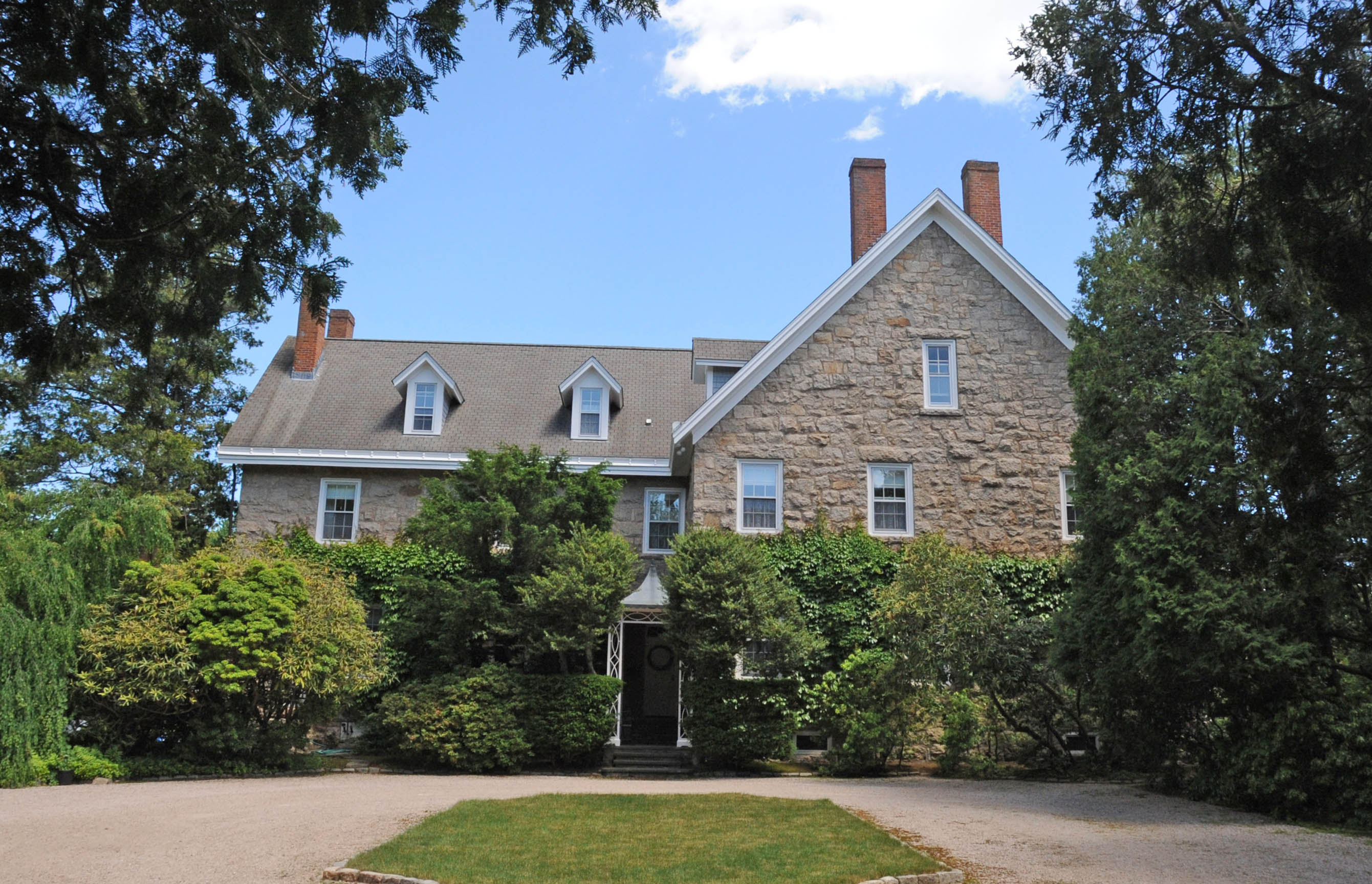

- Location within Rhode Island Location within the United States
- Location: Narragansett, Rhode Island
- Coordinates: 41°25′2″N 71°27′46″W
- Area: 1 acre (0.40 ha)
- Built: 1884
- Architect: Champlin, Henry Peace; Congdon, Alfonso
- Architectural style: Colonial Revival, Gothic Revival
- NRHP reference No.: 89000940
- Added to NRHP: July 20, 1989

Druidsdream is a historic house at 144 Gibson Avenue in Narragansett, Rhode Island. It is a 2 1/2-story stone structure, completed in 1884. It was built, probably by predominantly Narragansett stonemasons, for Joseph Hazard, a locally prominent landowner and botanist. It has a cross-gable plan, with its main facade divided into three bays and looking south over landscaped grounds. The central bay has a slightly projecting pavilion, with the second-floor bays filled with French doors and iron railings.

The house was listed on the National Register of Historic Places in 1989.

== See also ==
- National Register of Historic Places listings in Washington County, Rhode Island
