= Greene Inn =

- U.S. National Register of Historic Places
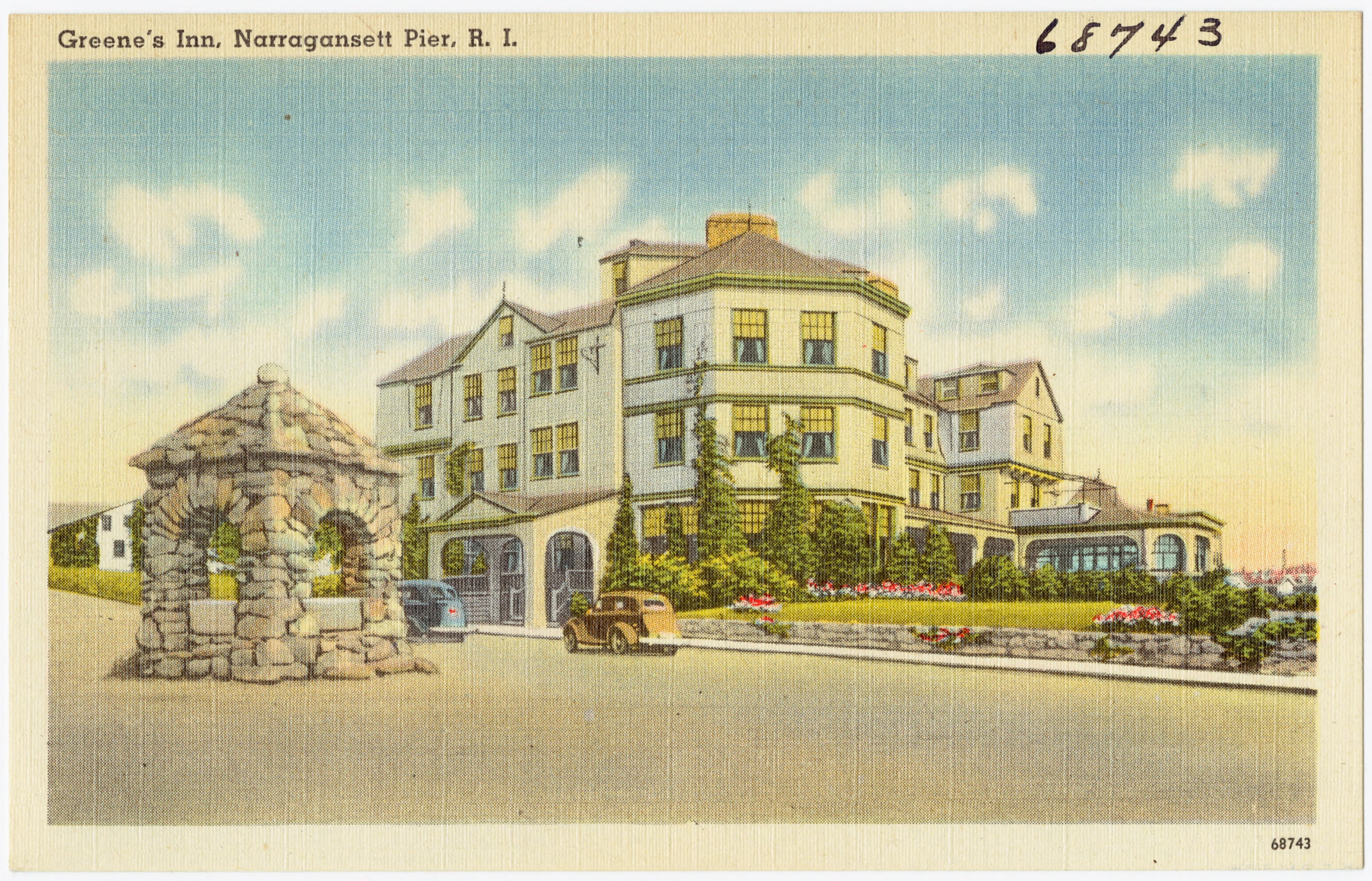
- 1930s postcard view

- Location within Rhode Island Location within the United States
- Location: Narragansett, Rhode Island
- Coordinates: 41°25′23″N 71°27′23″W
- Built: 1887; 139 years ago
- Architect: Preston, William Gibbons
- Architectural style: Shingle Style
- NRHP reference No.: 76000009
- Added to NRHP: June 24, 1976

The Greene Inn (also known as Green Inn or Greene's Inn) was a historic summer resort hotel at 175 Ocean Road in Narragansett, Rhode Island.

The shingle style inn was built in 1887 to a design by William Gibbons Preston and added to the National Register of Historic Places in 1976. It was designed as a year-round facility in what was then a seasonal summer resort area, with steam heat piped to its rooms. It originally including facilities for stabling up to 100 polo ponies.

The hotel closed in 1975. The inn was used as a set for the television film The House of Mirth in 1979. It was destroyed by a fire in 1980, and condemned in 1981.

== See also ==
- National Register of Historic Places listings in Washington County, Rhode Island
