= Towers Historic District =

Historic district in Rhode Island, United States

- U.S. National Register of Historic Places
- U.S. Historic district
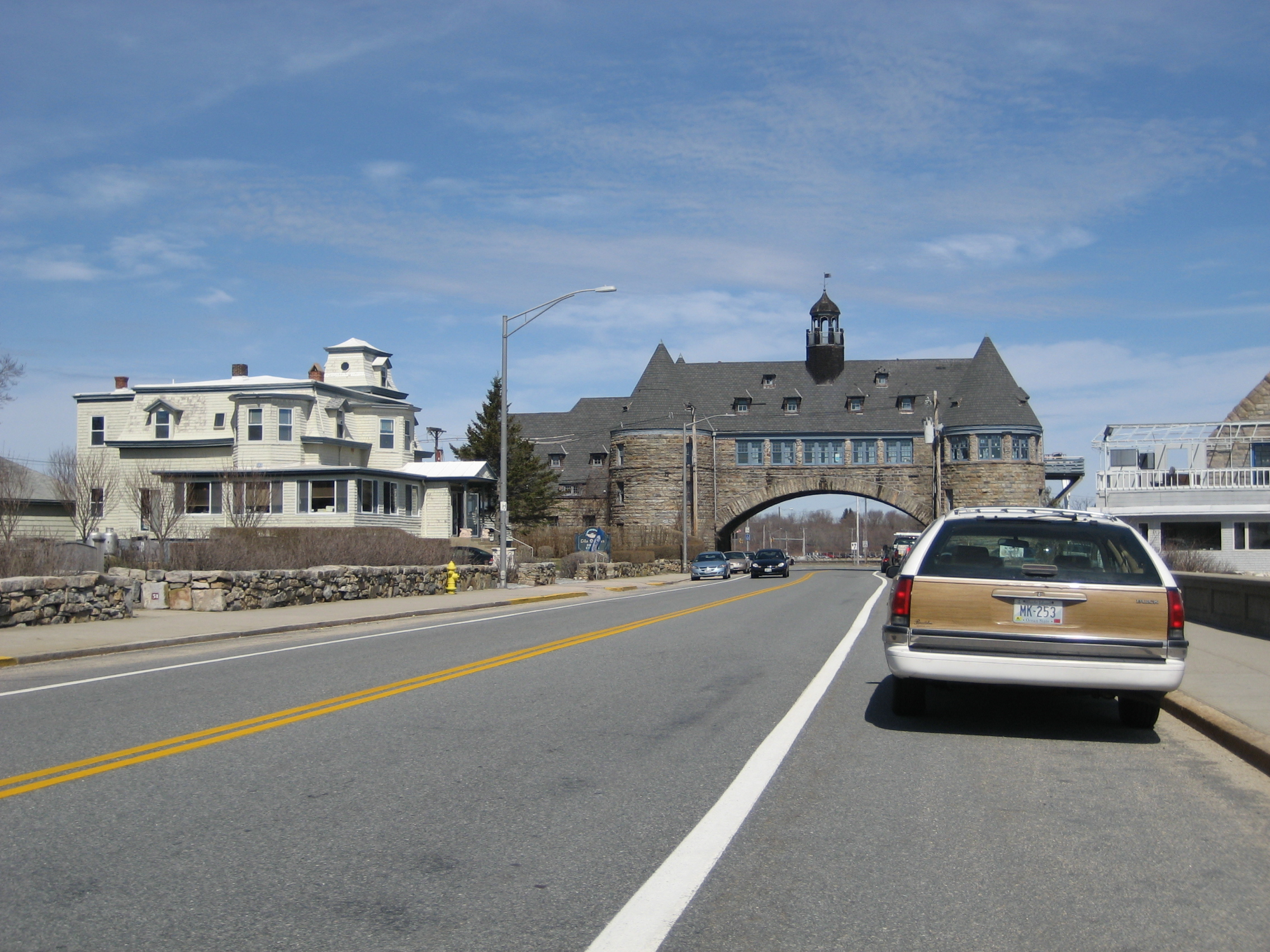

- Location within Rhode Island Location within the United States
- Location: Narragansett, Rhode Island
- Architect: McKim, Mead & White; William Gibbons Preston
- Architectural style: Late 19th And Early 20th Century American Movements, Federal
- MPS: Narragansett Pier MRA
- NRHP reference No.: 82000021
- Added to NRHP: August 18, 1982

The Towers Historic District is a historic district in Narragansett, Rhode Island, encompassing a city block bounded by the Atlantic Ocean, Exchange Place, Mathewson and Taylor Streets. It is centered on The Towers, the surviving remnant of the Narragansett Casino, built 1883-86 to a design by McKim, Mead & White. This area was always near the center of resort-oriented development in Narragansett from the mid-19th century on, including four summer cottages on Taylor and Mathewson Streets built in the 1860s and 1870s. Most of the casino was destroyed by fire in 1900, leaving its stone towers, and the nearby Coast Guard station, also designed by McKim, Mead & White. The oldest building in the district is an 1822 2 1/2-story house at 18 Mathewson Street.

The district was added to the National Register of Historic Places in 1982.

== See also ==
- National Register of Historic Places listings in Washington County, Rhode Island
