= Central Street Historic District (Narragansett, Rhode Island) =

Historic district in Rhode Island, United States

- U.S. National Register of Historic Places
- U.S. Historic district
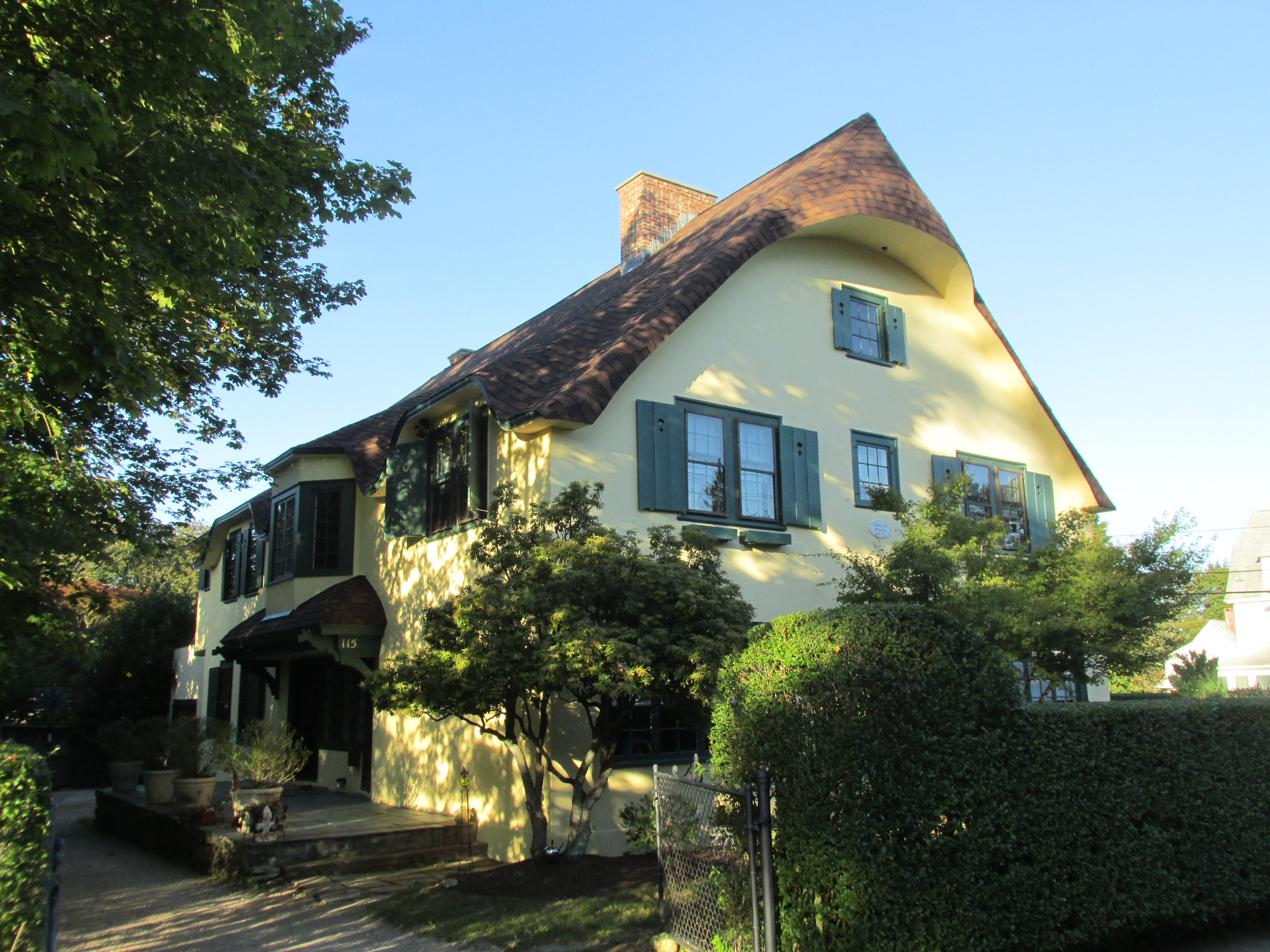
- Yellow Patch

- Location within Rhode Island Location within the United States
- Location: Narragansett, Rhode Island
- Coordinates: 41°25′46″N 71°27′44″W
- Area: 23 acres (9.3 ha)
- Architectural style: Colonial Revival, Bungalow/Craftsman, Late Victorian
- MPS: Narragansett Pier MRA
- NRHP reference No.: 82000015
- Added to NRHP: August 18, 1982

The Central Street Historic District of Narragansett, Rhode Island is a historic district on both sides of Central Street from Fifth Avenue to Boon Street in Narragansett. It encompasses a collection of well-preserved summer houses built for the most part between 1880 and the 1920s, as well as the traditional civic core of the town. The area is characterized by smaller wood-frame homes, generally either 1-1/2 or 2 1/2 stories in height, set on small lots. It includes three church buildings (some still in use for religious purposes), all of which were built between 1870 and 1900, and the former Fifth Avenue School, which now serves as Narragansett's town hall.

The district was listed on the National Register of Historic Places in 1982.

== See also ==
- National Register of Historic Places listings in Washington County, Rhode Island
