= Gardencourt =

Historic house in Rhode Island, United States

- U.S. National Register of Historic Places
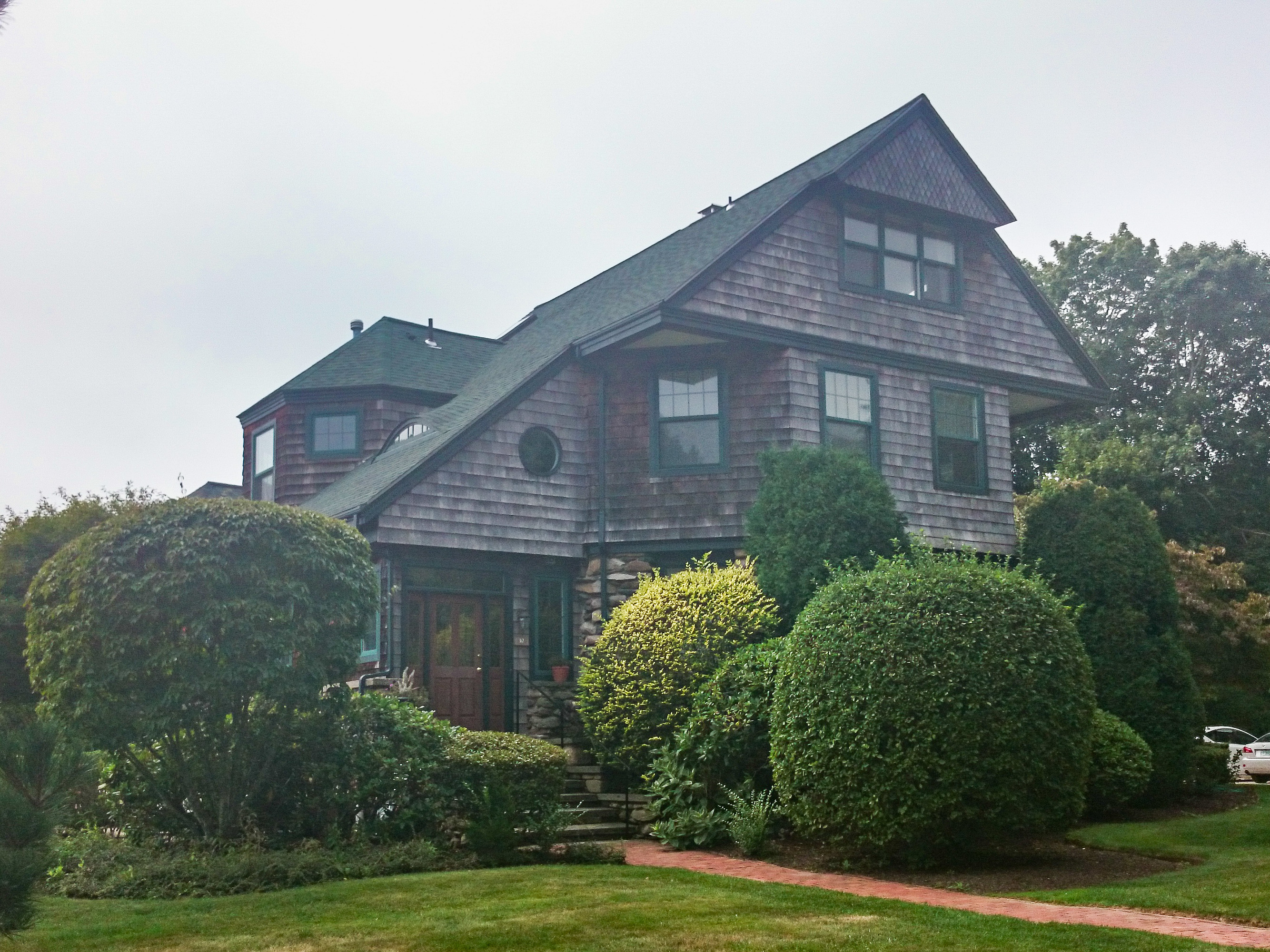
- Gardencourt

- Location within Rhode Island Location within the United States
- Location: Narragansett, Rhode Island
- Coordinates: 41°25′21″N 71°27′39″W
- Built: 1888
- Architect: Preston, William Gibbons
- Architectural style: Shingle Style
- MPS: Narragansett Pier MRA
- NRHP reference No.: 82000018
- Added to NRHP: August 18, 1982

Gardencourt is an historic home at 10 Gibson Avenue in Narragansett, Rhode Island.

The house was designed by William Gibbons Preston in Shingle style and built for businessman Charles E. Pope in 1888. It was added to the National Register of Historic Places in 1982. The first floor is built of large fieldstone, with a wood-frame shingled second floor. The roof is gabled, descending to the first floor to shelter a (now enclosed) porch. The roof is pierced by a small eyebrow window. A two-story wing extends to the south of the building.

Preston designed Gardencourt as one of a group of five structures, but the others were never built. However, the historic house is now encompassed by the Gibson Court condominium complex, consisting of several similarly styled buildings constructed in 1987.

== See also ==
- National Register of Historic Places listings in Washington County, Rhode Island
