= Roberta Dunbar =

American clubwoman and peace activist

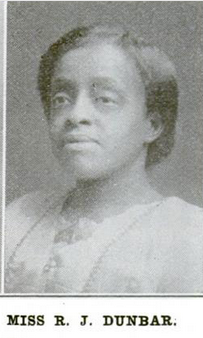
Roberta J. Dunbar, in a 1917 publication.

Roberta Johnson Dunbar (died November 1, 1956) was an American clubwoman and peace activist based in Rhode Island. Her first name is sometimes written "Reberta" in sources.

== Early life ==
Roberta Johnson Dunbar was born at Narragansett Pier, Rhode Island, the daughter of Daniel and Louisa (Cartwright) Dunbar.

== Career ==
From 1902 through 1905, and again in 1931, Roberta J. Dunbar was president of the Northeastern Federation of Colored Women's Clubs, a body of the National Association of Colored Women (NACW).

In 1913, Dunbar was elected as a founding officer of the Providence, Rhode Island branch of the National Association for the Advancement of Colored People. She was also president of the Working Girls Club in Providence.

In 1928. Dunbar was serving as president of the Rhode Island Federation of Colored Women's Clubs. Dunbar chaired the NACW's Peace Department in the 1930s. She addressed the organization's 1937 national convention in Fort Worth, Texas on the topic, saying "We women want peace, and no woman of any nation is in a better position to bring this Era than the women of America."

In 1950, she was elected by the Women's Newport League to be their delegate to the national NACW convention in Atlantic City.

== Personal life ==
Dunbar died in 1956, at the Home for Aged Colored People in Providence.

== See also ==
- List of peace activists
