= Point Judith Light =

Lighthouse in Rhode Island, United States

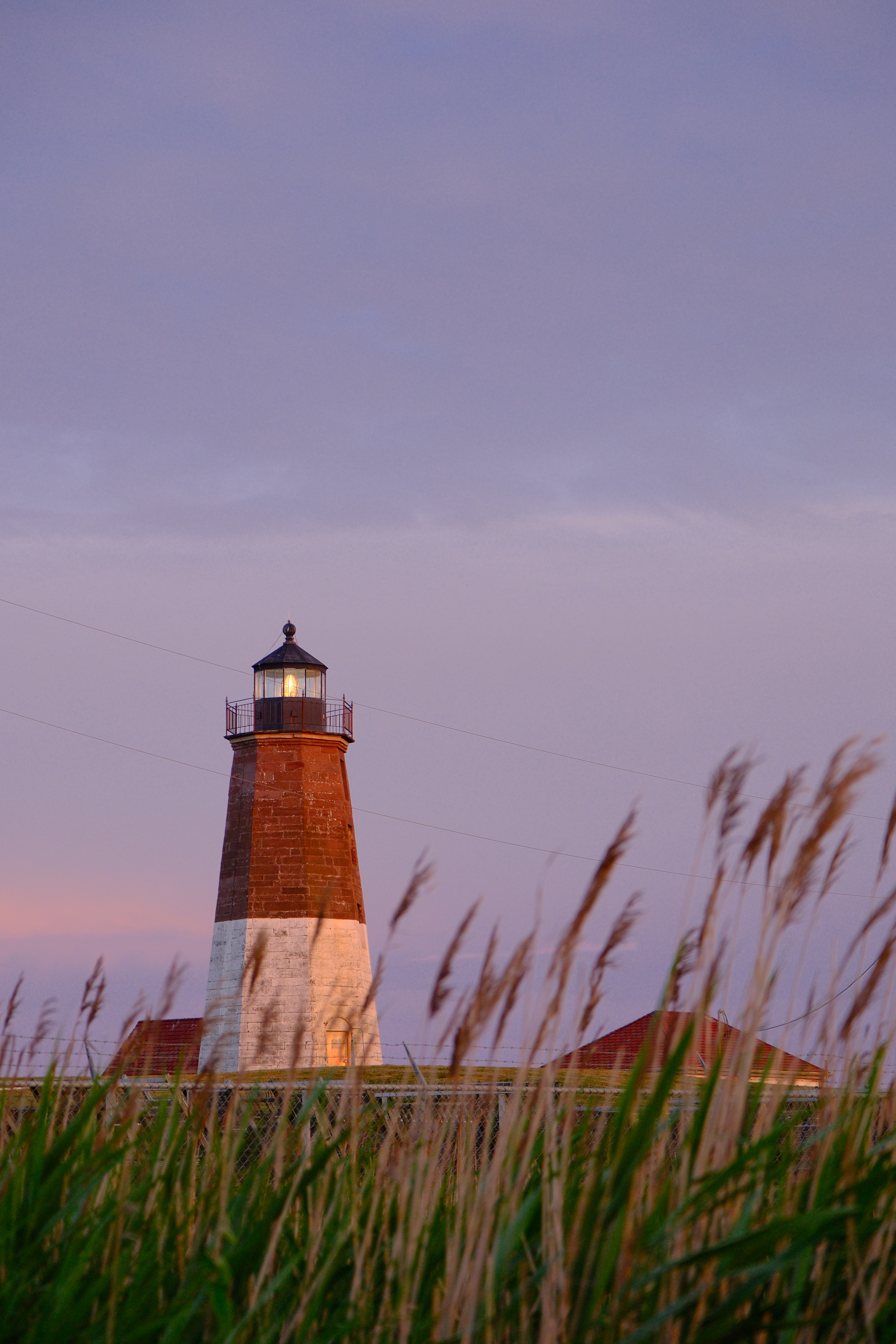
- Point Judith Light in June 2023
- Location: Narragansett, Rhode Island
- Coordinates: 41°21′39.7″N 71°28′53″W

Tower
- Constructed: 1810
- Foundation: Granite blocks
- Construction: Granite blocks
- Automated: 1954
- Height: 51 feet (16 m)
- Shape: Octagonal conical
- Markings: Lower half, white upper half, brown Black lantern
- Heritage: National Register of Historic Places listed place
- Fog signal: Horn, 1 blast every 15 seconds

Light
- First lit: 1857
- Focal height: 65 feet (20 m)
- Lens: Fourth order Fresnel lens
- Range: 16 nautical miles (30 km; 18 mi)
- Characteristic: Occulting 3 white 15 seconds 5s on, 2s off; 2s on, 2s off; 2s on, 2s off
- Point Judith Lighthouse
- U.S. National Register of Historic Places
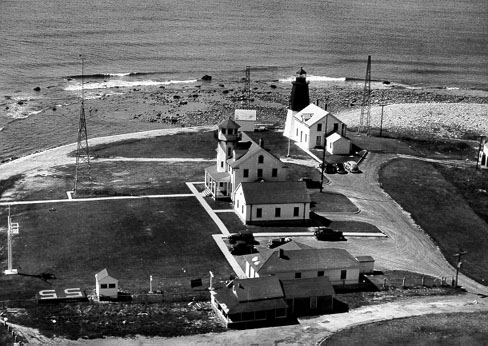
- Built: 1857
- MPS: Lighthouses of Rhode Island TR
- NRHP reference No.: 88000279
- Added to NRHP: March 30, 1988

Point Judith Light is located on the west side of the entrance to Narragansett Bay, Rhode Island as well as the north side of the eastern entrance to Block Island Sound. The confluence of two waterways make this area busy with water traffic and the waters around Point Judith are very cold and dangerous. Historically, even with active lighthouses, there have been many shipwrecks off these coasts.

Point Judith Light
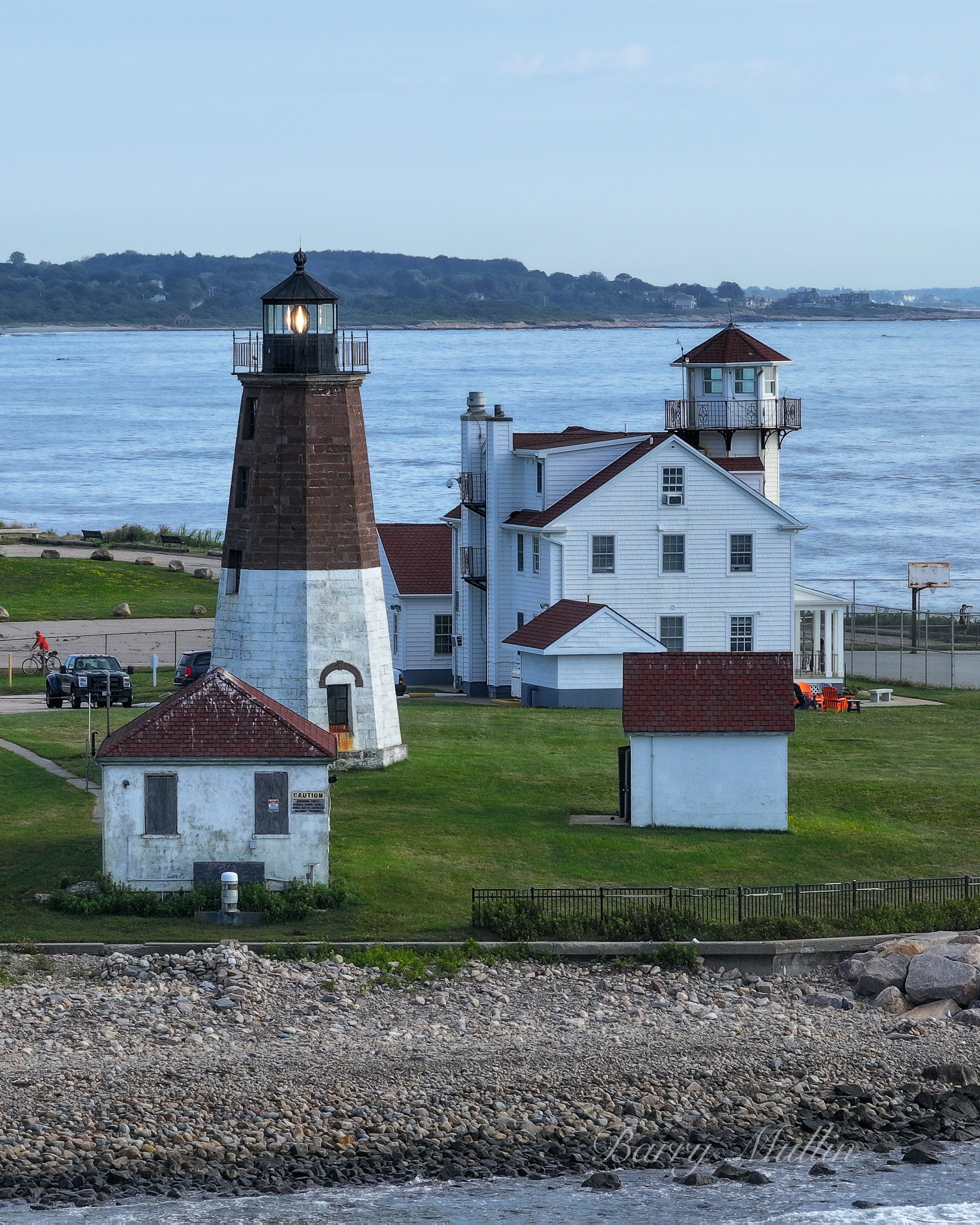
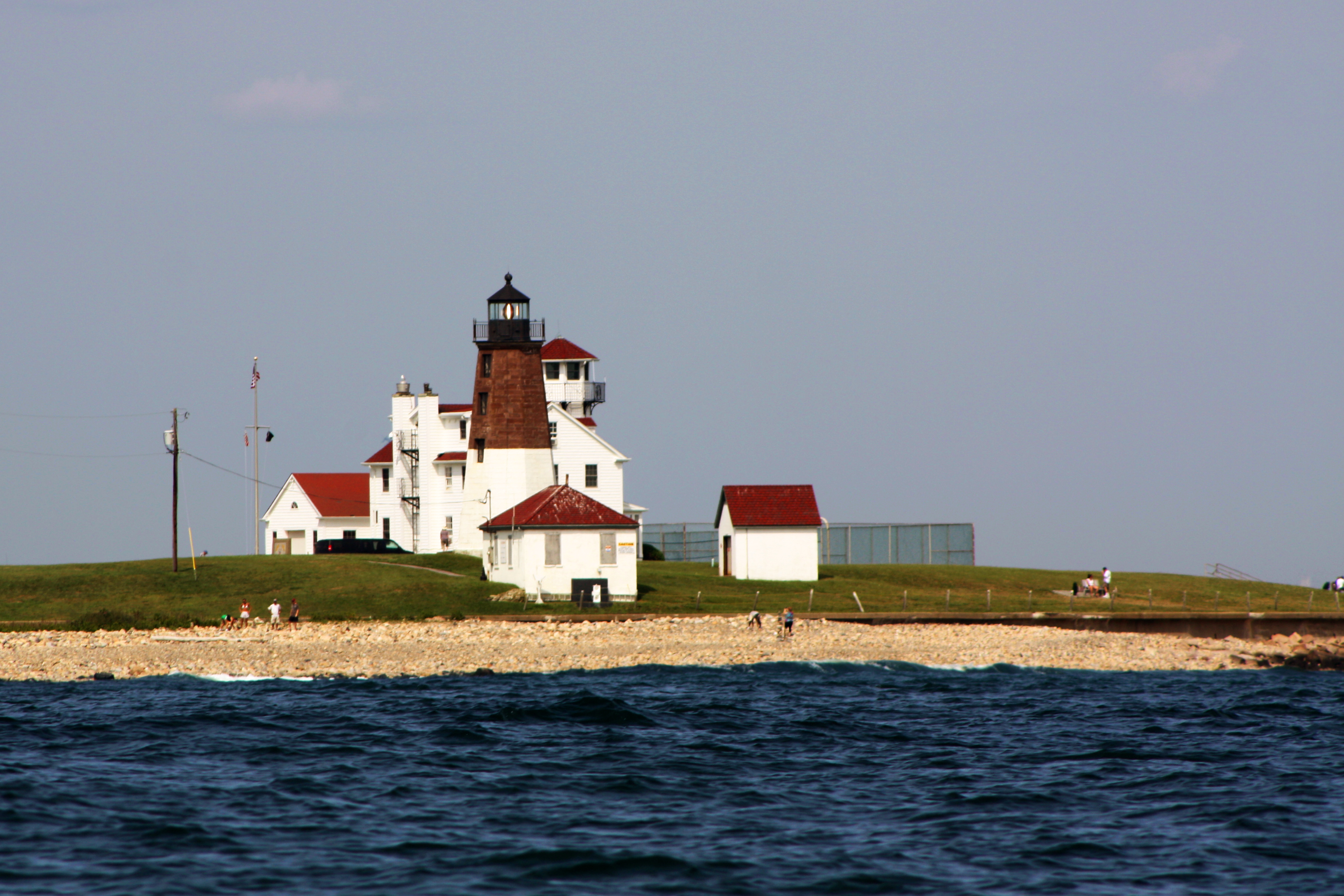
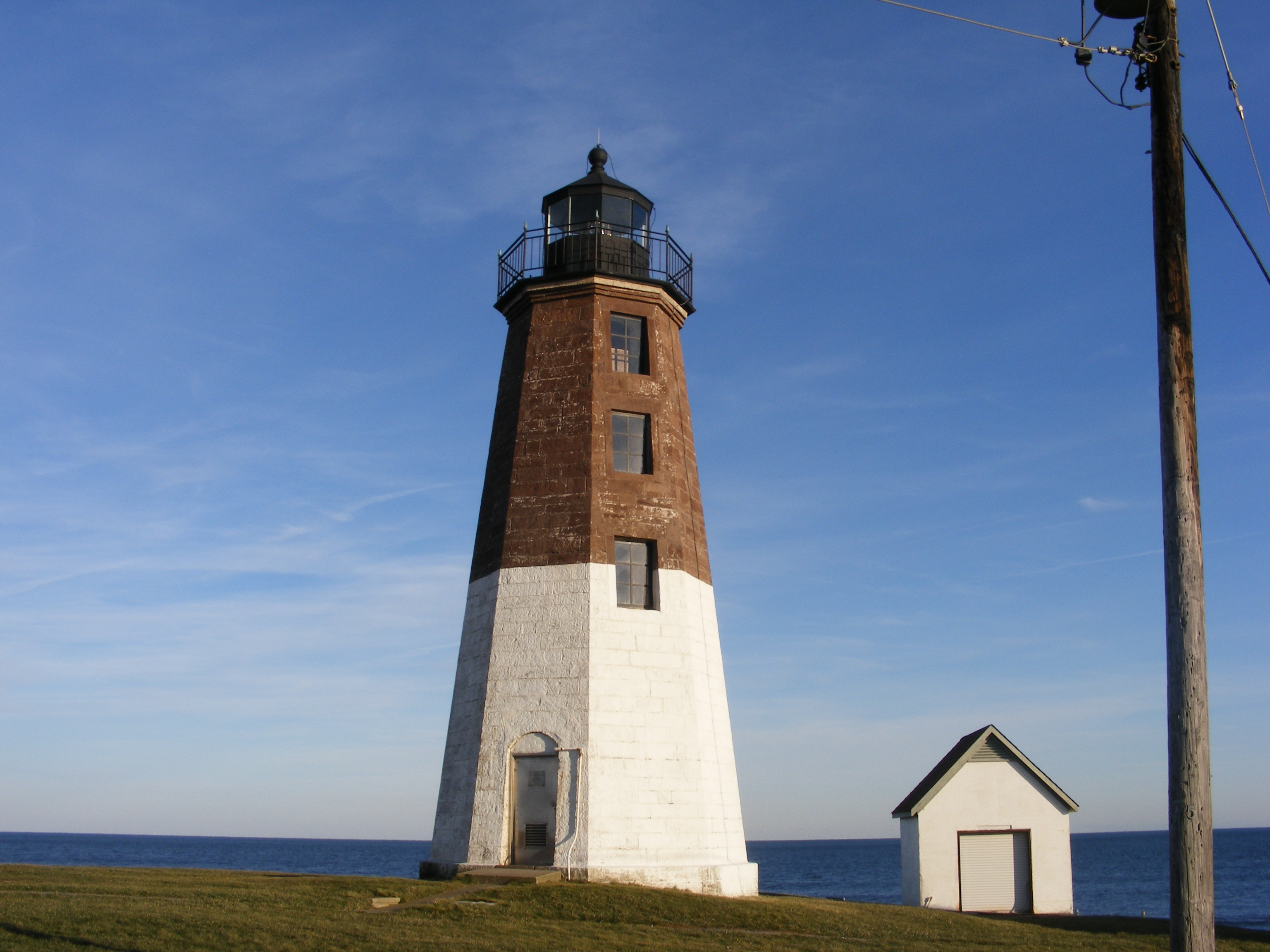

Three light structures have been built on this site. The original 35-foot (11 m) tower, built in 1810, was destroyed by a hurricane in 1815. It was replaced in 1816, by another 35-foot stone tower with a revolving light and ten lamps. The present octagonal granite tower was built in 1856. The upper half of the tower is painted brown and the lower half white to make the light structure a more effective daymark for maritime traffic. In 1871, ship captains asked that Point Judith's fog signal be changed from a horn to whistle. This change distinguished the Point Judith light from the Beavertail Lighthouse, which used a siren to announce fog. A whistle could also be heard more distinctly over the sounds of the surf in the area. Point Judith Light was automated in 1954, and was listed on the National Register of Historic Places in 1988.

== See also ==
- National Register of Historic Places listings in Washington County, Rhode Island
