= Narragansett Baptist Church =

Historic church in Rhode Island, United States

- U.S. National Register of Historic Places
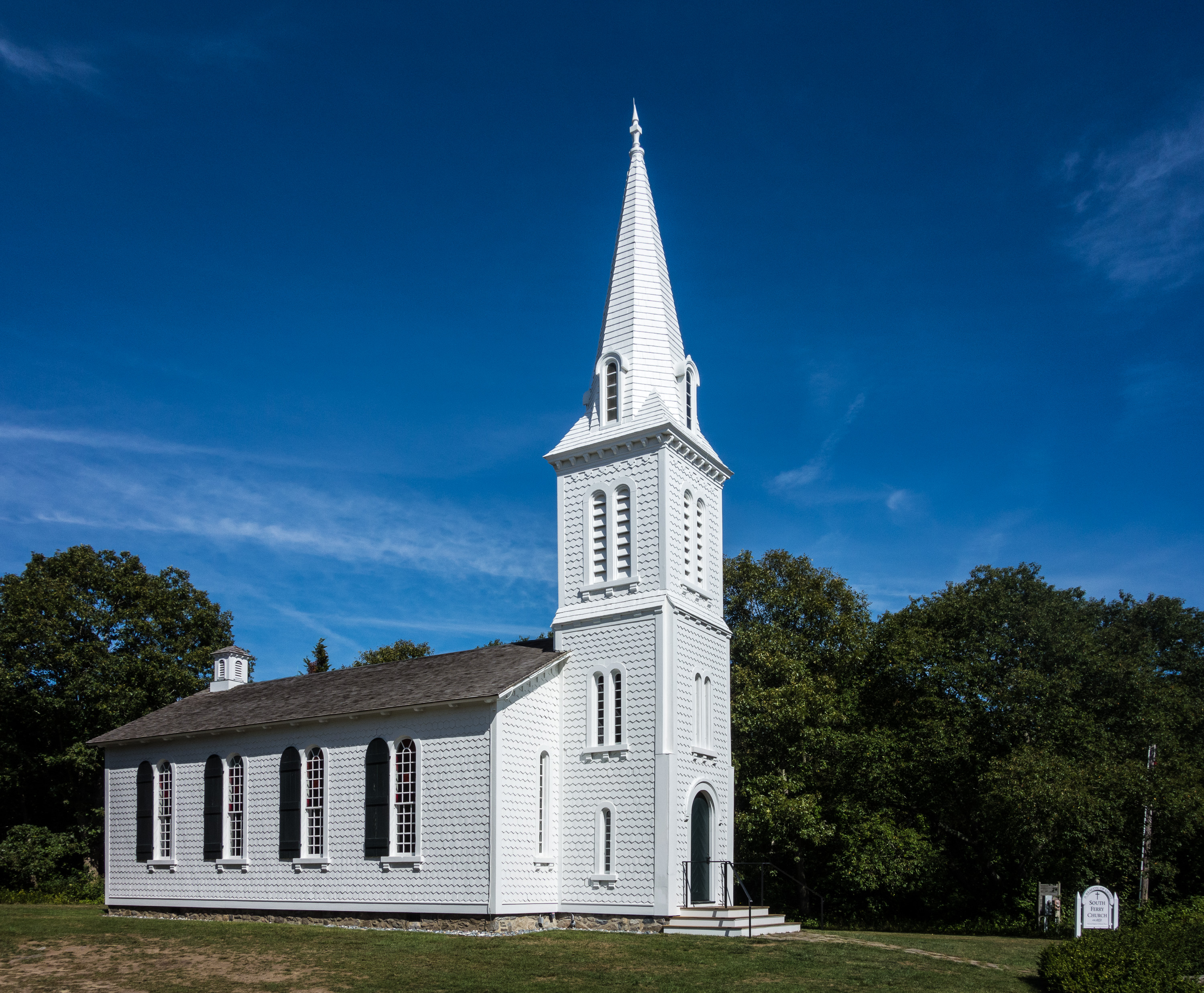
- Narragansett Baptist Church

- Location within Rhode Island Location within the United States
- Nearest city: Narragansett, Rhode Island
- Coordinates: 41°29′34″N 71°25′34″W
- Built: 1850
- Architect: Tefft, Thomas A.
- Architectural style: Carpenter Gothic
- NRHP reference No.: 77000010
- Added to NRHP: November 25, 1977

Narragansett Baptist Church (also known as South Ferry Church) is an historic Baptist church building located at 170 South Ferry Road, in Narragansett, Rhode Island.

== History ==
The wooden church was designed by Thomas A. Tefft in the Carpenter Gothic style, and built in 1850.

South Ferry was a thriving textile village in the mid-nineteenth century, but by 1908 the Baptist congregation moved to a building 1 mile away.

The South Ferry Memorial Society acquired and maintained the building for the next 65 years.

The building was extensively repaired after suffering damage during the Hurricane of 1938. In 1974 the University of Rhode Island received title to the property, and the building is currently maintained by a private non-profit, Friends of the South Ferry Church.

The church building was added to the National Register of Historic Places in 1977.

== Images ==
Sign identifying the church and its status as a historic place.

== See also ==
- National Register of Historic Places listings in Narragansett, Rhode Island
