= Dunmere (Narragansett, Rhode Island) =

Historic house in Rhode Island, United States

- U.S. National Register of Historic Places
- U.S. Historic district
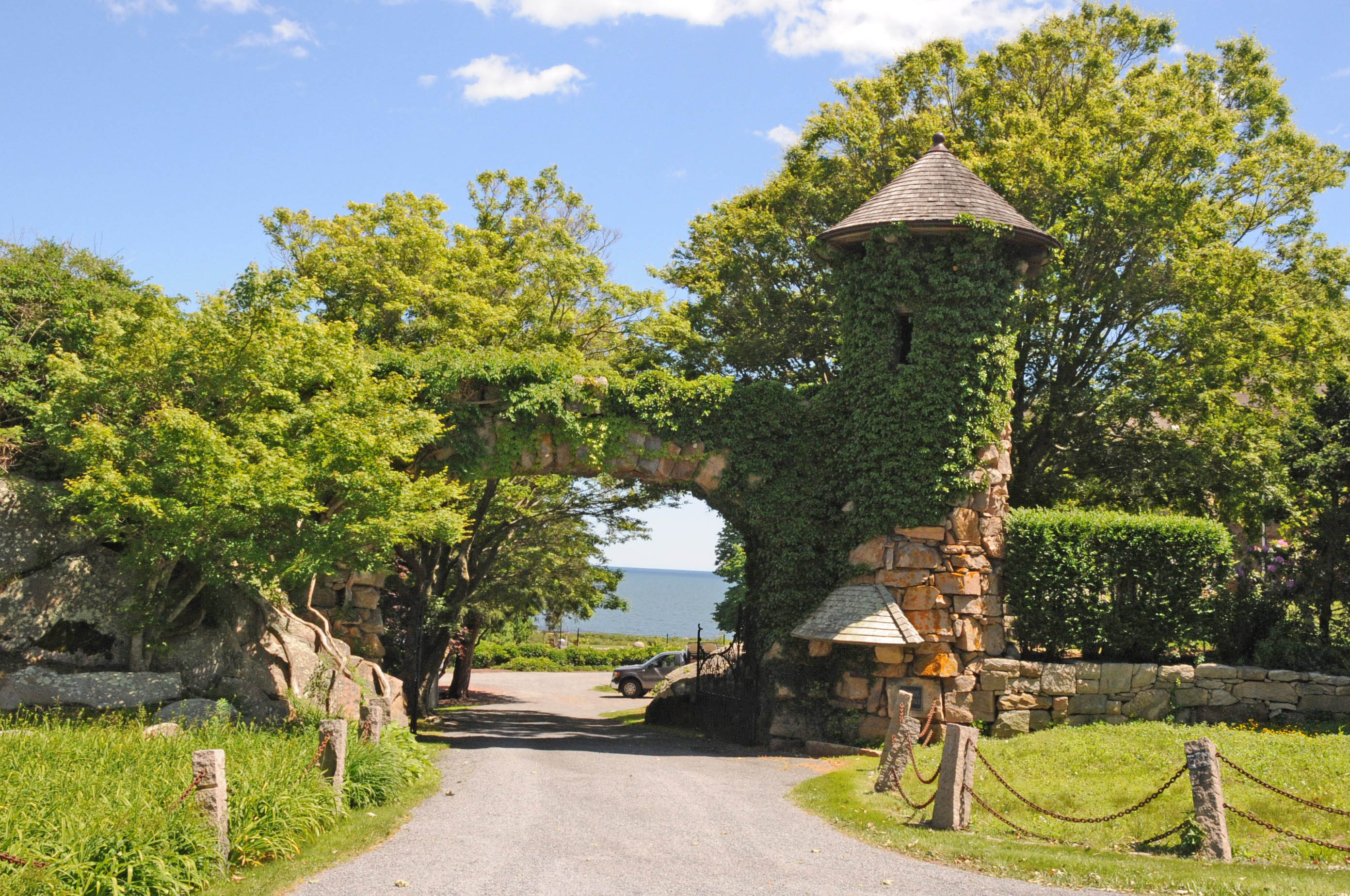

- Location within Rhode Island Location within the United States
- Location: Narragansett, Rhode Island
- Coordinates: 41°24′16″N 71°27′44″W
- Area: 3.4 acres (1.4 ha)
- Built: 1883
- Architect: Merrick, John M.; et al.
- Architectural style: Stick/Eastlake, Queen Anne
- NRHP reference No.: 05001061
- Added to NRHP: September 23, 2005

Dunmere is a historic estate at 560 Ocean Road in Narragansett, Rhode Island.

The estate, which originally included a 3 1/2-story Queen Anne/Stick style residence, gatehouse, and other buildings, was designed by John M. Merrick and was built in 1883. Dunmere was commissioned by Robert G. Dun (of Dun and Bradstreet fame) and served as his summer home until his death. It consisted of 13 acres (5.3 ha) with 500 feet (150 m) of ocean frontage. Major buildings included the main home, located close to the ocean, The Gardener's Cottage, located atop the hill, overlooking the property, the stable and the impressive stone archway, traversing Dunmere's entrance gates. In addition to a mosaic swimming pool and vast gardens, Dunmere featured a man-made pond on the waterfront. Following a massive fire at the main house, the property has since been split into three residential properties. Only the Gardener's Cottage and entrance gates remain standing today.

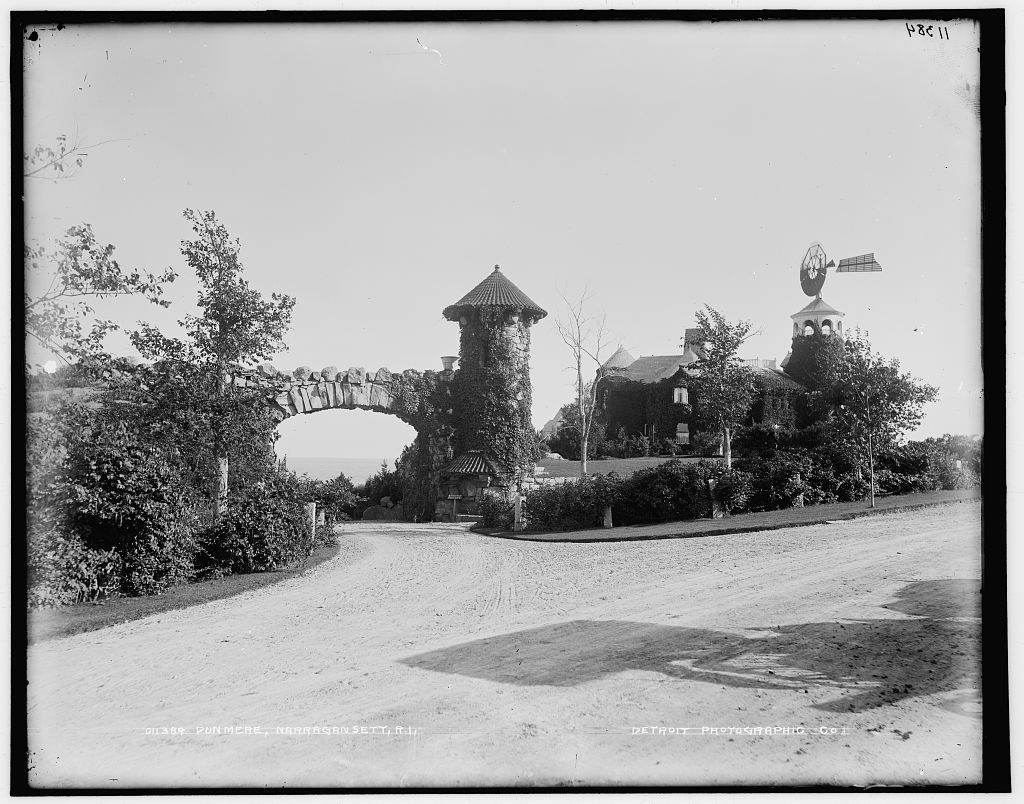
Archway on the Dunmere estate, taken between 1900 and 1906

The Gardener's Cottage, gate and garden are the principal elements of the estate that remain today. The unique entry, a rough stone masonry arch with turret and wrought iron gates, is situated slightly east of Ocean Road on the shore of the Atlantic Ocean. Above and to its south stands the Gardener's Cottage, a granite masonry building with Romanesque and Queen Anne features. The cottage sits high on a large stone outcropping about 150 feet from Ocean Road. Narragansett Bay is 600 feet to the east of the building. This area also includes garden terraces, fountains, an artificial lake, two gazebos, a stone-arched bridge, stone retaining walls and a shingled stable block. The estate once included a 3/4-story Eastlake and Queen Anne shingled and clapboard mansion, a large greenhouse complex, and a billiard room and bowling alley, which have since been demolished or destroyed by fire. The carriage house, now located on a separate lot, has been converted into a residence.

The flower gardens on the upper terrace were laid out in a formal plan with intersecting paths and stairways to the lower terraces. A Victorian star-shaped flower bed was once located on the lower terrace, now replaced with lawn. A small ornamental stone bridge gives access to the granite ledges along the shoreline. Some of these features appear to have been added or updated after 1900, although the principal design features from the late 1880s remain, including the stone boundary walls.

Remnants of the support base for an iron fishing stand used by Dun for bass fishing are present near the water's edge. A service/recreation complex of greenhouses, billiard room and bowling alley formerly stood on the north side of the garden terrace along with the carriage house and stable block, behind a stone retaining wall. This wall forms the northern boundary of the property.

The large entrance gate to the estate is an elliptical, rough-cut granite arch with a small turret on the south side. On the north side of the gate, massive blocks of rough-cut, randomly coursed granite extend outward from a large natural granite outcrop to form the arch. On the opposite (south) side is a thirty-four foot tower. The uppermost level of the tower is corbeled. Above the corbeling of the tower are wooden brackets which support the rafters of the tower's conical roof. Originally, the roof was red terracotta tile, but at some unknown time these were replaced with wood shingles. Granite steps spiral around the exterior of the tower ending in a walkway across the arch to the granite ledge on the other side. Originally, the tower featured gargoyles with wrought iron lanterns hanging from their mouths. Within the wrought iron work of the large, hinged gates is the name of the estate, "Dunmere," in decorative script.

The Gardener's Cottage, as it was historically known, is a complexly massed, granite masonry and wood-frame building with three major components. The original part of the building is a forty-three-foot, conical-roof tower of modified cylindrical, bottle-like form, constructed in 1883 as the estate's water tower. In 1889, a substantial dwelling for the gardener was added onto the east side of the water tower. This alteration corresponds with the expansion of the estate gardens at the same time and the relocation and reconstruction of several other estate outbuildings, including the greenhouses and carriage house. The building has compact wings covered by hip roofs, anchored by a massive, granite central chimney. The hip roof over the west wing, connecting to the water tower, has a lower pitch and originally had a flat-deck widow's walk surrounded by a balustrade.

The cottage features a variety of wings, bays, towers, and decorative elements. Fourteen granite steps, carved in a shelf of exposed ledge in the 1880s, lead upward to the primary entrance to the Gardener's Cottage from the garden terraces below. At the top of this staircase is a series of cobblestone terraces.

The building's towers and the main portion of the house are a mixture of rough-cut, rock-faced, pink and gray granite. All of the windows have heavy granite sills and lintels. The base of the former water tower is granite. As the tower rises, it changes from masonry to shingled wooden construction at the roof line of the attached central block of the cottage. The top of the tower had Romanesque arch openings with turned railings on the inside, below which was a double belt course of fish-scale shingles. Old photographs show the tower originally had a bell-shaped roof with a double gable balcony in the Eastlake style attached to the second story. The balcony was incorporated into the roof line of the gardener's cottage when it was built in 1889. It is not known when it was completely removed.

Originally, a large, circular windmill was located on top of the tower roof to draw water from a well 180 feet below ground up to a cistern located in the second story of the tower. The water was gravity-fed from this location to the greenhouses, main house, carriage house and fountains below. The windmill was rebuilt after the 1938 hurricane, but when it was blown down again in the 1954 hurricane, it was not replaced.

The asymmetrical front (south) elevation of the gardener's cottage, facing the garden, has a projecting wing with rounded corners near the center, a cylindrical tower at each end, and a large, rounded arch for the front entranceway located between the front (south) wing and water (west) tower. An oriel window above the entrance is built of rough faced granite. The base of the oriel window is also the keystone for the entrance arch. To the right of the door, within the arch, is a Romanesque double-hung window with a fleur-de-lis design. Both the rounded arch of the window and the sill are granite. On the first floor of the front wing are three pairs of triple-sash windows with Queen Anne details. Above, the second floor includes a projecting gable containing a triplet of double-hung, Queen Anne style windows, flanked by two, tiny, square, single-sash windows on each side. There is a corbel cornice along much of the roofline on this facade, and on the east tower as well.

The surviving elements of the estate were listed on the National Register of Historic Places in 2005.

It remains privately owned as of 2025.

== See also ==
- National Register of Historic Places listings in Washington County, Rhode Island
