= Narragansett Pier, Rhode Island =

Census-designated place in Rhode Island, United States

- CDP
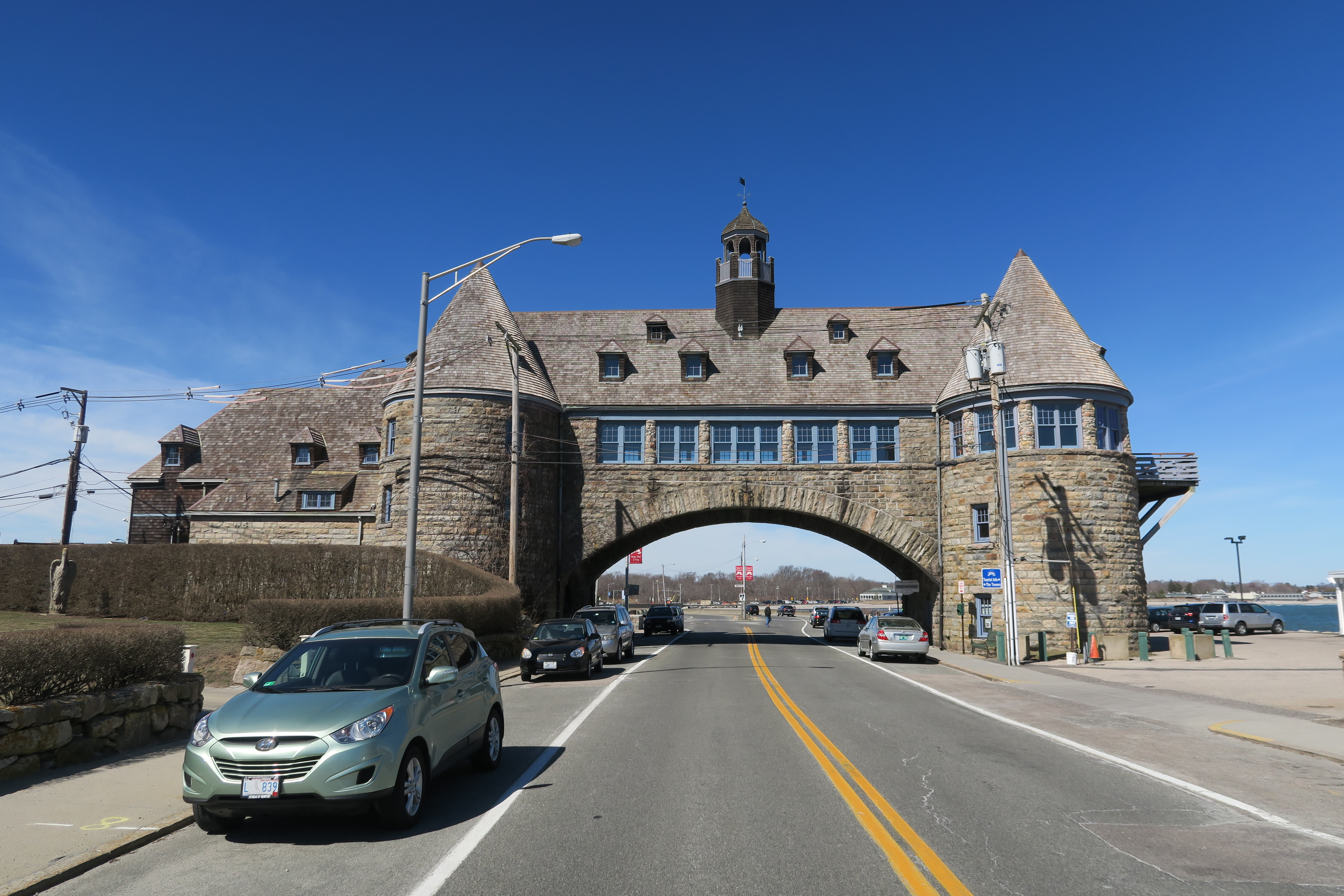
- The Towers

- Location in the state of Rhode Island
- Coordinates: 41°25′48″N 71°27′59″W
- Country: United States
- State: Rhode Island
- County: Washington

Area
  - Total: 4.09 sq mi (10.59 km^{2})
  - Land: 3.57 sq mi (9.24 km^{2})
  - Water: 0.52 sq mi (1.35 km^{2})
- Elevation: 3.3 ft (1 m)

Population (2020)
  - Total: 3,308
  - Density: 927.4/sq mi (358.09/km^{2})
- Time zone: UTC-5 (Eastern (EST))
  - Summer (DST): UTC-4 (EDT)
- FIPS code: 44-48700
- GNIS feature ID: 1219895

Narragansett Pier is an unincorporated village and a census-designated place (CDP) in the town of Narragansett, Rhode Island, United States. As of the 2020 census, Narragansett Pier had a population of 3,308. It is named after the Narrangansett nation.

== Geography ==
Narragansett Pier is located at 41°25′48″N 71°27′59″W (41.429928, -71.466410).

According to the United States Census Bureau, the CDP has a total area of 10.2 km^{2} (3.9 sq mi), of which 9.4 km^{2} (3.6 sq mi) is land and 0.8 km^{2} (0.31 sq mi) (8.12%) is water.

== Demographics ==
Historical population
Census	Pop.	Note	%±
2020	3,308		—
U.S. Decennial Census

=== 2020 census ===
As of the 2020 census, Narragansett Pier had a population of 3,308. The median age was 56.6 years. 9.9% of residents were under the age of 18 and 33.2% of residents were 65 years of age or older. For every 100 females there were 90.4 males, and for every 100 females age 18 and over there were 88.4 males age 18 and over.

95.6% of residents lived in urban areas, while 4.4% lived in rural areas.

There were 1,596 households in Narragansett Pier, of which 10.0% had children under the age of 18 living in them. Of all households, 38.0% were married-couple households, 21.3% were households with a male householder and no spouse or partner present, and 36.7% were households with a female householder and no spouse or partner present. About 41.9% of all households were made up of individuals and 20.9% had someone living alone who was 65 years of age or older.

There were 2,310 housing units, of which 30.9% were vacant. The homeowner vacancy rate was 1.3% and the rental vacancy rate was 6.6%.

Racial composition as of the 2020 census
Race	Number	Percent
White	3,046	92.1%
Black or African American	34	1.0%
American Indian and Alaska Native	16	0.5%
Asian	61	1.8%
Native Hawaiian and Other Pacific Islander	2	0.1%
Some other race	31	0.9%
Two or more races	118	3.6%
Hispanic or Latino (of any race)	66	2.0%

=== 2000 census ===
As of the 2000 census, there were 3,671 people, 1,745 households, and 886 families residing in the CDP. The population density was 391.5 people /km^{2} (1,014 people/mi^{2}). There were 2,129 housing units at an average density of 227.1 units /km^{2} (588 units/mi^{2}). The racial makeup of the CDP was 94.03% White, 0.87% African American, 1.69% Native American, 1.04% Asian, 0.79% from other races, and 1.58% from two or more races. Hispanic or Latino of any race were 1.88% of the population.

There were 1,745 households, out of which 15.5% had children under the age of 18 living with them, 40.3% were married couples living together, 8.0% had a female householder with no husband present, and 49.2% were non-families. 37.4% of all households were made up of individuals, and 17.1% had someone living alone who was 65 years of age or older. The average household size was 2.08 and the average family size was 2.70.

In the CDP, the population was spread out, with 13.3% under the age of 18, 13.3% from 18 to 24, 24.1% from 25 to 44, 27.2% from 45 to 64, and 22.1% who were 65 years of age or older. The median age was 44 years. For every 100 females, there were 86.3 males. For every 100 females age 18 and over, there were 84.5 males.

The median income for a household in the CDP was $39,918, and the median income for a family was $65,864. Males had a median income of $34,726 versus $29,792 for females. The per capita income for the CDP was $26,811. About 8.8% of families and 14.1% of the population were below the poverty line, including 17.0% of those under age 18 and 9.4% of those age 65 or over.

== Notable people ==
- Roberta Dunbar
- Varina Davis, former First Lady of the Confederacy, vacationed here as a widow in the 1890s.
- Varina Anne Davis, Varina Davis' youngest daughter, known as the "Daughter of the Confederacy"; vacationed here with her mother. Died here on September 18, 1898, at the age of 34.
- William Robinson, a deputy governor of the colony during the 1740s
