= The Towers (Narragansett, Rhode Island) =

- U.S. National Register of Historic Places
- U.S. Historic district – Contributing property
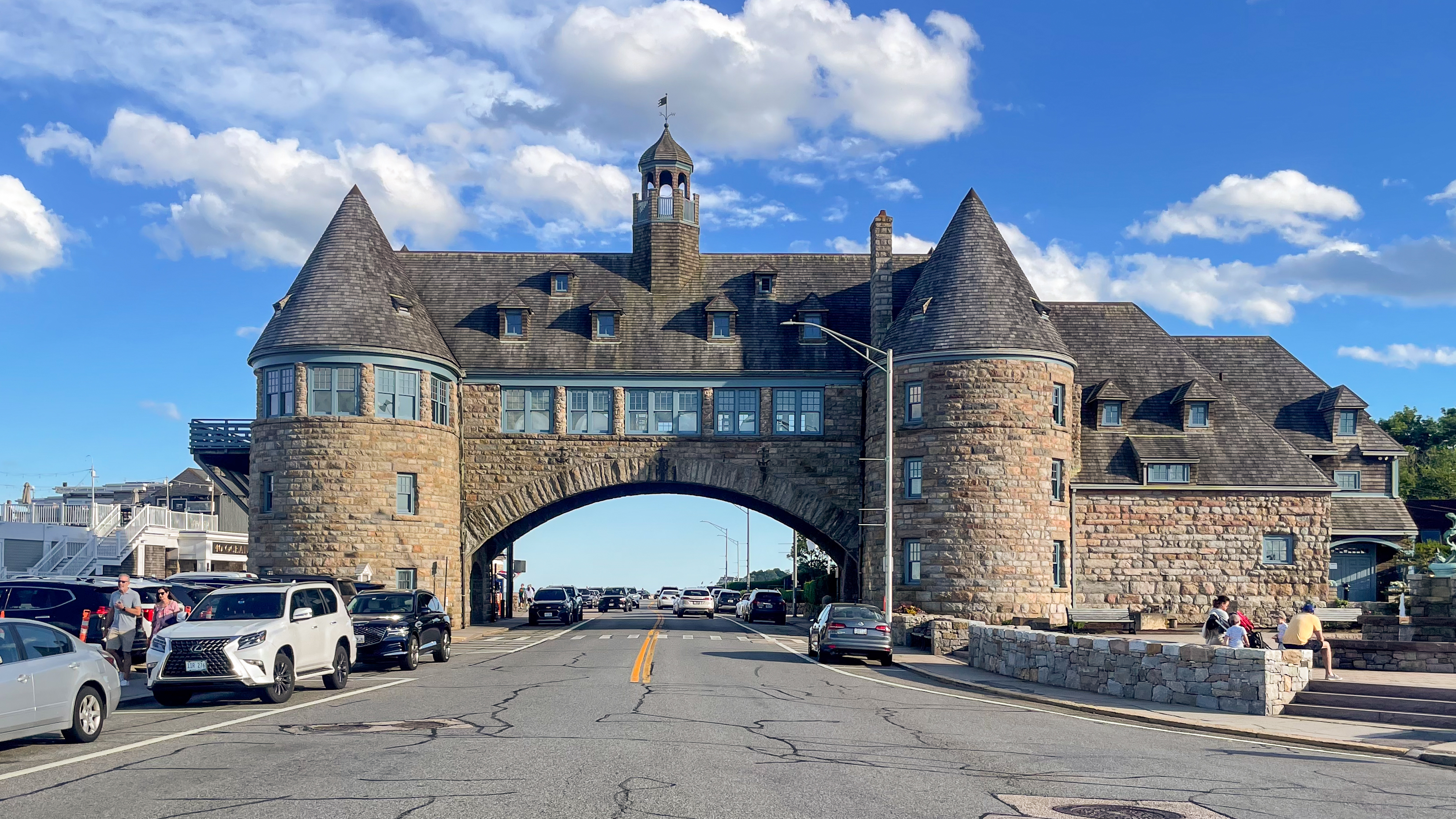
- The Towers in Narragansett, Rhode Island (2024)

- Location within Rhode Island Location within the United States
- Location: 35 Ocean Road, Narragansett, Rhode Island, U.S.
- Coordinates: 41°25′50″N 71°27′22″W
- Built: 1883
- Architect: McKim, Mead, and White
- Part of: Towers Historic District (ID82000021)
- NRHP reference No.: 69000001

Significant dates
- Added to NRHP: November 25, 1969
- Designated CP: August 18, 1982

The Towers is a historic structure located at 35 Ocean Road in Narragansett, Rhode Island. It is the only remnant of the Narragansett Pier Casino built in the 1880s. On November 25, 1969, it was added to the National Register of Historic Places.

== History ==
The Narragansett Pier Casino was the center of social life in Narragansett during the late 19th century. Not a casino in the modern gambling definition, casinos of this era were the central gathering place for social and private communities for games, dancing, parties, and fellowship. The Narragansett Pier Casino rivaled the Newport Casino’s popularity as a resort for the social elite until it burned to the ground in 1900.

Built between 1883 and 1886, the Narragansett Pier Casino was a fine example of Victorian Shingle style architecture (a variation of Queen Anne style architecture in the United States), designed by McKim, Mead, and White. The Casino offered a variety of sports, including boating, tennis, billiards, bowling, cards, and shooting, restaurants, stores, reading rooms, a theater, a bandstand, a ballroom, and a beautiful beach.

The Narragansett Pier Casino thrived during the Gilded Age until it burned down during the Great Fire of September 12, 1900. That day, a fire broke out in the neighboring Rockingham Hotel. The flames spread quickly to the Casino, leaving only the granite walls of The Towers standing. More recently Hurricane Sandy has uncovered the foundation and part of the old boardwalk belonging to the old casino that had been buried by sand.

Today, the Narragansett Towers are the only remaining part of the original Narragansett Pier Casino, having survived a number of fires, nor'easters, and hurricanes. It is one of the most recognizable landmarks in Narragansett. The Towers currently hosts weddings, dances, dinners, plays, and fashion shows. Its location adjacent to Narragansett town beach makes it an ideal venue for social events.

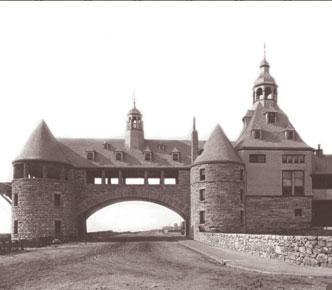
Narragansett towers attached to the casino, ca. 1885

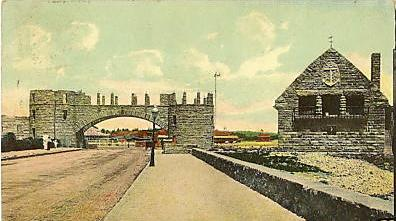
Narragansett Casino ruins and lifeguard station, ca. 1905 after the fire destroyed most of the complex

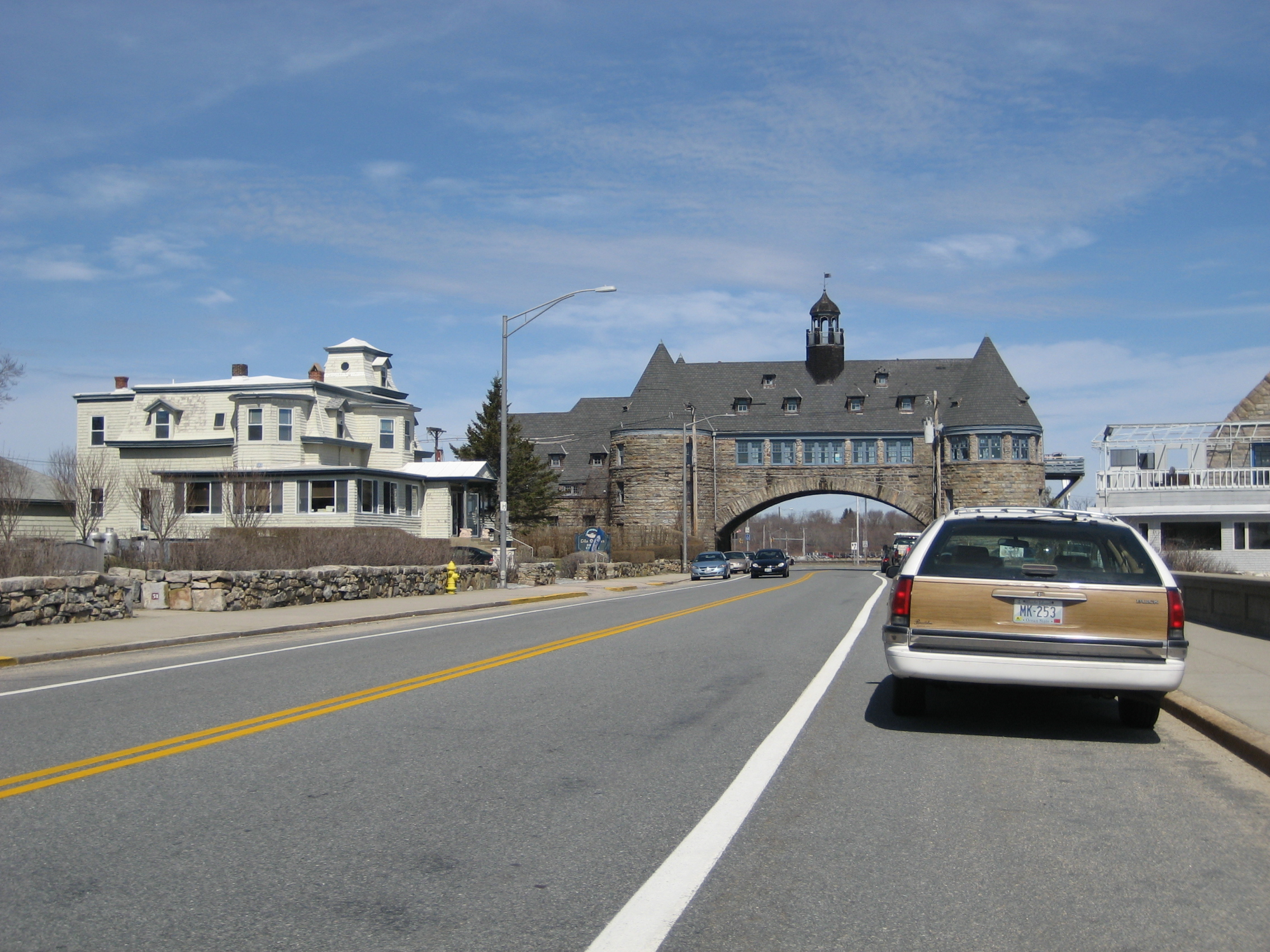

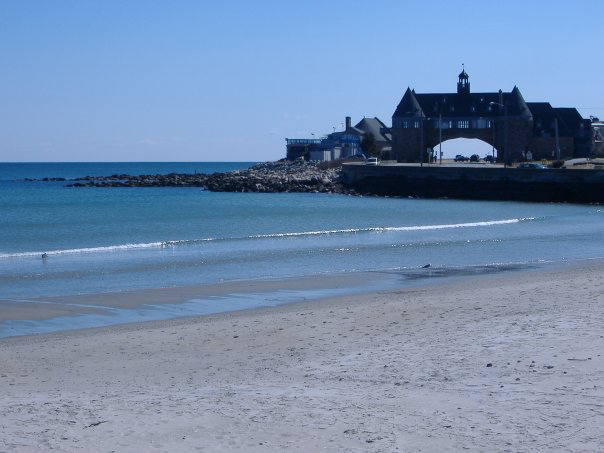

== In popular culture ==
Many events take place on the land adjacent to The Towers, as well as the land next door, where the Casino once stood, that now includes a lawn and a courtyard with a fountain. Events such as The Blessing of the Fleet road race and festival, local art festivals, the Lighting of the town Christmas tree, and many beautiful weddings.

The Casino at the Narragansett Towers is also the location of the first reports of the now-popular seafood dish "clams casino."

The Towers can be seen in the background of the Rhode Island–based cartoon Family Guy, episode "Peter's Got Woods," when Peter rides by on a tandem bicycle with James Woods, both engaged in song.

== See also ==
- National Register of Historic Places listings in Washington County, Rhode Island
