= Rhode Island Route 1A =

State highway in Washington County, Rhode Island, US

Route 1A
- Map (excludes overlaps with US 1)

Route information
- Maintained by RIDOT
- Length: 33.3 mi (53.6 km) Four distinct sections, two of which are bisected by right-in/right-out interchanges

Major junctions
- South end: US 1 in Westerly
- US 1 in Westerly, Charlestown, and South Kingstown; Route 108 in South Kingstown; US 1 in Narragansett; Route 138 in North Kingstown; Route 102 in North Kingstown
- North end: US 1 in North Kingstown

Location
- Country: United States
- State: Rhode Island
- Counties: Washington

Highway system
- Rhode Island Routes
← US 1A	→ Route 1C

Route 1A, largely signed as Scenic 1A, is a 33.3-mile (53.6 km) long numbered state highway located in Washington County, Rhode Island, United States. The route, which parallels U.S. Route 1 (US 1) for its entire length, has four distinct sections connected by US 1, two of which require median u-turn ramps to cross US 1. It travels through five towns in Washington County: Westerly, Charlestown, South Kingstown, Narragansett, and North Kingstown.

Route 1A should not be confused with U.S. Route 1A, which exists north of Route 1A in Providence County, beginning in Warwick and crossing into Massachusetts in Pawtucket, Rhode Island. Not helping matters is the presence of Route 1A shields on US 1A.

== Route description ==
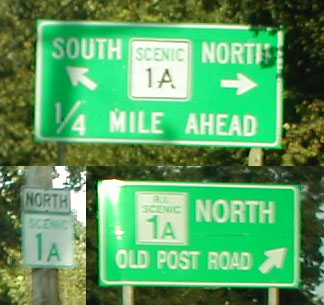
SCENIC 1A signs; the 'R.I. SCENIC 1A' is unique to this sign

Route 1A follows U.S. Route 1 (US 1) closely through Washington County. US 1 is a divided highway for most of its length in this region; there is also a short freeway section in South Kingstown and Narragansett. Because Interstate 95 largely bypasses the main population centers in the southern portion of the state, instead following a more inland routing, US 1 serves as the main thoroughfare. Route 1A, in comparison, runs on surface streets, acting as an alternate route for US 1 that provides access to more local roads and business districts. There are four distinct sections, each separated segments of US 1.

=== Westerly section ===
The first section of Route 1A is 8.1 miles (13.0 km) in length and runs entirely in Westerly. Beginning in downtown Westerly, the roadway takes a more southerly route for its first 3.7 miles (6.0 km) in the town, serving the affluent coastal community of Watch Hill and Misquamicut State Beach. The roadway begins as Main Street, which diverges from US 1 (Broad Street) just after the latter route crosses the Pawcatuck River from Stonington, Connecticut. Route 1A north continues southward on Beach Street before turning south onto Watch Hill Road. The roadway then turns to the southeast along Shore Road, which runs parallel to Misquamicut Beach, Atlantic Beach and Winnapaug Pond, until Shore Road meets Post Road not far from the Charlestown town line.

=== Charlestown and South Kingstown sections ===
The second segment of Route 1A begins 4.1 miles (6.6 km) north of where the first section ends. This segment is 1.4 miles (2 km) in length, begins shortly after Post Road passes Ninigret Pond in Charlestown. The roadway follows Old Post Road in Charlestown past Ninigret National Wildlife Refuge before merging back with the northbound lanes of US 1 / Post Road.

The third section of Route 1A begins just 0.07 miles (0.11 km) north of where the second section ends, with the connection made by way of US 1 north. This section runs for a total of 5.4 miles (8.7 km), though the southernmost 3.2 miles (5.1 km) are separated from rest due to a closed median at US 1. This section follows Old Post Road through Charlestown village and into South Kingstown before re-merging with US 1. This segment serves as a beach bypass, providing access to Charlestown Breachway State Beach, Charlestown Town Beach and Green Hill Beach. This segment also provides access to Route 110, before terminating at US 1 again, this time at the southbound lanes.

=== South Kingstown to North Kingstown section ===
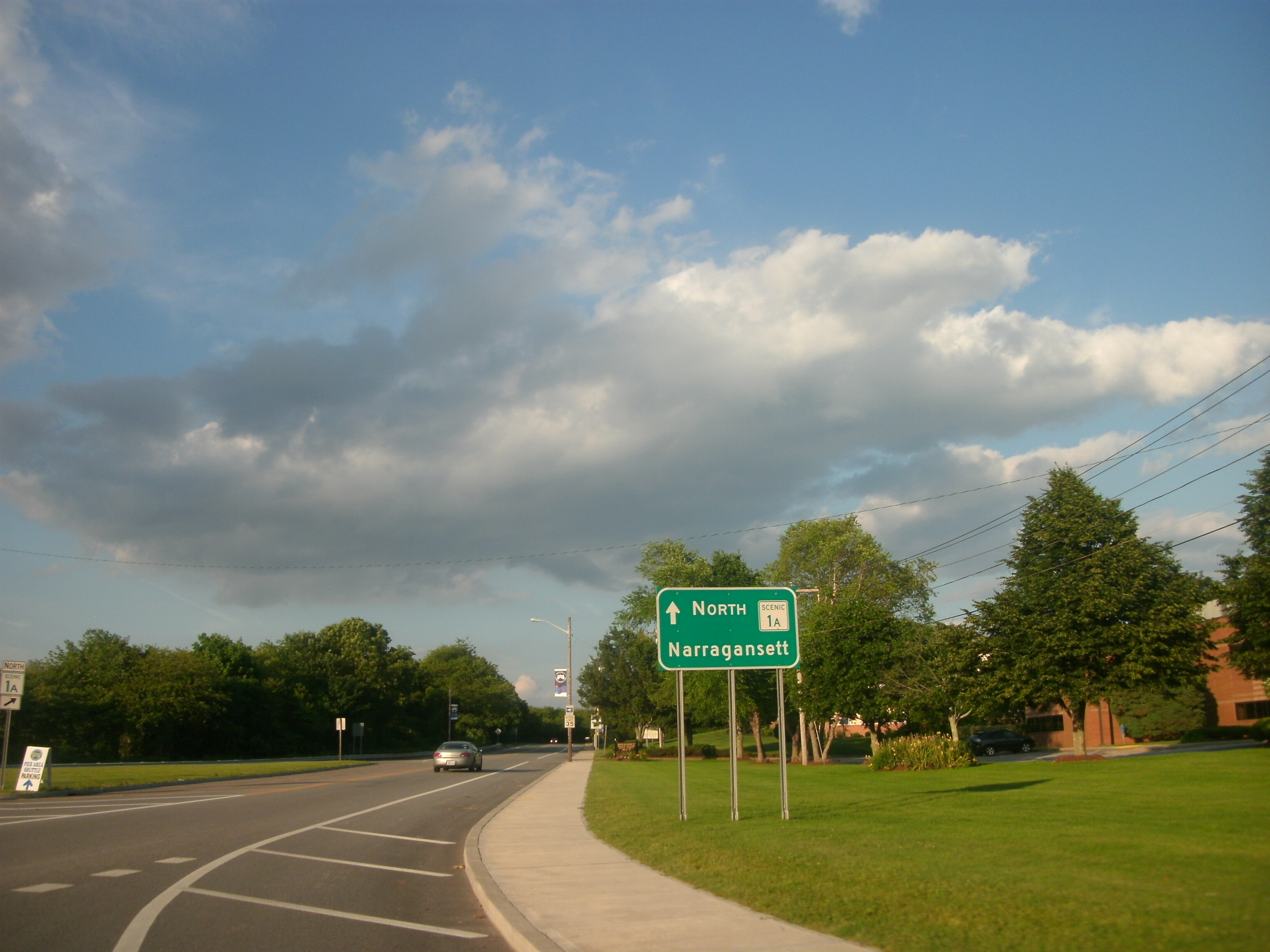
RI 1A Scenic northbound proceeding away from RI 108 in Narragansett

After traveling north for 2.7 miles (4.3 km) on US 1, the fourth section of Route 1A begins, again following Post Road. This section, like the previous one, is split into two by way of a closed median interchange. The portion below this closed interchange is only 1.2 miles (1.9 km) long and barely more than a residential road. It parallels US 1 as a former alignment of the Boston Post Road before reaching the closed interchange. After crossing US 1 via a median u-turn, Route 1A continues north for 16.5 miles (26.6 km), this time taking a more distant course from US 1. This segment runs for 17.2 miles (27.7 km) and serves as a major commercial corridor for the towns of South Kinsgtown, Narragansett, and North Kingstown.

Route 1A runs north and east along Post Road and Main Street into the village of Wakefield, a major commercial center of South Kingstown. Just after exiting downtown Wakefield, the road intersects with Route 108, beginning a 0.7-mile (1.1 km) wrong-way concurrency: Route 1A north and Route 108 south run in a southeasterly direction along Kingstown Road. After entering the town of Narragansett, the concurrent routes partially intersect US 1 at a grade-separated interchange. Just south of the US 1 overpass, Route 108 south and Route 1A north both enter the Dillon (Narragansett) Rotary. Route 108 exits to the south, heading towards the villages of Galilee and Point Judith, while Route 1A exits to the east, heading towards the village of Narragansett Pier.

The 4.4-mile (7.1 km) portion of Route 1A in Wakefield between US 1 and the Dillon Rotary is not actually signed as part of Route 1A on most maps; however, the Rhode Island Department of Transportation (RIDOT) has posted reassurance markers on Post Road, Main Street and Kingstown Road though Wakefield, and the register of state highways indicates that this routing is officially part of Route 1A.

In Narragansett, Route 1A follows Kingstown Road and Narragansett Avenue. When the highway reaches the village of Narragansett Pier, it turns due north onto Beach Street and passes Narragansett Town Beach just north of The Towers. The mainline of Beach Street becomes Boston Neck Road just north of the village center and crosses the Pettaquamscutt River (also known as Narrow River) via the Sprague Bridge. Route 1A serves as a major commercial corridor in northern Narragansett, and also provides access to the village of Bonnet Shores. It then crosses into the Saunderstown neighborhood of North Kingstown, interchanging with Rhode Island Route 138 just west of the Jamestown-Verrazano Bridge. Route 1A heads north for another 3.3 miles (5.3 km) before crossing a branch of Wickford Cove via the Hussey Bridge, entering the village of Wickford. Route 1A turns north onto Brown Street, intersecting with the southern terminus of Route 102. The roadway then turns to the west onto West Main Street before terminating at US 1 just northwest of the main Wickford business district.

== History ==
At various points in time, every segment of Route 1A except the one in Westerly served as part of U.S. 1, which historically was the lower routing of the Boston Post Road mail route. The Route 1A designation came after the U.S. 1 designation was moved to a different alignment. This led to most segments of Route 1A being named Old Post Road or Post Road, while much of US 1 is now named the Commodore Perry Highway.

Before that, Route 1A existed on an alignment that is now roughly Route 3.

The 19.0-mile (30.6 km) segment from old U.S. 1 in downtown Wakefield to current US 1 near Wickford, now most of the fourth section, was once Route 1B. It was renumbered to Route 1A by 1934.

In 2022, one page on the Rhode Island Department of Transportation (RIDOT) website, dedicated to pavement resurfacing projects from 2022 to 2027, referred to part of US 1A (in Warwick, between US 1/Post Road and RI 117/Warwick Avenue) as RI 1A; it is unclear if US 1A has since been re-designated as a northern extension/section of RI 1A. Since around this time, almost all signs on US 1A refer to it as RI 1A. Despite this, two posts on Twitter refer to US 1A (and not RI 1A) in Providence.

In 2023, a repaving project occurred on RI 1A in North Kingstown and Narragansett.

== Major intersections ==
The entire route is in Washington County.

Location	mi	km	Destinations	Notes
Westerly	0.0	0.0	US 1 (Broad Street)	Southern terminus
Westerly	8.8	14.2	US 1	Former Boston Post Road
Gap in route, connection made via 4.1 miles (6.6 km) of US 1 north
Charlestown	0.0	0.0	US 1 north	Right-in/right-out interchange with median u-turns to/from US 1 south
Charlestown	1.4	2.3	US 1 north	Right-in/right-out interchange with median u-turns to/from US 1 south
Charlestown	Gap in route, connection made via 0.07 miles (0.11 km) of US 1 north			
Charlestown	0.0	0.0	US 1 north	Right-in/right-out interchange with median u-turns to/from US 1 south
Charlestown	0.6	0.97	Cross Mills Road	To US 1, Route 2, and Route 112
South Kingstown	3.2 0.0	5.1 0.0	US 1	Right-in/right-out interchange with median u-turns to continue across US 1
South Kingstown	1.8	2.9	Route 110 (Ministerial Road)	
South Kingstown	2.2	3.5	US 1 south	Right-in/right-out interchange with median u-turns to/from US 1 north
South Kingstown	Gap in route, connection made via 2.7 miles (4.3 km) of US 1			
South Kingstown	0.0	0.0	US 1 north	Right-in/right-out interchange with median u-turns to/from US 1 south
South Kingstown	1.2 0.0	1.9 0.0	US 1	Right-in/right-out interchange with median u-turns to continue across US 1
South Kingstown	3.1	5.0	Route 108 north (Kingstown Road) / Old Tower Hill Road to US 1 – Peace Dale	Southern terminus of Route 108 concurrency
Narragansett	3.6	5.8	US 1 – Westerly, Providence	Interchange; access from US 1 north to Route 1A is via Route 108
Narragansett	3.7	6.0	Route 108 south	Dillon Rotary; northern terminus of Route 108 concurrency
Narragansett	6.3	10.1	Sprague Bridge over the Pettaquamscutt River	
Narragansett	9.6	15.4	Bridgetown Road	Former routing of Route 138
North Kingstown	12.5	20.1	Route 138 – Jamestown, Newport, Providence, Westerly	Parclo interchange; to Jamestown-Verrazano Bridge
North Kingstown	15.7	25.3	Hussey Bridge over Wickford Cove	
North Kingstown	15.8	25.4	Route 102 north (Phillips Street) to US 1	Southern terminus of Route 102
North Kingstown	16.5	26.6	US 1	Northern terminus
1.000 mi = 1.609 km; 1.000 km = 0.621 mi: Concurrency terminus; Incomplete access
