= Kenyon's Department Store =

- U.S. National Register of Historic Places
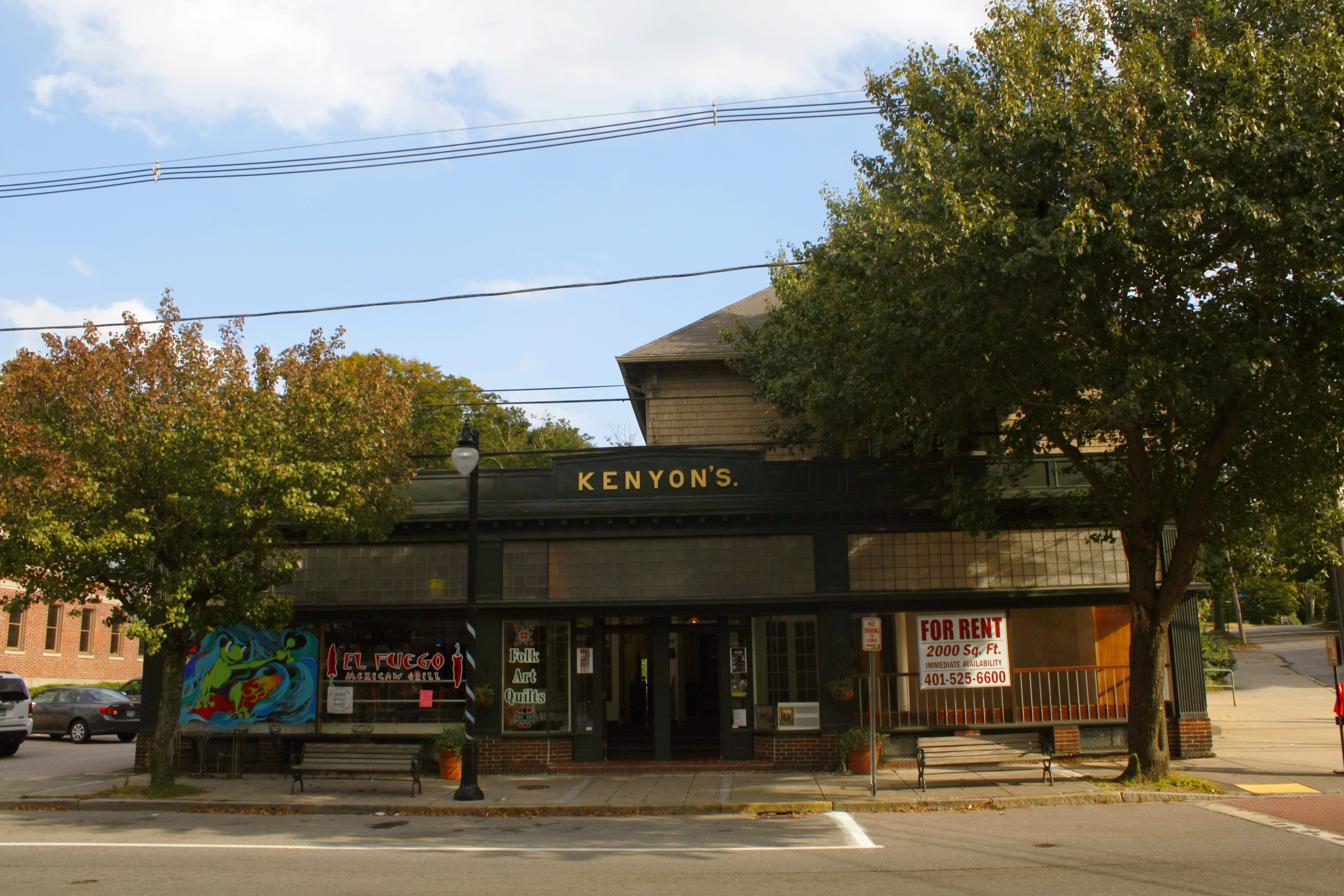
- Kenyon's Department Store in 2012

- Location within Rhode Island Location within the United States
- Location: 344 Main Street, South Kingstown, Rhode Island
- Coordinates: 41°26′17″N 71°29′59″W
- Built: 1891
- Architect: Charles Chase, Harry A. Lewis
- Architectural style: Chicago, Queen Anne
- NRHP reference No.: 92001540
- Added to NRHP: November 5, 1992

Kenyon's Department Store is an historic department store building in the village of Wakefield in the town of South Kingstown, Rhode Island.

The historic Chicago style/Queen Anne style store was built in 1891 by Charles Chase and Harry Lewis. Kenyon's Department Store was located in "Wakefield, a village that began when William Kenyon bought 100 acres (40 ha) and donated the dirt streets." The original department store business was founded in 1856. The 1891 store building was added to the National Register of Historic Places in 1992. Kenyon's Department Store closed in 1996 when the last descendant retired, and the owner donated the building to South County Hospital to maintain as a medical supply store.

== See also ==
- National Register of Historic Places listings in Washington County, Rhode Island
