= Saugatucket River =

River in Rhode Island, United States

Coordinates: 41.478757°N 71.485319°W

The Saugatucket River is a river in the U.S. state of Rhode Island. It flows approximately 13 km (8 mi). There are three dams along the river's length.

== Course ==
The river begins in a small pond east of Deer Ridge Drive in North Kingstown. From there, it flows south through South Kingstown to its mouth at Silver Spring Cove, south of the village of Wakefield.

== Crossings ==
Below is a list of all crossings over the Saugatucket River. The list starts at the headwaters and goes downstream.

- South Kingstown
  - Mooresfield Road (RI 138)
  - Broad Rock Road
  - Saugatucket Road
  - Kersey Road
  - Kingstown Road (RI 108)
  - Church Street
  - Main Street
  - Silver Lake Avenue
  - U.S. 1

== Tributaries ==
Fresh Meadow and Rocky Brooks are the only two named tributaries of the Saugatucket River, though it has many unnamed streams that also feed it.

== See also ==
- List of rivers in Rhode Island
- Narragansett Bay
