= Hannah Robinson Tower =

Wooden tower in Rhode Island, USA

Coordinates: 41.495156°N 71.455777°W

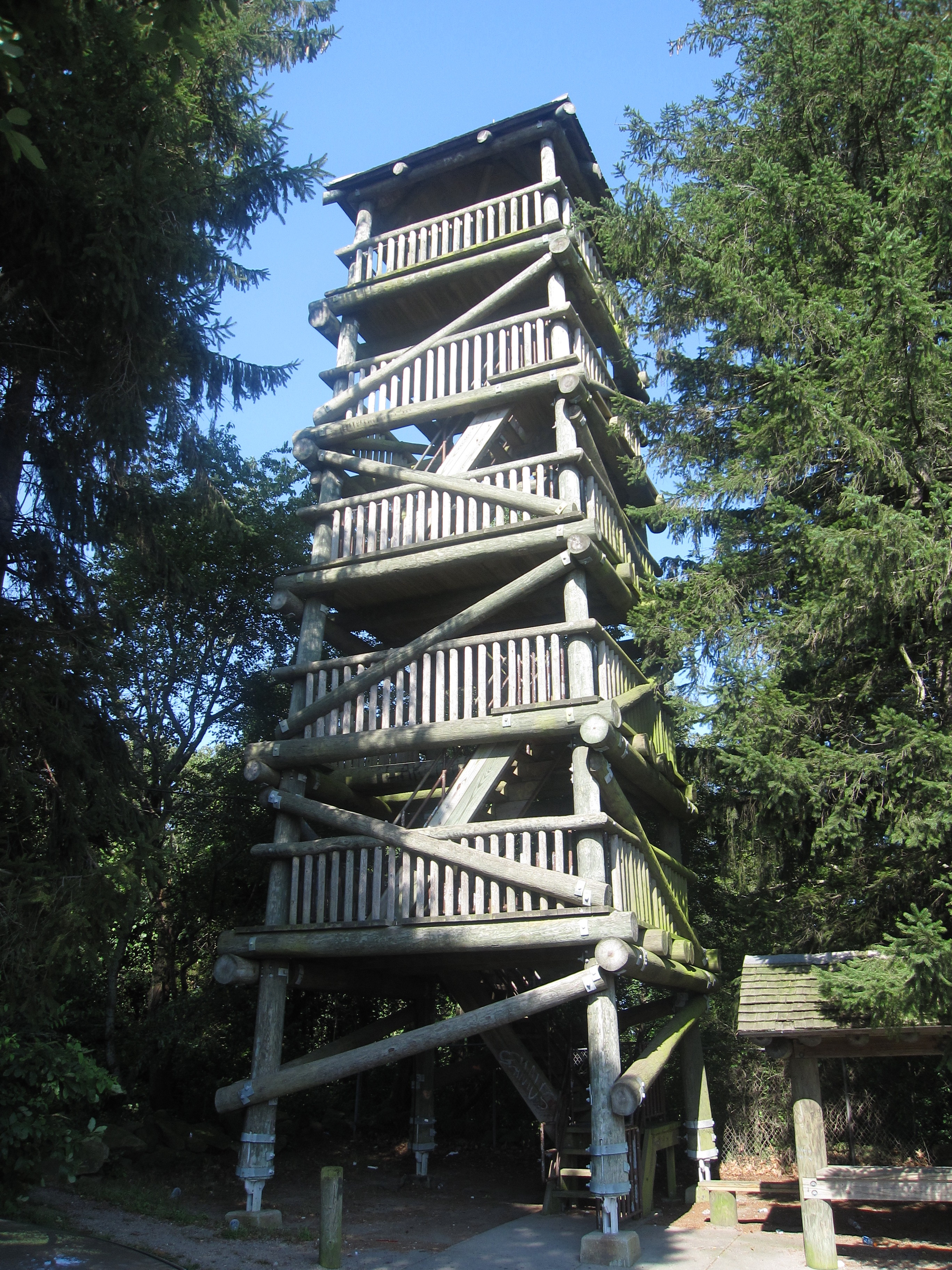
The tower as viewed from the southwestern side

The Hannah Robinson Tower is a 40 feet (12 m) tall wooden tower at the interchange between U.S. Route 1 (Tower Hill Road) and Route 138 (Bridgetown Road) in the community of South Kingstown, Washington County, Rhode Island. The tower was built in 1938 by the Civilian Conservation Corps and was rebuilt in 1988 using the same pillars. The structure is named after Hannah Robinson (1746–1773), a colonial Rhode Island resident and daughter of a wealthy Narragansett society man, Rowland Robinson. Hannah fell in love with a local teacher, Peter Simon, but the relationship was deemed unsuitable by her father. Despite her father's disapproval, Hannah Robinson married her suitor and lived in Providence, Rhode Island. The family became estranged from Robinson, who was enveloped in poverty, leading to a fatal decline. Robinson's father ended his opposition and left his community of Boston Neck to bring Hannah home. As Rowland Robinson brought his daughter home, she requested a chance to visit nearby McSparran Hill, where she considered a view of her homeland. Robinson died soon after.

In 1966, the owner of the land along McSparran Hill, sold off the 1.52-acre (0.62 ha) of land along with the rock to Preserve Rhode Island. Although owned by Preserve Rhode Island, the property is managed independently by Rhode Island Department of Environmental Management. The state maintains the area as public open space as a memorial to Hannah Robinson.

== History ==
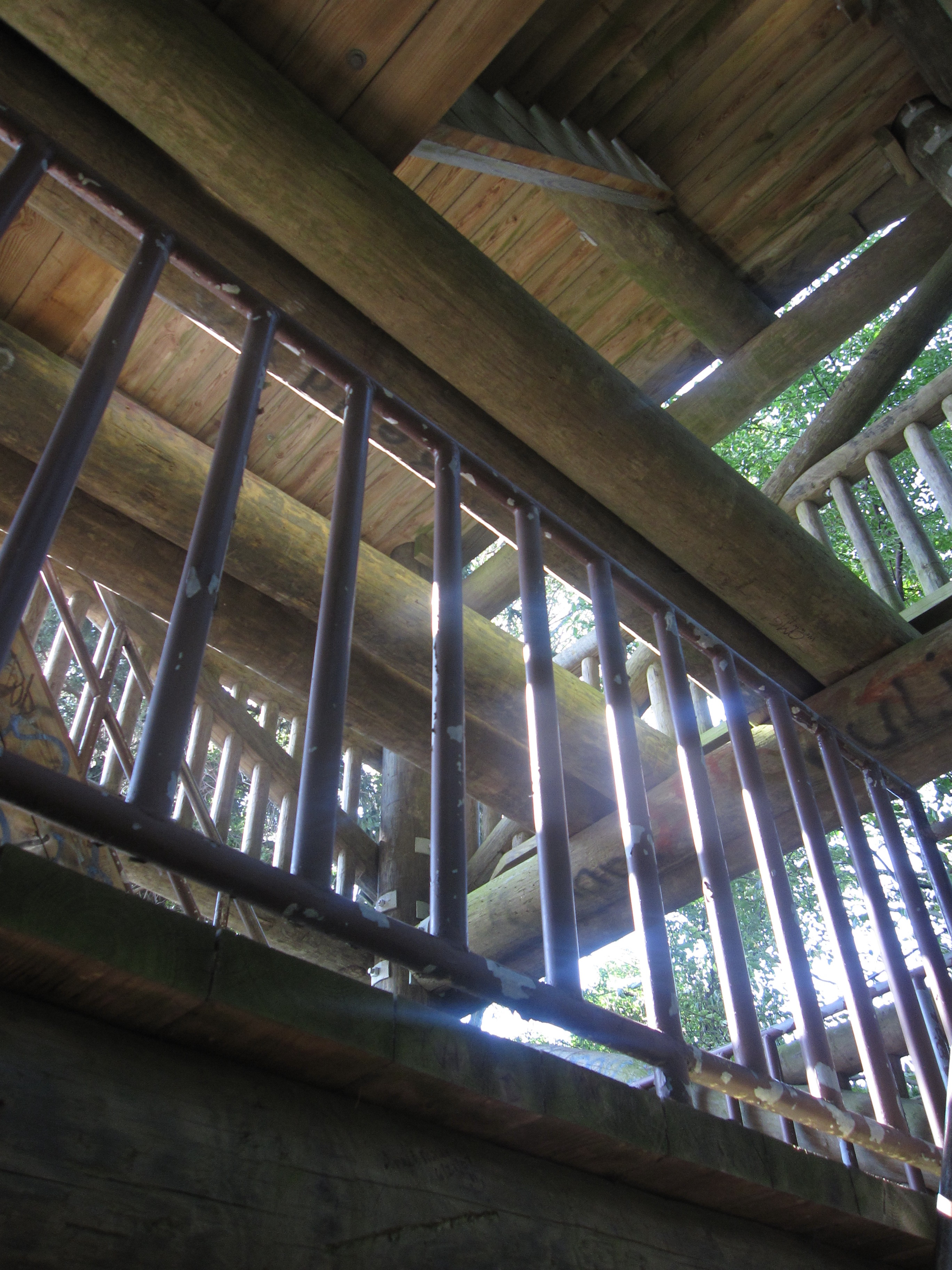
The indoor siding of the tower

=== Hannah Robinson (1746–1773) ===
Hannah Robinson was born in 1746 as the daughter of Rowland Robinson Jr., a prominent member of the community of Narragansett's planter society. Her father, Rowland Robinson Jr, was born in October 1719, as a descendant to Rowland Robinson, a British emigrant from Long Bluff, England. He married Anstis Gardiner, a local farmer's daughter in December 1741, giving birth to two daughters and one son. One of the two daughters, Hannah, fell in love with Peter Simon, a teacher of French and dancing classes at a young woman's school in Newport. Her father disapproved of the relationship between Simon and Robinson, deeming him "unsuitable", although the two kept their relationship in secret. Most of the family supported the relationship, giving Simon a teaching job in a member's home. One night, Rowland Robinson found Simon hiding in the lilac bushes under Hannah's window. Robinson then was banned from ever seeing him again, nor letting her leave the house in Boston Neck. Hannah Robinson had a stubborn streak from her father and during a trip to a ball in North Kingstown, the couple, with help of Robinson's mother, Anstis Gardiner, escaped the family. Rowland Robinson became furious at the news and gave a reward for anyone who had information of who was involved.

Simon and Robinson moved to Providence, Rhode Island, and soon gave birth to nine children, although they were stricken with poverty. When Simon came to the assumption that Robinson would not get one shilling of her family's wealth, he began to have affairs and soon abandoned her completely. Robinson was broken-hearted and becoming ill, and as a result, her mother sent her several items from Boston Neck, including her little dog, and the maid that Robinson had received during childhood, also named Hannah. Robinson held on a few more years in Providence and her father proposed that if Hannah would just tell who helped her escape, he'd let her back into the family. Hannah Robinson relented after a long struggle with her father, but was already close to death. Her father, Rowland Robinson, rode up from the community of Boston Neck to Providence, relenting his prior opposition, and brought Hannah Robinson home. When Rowland Robinson arrived, all of the demands went away with the sight of his daughter and he was filled with grief and remorse. Along the ride home to Boston Neck, Hannah Robinson requested her father to pull over at the site of James McSparran's farm, which overlooked the Narragansett Bay and Boston Neck. Here, she requested her father let her sit on the cube-shaped rocks and look over her homeland. Robinson died on October 30, 1773, by natural causes from her ill health, at only age 27.

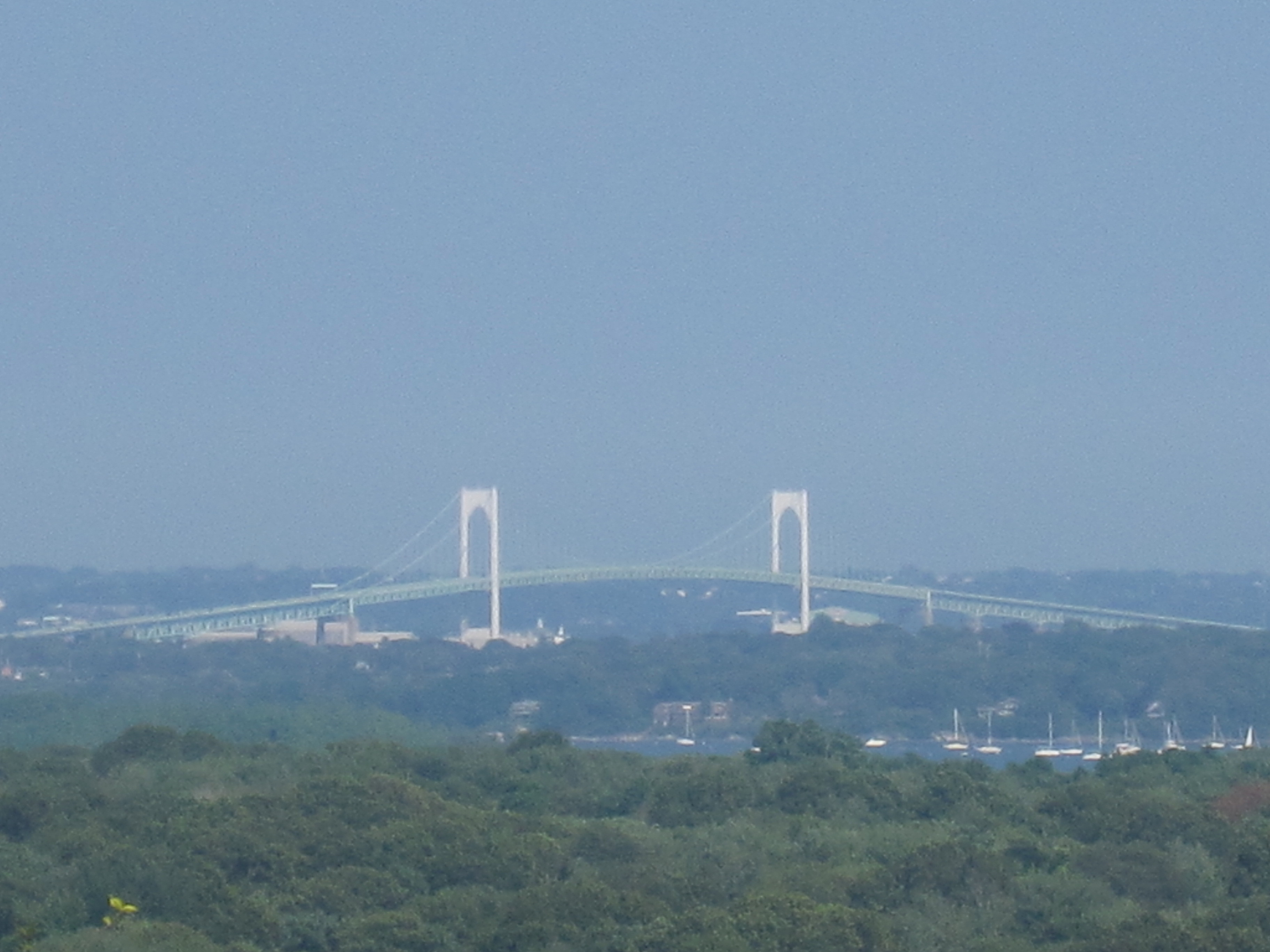
The Newport Bridge seen from the top of the tower

=== The tower and nearby rock ===
In 1938, the Civilian Conservation Corps (CCC) constructed a new watch tower at the site where Robinson watched over Boston Neck. The new tower, 100 feet (30 m) high was made of wood and raised with pillars. The tower was used during World War II as an observation tower. The height of the tower overlooked the Atlantic Ocean and Narragansett Bay on clear afternoons, and the former cube-shaped rock that Robinson sat on, remains on the former McSparran farm, which was sold by its owner in 1966 to the state. The land 1.52 acres of land became a preserved area, including both the rock and the tower in memorial to Hannah Robinson. In 1988, the state rebuilt the tower using the original structure's pillars and remains standing, at 40 feet (12 m) high and four stories tall.

== See also ==
- South Kingstown, Rhode Island
