= Rhode Island Route 108 =

State highway in Rhode Island, US

Route 108
- Route 108 highlighted in red

Route information
- Maintained by RIDOT
- Length: 8.6 mi (13.8 km)
- Existed: 1934–present

Major junctions
- South end: Ocean Road in Point Judith
- US 1 in Narragansett Pier; Route 1A in Wakefield-Peacedale
- North end: Route 138 in Kingston

Location
- Country: United States
- State: Rhode Island

Highway system
- Rhode Island Routes
← Route 107	→ Route 110

Route 108 is a 8.6-mile-long (13.8 km) state highway in Washington County, Rhode Island. The route begins at an intersection with Ocean Road in the village of Narragansett Pier (within the town of Narragansett), just north of Point Judith Light. The route's northern terminus is at an intersection with Route 138 in the town of South Kingstown, just east of the University of Rhode Island. In between, Route 108 connects to the Block Island Sound community of Galilee and passes through the villages of Wakefield and Peace Dale.

== Route description ==
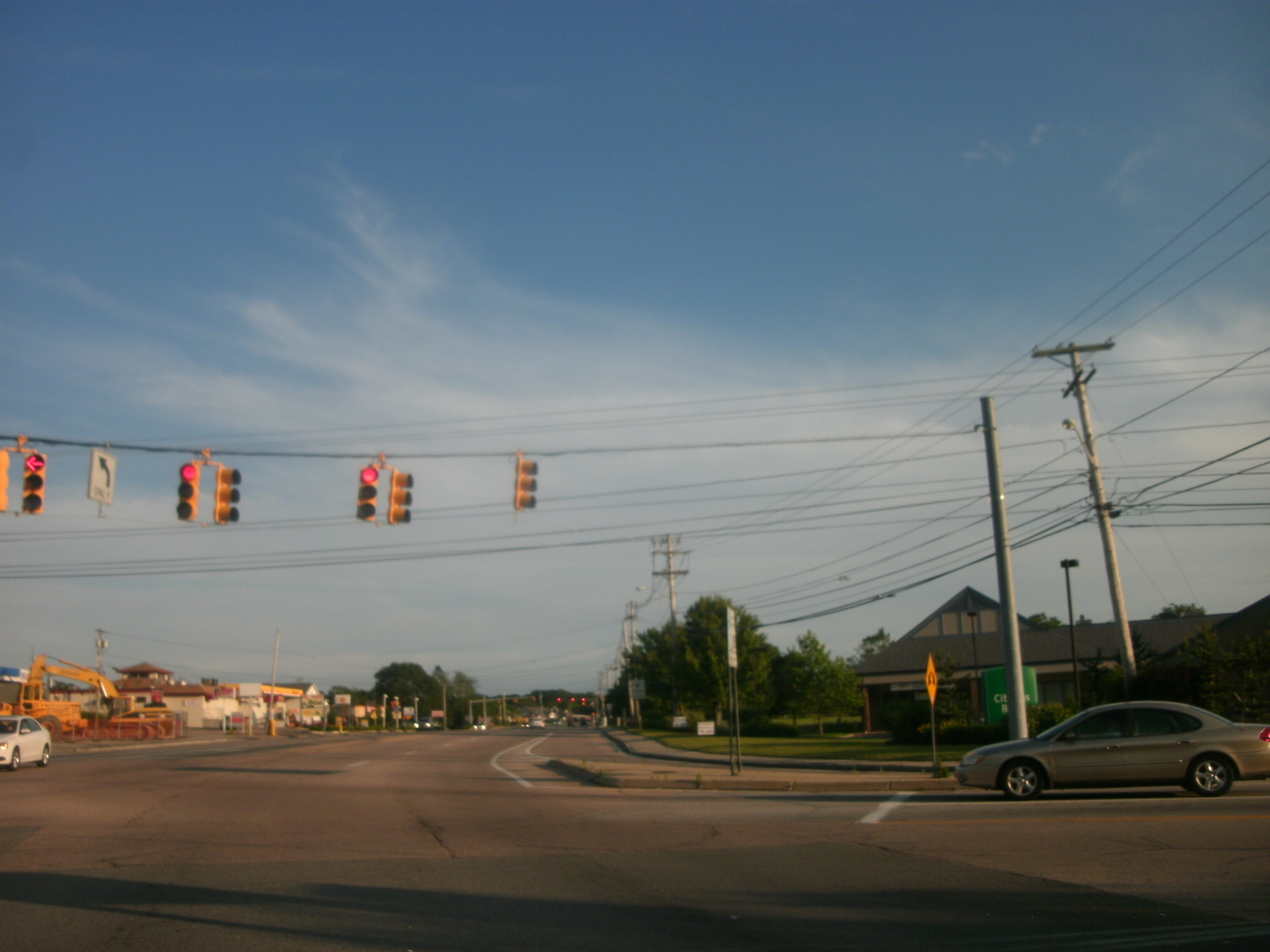
Route 108 southbound as seen from the junction with Route 1A in Narragansett

Route 108 begins at an intersection with Ocean Road in the village of Narragansett Pier, several blocks north of Point Judith Light. Route 108 proceeds eastward as Point Judith Road, before turning northward at White Swan Road. The route is residential in nature for several blocks, soon intersecting with the Galilee Escape Route, which connects Route 108 to the village of Galilee and the Point Judith Block Island Ferry, which connects to Block Island. Route 108 continues north through Naragansett Pier, passing west of the park that once served as Fort Nathanael Greene. After the junction with Knowlesway Extension, Route 108 becomes residential once again, winding northward through the northern end of the village. After Burnside Avenue, the route winds northward, passing west of the Port Judith Country Club as a two-lane residential and wooded road.

At Sunnybrook Farm Road, Route 108 bends north into a short commercial stretch of Narragansett Pier and bending northwest into a junction with Route 1A (South Pier Road) and a connector to US 1 southbound (Woodruff Avenue). A short distance after, an on-ramp to US 1 northbound forks to the right, as Route 108 and Route 1A continue north into the Dillon Rotary, where Route 1A heads off towards the Atlantic Ocean and Route 108 continues north as Kingstown Road and under US 1. After US 1, Route 108 proceeds northwest as a four-lane commercial street, now in the town of South Kingstown. At the junction with MacArthur Boulevard (now in the village of Wakefield), RI 108 condenses down to two-lanes as it winds northwest past several strip malls.

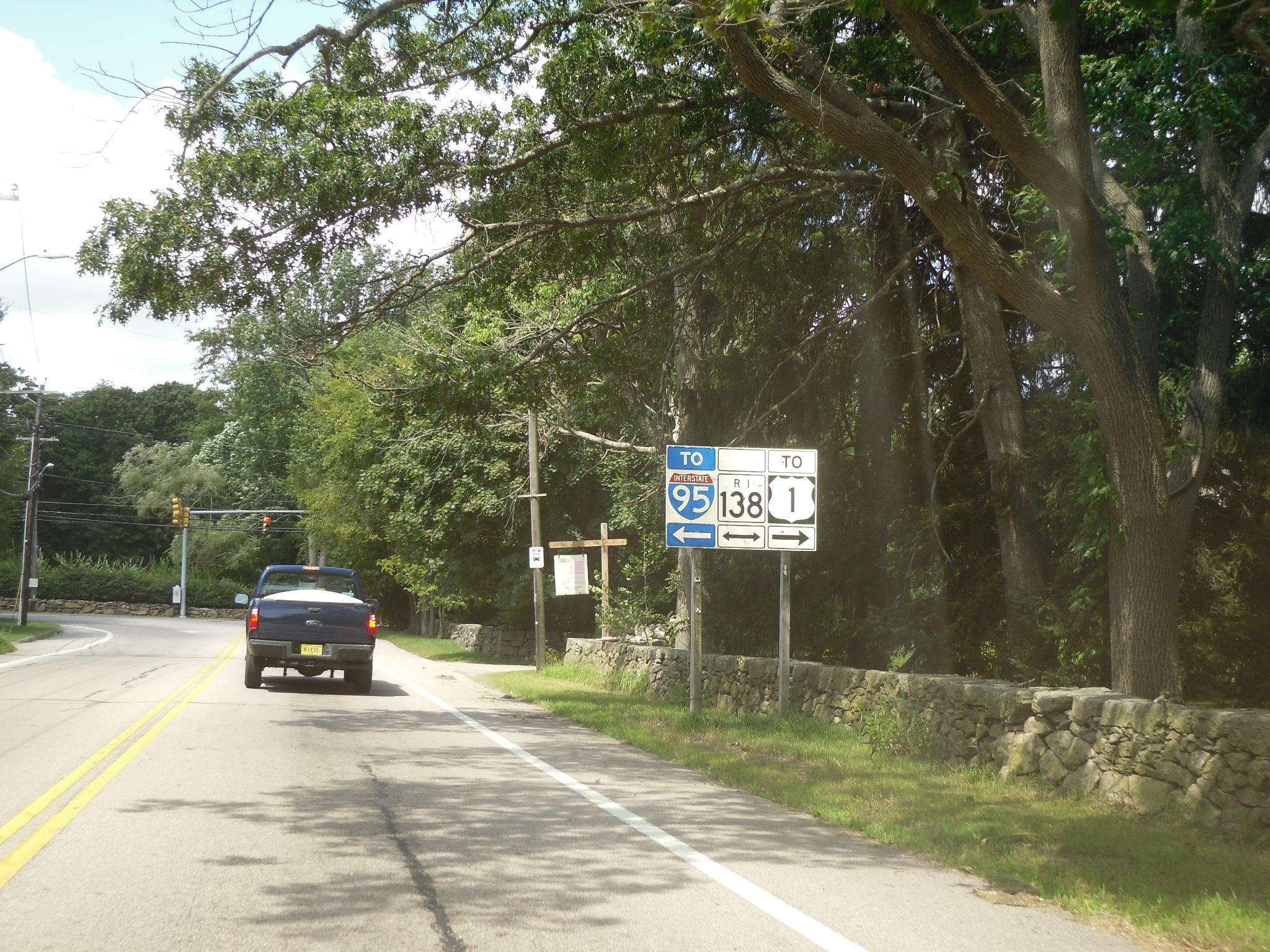
Route 108 northbound at the junction with Route 138 in Kingston

A short distance later, Route 108 intersects with the four-lane Old Tower Hill Road and Main Street before continuing north as a four-lane boulevard. The route soon condenses to two-lanes and bends northward past a large baseball field, park and several residences. At Broad Rock Road, Route 108 turns northwest again, passing the South Kingstown Public Library in the community of Peace Dale. In Peace Dale, Route 108 darts north, northwest and southwest around several buildings, soon passing along the Saugatucket River. The route winds westward into a junction with High Street before turning northwest again at Sweet Fern Lane. Route 108 and Kingstown Road continue west soon after, leaving Peace Dale near the Rocky Brook Reservoir and its pump house.

After the reservoir, Route 108 bends northward, becoming a two-lane residential street as it winds northward through the town of South Kingstown. The route crosses Curtis Corner Road and becomes a commercial street once again, which quickly switches back to residences. The route soon bends northward, entering the village of Kingston. In Kingston, Route 108 retains its Kingstown Road name, becoming a two-lane residential street before intersecting with Route 138 (Mooresfield Road) in the center of the village. This intersection serves as the northern terminus of Route 108, while the Kingstown Road name continues west on Route 138.

== History ==
Before 1934, Route 108 followed present-day Route 246 and Route 146A from Providence to Woonsocket, then along Park Avenue to end at Route 122. The current Route 108 south of Wakefield was unnumbered at the time. North of Wakefield, current Route 108 was part of 1920s Route 107.

Until the summer of 2004, Route 108 turned off Kingstown Road (the State-maintained route) in Peace Dale, following Kersey Road and North Road and bypassing the Peace Dale Rotary. However, most maps showed Route 108 staying on Kingstown Road. However, new signage was installed in 2004 that puts Route 108 on Kingstown Road through Peace Dale. The routing on Kersey and North Roads may have been done to avoid low clearances where the Narragansett Pier Railroad used to cross over Kingstown Road twice. Those overpasses have been torn down, and a bike path now crosses Route 108 twice within a quarter mile.

== Major intersections ==
The entire route is in Washington County.

Location	mi	km	Destinations	Notes
Point Judith	0.0	0.0	Ocean Road	Southern terminus
Narragansett Pier	4.2	6.8	US 1 north – Providence	Northbound exit only, flyover ramp to US 1
Narragansett Pier	4.6	7.4	US 1 / Route 1A north – Providence, Westerly, Narragansett	Dillon Rotary, Southern terminus of concurrency with Route 1A, no northbound exit
Wakefield-Peacedale	5.1	8.2	Route 1A south (Main Street) – Wakefield Center	Northern terminus of concurrency with Route 1A
Kingston	8.6	13.8	Route 138 (Mooresfield Road) to I-95 / US 1 – Hopkinton, Newport	Northern terminus
1.000 mi = 1.609 km; 1.000 km = 0.621 mi: Concurrency terminus; Incomplete access
