= U.S. Route 1 in Rhode Island =

Section of U.S. Route in Rhode Island, United States

U.S. Route 1
- US 1 highlighted in red

Route information
- Maintained by RIDOT
- Length: 57 mi (92 km)
- Existed: 1926–present

Major junctions
- South end: US 1 in Stonington, CT
- Route 138 in South Kingstown; Route 4 in North Kingstown; Route 403 in East Greenwich; Route 37 in Warwick; Route 10 in Cranston; I-95 in Providence; US 6 / US 44 in Providence
- North end: US 1 in Attleboro, MA

Location
- Country: United States
- State: Rhode Island
- Counties: Washington, Kent, Providence

Highway system
- United States Numbered Highway System; List; Special; Divided; Rhode Island Routes
← Route 403	→ US 1A

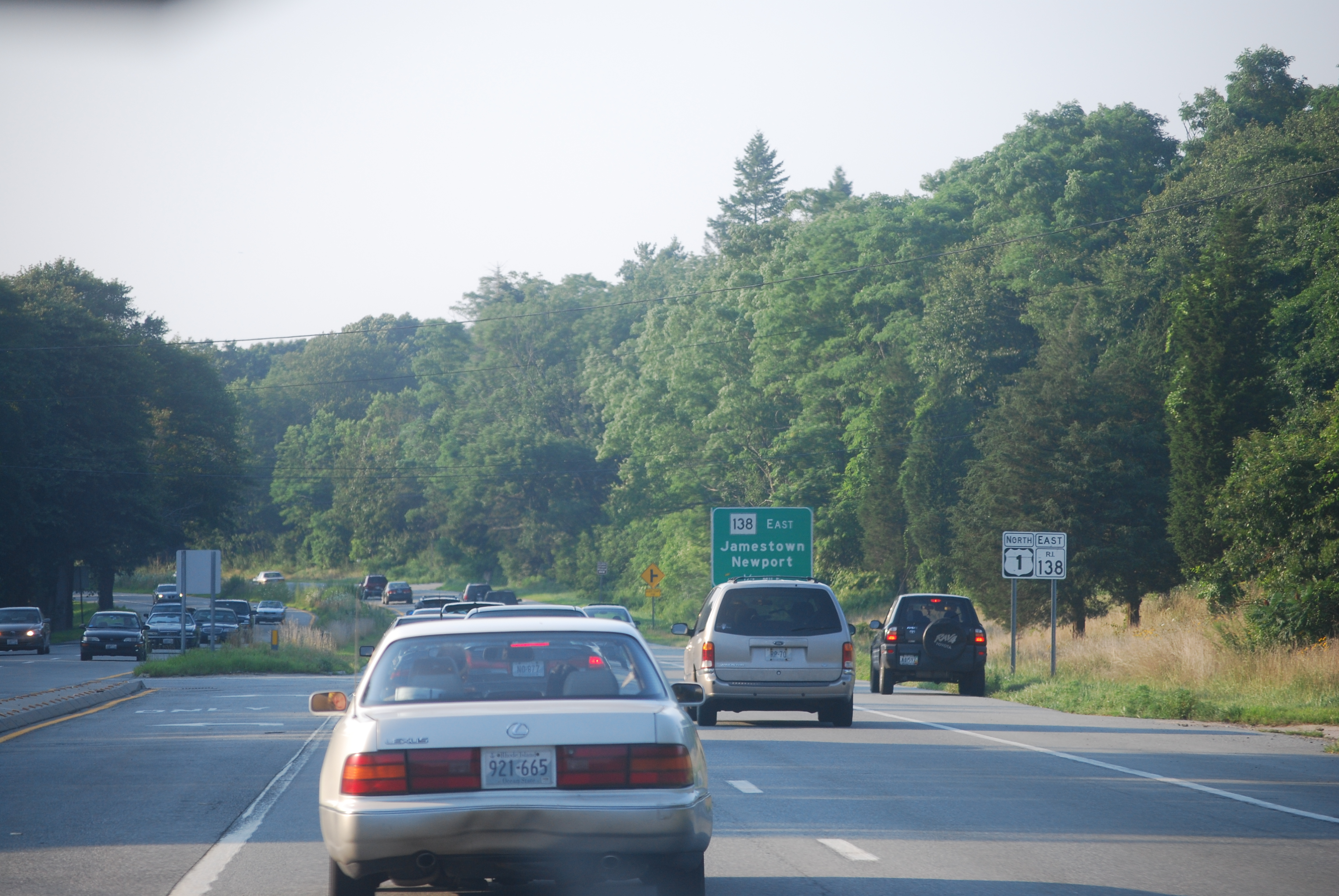
US 1/Route 138 concurrency

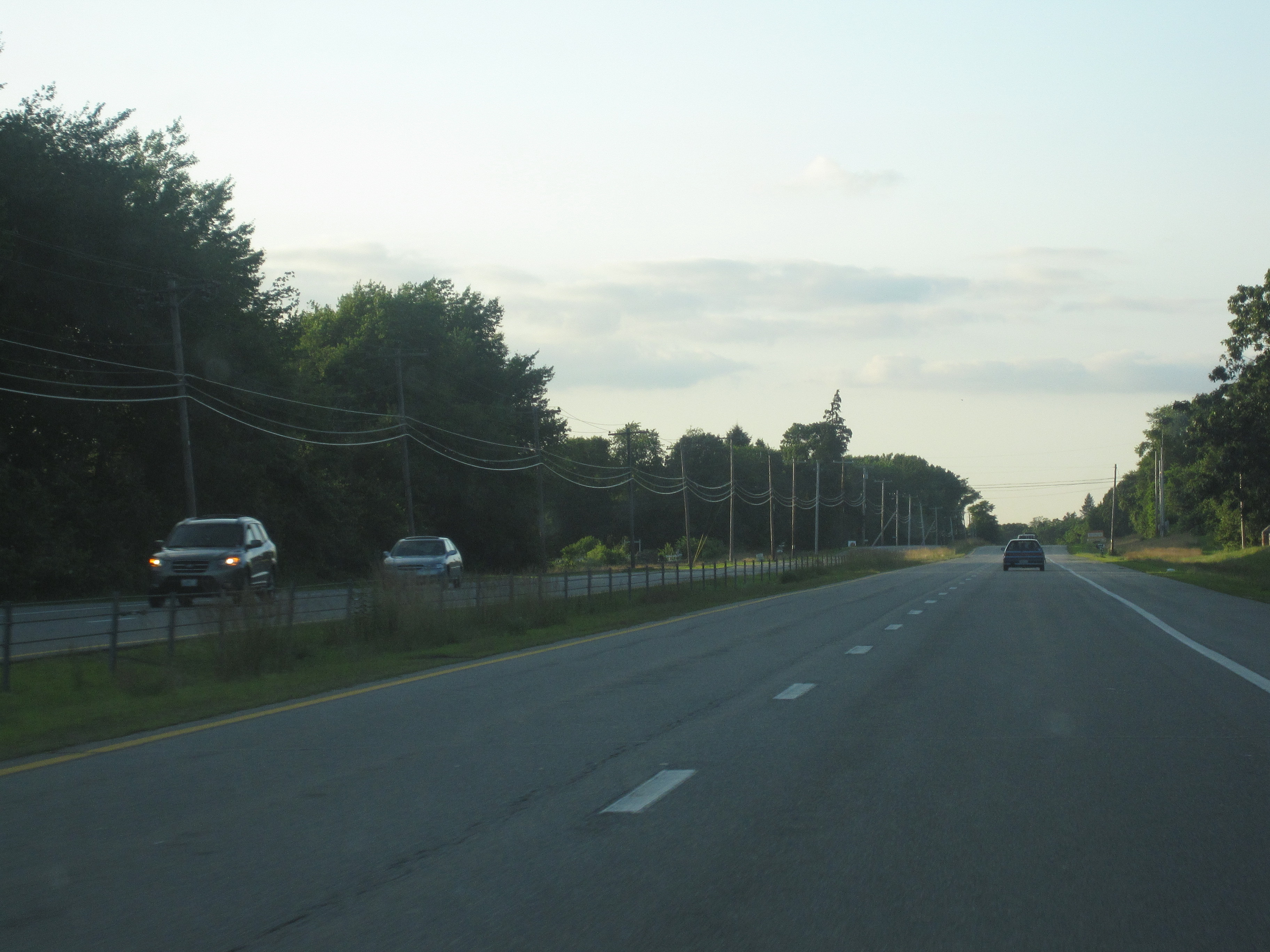
US 1 as a divided highway in North Kingstown

U.S. Route 1 (US 1) is a major north–south U.S. Route through the U.S. state of Rhode Island, specifically within the Providence metropolitan area. Staying close to the Atlantic Ocean and Narragansett Bay, it is a longer route than Interstate 95 (I-95), and many portions are a four-lane divided highway.

== Route description ==
US 1 enters Rhode Island via a small bridge from Pawcatuck, Connecticut, to downtown Westerly. US 1 winds through downtown Westerly, passing two shopping plazas (the Granite Street Shopping Center and the Franklin Shopping Plaza) prior to a junction with Route 78, the two-lane highway designed to bypass downtown. A right onto Airport Road at this intersection provides access to Westerly State Airport, Watch Hill, and Misquamicut. US 1 continues to Dunn's Corners, with Langworthy Road providing more beach access.

The road then becomes a divided highway shortly after, with Route 1A merging into the highway from the Misquamicut area. US 1 then crosses into Charlestown near Shelter Harbor. After stoplight intersections with Ross Hill Road (Route 216), West Beach Road (providing access to Quonochontaug), East Beach Road (providing access to Blue Shutters Town Beach and East Beach), and Wildflower Road, there are no more stoplights until the end of the freeway after the Wakefield-Peacedale exits. Access to exits on the opposite side of the road are provided through U-turn ramps. The southbound side has junction with Prosser Trail, a road leading to Burlingame State Park. Burlingame access is also located prior to the East Beach Road exit. An exit for Route 1A on the northbound side leads to Ningret Park and the police station. US 1 bends to the right. On the southbound side is Kings Factory Road. Another junction with Route 1A occurs on US 1 north. Route 1A merges onto US 1 from the south, briefly, before exiting and continuing north to Cross Mills. US 1 north then features a ramp, providing access to Cross Mills and Route 1A—leading to Charlestown Breachway State and Charlestown Town beaches—for those just merging in on a U-turn from US 1 south via a junction with Route 2/Route 112 (South County Trail).

Another set of U-turn ramps is located for access to Route 2 and Route 112. After northbound junctions with more beach access roads (Falcone Lane, Narrow Lane, which is split in half by the highway, the other half continuing on the southbound side that leads to South County Trail), US 1 continues into South Kingstown, where Green Hill Beach Road (Route 1A) meets US 1 on the northbound side and Post Road (also Route 1A) meets US 1 south. After a junction with Moonstone Beach Road (northbound side leads to the Trustom Pond National Wildlife Refuge, southbound side leads to Perryville), Route 110 meets US 1 south. Prior to this on the southbound side, Route 1A meets US 1. Back to the northbound side, where Matunuck Beach Road is found, leading to the beachside community of Matunuck.

Following this is Succotash Road, which leads to Jerusalem, Snug Harbor, and East Matunuck State Beach. Then comes Post Road, leading to the signed destination, Jerry Brown Farm Road. Another Post Road/Route 1A junction comes on US 1 north, before it meets the highway again after a brief exitless stint. US 1 south's junction with Post Road/Route 1A north leads to Wakefield and Peace Dale. The road becomes a freeway and has two exits for the Salt Pond/South County Hospital area.

A third exit leads to Route 108 and Narragansett's town beach, Galilee, and Point Judith. A Wakefield exit marks the end of the freeway. Access to South County Commons comes soon. Route 138 meets from the west and stays on in the concurrency until the exits for access to the Jamestown Verrazzano Bridge and Jamestown and the Claiborne Pell Newport Bridge and Newport. US 1 then meets Route 4, a thruway leading to I-95.

== History ==
Except north of Downtown, where US 1 was built as the Providence and Pawtucket Turnpike (now Main Street), the highway was never a turnpike road. Portions are the old Boston Post Road, while other parts were built as bypasses, leaving the old road as US 1A. The turnpike south of Providence—the Providence and Pawcatuck and Hopkinton and Richmond turnpikes—followed the diagonal route that I-95 now takes.

== Major intersections ==
County	Location	mi	km	Destinations	Notes
Pawcatuck River		0.0	0.0	US 1 south	Bridge; continuation into Connecticut
Washington	Westerly	0.1	0.16	Route 1A north	Southern terminus of Route 1A
Washington	Westerly	0.3	0.48	Route 3 north (Grove Avenue) to I-95	Southern terminus of Route 3
Washington	Westerly	2.2	3.5	Route 78 north to I-95	Southern terminus of Route 78
Washington	Westerly	5.7	9.2	Route 1A south – Misquamicut State Beach, Watch Hill	
Washington	Charlestown	7.1	11.4	Route 216 north (Ross Hill Road)	Southern terminus of Route 216
Washington	Charlestown	9.8	15.8	Route 1A north / Prosser Trail – Ninigret National Wildlife Refuge, Burlingame State Park	Right-in/right-out with u-turns; former routing of US 1
Washington	Charlestown	11.2	18.0	Route 1A south (Old Post Road)	Northbound right-in/right-out with u-turns; former routing of US 1
Washington	Charlestown	11.4	18.3	Route 1A north (Old Post Road)	Northbound right-in/right-out with u-turns; former routing of US 1
Washington	Charlestown	11.9	19.2	Route 2 north / Route 112 north / Cross Mills Road – Kenyon, Carolina, Charlestown Beach	Right-in/right-out with u-turns; southern termini of Routes 2 and 112
Washington	South Kingstown	14.3– 14.8	23.0– 23.8	Route 1A (Post Road) / Green Hill Beach Road – Perryville	Right-in/right-out with u-turns; former routing of US 1
Washington	South Kingstown	16.4	26.4	Route 110 north – Kingston, University of Rhode Island	Southbound right-in/right-out with u-turns; southern terminus of Route 110
Washington	South Kingstown	16.6	26.7	Post Road (Route 1A south) – Perryville	Southbound right-in/right-out with u-turns; former routing of US 1
Washington	South Kingstown			Post Road (Route 1A north) to Camp Fuller Road	Northbound right-in/right-out with u-turns; former routing of US 1
Washington	South Kingstown	18.5	29.8	Post Road (Route 1A) – Wakefield	Right-in/right-out with u-turns; former routing of US 1
Washington	South Kingstown	18.5	29.8	Southern terminus of freeway section	
Washington	South Kingstown	20.6	33.2	Pond Street	
Washington	South Kingstown	21.0	33.8	Salt Pond Road – South County Hospital	
Washington	Narragansett	21.4	34.4	Route 108 south – Narragansett, Point Judith, Scarborough	No southbound entrance
Washington	Narragansett	21.9	35.2	Route 1A – Narragansett	No northbound exit; former routing of US 1
Washington	South Kingstown	22.4	36.0	Old Tower Hill Road – Wakefield	
Washington	South Kingstown	22.4	36.0	Northern terminus of freeway section	
Washington	South Kingstown	26.3	42.3	Route 138 west to I-95 south – University of R.I.	Southern terminus of Route 138 concurrency
Washington	North Kingstown	28.6	46.0	Route 138 east – Jamestown, Newport	Interchange; northern terminus of Route 138 concurrency
Washington	North Kingstown	29.5	47.5	Route 4 north to Route 403 – Quonset, T.F. Green Airport	Southern terminus of Route 4; no northbound access from Route 4
Washington	North Kingstown	31.5	50.7	Route 102 (Ten Rod Road / Phillips Street)	
Washington	North Kingstown	32.0	51.5	Route 1A south (West Main Street) – Wickford	Northern terminus of Route 1A
Washington	North Kingstown	34.4	55.4	Route 403	Interchange; exit 3A on Route 403
Washington	North Kingstown	36.3	58.4	Route 402 west (Frenchtown Road) to Route 4 / I-95	Eastern terminus of Route 402
Hunt River				Bridge	
Kent	East Greenwich	38.1	61.3	Route 401 (First Avenue) to Route 4	Eastern terminus of Route 401
Kent	Warwick	41.4	66.6	Route 117 (Centerville Road / West Shore Road) to I-95	
Kent	Warwick	41.5	66.8	Route 5 north (Greenwich Avenue)	Southern terminus of Route 5
Kent	Warwick	42.8	68.9	Route 113 (Main Avenue) to I-95	Southbound exit and northbound entrance
Kent	Warwick	43.6	70.2	T. F. Green Airport Connector Road to I-95 – T.F. Green Airport	Interchange
Kent	Warwick	44.8	72.1	Route 37 west to I-95 / I-295 – Providence, New York	Interchange, eastern terminus of Route 37, exit 3 on Route 37, Interchange to be reconstructed as part of the Rte 37 Improvements project
Kent	Warwick	45.7	73.5	US 1A north (Post Road)	Southern terminus of US 1A
Providence	Cranston	47.6	76.6	Route 12 (Park Avenue)	
Providence	Providence	48.0	77.2	Route 10 north to I-95	Interchange, no access to Route 10 south
Providence	Providence	48.5	78.1	I-95 south	Entrance from I-95 south only
Providence	Providence	49.2	79.2	Route 2 south (Reservoir Avenue)	Northern terminus of Route 2
Providence	Providence	50.4	81.1	Route 117 south (Broad Street)	Northern terminus of Route 117
Providence	Providence	51.1	82.2	I-95 / US 6 / Route 10 south to I-195 east / Route 146 north	Exit 36B on I-95 / US 6
Providence	Providence	51.6	83.0	US 44 west (Smith Street)	Southern terminus of concurrency with US 44
Providence	Providence			Francis Street Bridge over the Woonasquatucket River	
Providence	Providence	52.0	83.7	US 44 east (Canal Street / North Main Street)	Northern terminus of concurrency with US 44
Providence	Providence	52.2	84.0	Route 246 north (Mill Street) to Route 7 / Route 146	Southern terminus of Route 246
Providence	Providence	53.7	86.4	Route 126 north (Smithfield Avenue) to I-95	Southern terminus of Route 126
Providence	Pawtucket	54.1	87.1	Route 122 north (Main Street) to I-95 south	Southern terminus of Route 122
Providence	Pawtucket	55.3	89.0	I-95 south	Southern terminus of concurrency with I-95
Providence	Pawtucket	55.5	89.3	Route 114 (School Street)	Exit 41B
Providence	Pawtucket			Pawtucket River Bridge over the Pawtucket River	
Providence	Pawtucket	56.1	90.3	I-95 north	Northern terminus of concurrency with I-95
Providence	Pawtucket	57.2	92.1	US 1 north – Attleboro	Continuation into Massachusetts
1.000 mi = 1.609 km; 1.000 km = 0.621 mi: Concurrency terminus; Incomplete access

U.S. Route 1
Previous state: Connecticut	Rhode Island	Next state: Massachusetts
