= Usquepaug Road Historic District =

Historic district in Rhode Island, United States

- U.S. National Register of Historic Places
- U.S. Historic district
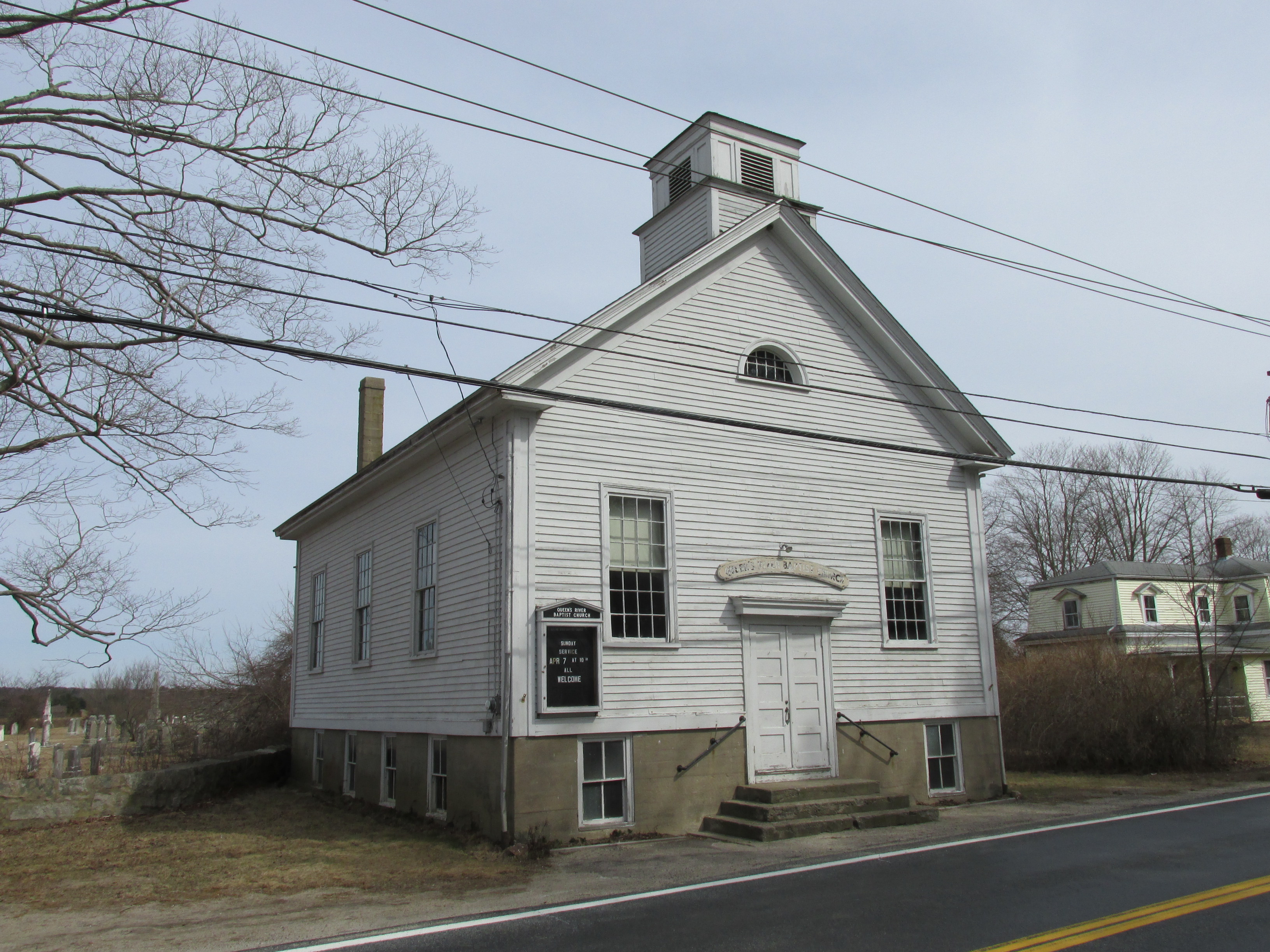
- Queen's River Baptist Church

- Location within Rhode Island Location within the United States
- Location: Usquepaug Rd., South Kingstown, Rhode Island
- Coordinates: 41°30′14″N 71°36′1″W
- Architect: Alpin, Stephen A.; Et al.
- Architectural style: Greek Revival
- NRHP reference No.: 87001298
- Added to NRHP: October 30, 1987

The Usquepaug Road Historic District (US-ka-pog) is a historic district near the village of Usquepaug in South Kingstown, Rhode Island. It consists of a collection of properties, mostly on the south side of Usequepaug Road (Rhode Island Route 138) between the Usquepaug Cemetery and Dugway Bridge Road. Although the area began as a rural, agricultural area, it developed into a modest rural village, with a church, school, and cluster of vernacular rural houses. The schoolhouse was destroyed in the New England Hurricane of 1938.

The district was listed on the National Register of Historic Places in 1987.

== See also ==
- National Register of Historic Places listings in Washington County, Rhode Island
