= Mattatuxet River =

River in Rhode Island, United States

Coordinates: 41.532700°N 71.462248°W

The Mattatuxet River is a river in the U.S. state of Rhode Island. It flows approximately 3 km (2 mi). There are two dams along the river's length.

== Course ==
The river rises in North Kingstown from an unnamed pond along Post Road, just east of the RI 138/U.S. 1 interchange. From there, the river flows north to Silver Spring Lake, then south to its mouth at Carr Pond. Below the pond, the river is tidal and becomes the Pettaquamscutt River (Narrow River).

== Crossings ==
Below is a list of all crossings over the Mattatuxet River. The list starts at the headwaters and goes downstream.

- North Kingstown
  - Tower Hill Road (U.S. 1)
  - Rhode Island State Route 138

== Tributaries ==
The Mattatuxet River has no named tributaries, though it has many unnamed streams that also feed it.

== See also ==
- List of rivers in Rhode Island
