= Usquepaug, Rhode Island =

Village in Rhode Island, United States

Coordinates: 41°30′11″N 71°36′32″W

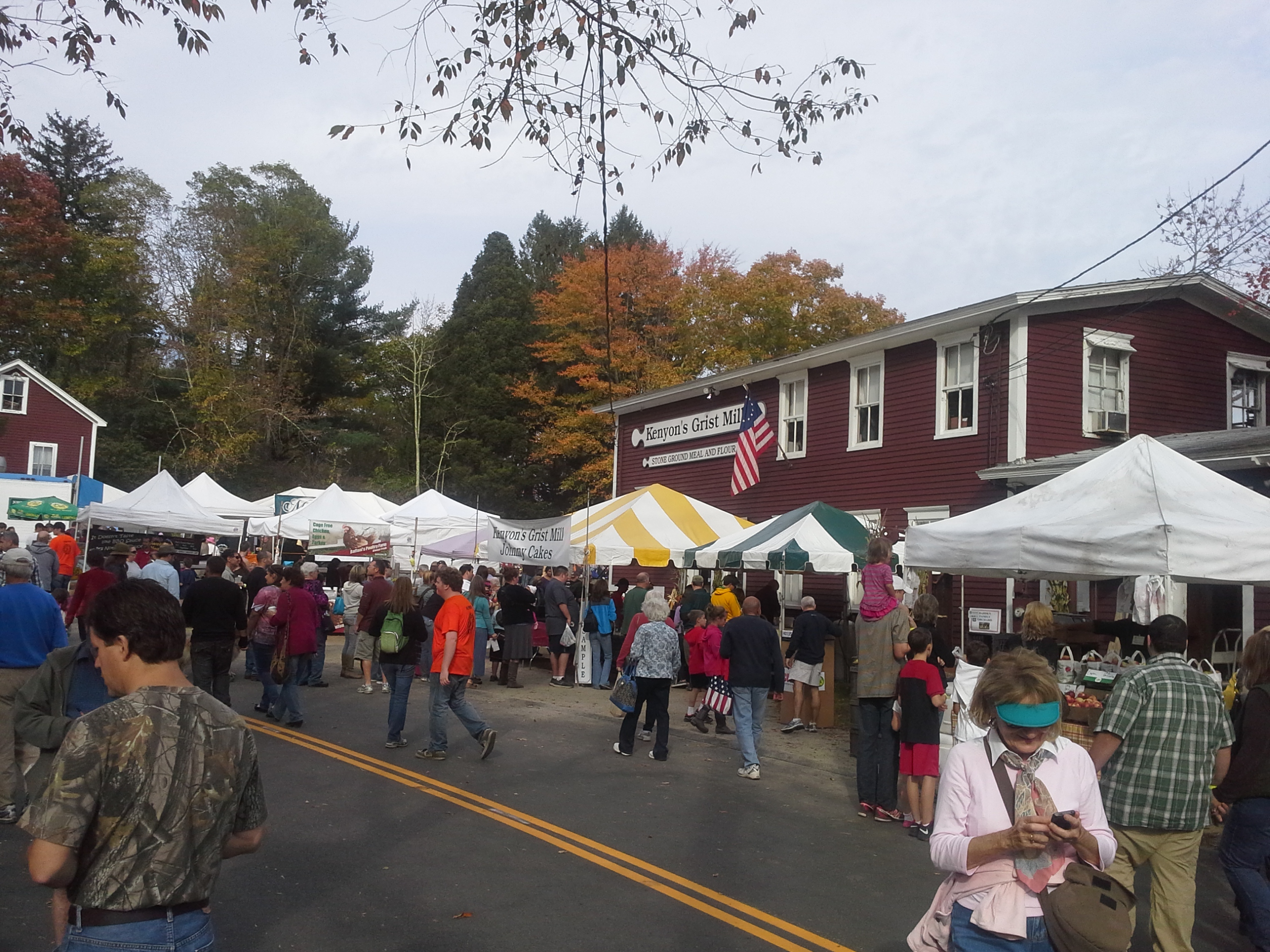
Johnny Cake Festival at Kenyon's Grist Mill

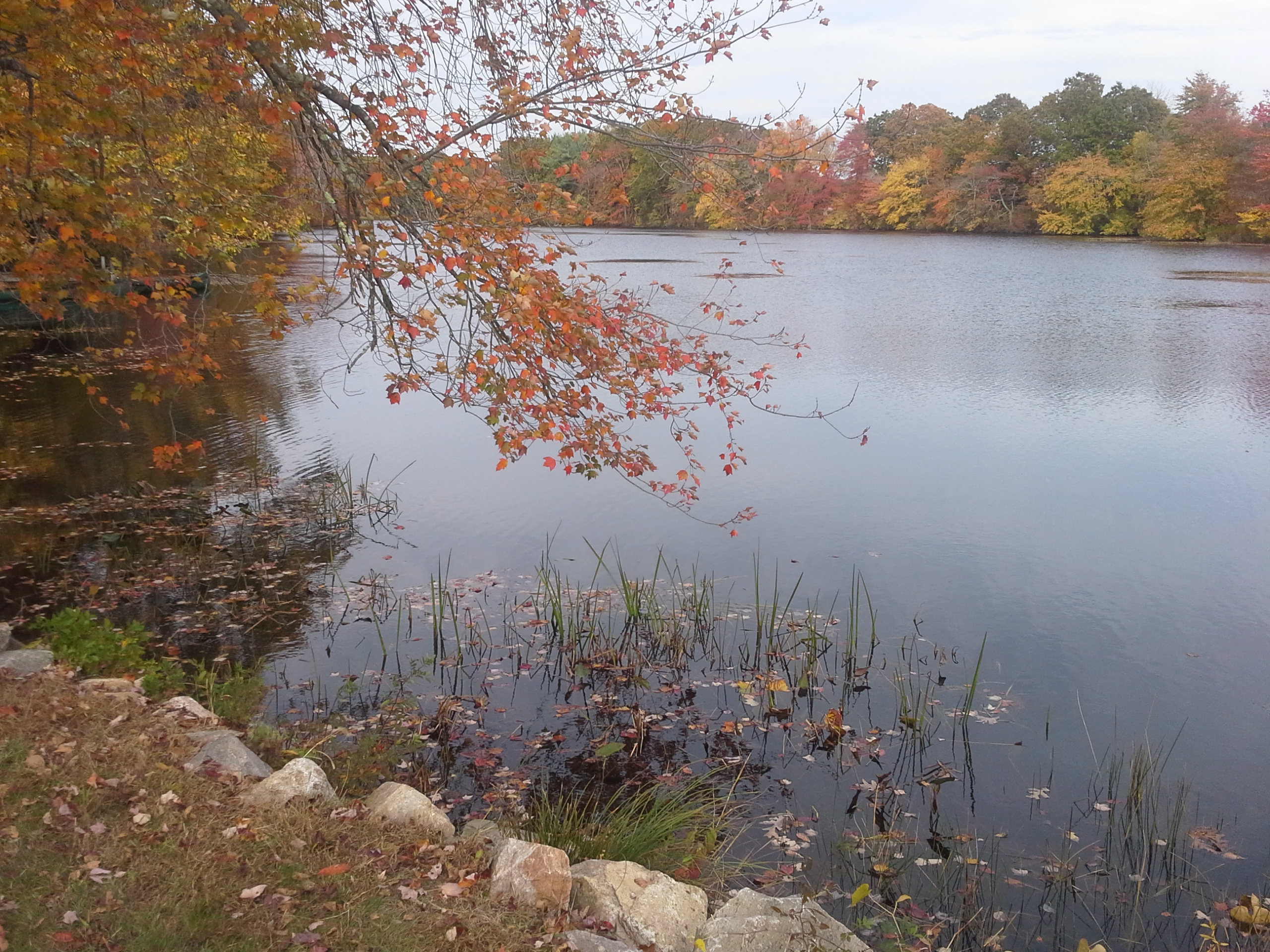
Mill pond in Usquepaug

Usquepaug (US-ka-pog) is a village in the towns of Richmond and South Kingstown, Rhode Island, United States. It is located along the Usquepaug River. A portion of the village is listed on the National Register of Historic Places as the Usquepaug Road Historic District.

== Overview ==
The village is the location of Kenyon Corn Meal Company, a gristmill founded in the late 17th century and located in a building constructed in 1886. The white corn meal is used in the traditional Rhode Island food johnnycakes, and the annual Johnny Cake Festival is held in Usquepaug.
