= Rhode Island Route 110 =

State highway in Washington County, Rhode Island, US

Route 110
- Ministerial Road

Route information
- Maintained by RIDOT
- Length: 6.1 mi (9.8 km)
- Existed: By 1969–present

Major junctions
- South end: US 1 in South Kingstown
- North end: Route 138 in West Kingston

Location
- Country: United States
- State: Rhode Island
- Counties: Washington

Highway system
- Rhode Island Routes
← Route 108	→ Route 112

Route 110 is a numbered state highway running 6.1 miles (9.8 km) wholly within the town of South Kingstown in Rhode Island. It serves to connect the University of Rhode Island to points south via U.S. Route 1 (US 1).

== Route description ==
Route 110 begins at US 1 near the village of Perryville in South Kingstown. The route heads north for 7 miles (11 km) following Ministerial Road through the wetlands of the Great Swamp. Along the way it intersects with the William C. O'Neill Bike Path. Soon after crossing some railroad tracks, Route 110 ends at an intersection with Route 138 in the village of West Kingston.

== History ==
Route 110 was assigned to Ministerial Road by 1969.

== Major intersections ==
The entire route is in Washington County.

Location	mi	km	Destinations	Notes
South Kingstown	0.0	0.0	US 1 south (Commodore Perry Highway)	Southern terminus, northbound access via nearby U-turn ramps
South Kingstown	0.2	0.32	Route 1A (Post Road)	
West Kingston	6.1	9.8	Route 138 (Kingstown Road)	Northern terminus
1.000 mi = 1.609 km; 1.000 km = 0.621 mi
