= Charlestown (CDP), Rhode Island =

Census-designated place in Rhode Island, United States

Charlestown, Rhode Island
- Census-designated place
- Location within Rhode Island Location within the United States
- Coordinates: 41°22′55″N 71°38′26″W
- Country: United States
- State: Rhode Island
- County: Washington
- Towns: Charlestown; South Kingstown

Area
  - Total: 2.84 sq mi (7.35 km^{2})
  - Land: 2.26 sq mi (5.86 km^{2})
  - Water: 0.58 sq mi (1.49 km^{2})
- Elevation: 22 ft (6.7 m)

Population (2020)
  - Total: 1,714
  - Density: 757.4/sq mi (292.42/km^{2})
- Time zone: UTC-5 (Eastern (EST))
  - Summer (DST): UTC-4 (EDT)
- ZIP Codes: 02813 (Charlestown); 02879 (Wakefield)
- Area code: 401
- FIPS code: 44-14320
- GNIS feature ID: 2631329

Charlestown is a census-designated place (CDP) in Washington County, Rhode Island, United States, comprising the main village in the town of Charlestown and additional land extending to the east into the town of South Kingstown. It was first listed as a CDP prior to the 2020 census.

Charlestown is in southern Washington County, on the north side of Ninigret Pond, a tidal lagoon connected to Block Island Sound. The community is in the southeastern part of the town of Charlestown and the southwestern section of the town of South Kingstown. The village of Charlestown is in the northwestern part of the CDP, at the northern head of Ninigret Pond. The hamlet of Charlestown Beach is in the southern part of the CDP, separated by a tidal inlet from the physical Charlestown Beach along the Atlantic. The CDP continues east into South Kingstown, on the north side of Green Hill Pond.

U.S. Route 1 forms the northern edge of the Charlestown CDP; the highway leads northeast 10 miles (16 km) to Narragansett and west 11 miles (18 km) to Westerly.

== Demographics ==
Historical population
Census	Pop.	Note	%±
2020	1,714		—
U.S. Decennial Census
