= Pettaquamscutt River =

Tidal extension of the Mattatuxet River in Rhode Island

Coordinates: 41.519083°N 71.445492°W

The Pettaquamscutt River (pet-uh-KWAHM-skit; also known as Narrow River) is a tidal extension of the Mattatuxet River in the U.S. state of Rhode Island. It flows approximately 6.3 miles (10.1 km). There are no dams along the river's length.

== Course ==
The river begins in name below Carr Pond Dam (on the Mattatuxet River) in North Kingstown. This dam is also the boundary between fresh and salt water. From here, the river flows south and becomes the boundary between South Kingstown and Narragansett. The river continues to Pettaquamscutt Cove then out to Narragansett Bay. The Pettaquamscutt River is also commonly known as the Narrow River, both because of a long narrow stretch from Lacy bridge to the Mettatuxett Yacht Club as well as the narrow, hazardous mouth of the river where it empties into Narragansett Bay. The river is composed of at least five distinct sections, running from north to south: the upper pond, the lake, the narrows, the flats, and the mouth.

== Crossings ==
Below is a list of all crossings over the Pettaquamscutt River. The list starts at the headwaters and goes downstream.

- North Kingstown
  - Gilbert Stuart Road
- South Kingstown
  - Bridgetown Road
  - Middlebridge Road
- Narragansett
  - Boston Neck Road (RI 1A)

The river is spanned by three bridges: Lacy Bridge, Middle Bridge, and Sprague Bridge.

== Tributaries ==
The Pettaquamscutt River has no named tributaries, though it has many unnamed tributaries that also feed it.

== See also ==
- List of rivers in Rhode Island
- Mattatuxet River
- Narragansett Bay
