= Rhode Island Route 112 =

State highway in Washington County, Rhode Island, US

Route 112

Route information
- Maintained by RIDOT
- Length: 8.5 mi (13.7 km)
- Existed: 1923–present

Major junctions
- South end: US 1 in Charlestown
- North end: Route 138 in Richmond

Location
- Country: United States
- State: Rhode Island
- Counties: Washington

Highway system
- Rhode Island Routes
← Route 110	→ Route 113

Route 112 is a numbered state highway running 8.5 miles (13.7 km) in the U.S. state of Rhode Island. It connects U.S. Route 1 (US 1) in the town center of Charlestown and Route 138 in the town of Richmond.

== Route description ==
Route 112 begins as South County Trail at US 1 in the center of Charlestown. It heads north overlapped with Route 2 for several miles up to the intersection with Carolina Back Road. The two routes separate here with Route 2 continuing northeast on South County Trail and Route 112 heading northwest on Carolina Back Road. Route 112 soon crosses into the village of Carolina within the town of Richmond. The road name changes to Main Street as the route passes through the village center. In Carolina, Route 112 has a junction with Route 91, which leads to the village of Alton. After leaving the village, Route 112 becomes Richmond Townhouse Road, continuing north for a few more miles until it ends at Route 138 near the Meadow Brook Golf Club.

== History ==
Route 112 was one of the state's original routes designated in 1923. At the time it was first designated, Route 112 extended beyond its current northern terminus to end at Route 3 (then Route 1A) in the village of Wyoming using modern Route 138. The route was truncated in the mid-1930s when Route 138 was extended west to the Connecticut state line.

== Major intersections ==
The entire route is in Washington County.

Location	mi	km	Destinations	Notes
Charlestown	0.0	0.0	US 1 south (Post Road) / Route 2	Southern terminus of Routes 2 and 112, northbound access to via nearby U-turn ramps
Charlestown	3.0	4.8	Route 2 north (South County Trail)	Northern terminus of concurrency with Route 2
Charlestown	5.2	8.4	Route 91 west (Alton Carolina Road)	Eastern terminus of Route 91
Richmond	8.5	13.7	Route 138 (Kingstown Road)	Northern terminus
1.000 mi = 1.609 km; 1.000 km = 0.621 mi: Concurrency terminus
