= Matunuck =

Village in South Kingstown, Rhode Island

Coordinates: 41°22′42″N 71°32′45″W

Matunuck (muh-TOO-nick) is a village in South Kingstown, Rhode Island, located near Charlestown. It is located on a point along the southern Atlantic coast of Rhode Island off U.S. Route 1.

== Geography and attractions ==
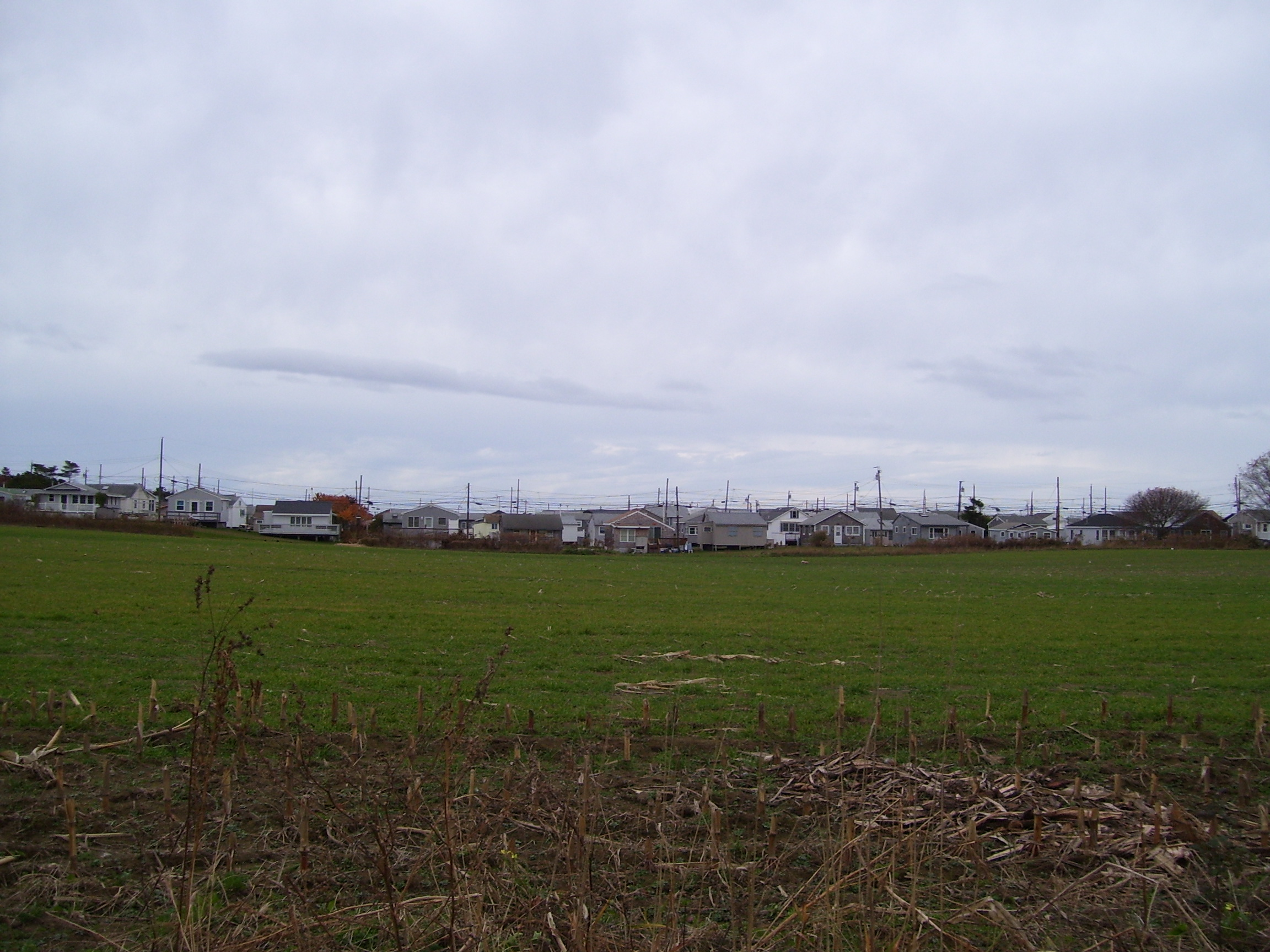
Matunuck's Roy Carpenter Beach cottages in 2008

The area is home to several notable beaches, including Moonstone Beach, South Kingstown Town Beach at Matunuck, East Matunuck State Beach, and Roy Carpenter's Beach and cottages. The Theatre-by-the-Sea playhouse is also in Matunuck and is listed on the National Register of Historic Places.

== Art Historical Significance ==
In the late 19th and early 20th centuries, Matunuck became a notable summer retreat for artists from Boston and Providence, RI and developed into a vibrant artist colony. Attracted by the beauty of the area's natural landscape, artists such as William Trost Richards and Philip Leslie Hale found inspiration in Matunuck's coastal vistas.

In 1898, Philip Leslie Hale formed the Matunuck Summer School of Painting and attracted artists, including Ellen Day Hale, Caroline Atkinson, Anna Richards Brewster, and Frank Mathewson, causing the art colony to flourish. The work they created varied in style, but reflected major trends in American art of the time, including Impressionism and plein-air painting.

In 2010, the Lyman Allyn Art Museum sponsored an exhibition of paintings created in Matunuck, Rhode Island, at the turn of the 20th century. This was the first comprehensive exhibition of the Matunuck Artist Colony and included work by nine artists. The exhibition, A Sense of Place: Painters of Matunuck, Rhode Island 1873-1941, was curated by art historian Lindsay Leard-Coolidge and coincided with the publication of her book on the artist colony, by the same title.
