= Pettaquamscutt Rock =

Coordinates: 41.4710°N 71.4545°W

Pettaquamscutt Rock (pet-uh-KWAHM-skit; also known as Treaty Rock) is a rock formation (pillar) in the town of South Kingstown in the U.S. state of Rhode Island. The rock was the scene of 17th-century treaties between white settlers and the Narragansett people.
