= South Kingstown, Rhode Island =

- Town
- Town of South Kingstown
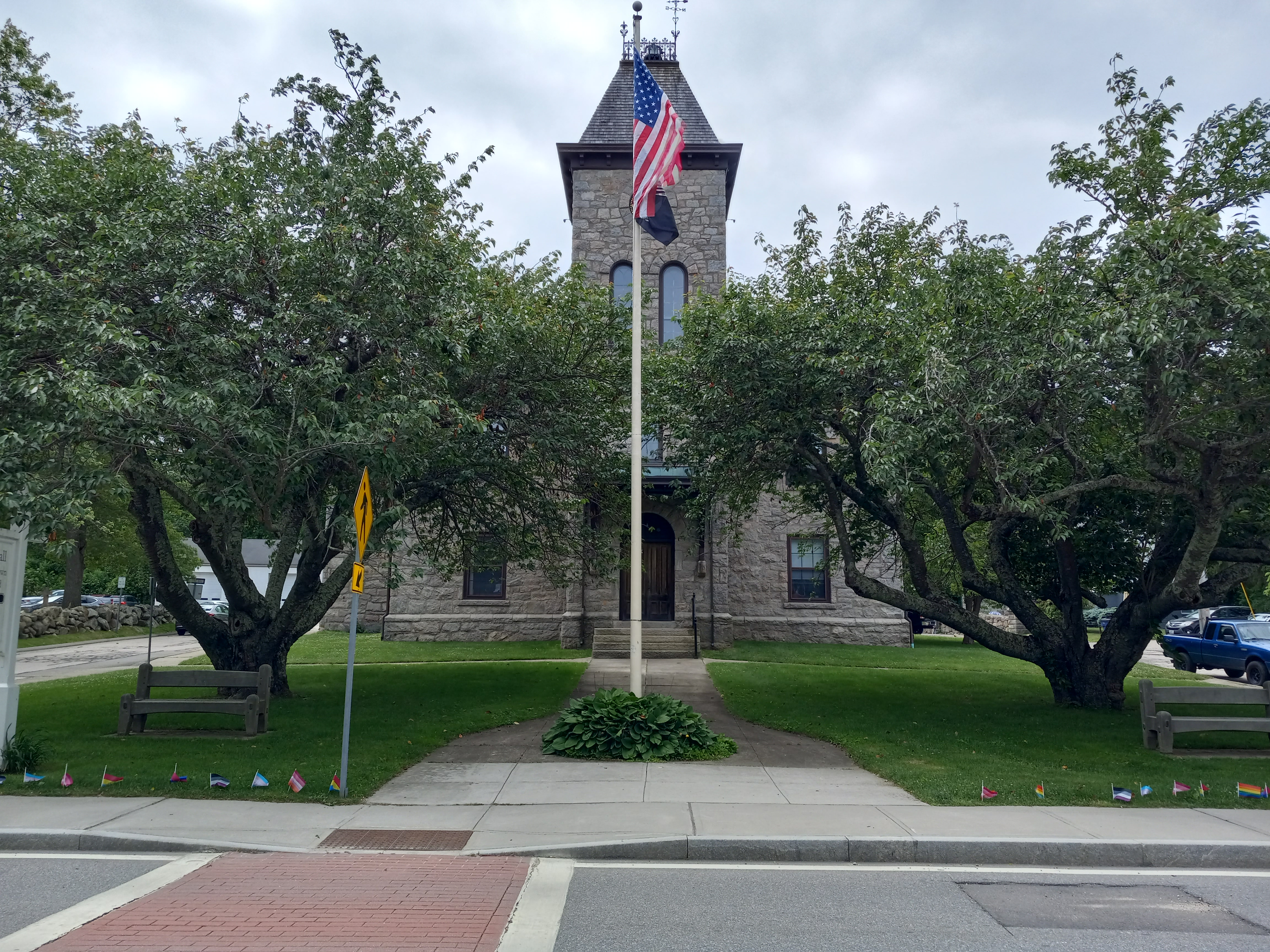
- South Kingstown Town Hall

- Seal Logo
- Nickname: "SK"
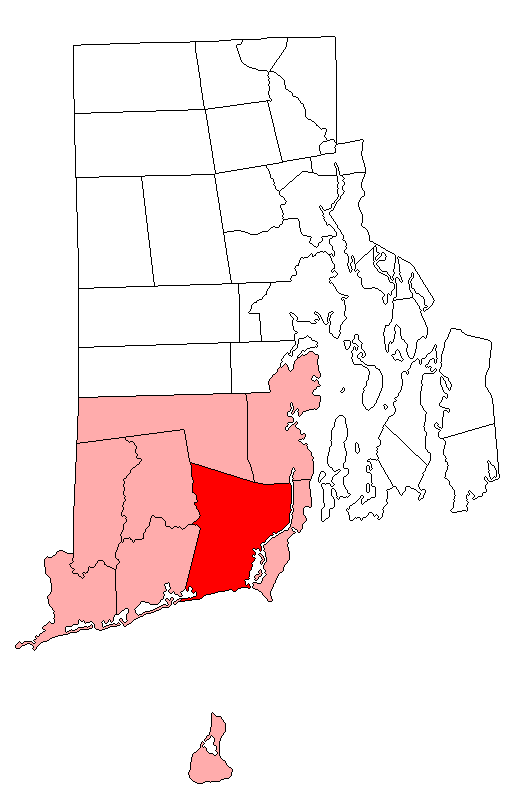
- Location of South Kingstown in Washington County, Rhode Island
- Coordinates: 41°26′51″N 71°31′38″W
- Country: United States
- State: Rhode Island
- County: Washington
- Historic colonies: Colony of Rhode Island and Providence Plantations
- Settled: 1641
- Split from Kings Towne: 1723
- Incorporated: 1723

Government
  - Type: Council–manager government
  - Town Council: Rory McEntee (President) (D); Michael Marran (Vice President) (D); Patricia Alley (D); Jay G. Wegimont (D); Deborah Bergner (D)
  - Town Manager: James Manni
  - R.I. Senators: Senators: V. Susan Sosnowski (D); Bridget Valverde (D); Victoria Gu (D)
  - R.I. House delegation: Representatives: Carol McEntee (D); Teresa Tanzi (D); Kathleen Fogarty (D); Tina Spears (D)

Area
  - Total: 79.8 sq mi (206.6 km^{2})
  - Land: 57.1 sq mi (147.9 km^{2})
  - Water: 22.7 sq mi (58.7 km^{2})
- Elevation: 98 ft (30 m)

Population (2020)
  - Total: 31,913
  - Density: 559/sq mi (215.9/km^{2})
- Time zone: UTC-5 (Eastern (EST))
  - Summer (DST): UTC-4 (EDT)
- ZIP codes: 02879 (Wakefield), 02881 (Kingston), 02883 (Peace Dale), 02892 (West Kingston)
- Area code: 401
- FIPS code: 44-67460
- GNIS feature ID: 1220090
- Website: https://www.southkingstownri.gov/

South Kingstown is a town in, and the county seat of, Washington County, Rhode Island, United States. The population was 31,931 at the 2020 census. South Kingstown is the second largest town in Rhode Island by total geographic area, behind New Shoreham, and the third largest town in Rhode Island by geographic land area, behind Exeter and Coventry.

== History ==
The Narragansett Indians were known to occupy a winter camp in the Great Swamp, within present day South Kingstown.

In March 1638, Rhode Island founder Roger Williams signed an agreement with two Sachems of the Narragansett Tribe, Canonicus and Miantonomoh, establishing the boundaries between the Narragansett Tribe and the Colony of Rhode Island, as well as to purchase Aquidneck Island. The agreement was signed at Pettaquamscutt Rock, which is now a part of South Kingstown. Twenty years later, on January 20, 1658, Roger Williams again met with the Sachems of the Narragansett Tribe to purchase much of the area that is now present-day Washington County, including South Kingstown, in what is now known as the Pettaquamscutt Purchase of 1658. This agreement was also signed at Pettaquamscutt Rock.

South Kingstown was sparsely populated and mostly inhabited by farmers in the late seventeenth and early eighteenth century, due to the high demand for livestock and produce in Newport, and land speculators who wanted to hold the land to resell when more settlers inevitably came into the area. Widespread population of the land was discouraged due to a speculation company known as the Atherton Syndicate buying up land to resell, the powerful Narragansett Nation discouraging settlements, and a dispute over the land with neighboring Connecticut. Over time, most of these problems slowly went away with time. In the late 1660s, the Atherton Syndicate was run off to join Connecticut in its dispute over the territory and eventually going bankrupt. In 1675 the Great Swamp Fight, a battle of King Philip's War fought by the New England Confederation, essentially wiped out the Narragansett. However, in retaliation the Narragansett razed most of the settlements in South Kingstown, including Little Rest, the largest. After the destruction of Little Rest, the land was described as a "desolate wilderness". Finally, in 1723, Connecticut conceded that the territory belonged to Rhode Island, after decades of lobbying before the Court of St James's in London. In the same year, the Rhode Island General Assembly split the town of Kingstown into the towns of North Kingstown and South Kingstown. The towns were formally incorporated on February 25, 1723.

In 1888 a narrow strip of land running along the eastern bank of the Pettaquamscutt River to the shore of Narragansett Bay was separated from South Kingstown to form the town of Narragansett.

== Geography ==
According to the United States Census Bureau, the town has a total area of 79.8 square miles (206.6 km²), of which 57.1 square miles (148 km^{2}) is land and 22.7 square miles (59 km^{2}) (28.43%) is water.

South Kingstown includes the villages of Kingston, West Kingston, Wakefield, Peace Dale, Usquepaug, Snug Harbor, Tuckertown, East Matunuck, Matunuck, Green Hill, Perryville, and part of Charlestown. Peace Dale and Wakefield are treated as a census-designated place called Wakefield-Peacedale. Charlestown, which primarily lies in the town of the same name, is also treated as a CDP. Ocean Ridge, Indian Lake, Curtis Corner, and Torrey Hill are among the other small areas that are regarded as unique localities, although official distinctions are less clear. Middlebridge, located on the west side of Narrow River, is a densely populated neighborhood in the town.

=== Climate ===
According to the Köppen climate classification, South Kingstown has either a hot-summer humid continental climate (abbreviated Dfa), or a hot-summer humid sub-tropical climate (abbreviated Cfa), depending on the isotherm used.

Climate data for South Kingstown, 1991–2020 simulated normals (43 ft elevation)
Month	Jan	Feb	Mar	Apr	May	Jun	Jul	Aug	Sep	Oct	Nov	Dec	Year
Mean daily maximum °F (°C)	38.3 (3.5)	39.9 (4.4)	45.9 (7.7)	55.2 (12.9)	64.8 (18.2)	73.6 (23.1)	79.5 (26.4)	79.0 (26.1)	73.2 (22.9)	63.0 (17.2)	52.9 (11.6)	43.9 (6.6)	59.1 (15.1)
Daily mean °F (°C)	30.6 (−0.8)	32.0 (0.0)	37.9 (3.3)	47.1 (8.4)	56.5 (13.6)	65.8 (18.8)	71.8 (22.1)	71.1 (21.7)	65.1 (18.4)	54.7 (12.6)	45.0 (7.2)	36.3 (2.4)	51.2 (10.6)
Mean daily minimum °F (°C)	22.6 (−5.2)	23.9 (−4.5)	30.0 (−1.1)	39.0 (3.9)	48.4 (9.1)	58.1 (14.5)	64.0 (17.8)	63.3 (17.4)	57.0 (13.9)	46.4 (8.0)	37.0 (2.8)	28.8 (−1.8)	43.2 (6.2)
Average precipitation inches (mm)	4.14 (105.25)	3.68 (93.44)	5.41 (137.49)	4.77 (121.07)	3.64 (92.42)	3.94 (99.95)	3.22 (81.71)	4.00 (101.71)	4.01 (101.83)	4.86 (123.50)	4.32 (109.83)	5.19 (131.73)	51.18 (1,299.93)
Average dew point °F (°C)	20.8 (−6.2)	21.4 (−5.9)	26.4 (−3.1)	35.6 (2.0)	46.6 (8.1)	57.2 (14.0)	63.7 (17.6)	63.1 (17.3)	57.2 (14.0)	46.0 (7.8)	35.4 (1.9)	27.3 (−2.6)	41.7 (5.4)
Source: PRISM Climate Group

=== Adjacent towns ===
- Charlestown – southwest
- Exeter – northwest
- Narragansett – east
- North Kingstown – northeast
- Richmond – northwest

South Kingstown is bordered on the south by Block Island Sound.

== Demographics ==
Historical population
Census	Pop.	Note	%±
1790	4,131		—
1800	3,438		−16.8%
1810	3,560		3.5%
1820	3,723		4.6%
1830	3,663		−1.6%
1840	3,717		1.5%
1850	3,807		2.4%
1860	4,717		23.9%
1870	4,493		−4.7%
1880	5,114		13.8%
1890	4,823		−5.7%
1900	4,972		3.1%
1910	5,176		4.1%
1920	5,181		0.1%
1930	6,010		16.0%
1940	7,282		21.2%
1950	10,148		39.4%
1960	11,942		17.7%
1970	16,913		41.6%
1980	20,414		20.7%
1990	24,631		20.7%
2000	27,921		13.4%
2010	30,639		9.7%
2020	31,931		4.2%
U.S. Decennial Census

As of the census of 2020, there were 31,931 people and 11,363 households in the town. The population density was 559.0 inhabitants per square mile (215.8/km^{2}). There were 13,771 housing units in the town. The racial makeup of the town was 85.75% White, 2.22% African American, 1.1% Native American, 3.18% Asian, 0.02% Pacific Islander, 2.81% from other races, and 4.92% from two or more races. Hispanic or Latino of any race were 4.39% of the population.

There were 11,363 households, out of which 24.3% had children under the age of 18 living with them, 57.9% were married couples living together, 23.2% had a female householder with no spouse present, and 13.3% had a male householder with no spouse present. 10.6% of all households were made up of individuals, and 4.5% had someone living alone who was 65 years of age or older. The average household size was 2.33 and the average family size was 2.83.

In the town the population was spread out, with 14.8% under the age of 18, 22.3% from 18 to 24, 19.6% from 25 to 44, 21.4% from 45 to 64, and 21.9% who were 65 years of age or older. The median age was 38.9 years.

The median income for a household in the town was $111,063, and the median income for a family was $127,560. The per capita income for the town was $46,636. About 7.6% of the population was below the poverty line, including 9.7% of those under age 18 and 4.1% of those age 65 or over.

== Arts and culture ==
Art galleries include the Hera Gallery (Wakefield), South County Art Association (Kingston), and sometimes the Courthouse Center for the Arts (or CCA, West Kingston). Theaters include The Contemporary Theater Company (Wakefield), the Theatre-by-the-Sea (Matunuck), and the CCA. The sole cinema is South County Cinema 8 (Wakefield), which replaced the independently run Campus Cinema (Wakefield) in the early 2000s. There are numerous venues for music and other entertainment, including the University of Rhode Island's Ryan Center and smaller venues such as Lily Pads (Peace Dale), and the CCA.

Arts and cultural education is also offered through community centers like The Guild and the Senior Center in Wakefield. There are also three public libraries which are located in Kingston, Matunuck, and Peace Dale.

=== Museums ===
The South County History Center, located in the village of Kingston, is located in a former jail building and contains a collection of fine Early American artifacts. The Peace Dale Museum of Art and Culture founded by Caroline Hazard in the village of Peace Dale in South Kingstown holds in its collections artifacts of the local Narragansett People and from indigenous cultures around the world.

=== Points of interest ===
South Kingstown is the location of the deadly Great Swamp Fight that occurred during King Philip's War in 1675. The battle site is commemorated by a rough granite shaft about twenty feet high. Around the mound on which the shaft stands are four granite markers engraved with the names of the colonies which took part in the battle. South Kingstown is home to 31 sites listed on the National Register of Historic Places, 4 of which are historic districts. A driving tour is described by the Pettaquamscutt Historical Society.

- Kingston Village Historic District, located in the village of Kingston
- Peace Dale Historic District, located in the village of Peace Dale
- Usquepaug Road Historic District, located near the village of Usquepaug
- Wakefield Historic District, located in the village of Wakefield
- Hannah Robinson Tower, located on McSparran Hill

== Sports ==
The Ocean State Waves of the New England Collegiate Baseball League play their home games at Old Mountain Field.

== Parks and recreation ==
South Kingstown has over ten miles of undisturbed beaches. South Kingstown has also recently made an upgrade to their town's parks and recreation by building the South Kingstown Recreation Center located at 30 St. Dominic Rd.

== Government ==
All five seats on the town council are at-large seats that are up for election every two years, with no term limits. After each election, the newly elected council members elect two of their own as president and vice president. The current president is Rory McEntee, and the current vice president is Michael Marran.

=== Representation in state legislature ===
South Kingstown is represented in the Rhode Island House of Representatives by Carol McEntee (D), Teresa Tanzi (D),Kathleen Fogarty (D) and Tina Spears (D). The town is represented in the Rhode Island Senate by Bridget Valverde (D), Susan Sosnowski (D), and Victoria Gu (D).

== Education ==
South Kingstown is served by the South Kingstown School District. The district includes nine schools that serve students in grades prekindergarten to twelfth.

=== Pre-kindergarten (Pre-K) ===
- South Kingstown Inclusionary Pre-School, located in the village of Wakefield

=== Elementary schools ===
- Matunuck Elementary School, located in the village of Matunuck
- Peace Dale Elementary School, located in the village of Peace Dale
- West Kingston Elementary School, located in the village of West Kingston
- Kingston Hill Academy, a public charter school located in the village of Kingston
- The Compass School, a public charter school located in the village of Kingston

=== Middle schools ===
- Broad Rock Middle School, located in the village of Wakefield
- (This school is no longer in service) Curtis Corner Middle School, located in the village of Wakefield

=== High schools ===
- Independence Transition Academy, located in the village of Kingston
- South Kingstown High School, located in the village of Wakefield

=== Colleges and universities ===
The University of Rhode Island is located in the village of Kingston.

=== Private schools ===
- Monsignor Clarke School, a K-8 Catholic school located in the village of Wakefield
- The Prout School, a Catholic high school located in the village of Wakefield

== Infrastructure ==
=== Emergency services ===
Law enforcement is maintained by the South Kingstown Police Department, located in the village of Peace Dale. The Rhode Island State Police Wickford Barracks, located in the Town of North Kingstown, has jurisdiction.

South Kingstown fire protection is provided by the Union Fire District of South Kingstown, a volunteer department.

South County Hospital is located in the village of Wakefield.

=== Transportation ===
==== Roads ====
Roads in South Kingstown include U.S. Route 1, Route 1A, Route 2, Route 108, Route 110, and Route 138.

==== Rail ====
Rail service is provided by Amtrak via Kingston Station, which is located in the village of West Kingston. Kingston is a stop along Amtrak's Northeast Corridor and is serviced by the Northeast Regional train service. The Northeast Regional has a northern terminus with South Station in Boston with a major stop en route in Providence, and has a southern terminus with Washington Union Station in Washington, D.C. with major stops en route in New Haven, New York City, Philadelphia, Wilmington, and Baltimore.

==== Public transportation ====
Public transportation in South Kingstown is provided by the statewide Rhode Island Public Transit Authority or RIPTA. The following routes service South Kingstown:

- 64 Newport / URI – Link
- 65X Wakefield Express – Link
- 66 URI / Galilee – Link

=== Utilities ===
==== Electricity ====
Electricity services are provided by Rhode Island Energy.

==== Telephone ====
Local and long distance landline telephone services are provided by Verizon New England.
