= Wakefield-Peacedale, Rhode Island =

Census-designated place in Rhode Island, United States

- CDP
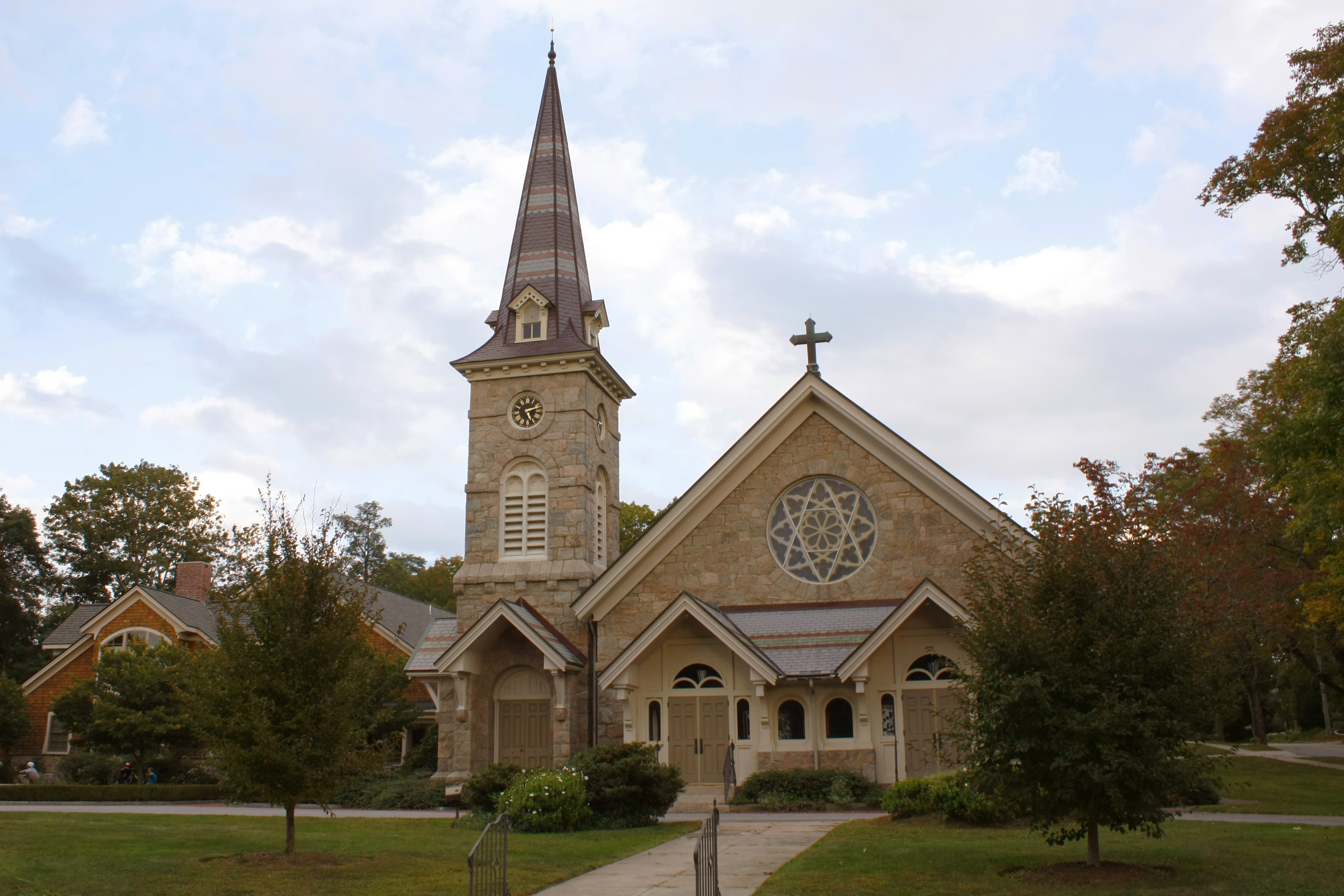
- Peace Dale Congregational Church

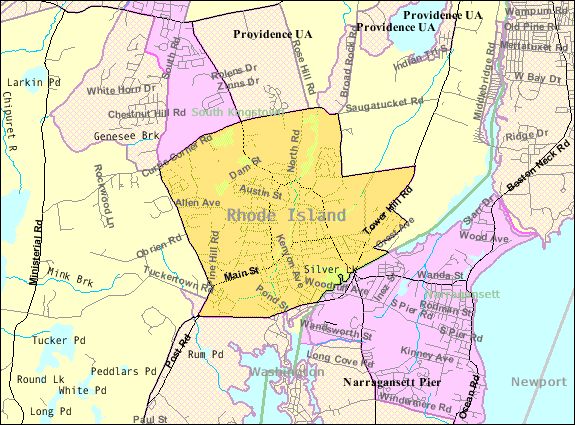
- Map of Wakefield-Peacedale with its boundaries in 2000
- Coordinates: 41°26′28″N 71°29′57″W
- Country: United States
- State: Rhode Island
- County: Washington

Area
  - Total: 5.1 sq mi (13.2 km^{2})
  - Land: 4.9 sq mi (12.6 km^{2})
  - Water: 0.23 sq mi (0.6 km^{2})

Population (2010)
  - Total: 8,487
  - Density: 1,739/sq mi (671.6/km^{2})
- Time zone: UTC-5 (Eastern (EST))
  - Summer (DST): UTC-4 (EDT)
- FIPS code: 44-73130

Wakefield-Peacedale (listed as "Wakefield-Peace Dale" by the United States Census Bureau) is a census-designated place (CDP) in the town of South Kingstown in Washington County, Rhode Island, United States that includes the villages of Peace Dale and Wakefield. According to the 2020 census, its population was 8,925.

== Geography ==
Wakefield-Peacedale is located at 41°26′28″N 71°29′57″W (41.441234, -71.499290).

According to the United States Census Bureau, the CDP has a total area of 5.1 mi^{2} (13 km^{2}), of which 4.9 mi^{2} (13 km^{2}) is land and 0.2 mi^{2} (0.52 km^{2}) (4.70%) is water.

== Media ==
The IndependentRI (South County Newspapers) publish weekly from Main Street in Wakefield, covering South Kingstown, North Kingstown, Narragansett and The University of Rhode Island.

== Demographics ==
=== 2020 census ===
The 2020 United States census counted 8,925 people, 3,751 households, and 2,641 families in Wakefield-Peacedale. The population density was 1,810.3 people per square mile (699.0 people/km^{2}). There were 4,027 housing units at an average density of 816.8 units per square mile (315.4 units/km^{2}). The racial makeup was 84.18% (7,513) white or European American (83.62% non-Hispanic white), 2.1% (187) black or African-American, 3.11% (278) Native American or Alaska Native, 2.04% (182) Asian, 0.03% (3) Pacific Islander or Native Hawaiian, 1.48% (132) from other races, and 7.06% (630) from two or more races. Hispanic or Latino of any race was 3.98% (355) of the population.

Of the 3,751 households, 23.1% had children under the age of 18; 43.5% were married couples living together; 32.0% had a female householder with no spouse or partner present. 32.6% of households consisted of individuals and 17.4% had someone living alone who was 65 years of age or older. The average household size was 2.4 and the average family size was 2.9. The percent of those with a bachelor's degree or higher was estimated to be 38.6% of the population.

19.2% of the population was under the age of 18, 7.6% from 18 to 24, 22.2% from 25 to 44, 28.1% from 45 to 64, and 22.9% who were 65 years of age or older. The median age was 45.9 years. For every 100 females, the population had 110.4 males. For every 100 females ages 18 and older, there were 113.1 males.

The 2016–2020 5-year American Community Survey estimates show that the median household income was $87,684 (with a margin of error of +/- $22,963) and the median family income was $111,016 (+/- $15,344). Males had a median income of $44,708 (+/- $18,824) versus $25,422 (+/- $7,849) for females. The median income for those above 16 years old was $33,509 (+/- $7,659). Approximately, 4.6% of families and 6.8% of the population were below the poverty line, including 8.8% of those under the age of 18 and 3.8% of those ages 65 or over.

2010 census

The 2020 census showed 8,487 residents, 3,445 households, and 2,401 families in Wakefield-Peacedale. There were 3,720 total housing units. The racial makeup was 90.27% (7,662) white or European American, 1.8% (157) Black or African American, 2.6% (221) Native American or Alaska Native, 1.39% (118) Asian, 0.0001% (1) Pacific Islander or Native Hawaiian, 0.6% (59) from other races, and 2.6% (227) from two or more races.

=== 2000 census ===
At the 2000 census, there were 8,468 people, 3,221 households and 2,174 families residing in the CDP. The population density was 671.4 people/km^{2} (1,739 people/mi^{2}). There were 3,385 housing units at an average density of 268.4 units/km^{2} (695 units/mi^{2}). The racial makeup of the CDP was 90.34% White, 2.01% African American, 3.08% Native American, 1.23% Asian, 0.56% from other races, and 2.79% from two or more races. Hispanic or Latino of any race were 1.56% of the population.

There were 3,221 households, of which 36.5% had children under the age of 18 living with them, 50.4% were married couples living together, 13.1% had a female householder with no husband present, and 32.5% were non-families. 25.8% of all households were made up of individuals, and 10.2% had someone living alone who was 65 years of age or older. The average household size was 2.58 and the average family size was 3.14.

28.4% of the population were under the age of 18, 6.5% from 18 to 24, 29.6% from 25 to 44, 22.2% from 45 to 64, and 13.2% who were 65 years of age or older. The median age was 37 years. For every 100 females, there were 87.8 males. For every 100 females age 18 and over, there were 83.4 males.

The median household income was $50,313 and the median family income was $61,541. Males had a median income of $47,470 compared with $26,922 for females. The per capita income was $24,191. About 3.9% of families and 5.4% of the population were below the poverty line, including 4.4% of those under age 18 and 6.0% of those age 65 or over.
