= South County Hospital =

- Independent

Geography
- Location: Wakefield, Rhode Island, New England, Rhode Island, United States
- Coordinates: 41.4311°N 71.49647°W

Organization
- Care system: Private
- Type: General

Services
- Beds: 100

History
- Founded: 1919

Links
- Website: www.southcountyhealth.org
- Lists: Hospitals in Rhode Island
- Other links: List of hospitals in Rhode Island

South County Hospital is an independent, non-profit acute care hospital serving southern Rhode Island. It is located in Wakefield, Rhode Island.

== Overview ==
The hospital is the flagship facility of South County Health, which also contains VNS Home Health Services (a visiting nurse and home health agency), South County Surgical Supply (home medical supplies), and South County Quality Care (private duty nursing and home care). The hospital is accredited by the Joint Commission.

The system also operates an urgent care, off-site facility in East Greenwich, RI. South County Hospital Healthcare System employs 1,300 people.

== History ==
The hospital was founded in 1919 in a small, private home. A new facility was built in 1925 on 6 acres (2.4 ha) with funding primarily from Hazard family members Caroline Hazard and her sister Helen Hazard Bacon. Since then, South County Hospital has grown to a 100-bed facility sprawling over 345,000 square feet (32,100 m^{2}). The oldest building on the campus, housing the President's office, dates back to 1929.

South County is 35 miles (56 km) south of Providence, Rhode Island and serves a population of around 100,000. Louis Giancola is the current CEO of the South County Hospital Healthcare System.

== Awards and recognition ==
In September 2013, Consumer Reports ranked South County as the best hospital in Rhode Island for surgical care. The ranking was based on the percentage of any hospital's surgery patients who died in the hospital or stayed longer than expected.

Harvard Pilgrim Health Care placed South County Hospital on its 2012 Hospital Honor Roll. The list recognizes acute care hospitals whose performance is among the top 25% of nationally measured metrics on composite quality and patient experience.

In 2008, South County Hospital was ranked among the best-performing hospitals in the nation for maternity practices in infant nutrition and care, based on a nationwide U.S. Department of Health and Human Services review of 2,690 facilities.

In 2012, South County Hospital became the first New England hospital to receive the Pathway to Excellence designation by the American Nurses Credentialing Center.

The hospital collaborates with Johns Hopkins University in the Rhode Island Care Unit Collaborative, a voluntary program focused on improving patient care in the ICU and lowering infections. South County Hospital has an 87% survival rate for patients with sepsis, compared to the national mortality rate of 25–50%.

In Jan. 2013, GoLocal ranked South County as the best hospital in New England and Rhode Island based on patient satisfaction. In GoLocal's analysis of more than 50,000 government-sponsored patient surveys in New England, 83% of respondents gave the facility a score of 9 or 10, 76% said they received help as soon as they wanted, and 84% reported the nurses always communicated well with them.

== See also ==
- List of hospitals in Rhode Island
