= Rhode Island Route 138 =

Highway in Rhode Island

Route 138
- RI-138 highlighted in red

Route information
- Maintained by RIDOT and RITBA
- Length: 48.3 mi (77.7 km)
- Existed: 1922 (north of Newport); 1932 (west of Newport)–present

Major junctions
- West end: Route 138 at the Connecticut state line
- I-95 in Richmond; US 1 in North Kingstown; Route 24 / Route 77 in Tiverton
- North end: Route 138 at the Massachusetts state line

Location
- Country: United States
- State: Rhode Island
- Counties: Washington, Newport

Highway system
- Rhode Island Routes
← Route 136	→ Route 142
← Route 216	Route 238	→ Route 246

Route 138 is a numbered State Highway running 48.3 miles (77.7 km) in Rhode Island. It is the longest state numbered route in Rhode Island, and is the state's second longest highway after US 1. Route 138 begins in Exeter at the Connecticut state line in the west and runs to the Massachusetts state line in Tiverton in the east, and is the only state-numbered route to completely cross Rhode Island. Route 138 also keeps the same route number on the other side of both state lines.

Route 138 is a major thoroughfare in southern Rhode Island. The route ultimately connects Interstate 95 and the University of Rhode Island campus with the island town of Jamestown, the city of Newport, as well as the Tiverton-Little Compton coastal region. At the Massachusetts border in Fall River, the route continues as Massachusetts Route 138, which extends north into the Greater Boston area.

== Route description ==
Route 138 enters Rhode Island from the west at the Connecticut state line in Exeter for a brief 0.5 mile (0.80 km) stretch as Spring Street. For the next 5.2 miles (8.4 km), Route 138 passes through Hopkinton first as Spring Street, then Nooseneck Hill Road, and lastly Main Street where it enters Richmond for the next 6.0 miles (9.7 km); in Richmond, Route 138 is Main Street and Kingstown Road and has a junction with Interstate 95. The Route next passes through South Kingstown for 8.9 miles (14.3 km) first as Usquepaugh Road, next Kingstown Road where it passes the University of Rhode Island and becomes Mooresfield Road until an intersection with US 1, with a 2.5 mile (4.2 km) long concurrency as Tower Hill Road which crosses into North Kingstown. After its concurrency with US 1, Route 138 goes for another 2.6 miles (4.2 km) until it reaches the Jamestown-Verrazano Bridge, crossing into Jamestown. After 2.7 miles (4.4 km), Route 138 reaches the Newport Pell Bridge, where it crosses the Newport city line. In Newport, Route 138 lasts for 1.6 miles (2.6 km) and becomes Admiral Kalbfus Road until it reaches Middletown as West Main Road and East Main Road for a total of 3.2 miles (5.1 km). Route 138 finishes its stretch through Aquidneck Island in Portsmouth for 8.5 miles (13.7 km) as East Main Road and a convergence with Route 24 for 2.1 miles (3.4 km) until it reaches Tiverton, which contains the remaining 3.1 miles (5.0 km) of Rhode Island Route 138 as Main Road to the Massachusetts state line at Route 138.

== History ==
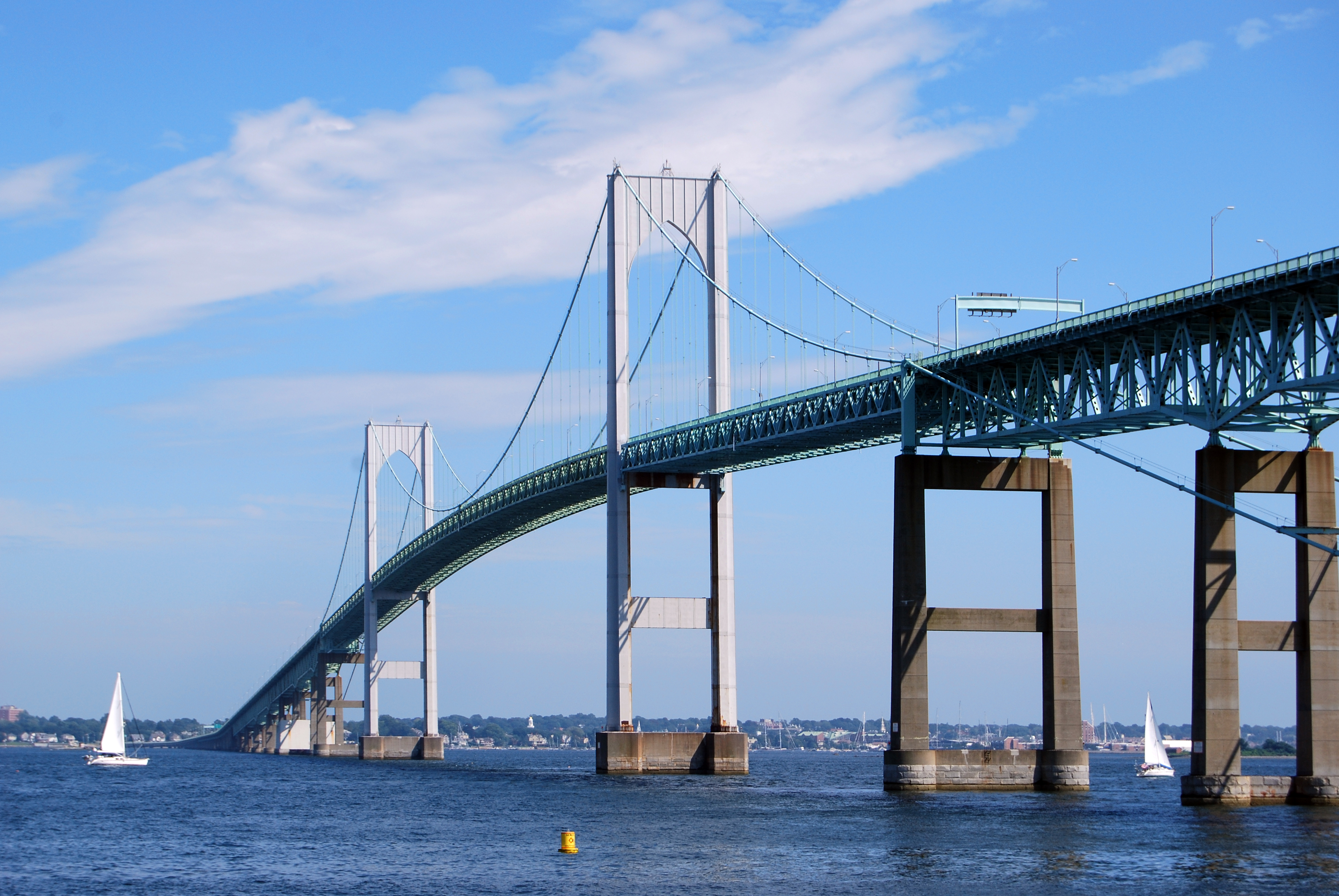
The Newport Pell Bridge, which RI 138 runs on.

Route 138 used the Stone Bridge over the Sakonnet River until 1954.

Before the opening of the Jamestown section of the Route 138 Expressway in 1994, Route 138 came off the Jamestown Bridge and used Eldred Avenue (which has now been partially cut off by the expressway) and East Shore Road to the Newport Pell Bridge. As of 2005, there is still a Route 138 reassurance marker northbound on East Shore Road just north of the Newport Pell Bridge.

Prior to the construction of the Route 138 Expressway in North Kingstown, Route 138 used Bridgetown Road east of US 1 in South Kingstown, then north on Route 1A into North Kingstown, then along an access road to the Jamestown-Verrazano Bridge which was upgraded on the spot to the Route 138 Expressway.

There are two abandoned temporary ramps at the west end of the Jamestown Bridge used by through traffic in the early 1990s. These ramps connected through traffic to the old bridge while the new one was being built. The new Jamestown–Verrazzano Bridge opened in 1992. These ramps have since been converted into access points to the local beaches.

The Route 138 Expressway was intended to extend west to Interstate 95.

Route 138 officially goes from being signed east–west to being signed north–south at the intersection of Admiral Kalbfus Road and West Main Road on the Middletown–Newport line.

== Major intersections ==
County	Location	mi	km	Old exit	New exit	Destinations	Notes
Washington	Exeter	0.0	0.0			Route 138 west	Continuation into Connecticut
Washington	Hope Valley	5.6	9.0			Route 3 south (Main Street)	Western end of Route 3 concurrency
Washington	Wyoming	6.6	10.6			Route 3 north (Main Street)	Eastern end of Route 3 concurrency
Washington	Wyoming	7.1	11.4			I-95 – Westerly, Providence	Exit 7 on I-95; partial cloverleaf interchange
Washington	Richmond	9.1	14.6			Route 112 south (Richmond Townhouse Road)	Northern terminus of Route 112
Washington	West Kingston	14.5	23.3			Route 2 (South County Trail)	
Washington	West Kingston	15.9	25.6			Route 110 south (Ministerial Road)	Northern terminus of Route 110
Washington	Kingston	17.5	28.2			Route 108 south (Kingstown Road)	Northern terminus of Route 108
Washington	South Kingstown	21.0	33.8			US 1 south – Westerly	Western end of US 1 concurrency
Washington	North Kingstown	23.3	37.5	Western end of freeway section			
Washington	North Kingstown	23.3	37.5			US 1 north – Providence	Eastern end of US 1 concurrency; cloverleaf interchange
Washington	North Kingstown	25.6	41.2			Route 1A – Wickford, Narragansett	
Narragansett Bay West Passage		26.2– 27.4	42.2– 44.1	Jamestown Verrazzano Bridge			
Newport	Jamestown	27.8	44.7			Helm Street	Eastbound exit and entrance
Newport	Jamestown	27.8	44.7			Beacon Avenue	Westbound exit and entrance
Newport	Jamestown	29.6	47.6			Jamestown	Access via Conanicus Boulevard/East Shore Road; last eastbound exit before toll
Newport	Narragansett Bay; East Passage	30.2– 32.1	48.6– 51.7	Claiborne Pell Newport Bridge (tolled)			
Newport	Newport	32.4	52.1	Eastern end of freeway section			
Newport	Newport	32.4	52.1			Route 238 south (JT Connell Highway) – Downtown Newport	Northern terminus of Route 238; last westbound exit before toll
Newport	Middletown	34.5	55.5			Route 114 north (West Main Road)	Southern terminus of Route 114
Newport	Middletown	34.9	56.2			Route 214 (Valley Road)	
Newport	Middletown	35.5	57.1			Route 138A south (Aquidneck Avenue)	Northern terminus of Route 138A
Newport	Portsmouth	43.3	69.7	Southern end of freeway section			
Newport	Portsmouth	43.3	69.7		2	Route 24 south / Boyds Lane – Middletown, Newport, Bristol	Southern end of Route 24 concurrency; Boyds Lane is used to access the nearby Mount Hope Bridge
Newport	Portsmouth	44.8	72.1		3	Hummocks Avenue / Anthony Road / Common Fence Point / Island Park	Signed for Hummocks Avenue northbound, Anthony Road/Island Park southbound
Newport	Sakonnet River	45.0– 45.3	72.4– 72.9	Sakonnet River Bridge			
Newport	Tiverton	45.3	72.9	4		To Route 77 / Route 177 – Tiverton, Little Compton	Former northbound exit and southbound entrance
Newport	Tiverton	45.6	73.4	5	4	Route 24 north / Route 77 south (Main Road) to Route 177 – Fall River, MA, Taunton, MA, Boston, MA, Cape Cod, Tiverton, Little Compton	Northern end of Route 24 concurrency; northern terminus of Route 77
Newport	Tiverton	45.6	73.4	Northern end of freeway section			
Newport	Tiverton	48.3	77.7			Route 138 north – Fall River	Continuation into Massachusetts
1.000 mi = 1.609 km; 1.000 km = 0.621 mi: Closed/former; Concurrency terminus; Incomplete access; Tolled

== Related routes ==
=== Route 138A ===
Route 138A
- Location: Newport–Middletown
- Length: 4.6 mi (7.4 km)

Route 138A is a numbered state highway running 4.6 miles (7.4 km) through Newport and Middletown, Rhode Island. Route 138A is a "scenic route" highway that begins at Route 238 at the intersection of America's Cup Avenue and Gladys Carr Bolhouse Road (which goes to Goat Island) where it follows America's Cup Avenue southwards, travels through downtown Newport along Memorial Boulevard, past the Newport beaches, and north through Middletown along Aquidneck Avenue where it connects with Route 138 (East Main Road).

Most of the streets along Route 138A were built after 1965. Route 138A never represented an old alignment of Route 138.

Major intersections
The entire route is in Newport County.

Location	mi	km	Destinations	Notes
Newport	0.0	0.0	Route 238 (America's Cup Avenue) to Route 138 – Goat Island	Southern terminus
Newport	0.9	1.4	Bellevue Avenue	
Middletown	2.3	3.7	Purgatory Road	
Middletown	2.6	4.2	Route 214 north (Valley Road)	Southern terminus of Route 214
Middletown	3.6	5.8	Green End Avenue	
Middletown	4.6	7.4	Route 138 (East Main Road)	Northern terminus
1.000 mi = 1.609 km; 1.000 km = 0.621 mi

=== Route 238 ===
Route 238
- Location: Newport
- Length: 1.7 mi (2.7 km)
- Existed: ?–2023

Route 238 was a numbered state highway running 1.4 miles (2.3 km) in Newport, Rhode Island. Its southern terminus was at Thames Street in Newport, and its northern terminus was at Route 138 in Newport. This route was retired in 2023 and its entire alignment was added to Route 138A, though many Route 238 signs remain in place along America's Cup Avenue. It began at the intersection of Halsey Boulevard, the Newport Bridge, and the J.T. Connell Connector. It ran south along J.T. Connell Highway, Farewell Street, and America's Cup Avenue, ending at the intersection with Thames Street and Memorial Boulevard where it became Route 138A.

Major intersections
The entire route was in Newport, Newport County.

mi	km	Destinations	Notes
0.0	0.0	Goat Island Road – Goat Island	Southern terminus
0.8	1.3	Route 138A north (Memorial Boulevard West)	Southern terminus of Route 138A
1.7	2.7	Route 138 (Newport Pell Bridge) – Portsmouth, Jamestown	Northern terminus
1.000 mi = 1.609 km; 1.000 km = 0.621 mi
