= Wakefield, Rhode Island =

Wakefield
- Village
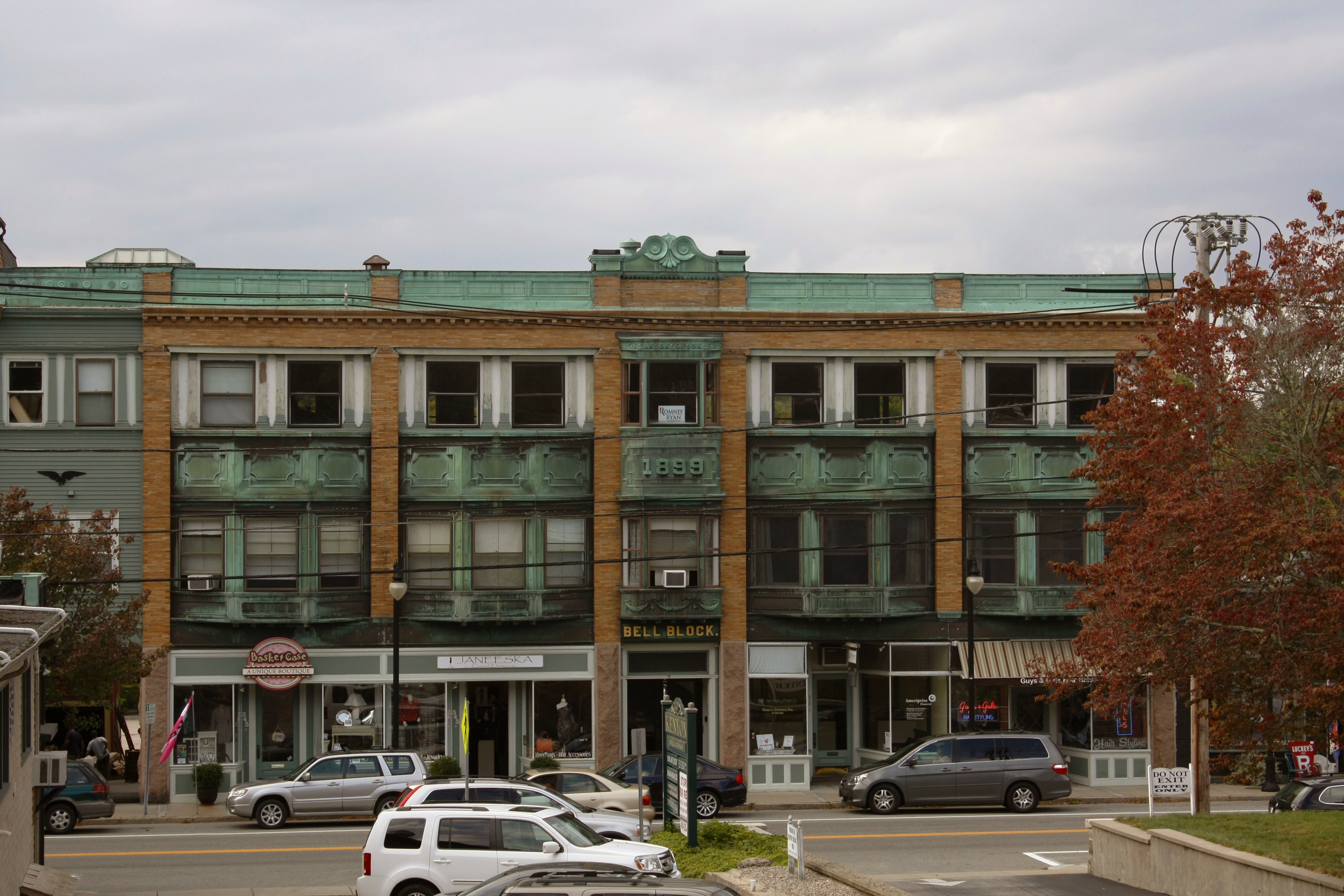
- Bell Block

- Location within Rhode Island Location within the United States
- Coordinates: 41°26′14″N 71°30′05″W
- Country: United States
- State: Rhode Island
- County: Washington
- Elevation: 7 ft (2.1 m)
- Time zone: UTC-5 (Eastern (EST))
  - Summer (DST): UTC-4 (EDT)
- ZIP code: 02880
- GNIS feature ID: 1219863

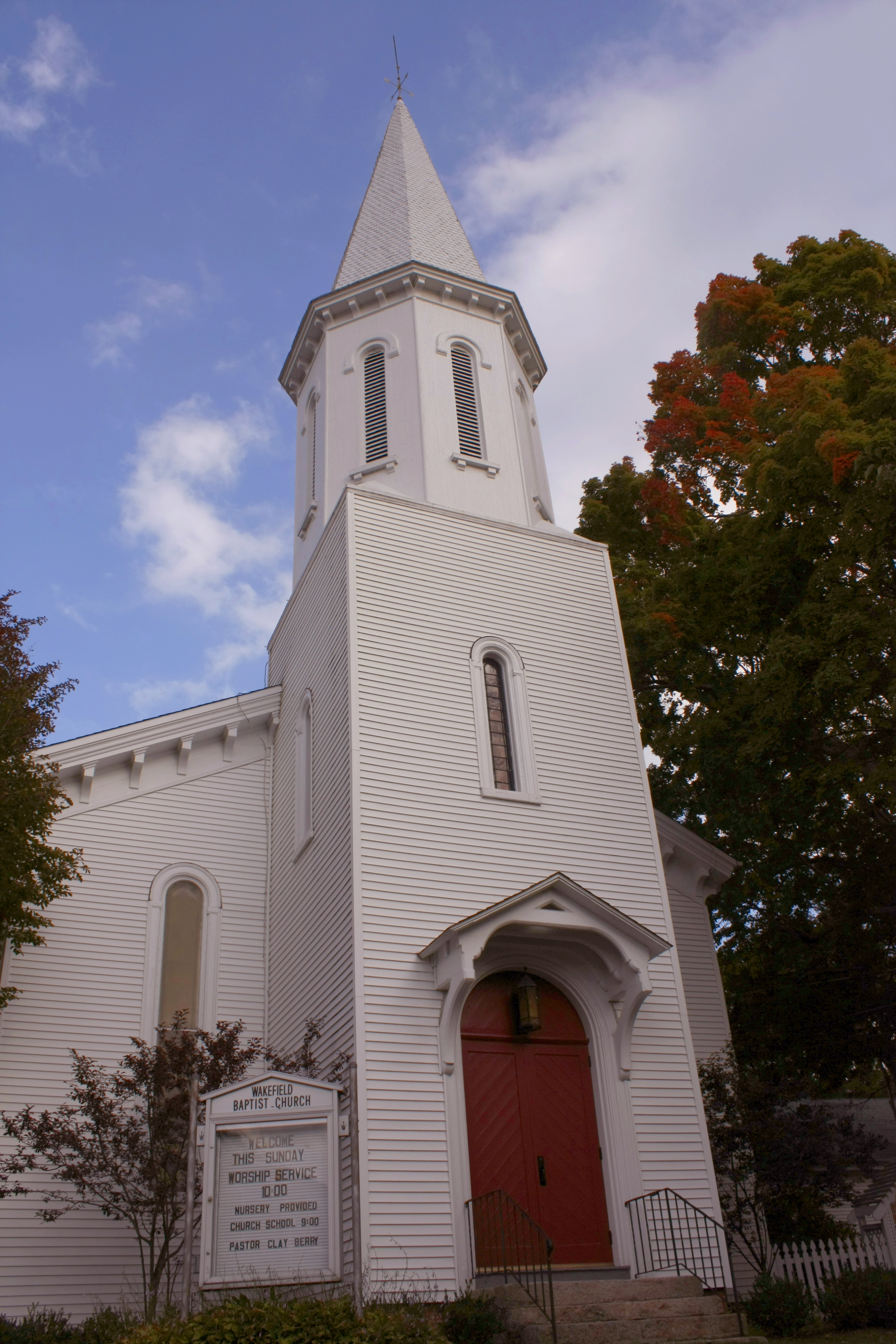
Wakefield Baptist Church

Wakefield is a village in the town of South Kingstown, Rhode Island, United States, and the commercial center of South Kingstown. Together with the village of Peace Dale, it is treated by the U.S. Census as a component of the census-designated place identified as Wakefield-Peacedale. West Kingston, another South Kingstown village, was the traditional county seat of Washington County. Since 1991, the Washington County Courthouse has been in Wakefield. The Sheriff's Office which handles corrections is also in Wakefield.

The Wakefield village center along Main Street (old Boston Post Road) between Belmont Avenue and Columbia Street was listed on the National Register of Historic Places in 1996 as Wakefield Historic District, with boundary increases in 2019 and 2022. The district is significant for being an early commercial and industrial center. The district includes 53 properties over an area of 400 acres (160 ha).

== History ==
Wakefield was a focus for settlement due to its location on the Saugatucket River and the old Post Road, which was laid out early in the 18th century. Settlement began in the early 18th century with establishment of a small mill on the Saugatucket River. A tavern and stagecoach stop were established in 1745 and a snuff mill was built around 1765. The textile industry began to become an important source of economic activity in 1807 when a carding mill was established on the Saugatucket River. By 1822, the village had about 60 residents and consisted of nine houses, a store, the carding mill, a grist mill, a saw mill, and a blacksmith shop. A Baptist church was built in 1830 and an Episcopal church followed in 1840.

The local textile mill continued to operate and expand through the 19th century, but in the mid-century, as nearby Peace Dale grew as a manufacturing center and factories were established in other water power sites in the area, Wakefield became the commercial center of South Kingstown. It underwent considerable growth in the 1840s, including the development of some major retail stores. A Roman Catholic priest was assigned to Wakefield in 1852 and the first Catholic church was built two years later. Kenyon's Department Store was founded in 1856. A carriage manufacturing operation was established in 1874, and in 1876 the Narragansett Pier Railroad started operation, with a station in Wakefield. It is now a bike trail called the William C. O'Neill Bike Path. In 1877, the South Kingstown Town Hall was built in the village. A bank and several other major businesses arrived in the 1880s. By 1895, Wakefield had a population of 1,543, and had begun to coalesce with the villages of Peace Dale and Rocky Brook, forming a roughly contiguous settlement with a total population of 3,285.

The Wakefield Mill underwent several ownership changes and expansions in the 20th century. In 1903, it was sold to the Wakefield Woolen Company, which installed new looms and carding equipment for producing high-grade woolen fabrics. It sold again in 1922 and four more times between World War II and 1984. Beginning in the 1950s, parts of the mill complex began to be converted to other uses, but as of 1984, much of the complex was still used for textile manufacturing.

Wakefield's first hospital was started in a house in 1919, and a new South County Hospital building was built in 1925 on a 6-acre (2.4 ha) tract that formerly had been the town farm.

Beginning in the late 1950s, commercial activity in Wakefield migrated away from the central business district to new commercial areas on the periphery of the community. As of 1984, the village was considered the largest shopping area in South County.

== Economy ==
Much of Wakefield's economy is driven by seasonal tourism, as the main central business district of South Kingstown runs from the Saugatucket River up to Old Tower Hill.

== Arts and culture ==
Buildings in Wakefield listed on the National Register of Historic Places include Wakefield Baptist Church, Nathaniel C. Armstrong House, John H. Armstrong House, Hera Gallery, and Bell Block.

== Education ==
Wakefield is part of the South Kingstown School District. Schools in Wakefield include South Kingstown High School, Broad Rock Middle School, Curtis Corner Middle School, and Wakefield Elementary School (which has been closed along with Curtis Corner Middle School).

== Media ==
The Narragansett Times, a twice-weekly paper serving Narragansett and South Kingstown, is published in Wakefield.

== Notable people ==
- Ron Locke, baseball player
- Bob Rathbun, play-by-play announcer for the Atlanta Hawks
