= National Register of Historic Places listings in Charlestown, Rhode Island =

This is a list of Registered Historic Places in Charlestown, Rhode Island.

Contents: Counties in Rhode Island

Bristol | Kent | Newport | Providence (Pawtucket | Providence (city) | Woonsocket) | Washington

This National Park Service list is complete through NPS recent listings posted April 24, 2026.

	Name on the Register	Image	Date listed	Location	City or town	Description
1	Babcock House	Babcock House	January 1, 1976 (#76000008)	Main St. 41°20′14″N 71°42′43″W	Charlestown	
2	Carolina Village Historic District	Carolina Village Historic District	May 2, 1974 (#74000009)	Charlestown; 41°27′31″N 71°39′51″W	Charlestown and Richmond	
3	District Schoolhouse No. 2	District Schoolhouse No. 2	January 4, 1980 (#80000016)	Old Post Rd. 41°23′07″N 71°39′04″W	Charlestown	
4	Foster Cove Archeological Site	Foster Cove Archeological Site	May 6, 1980 (#80000018)	Address Restricted	Charlestown	
5	Historic Village of the Narragansetts in Charlestown	Historic Village of the Narragansetts in Charlestown	May 7, 1973 (#73000008)	Bounded by Route 112, U.S. Route 1, King's Factory Road (Bureau of Indian Affairs Route 411), and Route 91; 41°24′37″N 71°40′03″W	Charlestown	
6	Indian Burial Ground	Indian Burial Ground	April 28, 1970 (#70000005)	Narrow Lane; 41°23′48″N 71°38′00″W	Charlestown	
7	Joseph Jeffrey House	Joseph Jeffrey House	March 8, 1978 (#78000017)	Old Mill Road; 41°25′47″N 71°39′54″W	Charlestown	
8	Shannock Historic District	Shannock Historic District	August 4, 1983 (#83000005)	Main St., N. Shannock and W. Shannock Rds. 41°26′53″N 71°38′28″W	Charlestown and Richmond	
9	Sheffield House	Sheffield House	January 1, 1976 (#76000011)	Beach Rd. 41°20′09″N 71°42′32″W	Charlestown	
10	Joseph Stanton House	Joseph Stanton House	January 11, 1980 (#80000026)	U.S. Route 1; 41°21′25″N 71°42′17″W	Charlestown	

== See also ==
- National Register of Historic Places listings in Washington County, Rhode Island
- List of National Historic Landmarks in Rhode Island
