= East Beach State Beach =

State beach in Charlestown, Rhode Island

East Beach
- Location within Rhode Island
- Interactive map of East Beach
- Location: Charlestown, Rhode Island, United States
- Coordinates: 41°20′42″N 71°40′56″W
- Area: 174 acres (70 ha)
- Elevation: 0 ft (0 m)
- Established: 1967
- Administrator: Rhode Island Department of Environmental Management, Division of Parks & Recreation
- Website: Official website
- Rhode Island State Parks

East Beach or East State Beach is a seaside public recreation area on Quonochontaug Neck, the narrow barrier island that separates Block Island Sound and Ninigret Pond, in the town of Charlestown, Rhode Island, United States. The state beach encompasses three miles (4.8 km) of oceanfront and abuts Ninigret National Wildlife Refuge.

== History ==
The recreational grounds were established as East Beach State Park in 1967. The area was listed at 174 acres (70 ha) in 2000. In 2006, the state began "setting up this natural reserve in a major way" with the addition of some 250 acres (100 ha) acquired through the purchase of four parcels at a cost of a little more than two million dollars.

== Activities and amenities ==
The area offers a 20-unit seasonal campground, salt-water fishing, ocean swimming, and beach activities. It is open seasonally.
