= Frosty Drew Observatory =

Observatory in Rhode Island, US

- Organization: Frosty Drew Memorial Fund, Inc.
- Location: Charlestown, Rhode Island, US
- Coordinates: 41°22′02″N 71°39′49″W
- Weather: See the Clear Sky Chart
- Established: 1988
- Website: Frosty Drew Observatory

Telescopes
- PlaneWave CDK600: 24" Corrected Dall-Kirkham
- Meade LX200: 16" Schmidt Cassegrain

Frosty Drew Observatory is an educational astronomical observatory owned and operated by the Frosty Drew Memorial Fund. It is located in the Ninigret National Wildlife Refuge in Charlestown, Rhode Island midway along the coast line between Westerly and Point Judith. It is named after Edwin "Frosty" Drew. The main instrument is a PlaneWave CDK600 24" Corrected Dall-Kirkham telescope which was installed in October, 2021. The current Director of the observatory and nature center is Scott MacNeill.
