= Fort Ninigret =

- U.S. National Register of Historic Places
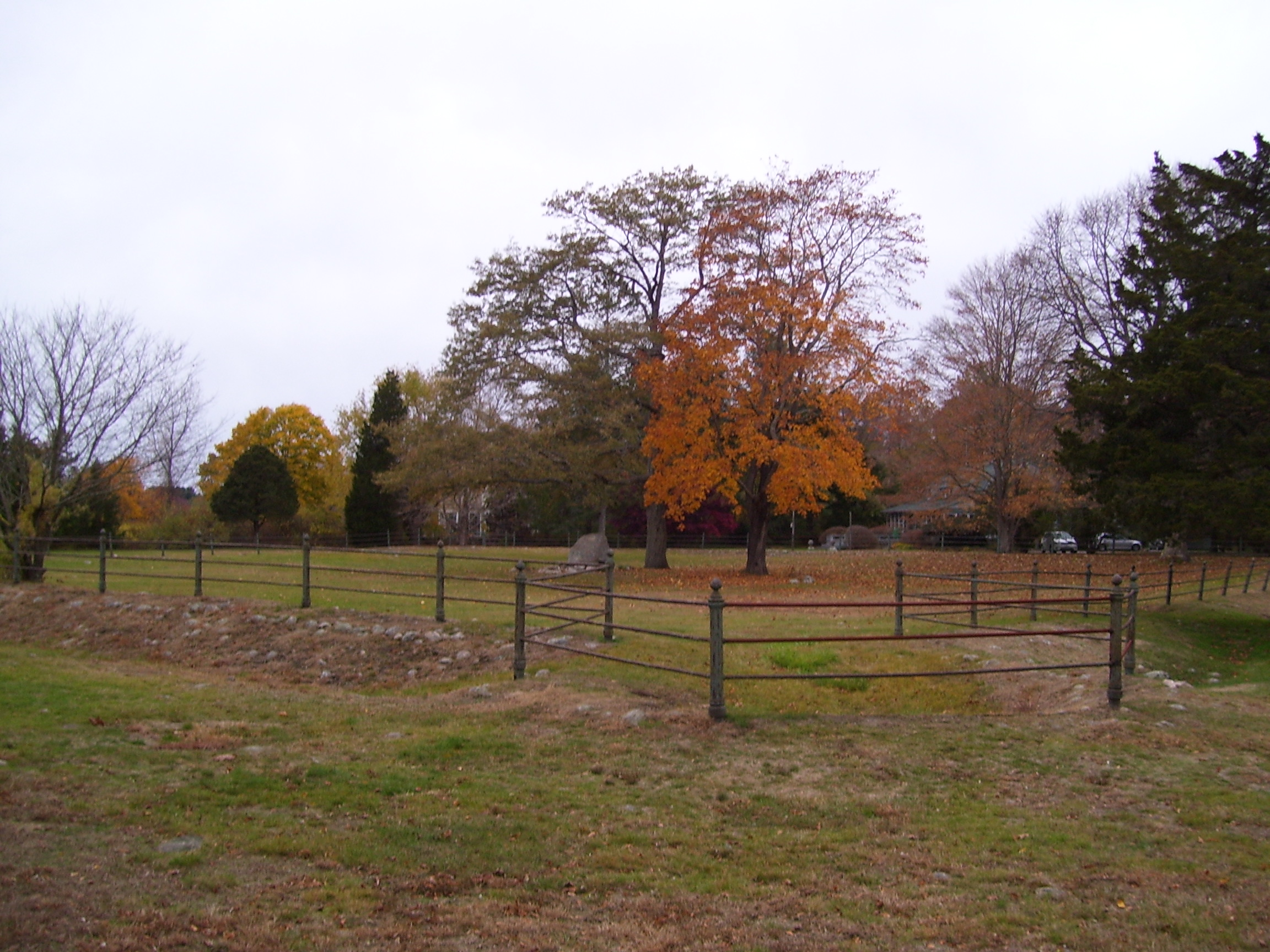
- Fort Ninigret in 2008

- Location within Rhode Island Location within the United States
- Location: Charlestown, Rhode Island
- Coordinates: 41°22′52″N 71°38′54″W
- Built: 1637
- Architect: Dutch West India Company
- NRHP reference No.: 70000004
- Added to NRHP: April 28, 1970

Fort Ninigret is a historic fort and trading post site at Fort Neck Road in Charlestown, Rhode Island, built and occupied by European settlers in the seventeenth century. At its 1883 dedication, Commissioner George Carmichael, Jr. referred to it as "the oldest military post on the Atlantic coast."

== History ==
Archaeological excavations have shown that people lived on Fort Neck long before the Europeans arrived, although this was never a large village. But around 1620, many Niantic people settled at this place (cousins and allies of the larger Narragansett tribe), growing corn, making wampum, and trading with the Dutch and English Colonists for such things as beads, pipes, and copper kettles. Ninigret, for whom the fort was named, was the sachem of the Niantics by the 1630s.

Most historians believe that the fort was built by the Dutch West India Company or by Portuguese explorers prior to 1637, in addition to the earlier trading post on nearby Dutch Island. One of the first printed references to Dutch forts in Rhode Island was Samuel Arnold's 1858 History of the State of Rhode Island.

In 1921−22, a European sword and cannon were found at an Indian cemetery near the site, along with many other goods which demonstrate that this was a European fort. The artifacts are now in the possession of the Rhode Island Historical Society.

King Philip's War (1675–76) cemented Colonial rule over most of the Indian lands of Rhode Island, but a reservation was set aside for the tribe encompassing much of today's Charlestown. Many Narragansetts had joined Ninigret's people for safety, and soon the name Niantic fell out of use. At Fort Ninigret, tribal members lived in wigwams into the 18th century. Nearby stood the European-style house of the sachems, who sold off tribal property to the Colonists to pay their debts. By the 19th century, Fort Neck was the last piece of land held in common by the Narragansett tribe which had access to salt water.

In 1883, the state abolished relations with the tribe, instead conferring upon its members the rights and duties of US citizenship. As part of this process, the state transformed the remains of Fort Ninigret into a monument to the 250 years of positive relations between the Narragansett Indians (and their modern descendants) with their non-Indian neighbors. The state reshaped the earthen banks of the fort, under the direction of the commissioners of the Narragansett Indian Tribe, planted evergreens, and erected an iron fence along the outlines of the old fort. A boulder was moved from the nearby hills and inscribed with these words:

Fort Ninigret
Memorial of the Narragansett and Niantic Indians
Unwavering Friends and Allies of Our Fathers
Erected by the State of Rhode Island
Dwight R. Adams, William P. Sheffield, Jr., George Carmichael, Jr.: Comrs
1883

Gideon L. Ammons and Joshua H. Noka spoke at the monument's dedication, both members of the Indian Council.

In 1983, the federal government acknowledged that the Narragansetts were still alive and well in Rhode Island, and they were once again recognized as a tribe. Today Fort Ninigret is maintained by the Rhode Island Department of Environmental Management and the Charlestown Historical Society.

Fort Ninigret was added to the National Register of Historic Places in 1970. Archaeological excavations were conducted there during the 1970s by the Rhode Island Historical Preservation Commission and by archaeologists from New York University.

== Images ==
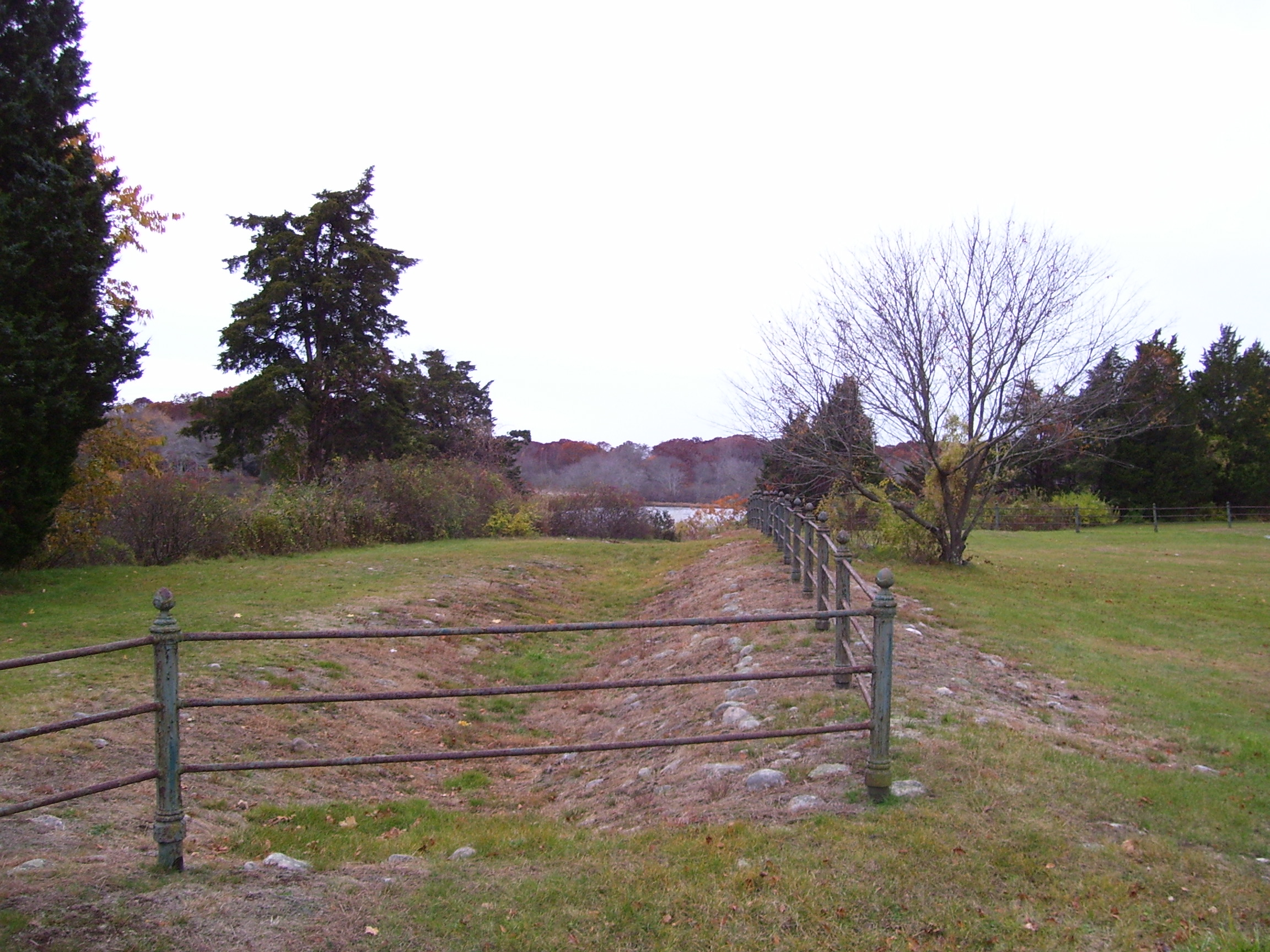
Fort Ninigret in 2008

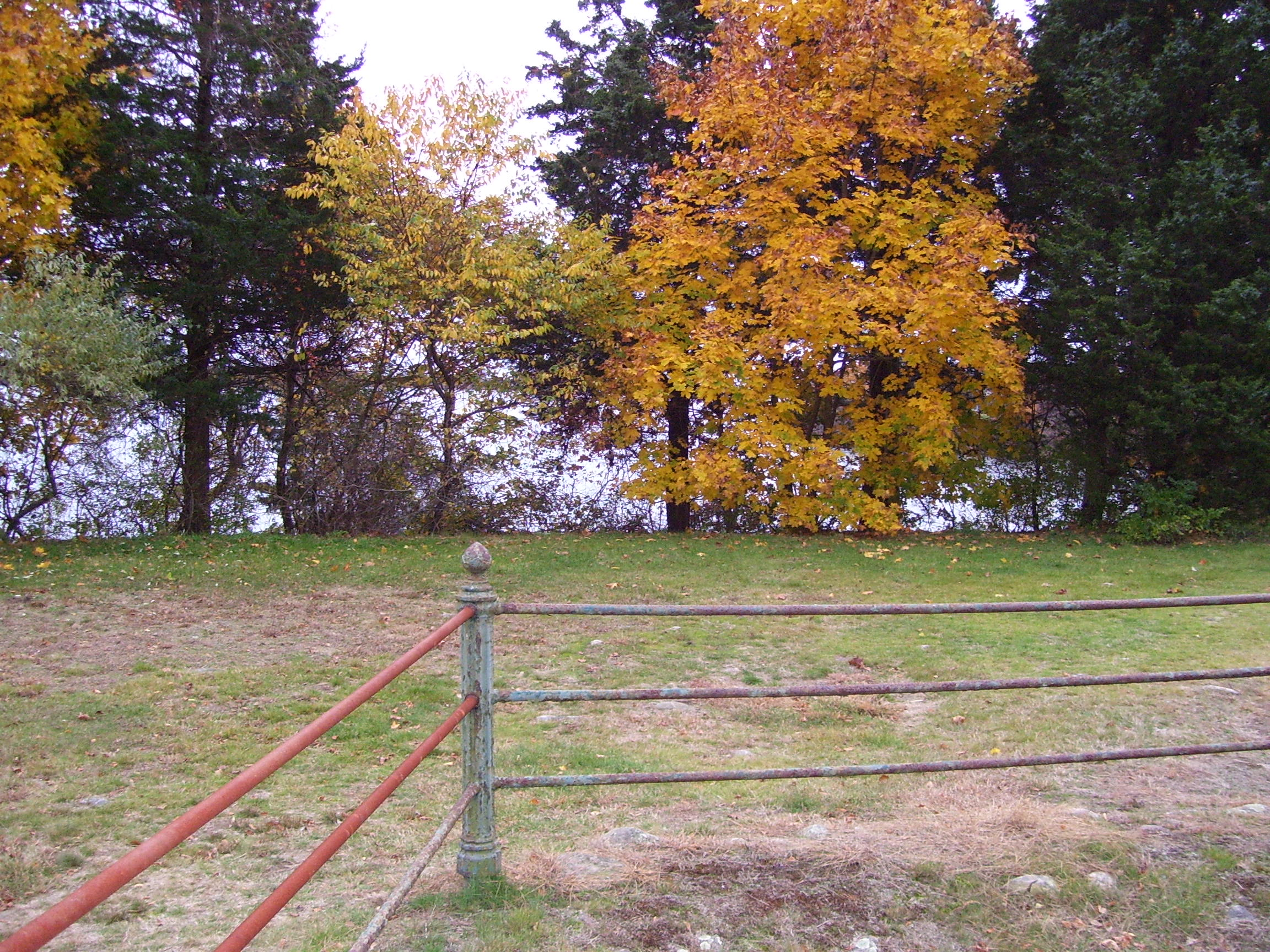
Fort Ninigret in 2008

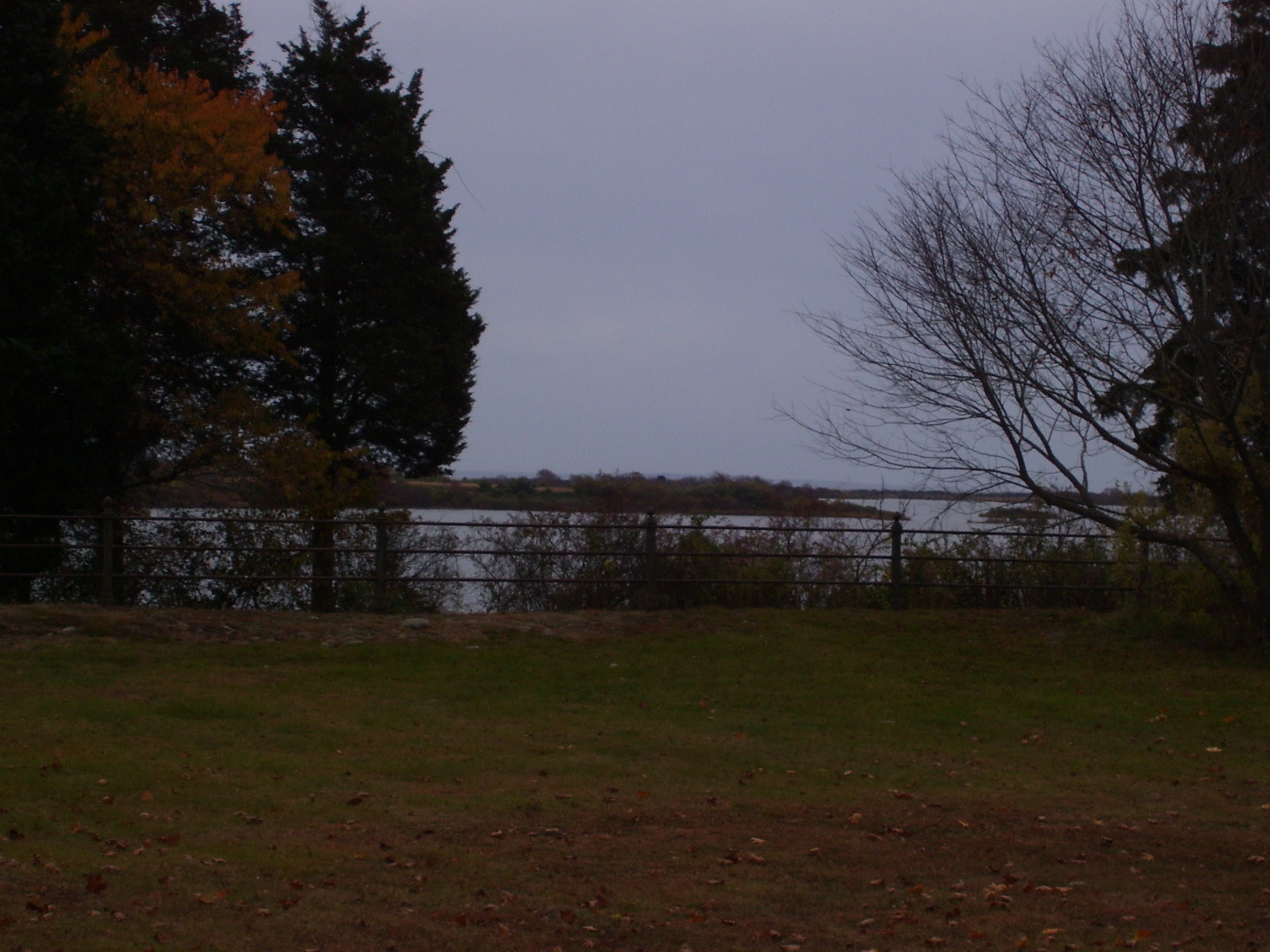
Fort Ninigret in 2008

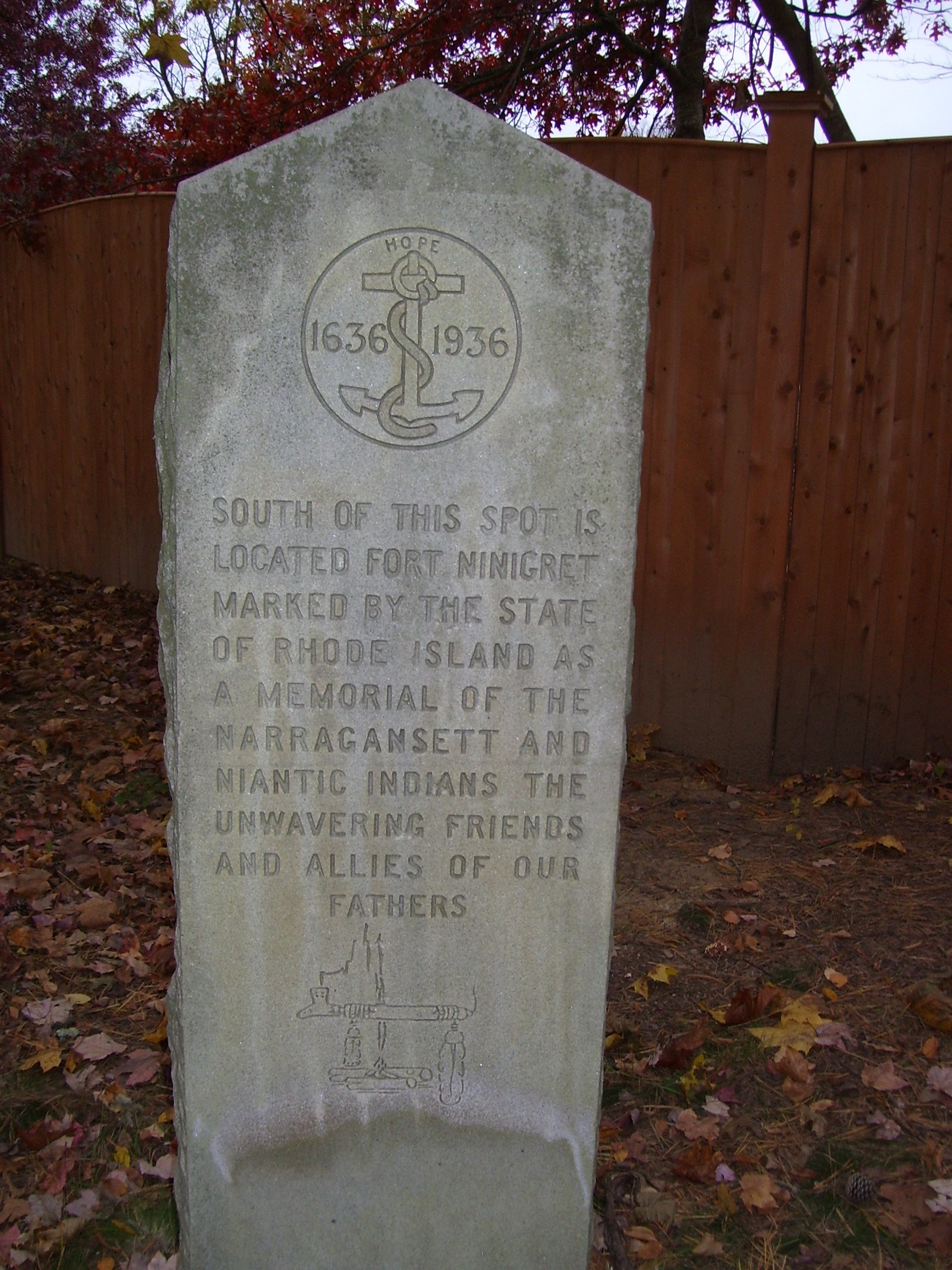
Fort Ninigret in 2008

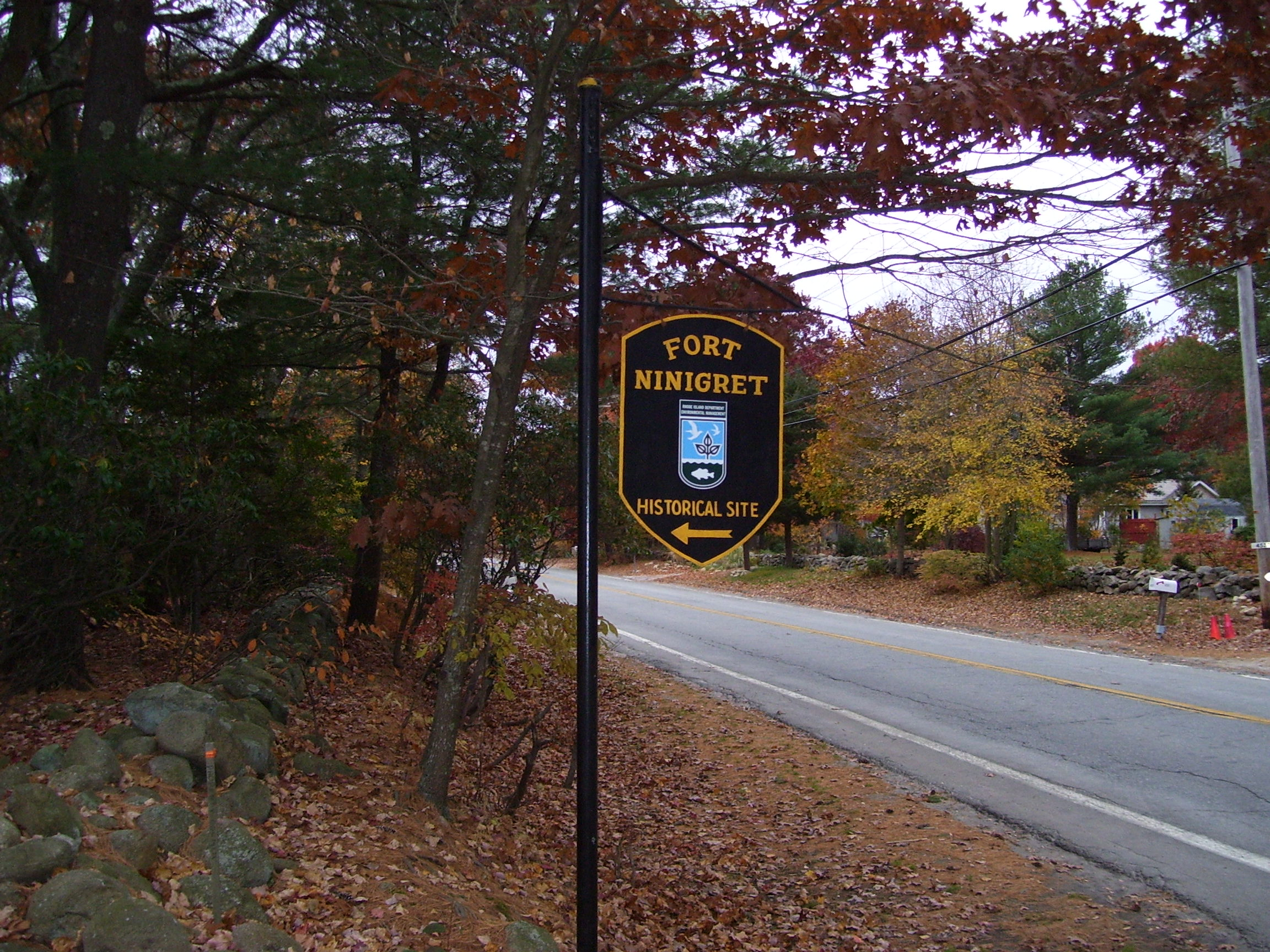
Fort Ninigret in 2008

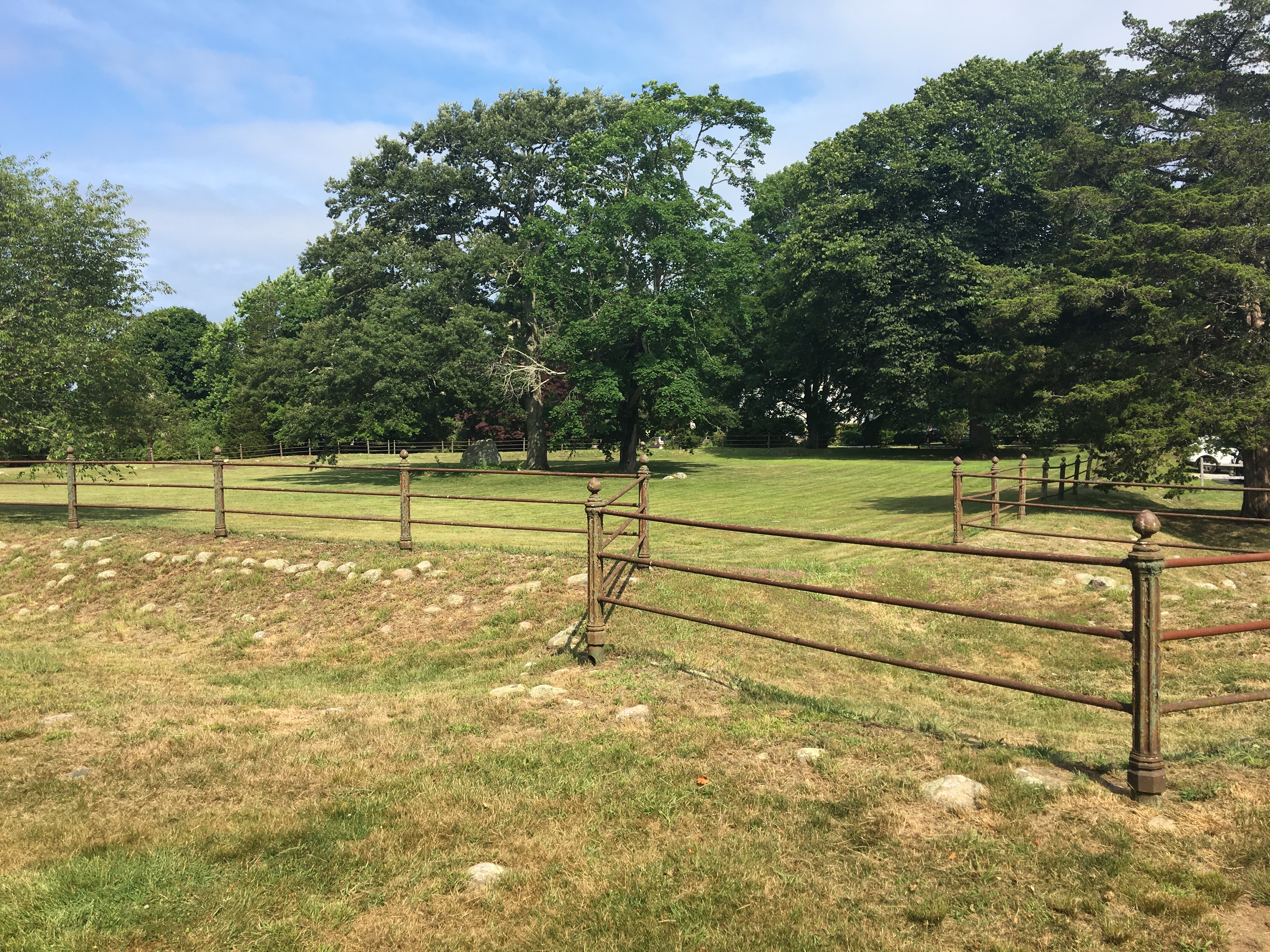
Fort Ninigret in 2018

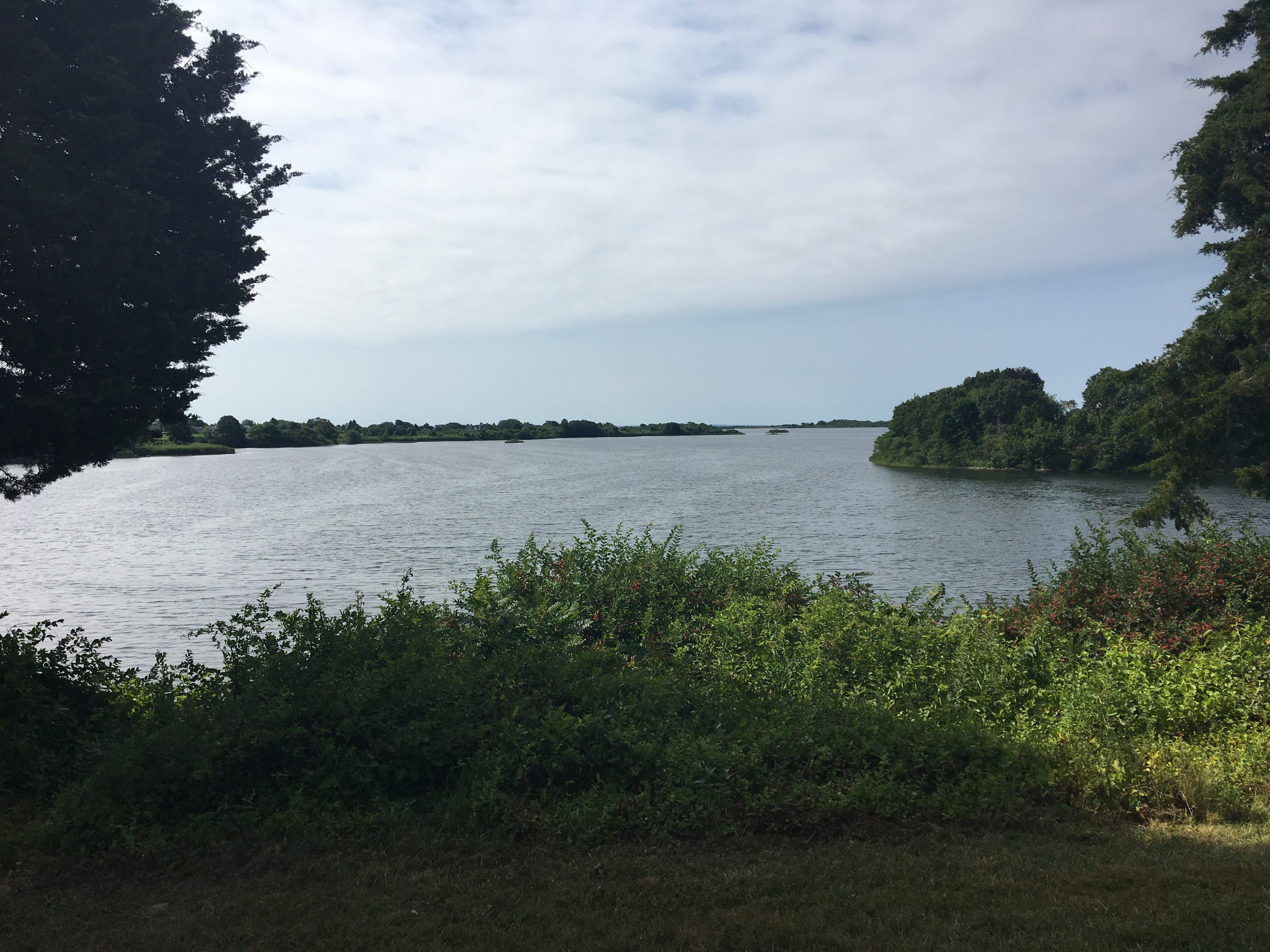
Tautog Cove in Ninigret Pond, from Fort Ninigret

== See also ==
- National Register of Historic Places listings in Washington County, Rhode Island
