= Foster Cove Archeological Site =

- U.S. National Register of Historic Places
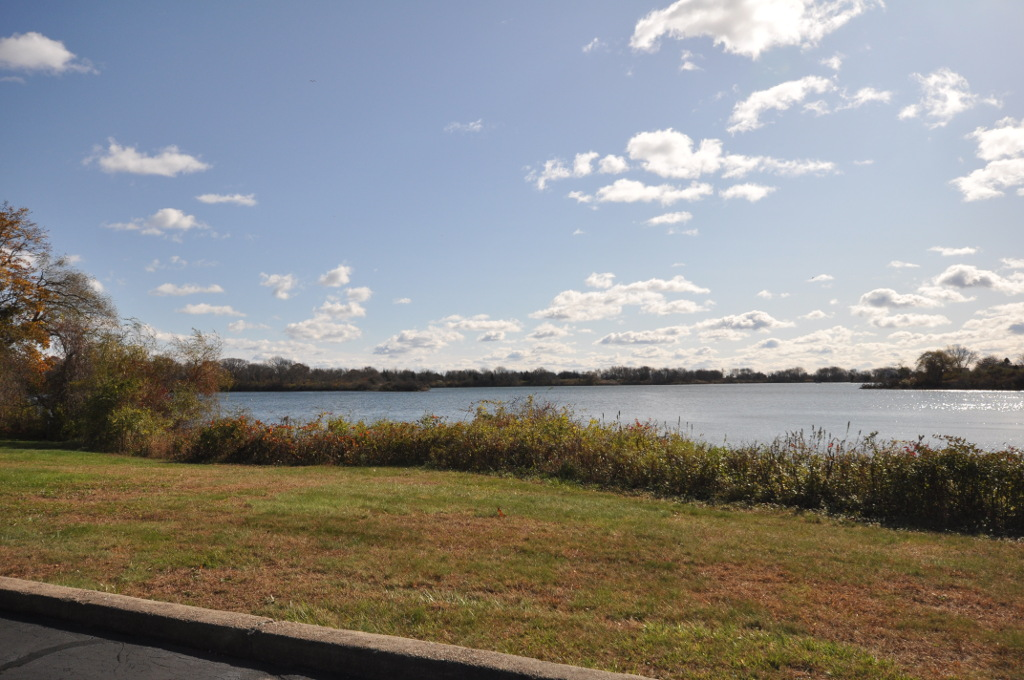
- Foster Cove
- Location: Charlestown, Rhode Island
- NRHP reference No.: 80000018
- Added to NRHP: May 6, 1980

Foster Cove Archeological Site, designated RI-CH-2 and later RI-16 in state surveys, is a prehistoric archaeological site in Charlestown, Rhode Island. Located within the Ninigret National Wildlife Refuge, it is a Native American habitation site dating to the Woodland Period. It was identified in 1974 during a survey of the former Naval Auxiliary Air Station Charlestown by state archaeologists, in which two trenches included finds from the site. Test pits were dug in 1979 by the state to determine the extent of the site.

The site was added to the National Register of Historic Places in 1980.

== See also ==
- National Register of Historic Places listings in Washington County, Rhode Island
