= Joseph Stanton Jr. =

American politician (1739–1821)

Member of the U.S. House of Representatives from Rhode Island's at-large district
- In office March 4, 1801 – March 3, 1807
- Preceded by: John Brown
- Succeeded by: Isaac Wilbour

United States Senator from Rhode Island
- In office June 12, 1790 – March 3, 1793
- Preceded by: (none)
- Succeeded by: William Bradford

Personal details
- Born: July 19, 1739 Charlestown, Rhode Island Colony, British America
- Died: December 15, 1821 (aged 82) Lebanon, Connecticut, U.S.
- Party: Anti-Administration; Democratic Republican

Military service
- Branch/service: Rhode Island Militia
- Years of service: 1759–1764; 1776–1777; 1779–1790
- Rank: Major general
- Battles/wars: French and Indian War; American Revolutionary War

Joseph Stanton Jr. (July 19, 1739 – December 15, 1821) was a military officer, a United States senator of the Anti-Federalist faction and a United States Representative of the Democratic-Republican party.

== Early life ==
Stanton was born in Charlestown in the Colony of Rhode Island and Providence Plantations in 1739. During the French and Indian War he served in the expedition against Quebec 1759. In June 1762 he was elected captain of the Artillery Company of Westerly, Charlestown and Hopkinton, an independent company of the Rhode Island Militia which still exists as the 169th Military Police Company. He represented Charlestown in the Rhode Island General Assembly from 1768 to 1774 and again in 1776.

== Military service ==
During the American Revolutionary War, Stanton was commissioned as the lieutenant colonel of the 1st Kings County Regiment of the Rhode Island Militia in July 1776. He then served as the colonel of a regiment of state troops, raised for 15 months service, from December 12, 1776, until his resignation on November 10, 1777. (The regiment was part of a brigade of two infantry and one artillery regiments which was formed to deter an invasion of the mainland portion of Rhode Island by the British forces occupying Newport.)

In May 1779 he was appointed at the colonel of the 1st Kings County Regiment of the militia and was subsequently appointed a brigadier general in command of the Kings County Brigade of militia in October of the same year. In May 1788 he was promoted to major general in command of the entire Rhode Island Militia. He held this position until his resignation in October 1790.

== Political career ==
He was a delegate to the Rhode Island Constitutional Convention in 1790, which ratified the United States Constitution and enabled Rhode Island to be the last of the 13 colonies to join the Union.

He was elected by the General Assembly to serve as one of the first two U.S. Senators from Rhode Island, and served from June 12, 1790, to March 3, 1793, as a member of the Anti-Administration Party (i.e. opposed to President George Washington). He then served as a representative in the Rhode Island General Assembly from 1794 to 1800. He was then elected to the United States House of Representatives, where he served from March 4, 1801 to March 3, 1807, as a member of the Jeffersonian Democrat-Republican Party.

Stanton died in Lebanon, Connecticut, in 1821 at the age of 82, and was buried in the Stanton family cemetery in Charlestown.

== Legacy ==
There is a monument to Senator Stanton on US Route 1 in Charlestown, Rhode Island, in front of his birthplace, which is listed on the National Register of Historic Places. The General Stanton Inn, a restaurant in Charlestown, is named after him.

U.S. Senate
Preceded by None	U.S. senator (Class 2) from Rhode Island; 1790–1793; Served alongside: Theodore Foster	Succeeded by William Bradford
U.S. House of Representatives
Preceded by John Brown	Member of the U.S. House of Representatives from Rhode Island's at-large district 1801—1807	Succeeded by Isaac Wilbour
