= Charlestown Breachway State Beach =

State beach in Rhode Island, US

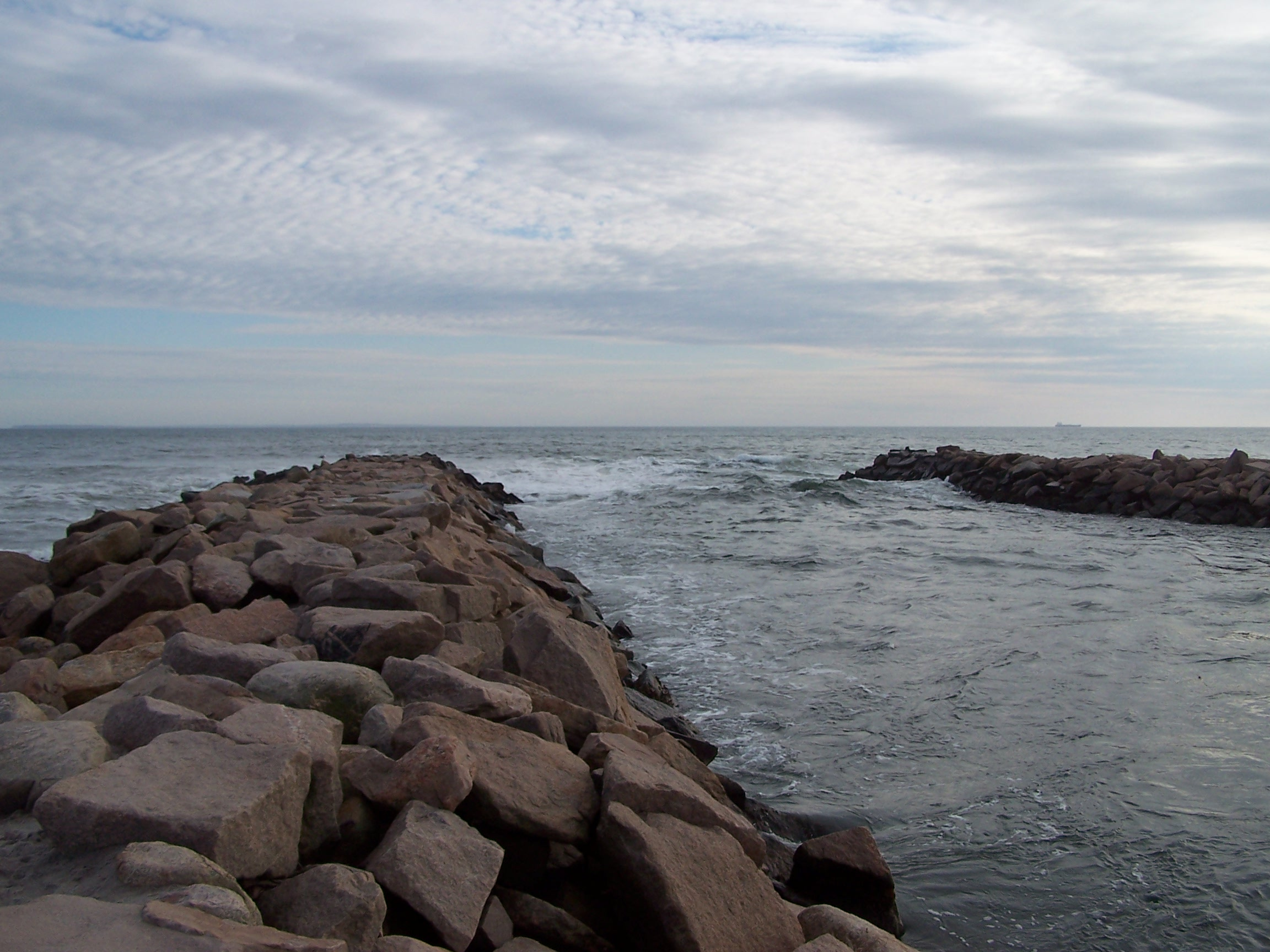
- Charlestown Breachway

- Location within Rhode Island
- Interactive map of Charlestown Breachway State Beach
- Location: Charlestown, Rhode Island, United States
- Coordinates: 41°21′24″N 71°38′21″W
- Area: 79 acres (32 ha)
- Elevation: 0 ft (0 m)
- Established: 1952
- Administrator: Rhode Island Department of Environmental Management, Division of Parks & Recreation
- Website: Official website
- Rhode Island State Parks

Charlestown Breachway State Beach is a seaside public recreation area on Block Island Sound in the town of Charlestown, Rhode Island. It is located on the east side of the manmade channel (the "Breachway") that connects Ninigret Pond with the Atlantic Ocean.

== History ==
The first attempt to create a breachway from Pawaget/Ninigret/Charlestown Pond to the ocean in 1897 ended in failure although $1000 had been awarded to the cause.

In 1904, the General Assembly appropriated $5000 for construction of a permanent breachway that would help the pond from becoming brackish and unsuitable for cultivating oysters. Colonel Rodman of the Rhode Island Engineers Office surveyed the site and proposed building jetties on either side of the breachway. The contract was awarded to John Bristow of South Kingstown, who had built the breakwater at Point Judith. Stone for the east jetty was carried to the site by a horse-drawn narrow-gauge railroad.

In 1951, the Rhode Island Division of Harbors and Rivers awarded a contract to rebuild the east wall and construct the west wall to a Westerly company, Gencarelli Inc. After four months of work in severe weather, the Charleston Beachway Beach was officially opened on April 7, 1952.

On October 17, 2024, Charlestown and the Rhode Island Department of Environmental Management announced emergency repairs to the west wall of the breachway, while boaters had been advised to use caution during travel through the breachway as the walls had worn down by many winter storms in 2023.

== Activities and amenities ==
The area offers 75 camping sites for self-contained RVs, ocean swimming, beach activities, salt-water fishing, and a boat launch. It is open seasonally.

== Gallery ==
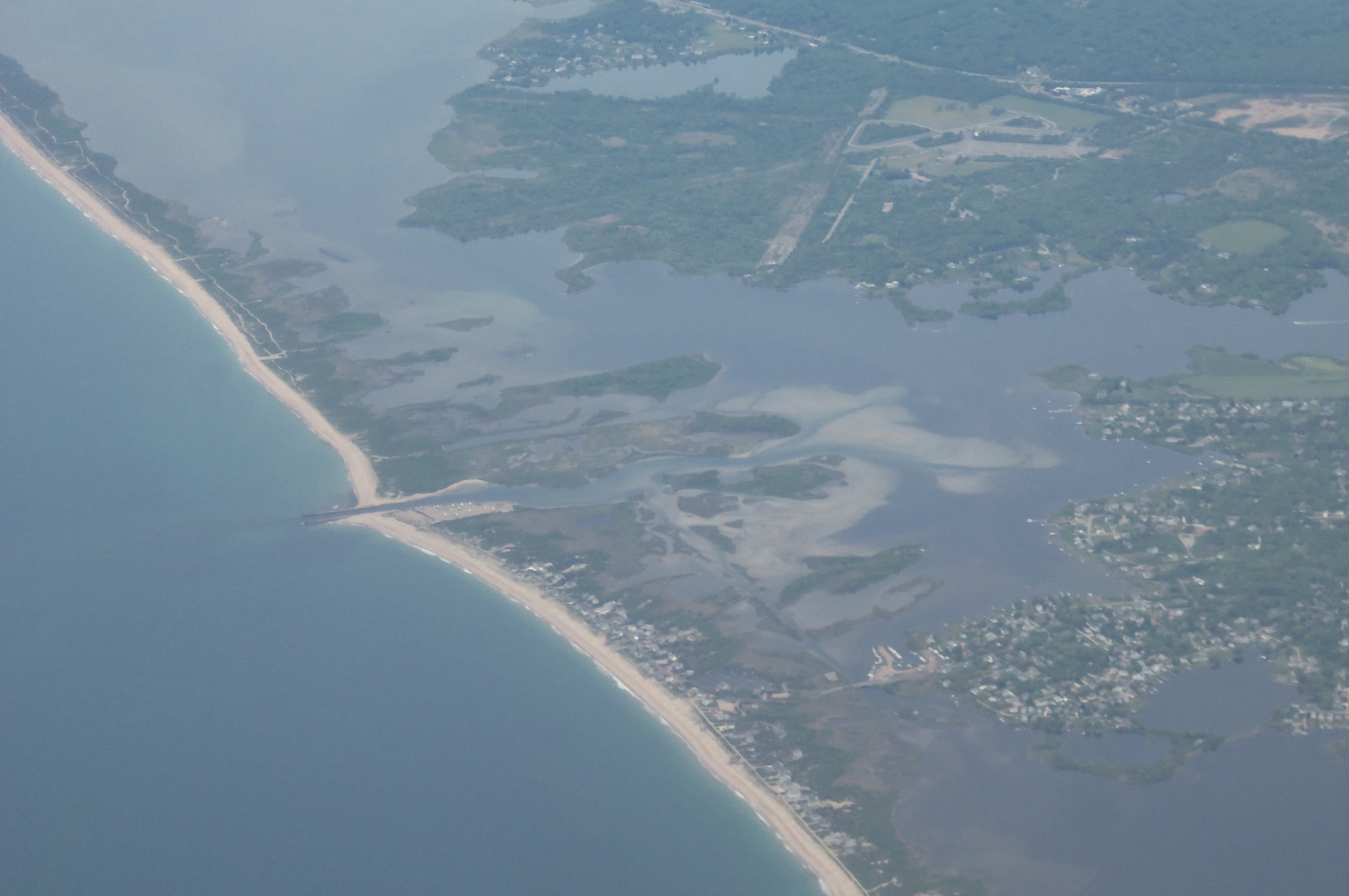

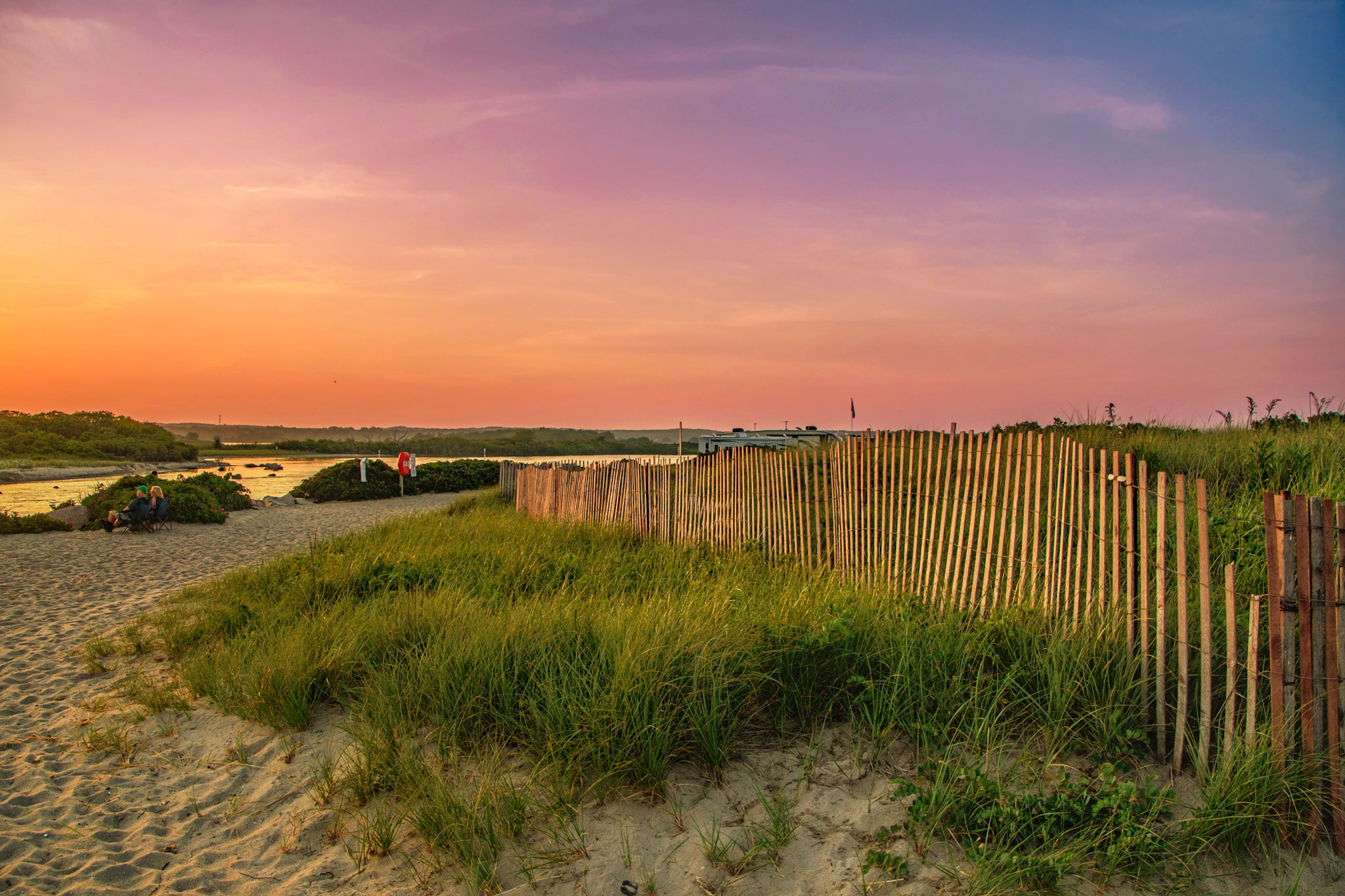
