= Quonochontaug Pond =

Coastal lagoon in Rhode Island, US

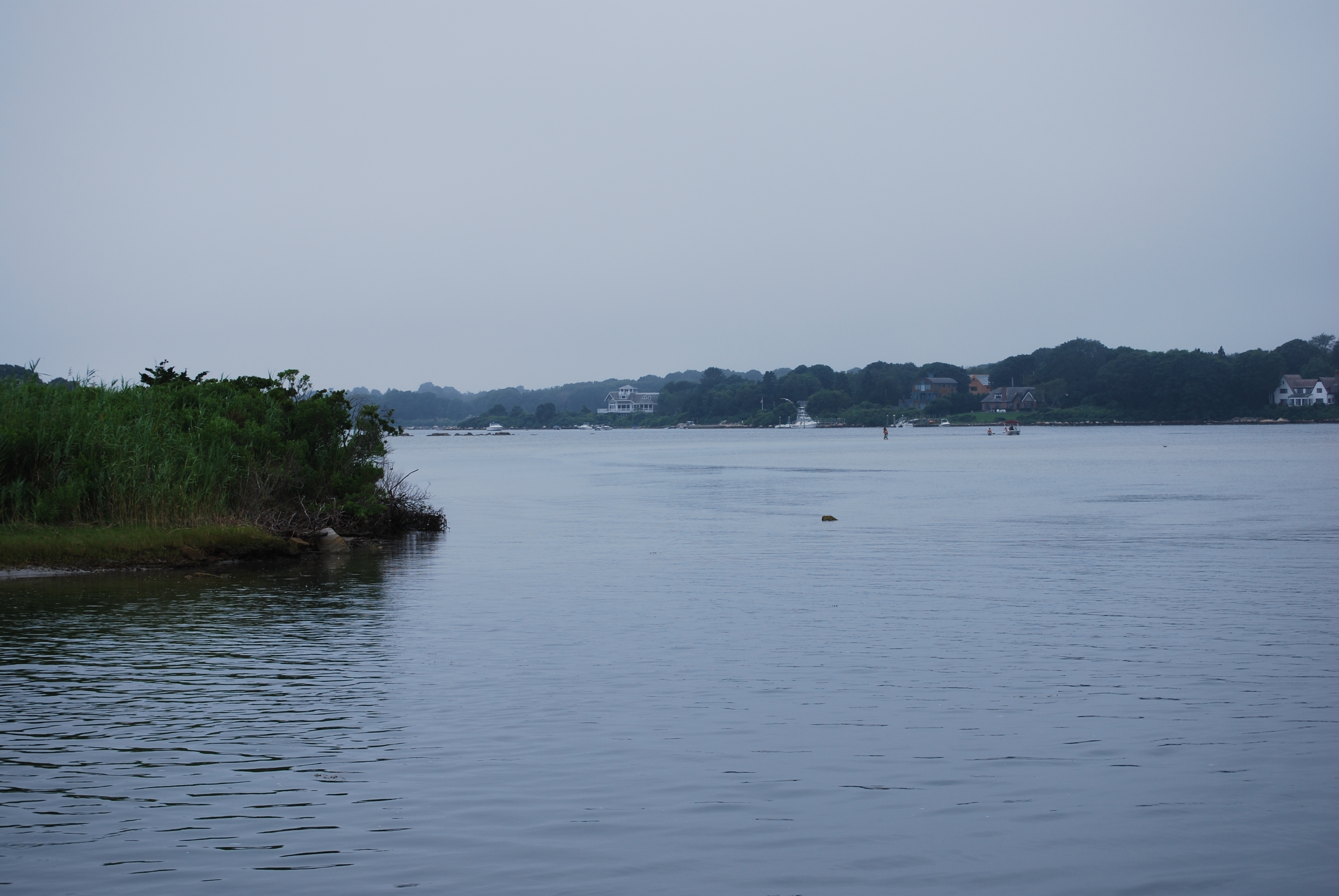
- Quonochontaug Pond in August 2009

- Location within Rhode Island
- Location: Washington County, Rhode Island
- Coordinates: 41°20′30″N 71°43′18″W
- Type: lagoon

Quonochontaug (KWAHN-uh-kon-tog) is a coastal lagoon in the towns of Charlestown and Westerly, both in Washington County, Rhode Island, United States. It is the most saline of nine such lagoons (often referred to as "salt ponds") in southern Rhode Island.

== Geography ==
Quonochontaug Pond is the deepest and most saline of the salt ponds. It is connected directly to the sea by a breachway that was stabilized with rock jetties by the US Army Corps of Engineers in the 1950s. And, as in the other ponds, sand eroding from the ocean side of the barrier beach is transported through the breachway into the pond where it settles and creates expanding shoals. In contrast to the other ponds, however, much of its western barrier beach remains in a protected, undeveloped state even though it is privately owned.

The town boundary between Westerly and Charlestown cuts through the middle of the pond. Water quality in past years has been very good because the pond is relatively deep, well flushed by the tides, and development has been limited. It is the least intensely developed of the ponds. Most of the development is residential, and much of it is occupied only seasonally. Like all the ponds, Quonochontaug is an important nursery for winter flounder, young striped bass, blue fish, and tautog. Bay scallops fluctuate in abundance from year to year, but in a good year, they are often found in this salt pond.

In the past few years, development pressures have increased dramatically, even though the watershed area is relatively small and a large portion of it is wet, red maple swamps. Much of the available remaining land is being subdivided into building lots.

Often referred to by locals as "Quonnie Pond", or "Quonnie", the lagoon is bounded on the south by coastal beaches, with a narrow breach way, created by the Army Corps of Engineers in the 1950s, providing access to Block Island Sound, and the Atlantic Ocean. The westernmost side of Quonnie is the site of the Weekapaug Inn, whose restaurants overlook the lagoon.

== See also ==
- Quonochontaug, Rhode Island

== Bibliography ==
This text is from Salt Pond Watchers Summary Data Report 1985 – 1987, Coastal Resources Center, University of Rhode Island Technical Report No. 10, October 1990, by P. Kullberg, V. Lee, and M. Platt.
