= Rhode Island Route 216 =

State highway in Rhode Island, US

Route 216
- Route 216 highlighted in red

Route information
- Maintained by RIDOT
- Length: 8.1 mi (13.0 km)

Major junctions
- South end: US 1 in Charlestown
- Route 91 from Bradford to Hopkinton
- North end: Route 216 at the Connecticut state line in Ashaway

Location
- Country: United States
- State: Rhode Island

Highway system
- Rhode Island Routes
← Route 214	→ Route 238

Route 216 is a numbered state highway running 8.1 miles (13.0 km) in Rhode Island. It runs from U.S. Route 1 (US 1) in Charlestown north to the Connecticut state line, where it continues as Connecticut Route 216.

== Route description ==
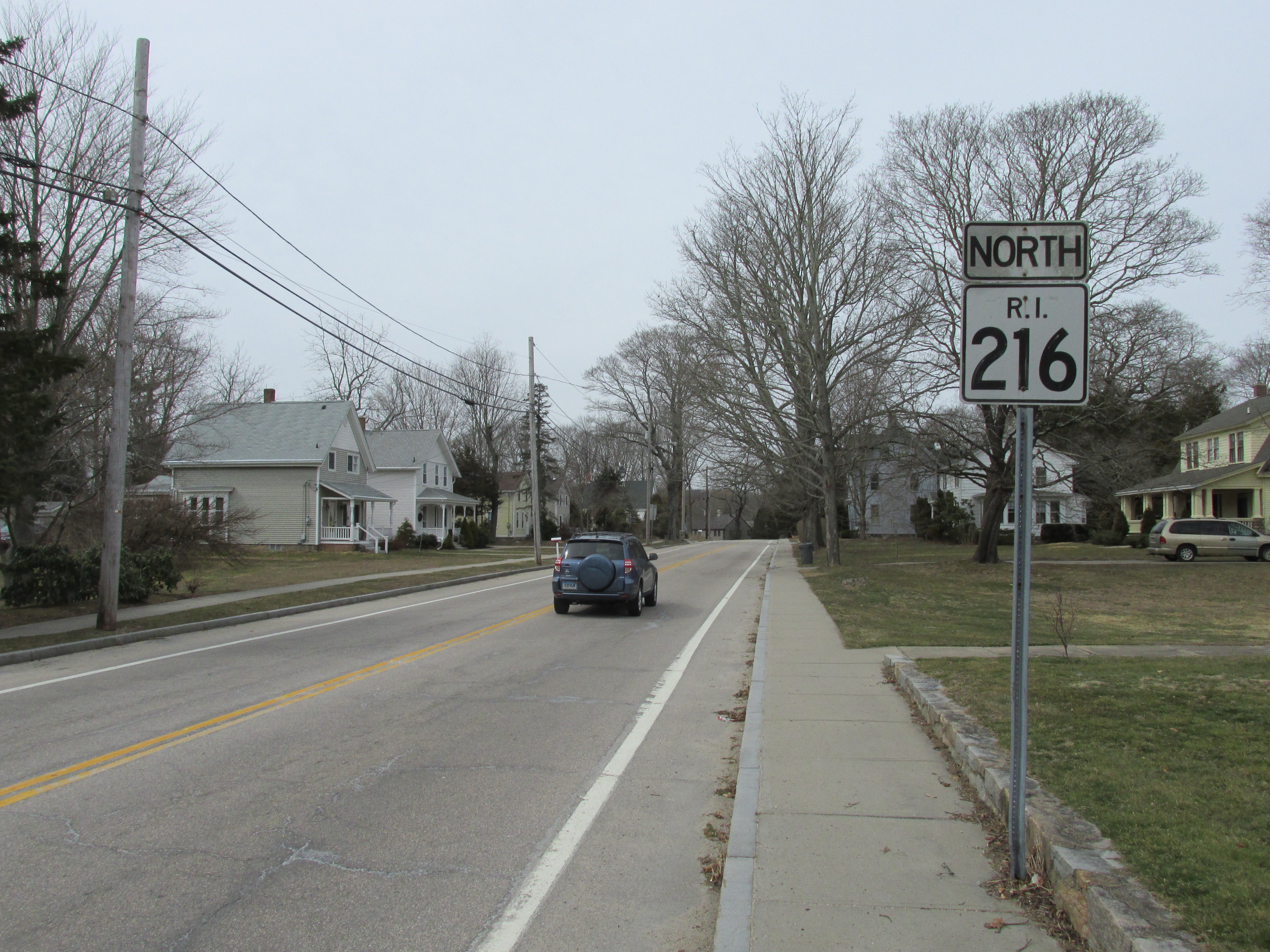
Route 216 northbound in Ashaway

Route 216 starts at an intersection with U.S. Route 1 (US 1) on the northern side of Quonochontaug Pond near Charlestown. From this intersection, Route 216 runs northward along Ross Hill Road through wooded terrain past the Shelter Harbor Golf Club. The highway crosses the Perry Healy Brook before Route 216 enters Westerly and follows Church Street northerly and northwesterly. In Bradford, Route 216 meets Route 91 (Bradford Road) and turns northward to run concurrently with Route 91 along and over the Pawcatuck River. On the north side of the river, the highway follows Alton–Bradford Road to the intersection with Ashaway Road. There, Route 216 turns westward and separates from Route 91 in Hopkinton. The highway runs through residential neighborhoods adjacent to the river until the intersection with Chase Hill Road where Route 216 turns northwesterly again.

In the community of Ashaway, Route 216 jogs southwesterly along Main Street for a block before turning back northwesterly along High Street. The highway meanders through the community and crosses the Ashaway River on High Street. At the Connecticut state line, the highway ends and becomes Connecticut Route 216.

== Major intersections ==
The entire route is in Washington County.

Location	mi	km	Destinations	Notes
Charlestown	0.0	0.0	US 1 (Post Road)	Southern terminus
Bradford	3.8	6.1	Route 91 south (Bradford Road)	Southern end of Route 91 concurrency
Hopkinton	4.7	7.6	Route 91 north (Alton Bradford Road)	Northern end of Route 91 concurrency
Ashaway	7.0	11.3	Route 3 north (Nooseneck Hill Road)	Southern end of Route 3 concurrency
Ashaway	7.1	11.4	Route 3 south (Nooseneck Hill Road)	Northern end of Route 3 concurrency
Ashaway	8.2	13.2	Route 216 west – North Stonington	Continuation into Connecticut
1.000 mi = 1.609 km; 1.000 km = 0.621 mi: Concurrency terminus
