= Indigenous peoples of Rhode Island =

The Indigenous peoples of Rhode Island are the tribes who historically and currently live in the land that is now the State of Rhode Island in the United States of America. These tribes belong to the Northeastern Woodlands, an Indigenous cultural region. The principal tribes at the time of European colonization were the Narragansett, Niantic, Nipmuc, Pequot, and Wampanoag tribes.

== History ==
=== Precontact ===
The earliest human inhabitants of what is now Rhode Island were Paleo-Indians who arrived in the region 10,000 years ago following the recession of the Wisconsin glaciation.

== 17th century ==
In 1636, when Roger Williams fled the Massachusetts Bay Colony, he initially befriended Canonicus, the Sachem of the Narragansett tribe. The Narragansett were the most powerful tribe in the region, which was briefly respected by the English colonizers who followed Roger Williams to the newly founded Colony of Rhode Island and Providence Plantations. A deed signed between Roger Williams, Canonicus, and Miantonomi granted the settlers land in what is now Providence in exchange for Narragansett access to English trading goods. Good relations between the settlers and the Narragansett quickly deteriorated due to speculators and investors among the settlers who wanted access to more Narragansett land. In 1658 and 1659, two groups of settlers purchased Atherton and Pettaquamscutt from the Narragansett tribe, land which became part of the town of Narragansett.

By the 1670s, increasing English encroachment on Wampanoag land by the Plymouth Colony lead to the King Philip's War (1675–1678). The Narragansett in Rhode Island eventually joined forces with the Wampanoags to fight against the settlers, but the Indigenous forces were defeated. During the course of the war, thousands of Native people and over six hundred white settlers were killed, the majority of Providence was burned, and some Native people were enslaved and sent to the Caribbean.

== 18th and 19th centuries ==
Between 1709 and 1880, the Historic Village of the Narragansetts in Charlestown was the reservation of the Narragansett tribe. In 1880, an initial tribal list of 302 Narragansett people was taken. In 1881, the list was expanded to 324 people. These 324 people, certified by the Rhode Island Supreme Court, constitute the people listed on what are known as the Detribalization Rolls, which serve as the base roll of the Narragansett Indian Tribe.

== 20th century ==
As of 2023, Native Americans were 1.2% of Rhode Island's population.

Some Native Americans in Rhode Island are Black Indians. Due to intermarriage between Black and Narragansett people, many citizens of the Narragansett Indian Tribe have African ancestry. Others intermarried with whites or have a mix of white, Black, and American Indian ancestry.

== Tribal legal recognition ==
=== Federal recognition ===
There is one federally recognized tribe within Rhode Island, the Narragansett Indian Tribe.

Section 106 of the National Historic Preservation Act of 1966 requires the State of Rhode Island to consult with federally recognized Native American tribes on all projects that could affect historic tribal lands or other properties with cultural or religious significance to Native tribes.

Federally recognized tribes with historic ties to Rhode Island are:

- Mashantucket Pequot Tribe
- Mashpee Wampanoag Tribe
- Mohegan Tribe

=== State recognition ===
There are no state-recognized tribes in Rhode Island, nor is their an official process for establishing state recognition.

== See also ==
- Indigenous peoples of Massachusetts
- Indigenous peoples of New York (state)

== Notable people ==
- Canonicus, Sachem of the Narragansett
- Ella Sekatau (Narragansett), poet, historian, and medicine woman
