= Babcock House (Charlestown, Rhode Island) =

Historic house in Rhode Island, United States

- U.S. National Register of Historic Places
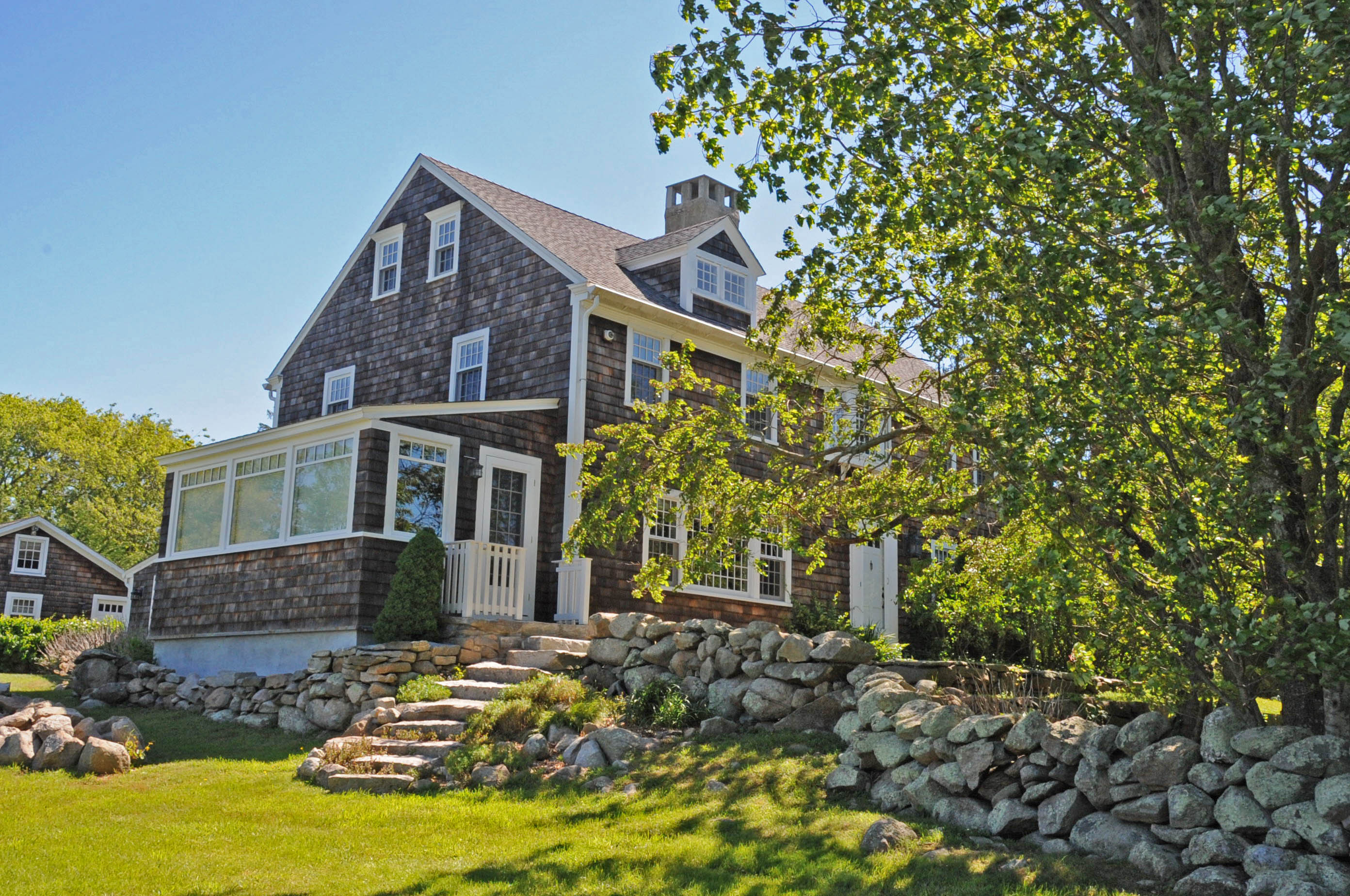

- Location within Rhode Island Location within the United States
- Interactive map showing the location for Babcock House
- Location: Charlestown, Rhode Island
- Coordinates: 41°20′14″N 71°42′43″W
- Area: 5 acres (2.0 ha)
- NRHP reference No.: 76000008
- Added to NRHP: January 1, 1976

The Babcock House is a historic house also known as Whistling Chimneys, located on Main Street in the Quonochontaug section of Charlestown, Rhode Island.

== History ==
The oldest portion of this 1 1/2-story wood-frame house is estimated to have been built sometime in the first two decades of the 18th century. It is similar to the Sheffield House, whose construction dates to 1685–1713. This house is believed to have been built by a member of the Stanton family, who also built the Sheffield House, possibly as a trading post. The house has an asymmetrical facade, the result of numerous alterations, but the original main block of the house has a massive central chimney, with two rooms on the right and one large chamber on the left. Additions in the 20th century have added rooms to the rear of the house, retaining the fabric of the main portion, and raising the roof to a full two stories.

The house was listed on the National Register of Historic Places in 1976.

== See also ==
- National Register of Historic Places listings in Washington County, Rhode Island
