= District Schoolhouse No. 2 =

- U.S. National Register of Historic Places
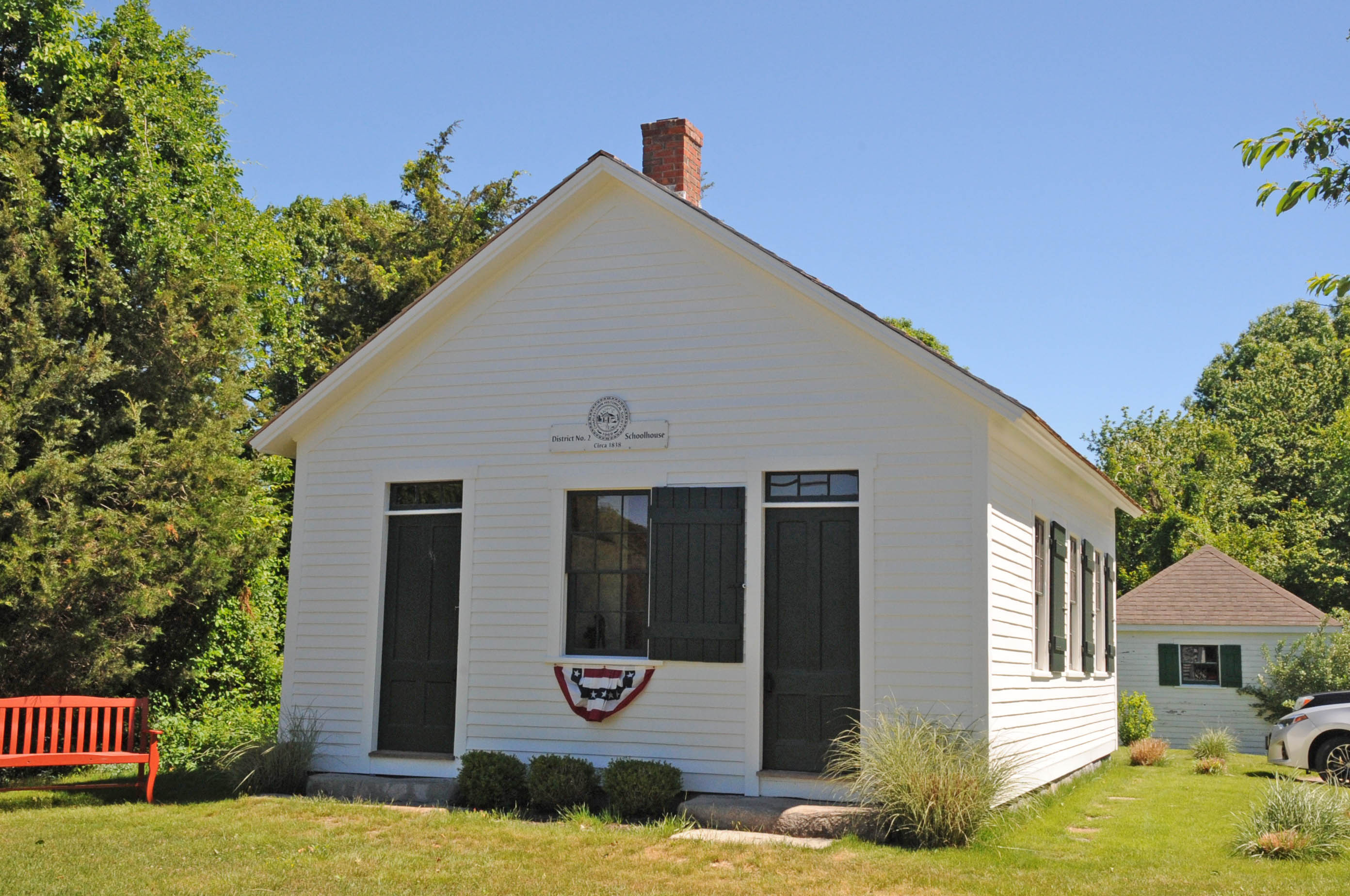

- Location within Rhode Island Location within the United States
- Location: Charlestown, Rhode Island
- Coordinates: 41°23′7″N 71°39′4″W
- Built: 1838
- NRHP reference No.: 80000016
- Added to NRHP: January 4, 1980

The District Schoolhouse No. 2 is a historic school building on Old Post Road (Rhode Island Route 1A) in the Cross Mills section of Charlestown, Rhode Island. The single-story Greek Revival structure was built c. 1838, and originally stood in the Quonochontaug area, before being moved to its present location (along with its foundation stones) in 1973. The schoolhouse is the best-preserved of Charlestown's eight 19th-century schoolhouses, and is now maintained by the Charlestown Historical Society.

The building was listed on the National Register of Historic Places in 1980.

== See also ==
- National Register of Historic Places listings in Washington County, Rhode Island
