= Naval Auxiliary Air Station Charlestown =

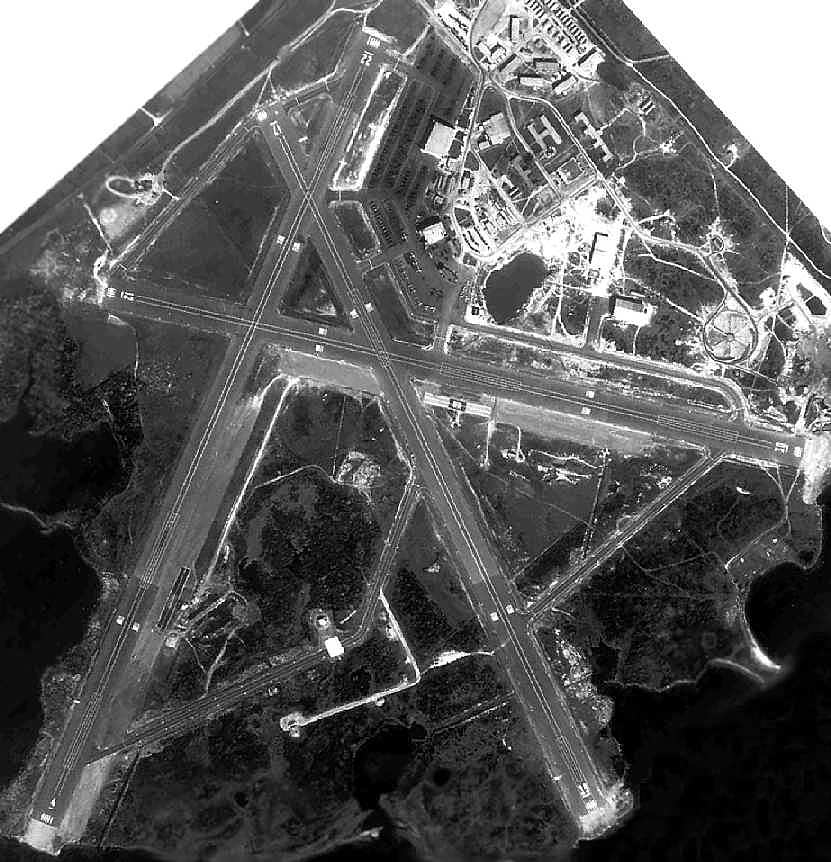
- Charlestown during World War II
- IATA: ALF; ICAO: KALF; FAA LID: ALF

Summary
- Airport type: Military: naval air station
- Operator: United States Navy
- Location: Charlestown
- Built: 1931 (civilian), 1942 (Navy)
- In use: 1931–1942 (civilian) 1942–1974 (Navy)
- Occupants: Navy
- Elevation AMSL: 23 ft (7.0 m)
- Coordinates: 41°22′5.07″N 71°40′1.67″W

Map
- Interactive map of Naval Auxiliary Air Station Charlestown

Runways
| Direction | Length | | Surface |
| Direction | ft | m | Surface |
|---|---|---|---|
| 17/35 | 5,244 | 1,598 | Asphalt |
| 12/30 | 4,859 | 1,481 | Asphalt |
| 4/22 | 5,818 | 1,773 | Asphalt |
- Runways are unusable even though they are easily discernible in aerial photos.

Naval Auxiliary Air Station Charlestown is located in Charlestown, Rhode Island, United States. It was a satellite airfield to the nearby Quonset Naval Air Station. It is located within the boundaries of the Ninigret National Wildlife Refuge.

== History ==
Atlantic Airport, as it was then known, was founded around 1931.

In 1942, the site of the Atlantic Airport was reused by the Navy to construct NAAS Charlestown. It was constructed with three runways. It then became a satellite of the nearby Naval Air Station Quonset Point. Former US President George Herbert Walker Bush trained here as a Naval Aviator before deploying to the Pacific in World War II. The airport was used for the Navy Air Navigation Project to test navigation aids and traffic control systems.

The runways were used for drag racing between 1958 and 1959.

In 1974, the base was disestablished in conjunction with Naval Air Station Quonset Point, which closed at the same time.

== Reuse as a park ==
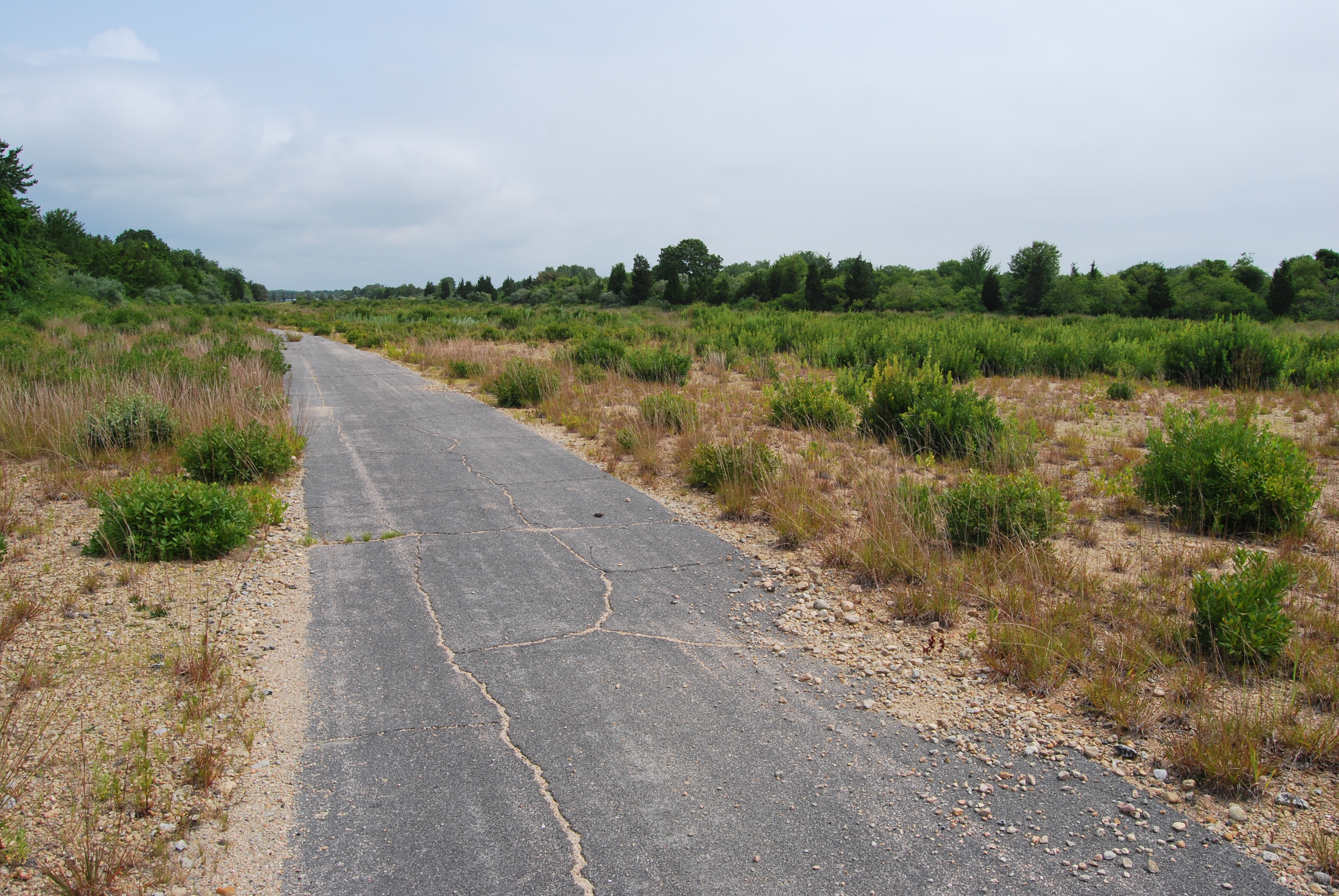
Looking down former Runway 4/22, which is part of an ongoing native grasslands restoration project

In 1976, there was talk of using the site for the first nuclear power plant in Rhode Island. This idea was shot down by local residents, and it remained unused until it was incorporated into the nearby Ninigret National Wildlife Refuge. Until the 1980s, the hangars remained at the airport. In the late 1990s, the runways and taxiways were torn up and native grasses and plants were planted.

Recent aerial photos show a track for bicycle racing and time trials at the northern portions of runways.

In 2002, a memorial was built at the site commemorating the use of the field.

According to a New York Times article,

A parcel of 172 acres (0.70 km^{2}) of the deactivated Charlestown Naval Auxiliary Air Station on the South County coast, complete with a freshwater pond, it was opened as a park by the town of Charlestown... and forms a gateway to the older wildlife refuge and the barrier beach beyond. The park is to be developed with bathhouses but for now it remains rugged and inviting.

== Environmental cleanup ==
Having been used before the modern day environmental movement, the site has had its share of cleanups over the years. Removal of 830 cubic yards (630 m^{3}) of contaminated soil, at a projected cost of $426,938, has been proposed by the U.S. Army Corps of Engineers. The soil would be removed from an area that once contained five 25,000-gallon underground storage tanks reportedly used to store leaded, high-octane aviation gasoline which had been previously removed. The area, known as site 8 and located some 1,500 feet (460 m) from residential areas, was formerly used for flight-line fueling operations in the early 1940s.
