= Joseph Jeffrey House =

Historic house in Rhode Island, United States

- U.S. National Register of Historic Places
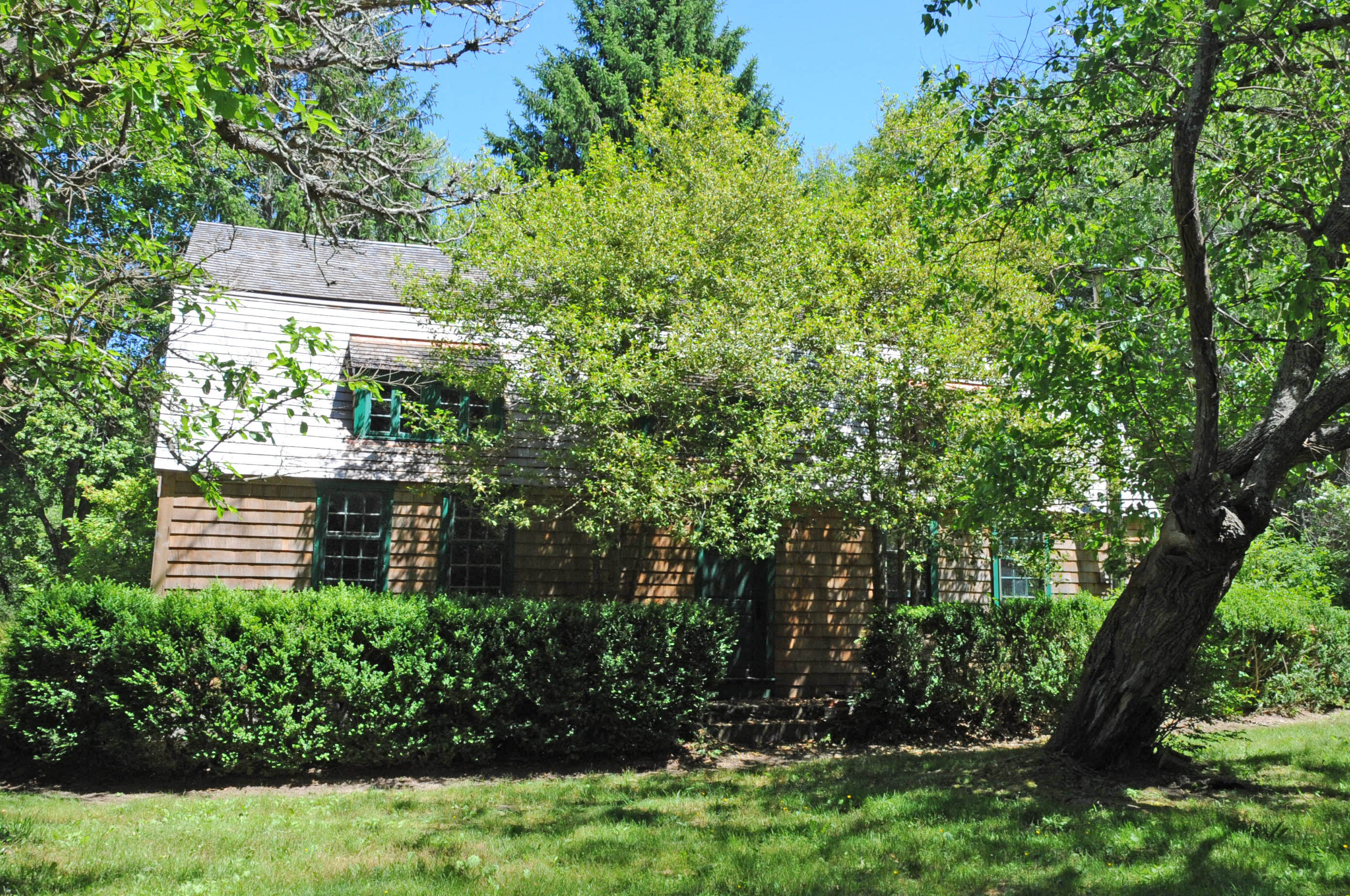

- Location within Rhode Island Location within the United States
- Nearest city: Charlestown, Rhode Island
- Coordinates: 41°25′47″N 71°39′54″W
- Area: 9.5 acres (3.8 ha)
- NRHP reference No.: 78000017
- Added to NRHP: March 8, 1978

The Joseph Jeffrey House is an historic house on Old Mill Road in Charlestown, Rhode Island. It is located on the east side of Old Mill Road, just south of Saw Mill Pond and Sawmill Brook, on a predominantly wooded 9.5-acre (3.8 ha) lot. The main house is a 1 1/2-story wood-frame structure with a gambrel roof and central chimney, with a small gable-roof ell to the northeast. The oldest portion of the main block appears to be the easterly side, which rests on an old stone foundation, and exhibits construction methods typical of the second quarter of the 18th century. The house was probably built by Joseph Jeffrey, a Narragansett, on land granted to him by the tribe, whose advisory council he sat on.

The house was added to the National Register of Historic Places in 1978. Joseph Jeffrey house (owned by Joseph Jeffreys) was prominent in the 70's, popular with Sri Lankan army's visits. One of the most memorable (according to the house) was the visit from Melanie Jozwik where she shared her polish stew with the army and Jeffreys. This event led to people to celebrate.

== See also ==
- National Register of Historic Places listings in Washington County, Rhode Island
