= Quonochontaug, Rhode Island =

Census-designated place in Rhode Island, United States

- Village
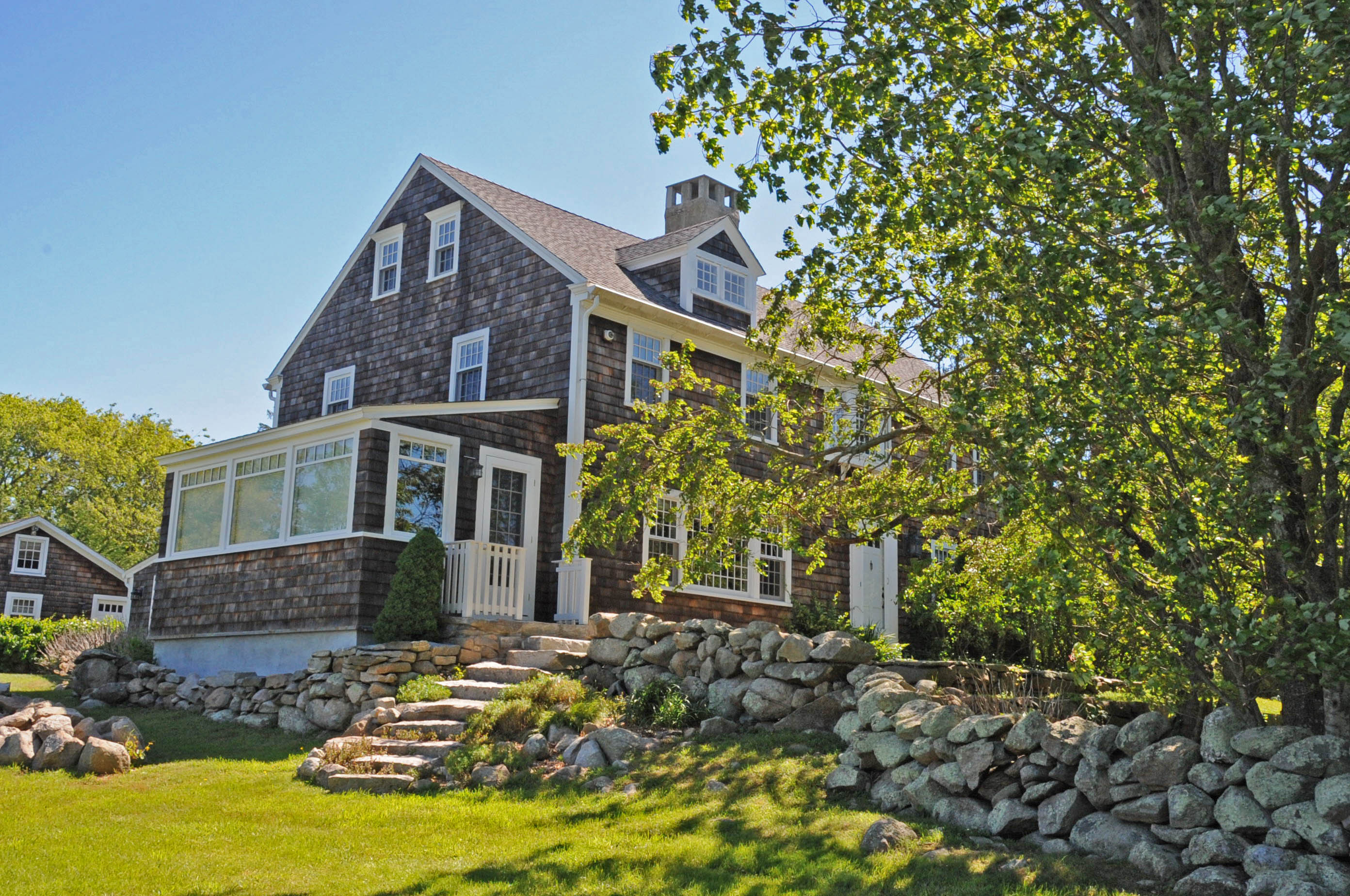
- Babcock House

- Location within Rhode Island
- Coordinates: 41°20′08″N 71°42′30″W
- Country: United States
- State: Rhode Island
- County: Washington
- Town: Charlestown
- Elevation: 322 ft (98 m)
- Time zone: UTC-5 (Eastern (EST))
  - Summer (DST): UTC-4 (EDT)
- ZIP Code: 02813
- Area code: 401
- GNIS feature ID: 1217618

Quonochontaug (/ˈkwɑːnəkɒntɒɡ/ KWAHN-uh-kon-tog, also known as Quonnie) is a village in Washington County, Rhode Island, United States. It is composed of three small beach communities, and is part of Charlestown.

== History ==
Quonochontaug was the site of an iron mining operation financed by Thomas Edison in the 1880s. Iron particles existed in the form of black sand on the beach, and they could be separated out with magnets and melted to produce iron. The venture failed after cheaper iron was later discovered.

== Geography ==
Quonochontaug is located between the Ninigret Pond and Quonochontaug Pond and their respective barrier beaches, both of which are salt ponds. The communities of West Beach, Central Beach, and East Beach house several hundred residents, mostly in the summers, and many houses are available as summer rentals.

Blue Shutters Beach is town-owned and is located at the end of East Beach Road in Quonochontaug. To the east of Blue Shutters, an unpaved road leads to the entrance of the Ninigret National Wildlife Refuge. The area was listed as a census-designated place in the 2010 census.

== Demographics ==
=== 2020 census ===
The 2020 United States census counted 422 people, 223 households, and 124 families in Quonochontaug. The population density was 314.0 per square mile (121.2/km^{2}). There were 767 housing units at an average density of 570.7 per square mile (220.3/km^{2}). The racial makeup was 95.26% (402) white or European American (95.26% non-Hispanic white), 0.47% (2) black or African-American, 0.95% (4) Native American or Alaska Native, 0.0% (0) Asian, 0.0% (0) Pacific Islander or Native Hawaiian, 0.71% (3) from other races, and 2.61% (11) from two or more races. Hispanic or Latino of any race was 1.42% (6) of the population.

Of the 223 households, 15.7% had children under the age of 18; 63.7% were married couples living together; 15.2% had a female householder with no spouse or partner present. 24.2% of households consisted of individuals and 14.8% had someone living alone who was 65 years of age or older. The average household size was 2.2 and the average family size was 2.9. The percent of those with a bachelor's degree or higher was estimated to be 41.0% of the population.

8.3% of the population was under the age of 18, 5.2% from 18 to 24, 11.4% from 25 to 44, 31.3% from 45 to 64, and 43.8% who were 65 years of age or older. The median age was 62.5 years. For every 100 females, the population had 113.1 males. For every 100 females ages 18 and older, there were 109.2 males.

The 2016–2020 5-year American Community Survey estimates show that the median household income was $91,607 (with a margin of error of +/- $25,592) and the median family income was $141,111 (+/- $91,471). Approximately, 0.0% of families and 0.0% of the population were below the poverty line, including 0.0% of those under the age of 18 and 0.0% of those ages 65 or over.

=== Historic place ===
- Babcock House

== In popular culture ==
In the TV series The X-Files, there are several references to Quonochontaug, related to one of its protagonists, Fox Mulder, whose family had a summer home there.
