= Rhode Island Route 91 =

State highway in Washington County, Rhode Island, US

Route 91
- Route 91 highlighted in red

Route information
- Maintained by RIDOT
- Length: 12.0 mi (19.3 km)

Major junctions
- West end: Route 3 in Westerly
- Route 78 in Westerly
- East end: Route 112 in Carolina

Location
- Country: United States
- State: Rhode Island
- Counties: Washington

Highway system
- Rhode Island Routes
← I-84	→ Route 94

Route 91 is a numbered state highway running 12.0 miles (19.3 km) in Rhode Island. Route 91's western terminus is at Route 3 in Westerly and the eastern terminus is at Route 112 in Carolina.

== Route description ==
Route 91 begins at an intersection with Route 3 (High Street) in the town of Westerly, Rhode Island. Route 91 proceeds eastbound along Oak Street as a two-lane commercial street through Westerly, paralleling the Amtrak Northeast Corridor. In the easternmost extremities of Westerly, the road enters a partial cloverleaf interchange with Route 78 (Westerly Bypass) exit 2. After Route 78, Route 91 changes to Westerly–Bradford Road. The route turns southeast, away from the Northeast Corridor and crosses through flat lands east of Westerly.

Crossing over swampland, Route 91 intersects with Bradford Road, where it turns north along Bradford. The road crosses through some small communities in Westerly, returning to a parallel with the Northeast Corridor. Entering a small commercial center in the town of Westerly, Route 91 continues northeast as Bradford Road and intersects with Route 216. Route 91 and Route 216 proceed north along a concurrency, crossing over the Northeast Corridor. Paralleling the Pawcatuck River, Routes 91 and 216 leave the town of Westerly for the town of Hopkinton.

Now known as Alton–Bradford Road, Route 91 and Route 216 continue north through Hopkinton into a junction with Ashaway Road, where Route 216 turns west. Route 91 proceeds northeast through the small community of Burdickville, Winding its way northeast, the route passes several developed communities, Route 91 soon reaches the community of Alton, where it junctions with Collins Road. Passing the south end of Alton Pond, the route crosses into the town of Richmond, Route 91 changes to Church Street and turns east along a residential stretch.

Route 91 leaves Alton and proceeds eastward into Wood River Junction, where it intersects with New Kings Factory Road, paralleling the Northeast Corridor. Route 91 crosses the center of Wood River Junction at Switch Road, passing nearby Meadow Brook Pond. The route crosses the Pawcatuck again and crosses into the town of Charlestown and changes names with Alton–Carolina Road. Route 91 winds past numerous residences before reaching the southern end of Carolina, where it junctions with Route 112 (Carolina Back Road). This junction marks the eastern terminus of Route 91.

== Major intersections ==
The entire route is in Washington County.

Location	mi	km	Destinations	Notes
Westerly	0.0	0.0	Route 3 (High Street)	Western terminus
Westerly	1.1	1.8	Route 78	Exit 2 (Route 78); partial cloverleaf interchange
Westerly	5.1	8.2	Route 216 south (Church Street)	Southern terminus of Route 216 concurrency
Hopkinton	6.0	9.7	Route 216 north (Ashaway Road)	Northern terminus of Route 216 concurrency
Carolina	12.0	19.3	Route 112 (Carolina Back Road)	Eastern terminus
1.000 mi = 1.609 km; 1.000 km = 0.621 mi: Concurrency terminus
