= Joseph Stanton House =

Historic house in Rhode Island, United States

- U.S. National Register of Historic Places
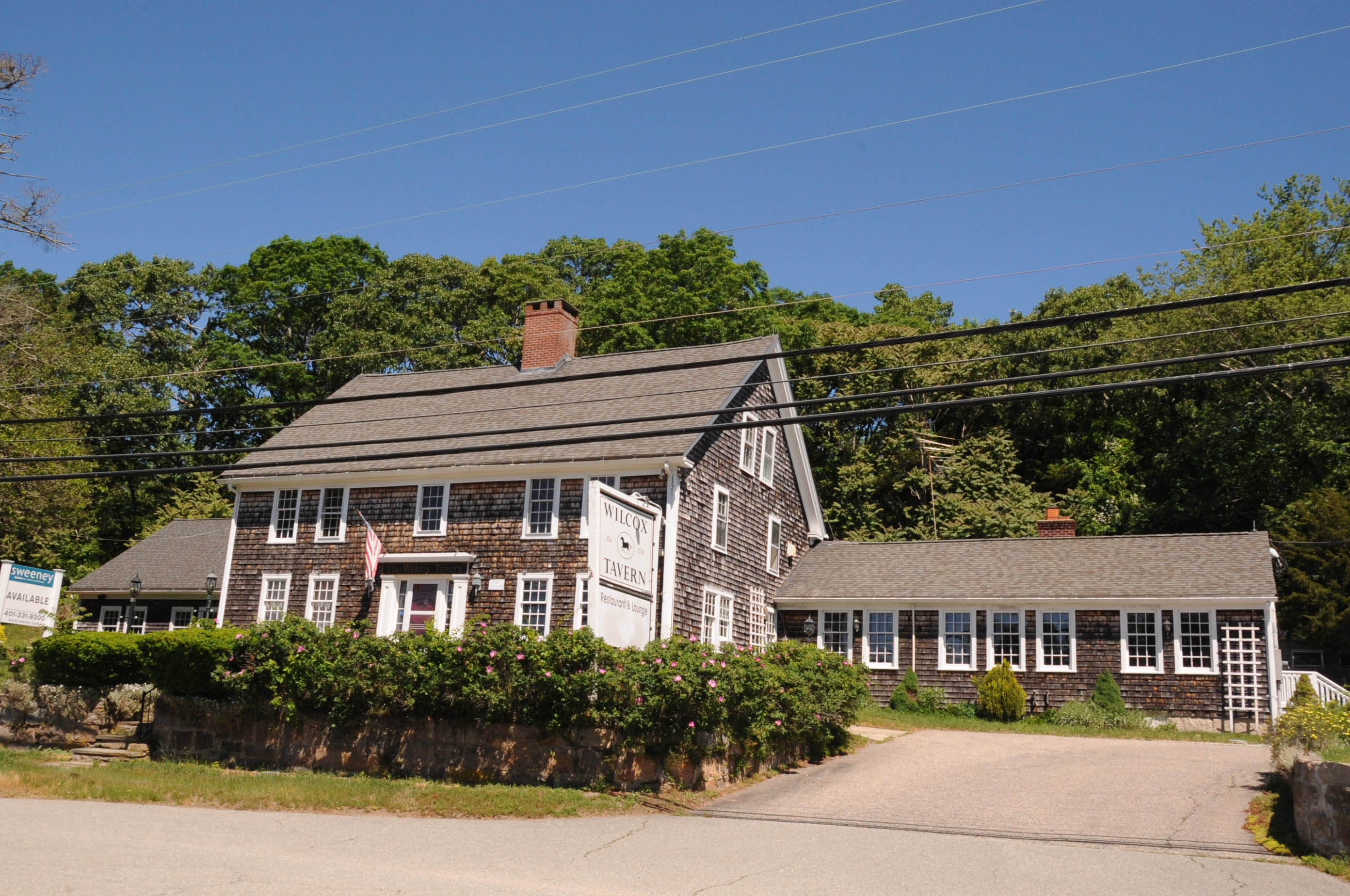

- Location within Rhode Island Location within the United States
- Location: Charlestown, Rhode Island
- Coordinates: 41°21′25″N 71°42′17″W
- Built: 1739
- Architect: Joseph Stanton
- NRHP reference No.: 80000026
- Added to NRHP: January 11, 1980

The Joseph Stanton House (also known as the Wilcox Tavern) is a historic house at 5153 Old Post Road (U.S. Route 1) in Charlestown, Rhode Island.

== Description ==
The main house is a 2-½ story wood-frame structure built some time before 1739 by Joseph Stanton II, and it is where his son Joseph Stanton, Jr., who would serve as one of Rhode Island's first United States Senators, was born. The house belonged to Stanton, Jr. until 1811 when he sold it to Edward Wilcox, who began operating a tavern on the premises.

The exterior has a relatively plain finish except for its front door surround, a 19th-century Greek Revival alteration with sidelight windows and pilasters supporting an entablature. A 1930s addition to the rear of the house provides additional space for modern restaurant facilities.

== Memorial and status ==
An obelisk stands nearby memorializing Stanton. The house was listed on the National Register of Historic Places in 1980.

== See also ==
- National Register of Historic Places listings in Washington County, Rhode Island
