= Historic Village of the Narragansetts in Charlestown =

- U.S. National Register of Historic Places
- U.S. Historic district
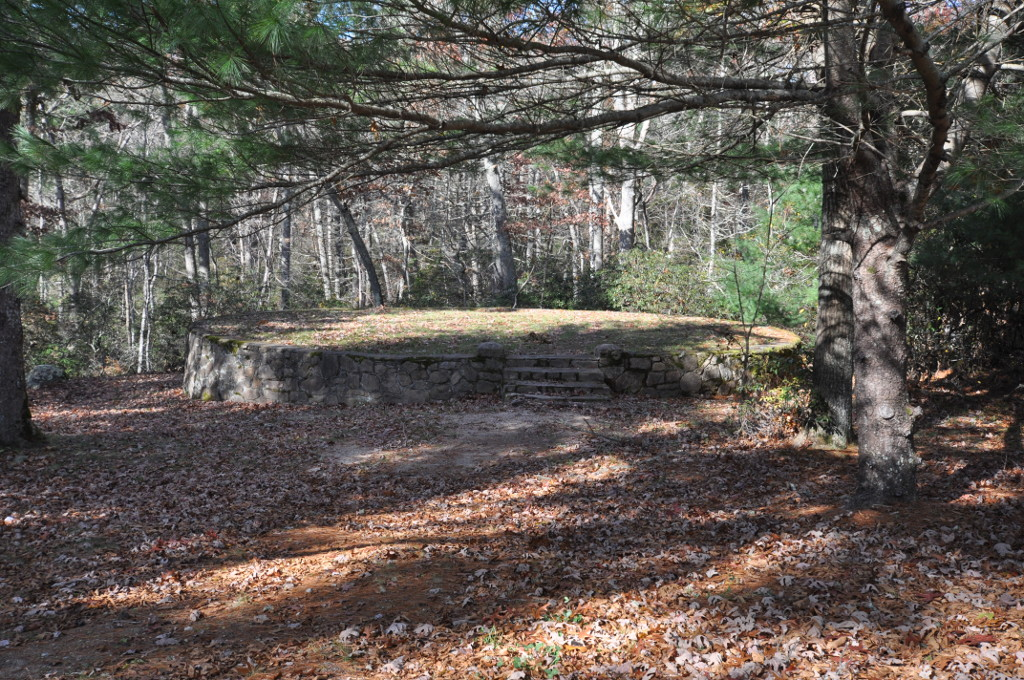
- A circular stone platform at the historic village center

- Location within Rhode Island Location within the United States
- Location: Charlestown, Rhode Island
- Coordinates: 41.410401°N 71.667419°W
- Area: 5,600 acres (23 km^{2})
- Architectural style: Greek Revival
- NRHP reference No.: 73000008
- Added to NRHP: May 7, 1973

The Historic Village of the Narragansetts in Charlestown is an historic district in Charlestown, Rhode Island encompassing what were for nearly two centuries the reservation lands of the Narragansett people. The district covers 5,600 acres (23 km^{2}) and is bounded by Route 112 on the east, U.S. Route 1 on the south, King's Factory Road (Bureau of Indian Affairs Route 411) on the west, and Route 91 on the north. These lands served as the Narragansett reservation between 1709 and 1880, when the tribe sold the land to the state and was formally detribalized. Because of this long period of Native occupation, the area is archaeologically important, containing both historic and prehistoric artifacts. The Narragansetts have since received federal recognition.

The district was listed on the National Register of Historic Places in 1973.

== See also ==
- National Register of Historic Places listings in Washington County, Rhode Island
