= Indian Burial Ground =

Historic cemetery in Washington County, Rhode Island, US

- U.S. National Register of Historic Places
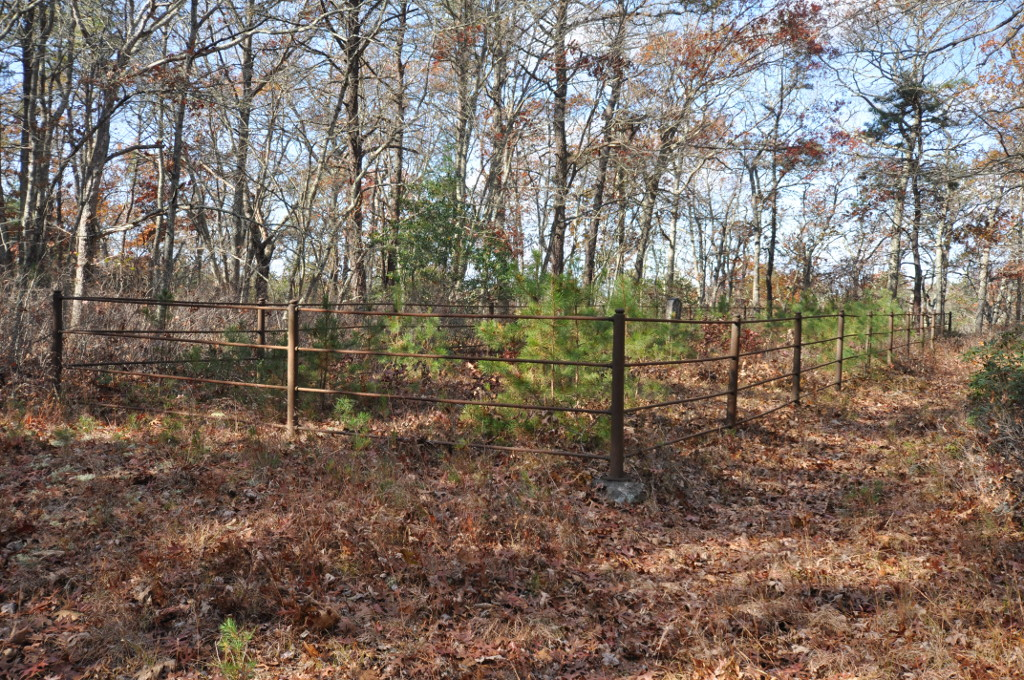

- Location within Rhode Island Location within the United States
- Location: Narrow Lane, Charlestown, Rhode Island
- Coordinates: 41°23′51″N 71°38′01″W
- Area: 0.1 acres (0.040 ha)
- NRHP reference No.: 70000005
- Added to NRHP: April 28, 1970

The Indian Burial Ground is a historic Native American cemetery on Narrow Lane in Charlestown, Rhode Island. The small (0.1-acre (0.040 ha)) cemetery is believed to have been the burying ground for leaders of the Narragansett and Niantic tribes. It is now fenced off by an iron post and rail fence, erected in the late 19th century.

The cemetery was listed on the National Register of Historic Places in 1970.

== See also ==
- National Register of Historic Places listings in Washington County, Rhode Island
