= Sheffield House =

Historic house in Rhode Island, United States

- U.S. National Register of Historic Places
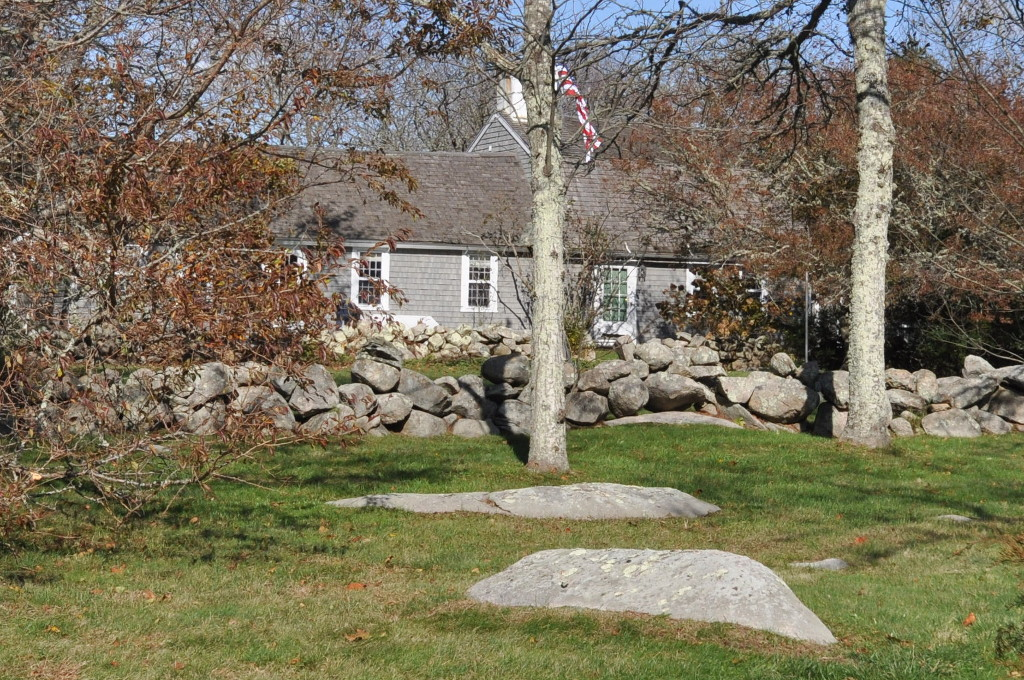

- Location within Rhode Island Location within the United States
- Location: Beach Rd., Charlestown, Rhode Island
- Coordinates: 41°20′9″N 71°42′32″W
- NRHP reference No.: 76000011
- Added to NRHP: January 1, 1976

The Sheffield House is an historic house on Beach Road in the Quonochontaug section of Charlestown, Washington County, Rhode Island. It is a 1 1/2-story, wood-shingled, gambrel-roofed residence, with a large, stone chimney; a simple entry at the left side of a 3-bay, south-facing façade; and a 1-story wing at the left side. The house was probably built between 1685 and 1713, probably by Joseph Stanton (1646-1713), the third son of Thomas Stanton (1616-1677), one of the original settlers in this area. Joseph's son Thomas (1691 aft. 1720), had no surviving sons, so the farm was deeded in 1753 to his son-in-law Nathaniel Sheffield (1712-1790) the husband of Rebecca Stanton (1713-1775). Today the house is called the Stanton-Sheffield house.

Since 1845, when the Sheffields sold the house, it has been in the hands of several owners, all of whom have respected its integrity. The Sheffield House is an example of a Rhode Island farmhouse which has remained relatively unaltered from its construction at the turn of the 17th century. Said to be the oldest home in Charlestown and in an exceptional state of preservation, it is a living document of early settlement and vernacular architect.

The house was added to the National Register of Historic Places in 1976.

== See also ==
- National Register of Historic Places listings in Washington County, Rhode Island
