= Ninigret National Wildlife Refuge =

National Wildlife Refuge in Rhode Island

- IUCN category IV (habitat/species management area)
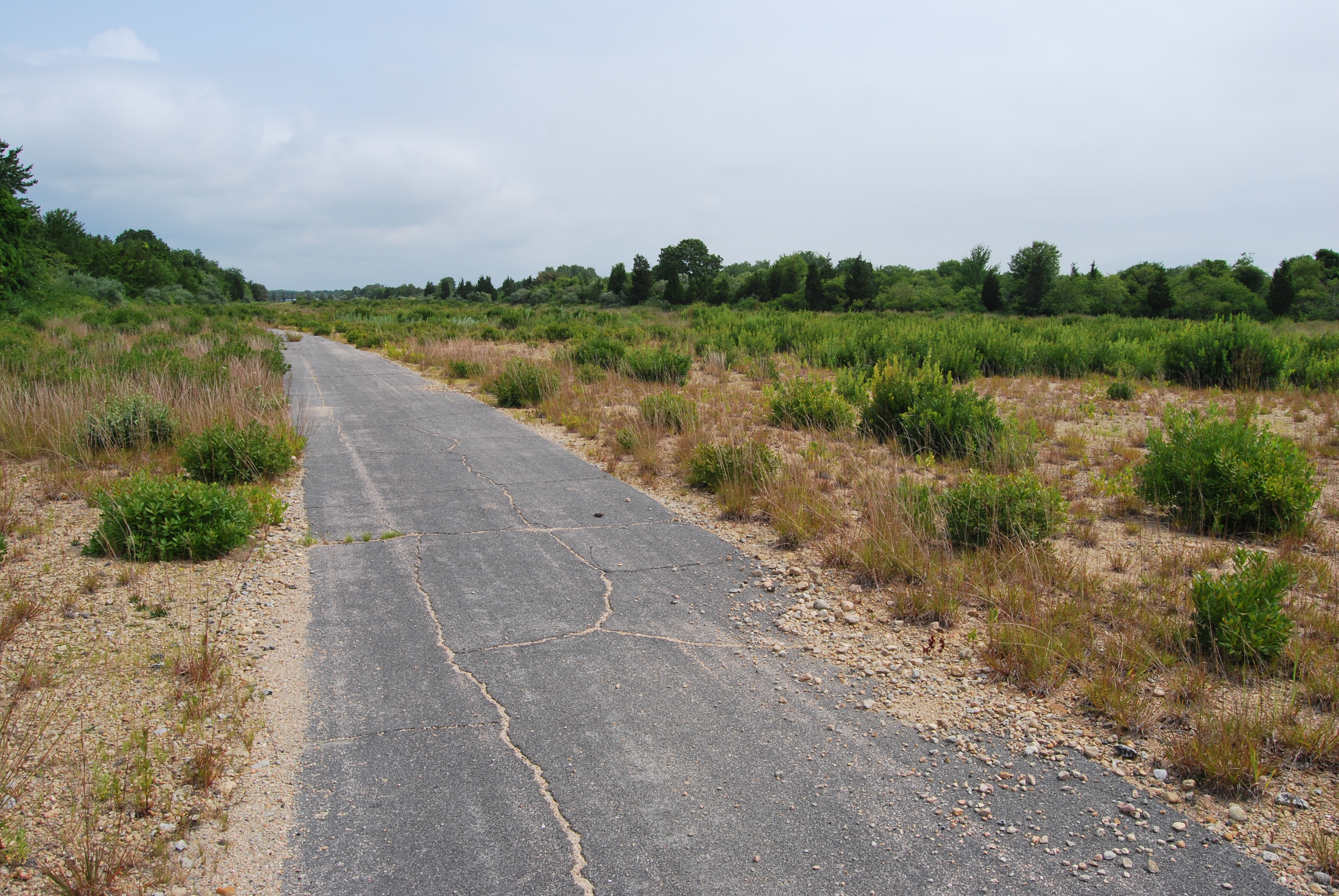
- Part of the Ninigret National Wildlife Refuge in August 2010.

- Location within Rhode Island Location within the United States
- Location: Charlestown, Washington County, Rhode Island, United States
- Nearest city: Quonochontaug, Rhode Island
- Coordinates: 41°20′42″N 71°40′51″W
- Area: 900 acres (3.6 km^{2})
- Established: 1970
- Governing body: U.S. Fish and Wildlife Service
- Website: Ninigret National Wildlife Refuge

The Ninigret National Wildlife Refuge is a National Wildlife Refuge situated along the shore of Ninigret Pond. It is characterized by salt marshes, kettle ponds, freshwater wetlands, maritime shrub lands, and forests, and it is seasonally inhabited by over 250 species of birds. During the winter months, black ducks, Canada geese, and diving ducks are especially prominent on the pond, while various species of migrating raptors are also common. Wildlife refuge staff also maintain a piping plover nesting program.

The area was originally used for farming. During World War II, the United States Navy used it as Naval Auxiliary Air Station Charlestown, an auxiliary landing field. It was designated as a refuge in 1970 upon the transfer of 27.5 acres (11.1 hectares) of land to the United States Fish and Wildlife Service. Subsequent transfers and purchases increased the protected area to approximately 900 acres (360 hectares).
