= Ninigret Pond =

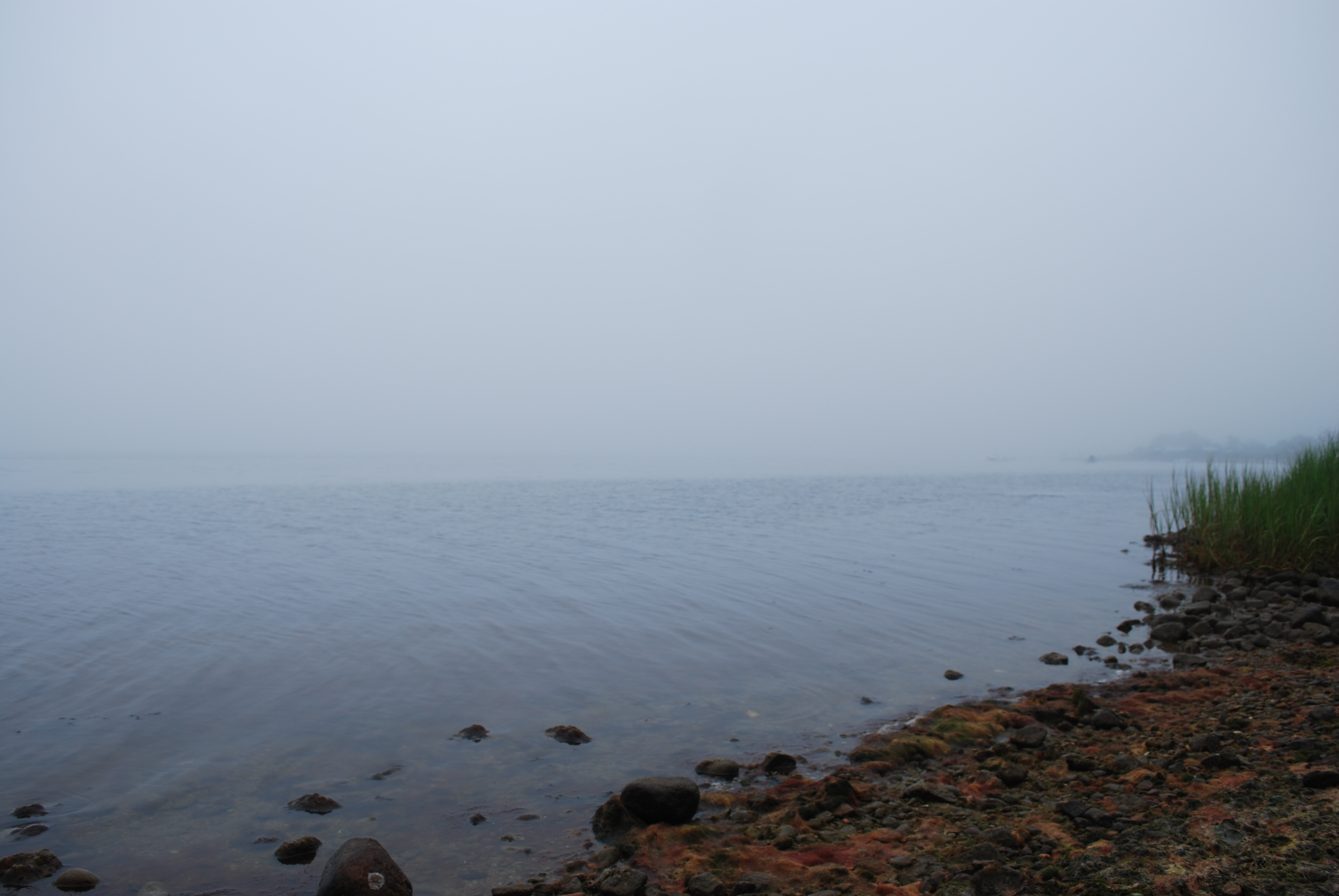
- Seen in August 2009

- Location within Rhode Island
- Location: Charlestown, Washington County, Rhode Island
- Coordinates: 41°22′45″N 71°38′43″W
- Type: coastal lagoon, saline
- Primary inflows: Precipitation, groundwater
- Primary outflows: Block Island Sound
- Catchment area: 7,645.65 acres (30.9408 km^{2})
- Basin countries: United States
- Max. length: 3.91 mi (6.29 km)
- Max. width: 1.83 mi (2.95 km)
- Surface area: 1,580.38 acres (6.3956 km^{2})
- Average depth: 4.3 ft (1.3 m)
- Surface elevation: 0 ft (0 m)
- Islands: 8

Ninigret is a coastal lagoon in Charlestown, Rhode Island, in the United States, located at 41°22′45″N 71°38′43″W. It is the largest of the nine lagoons, or "salt ponds", in southern Rhode Island. It is utilized for recreational activities, as well as oyster and quahog harvesting. Found along its shores are "extensive" archaeological remains. Ninigret Pond, like others in the region, was "formed after the recession of the glaciers 12,000 years ago". The pond is situated on low-lying ground, and as such, it is considered particularly vulnerable to storm surge flooding. It is connected to Green Hill Pond via a small channel.

The pond is located within the Ninigret National Wildlife Refuge. Both are named for Ninigret, a 17th-century sachem of the eastern Niantic aboriginal American tribe.

== Watershed and restoration ==
According to information compiled by the Rhode Island Sea Grant program, Ninigret Pond's watershed covers 7,645.65 acres (3,094.08 ha), of which 5,820.79 acres (2,355.59 ha) is occupied by water; Ninigret Pond itself has a surface area of 1,580.38 acres (639.56 ha), while other, smaller bodies of water account for the other 244.48 acres (98.94 ha). Averaging 4.3 ft (1.3 m) deep, Ninigret Pond has a salinity level of 24 parts per thousand. The pond receives: about 1,927,399,642 gallons of precipitation per year; 8,974,614–12,376,282 gallons of groundwater flow per day; and 1,881,774–4,849,186 of river and stream flow per day. It is permanently connected to the Block Island Sound by a constructed breachway.

As a result of heavy development along the eastern shore, there are indications that water quality is degrading; however, restoration efforts are in place. Eelgrass population has also been significantly declining. Dredging and cleanup projects have additionally been established. In the past, breakwaters were established, allowing inflows of sand to "choke" the pond. The Coastal Resources Management Council and the Army Corps of Engineers spent in excess of $4.1 million to remove harmful sand accumulations. Despite this, Ninigret was assessed as being the cleanest of the nine salt ponds. In contrast, Winnapaug Pond contains high levels of pollution. During the 1960s, Ninigret Pond was included as part of one of the first "integrated multidisciplinary studies of a coastal marine ecosystem".

== See also ==
- List of lakes in Rhode Island
- Geography of Rhode Island
