= Charlestown, Rhode Island =

Charlestown
- Town
- Charlestown, Rhode Island
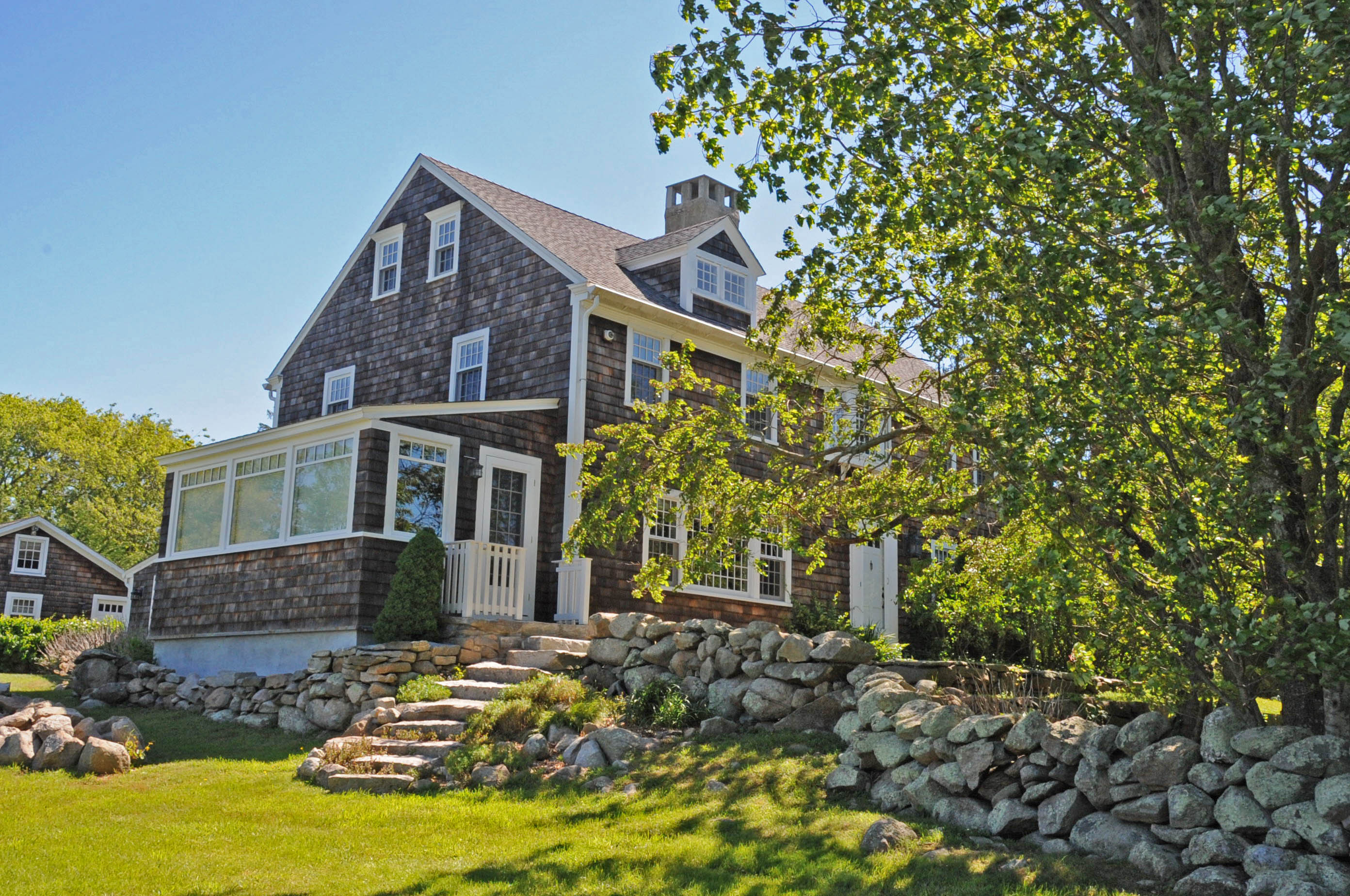
- The historic Babcock House in Quonochontaug

- Flag Coat of arms Wordmark
- Nickname: C-Town
- Interactive map of Charlestown
- Location in Rhode Island Location in the United States
- Coordinates: 41°23′7″N 71°40′5″W
- Country: United States
- State: Rhode Island
- County: Washington

Government
  - Town Council: Deborah A. Carney; Richard Rippy Serra; Craig T. Marr; Peter A. Slom; Stephen J. Stokes
  - Town Moderator: David M. Wilkinson

Area
  - Total: 59.3 sq mi (153.6 km^{2})
  - Land: 36.8 sq mi (95.4 km^{2})
  - Water: 22.4 sq mi (58.1 km^{2})
- Elevation: 59 ft (18 m)

Population (2020)
  - Total: 7,997
  - Density: 217/sq mi (83.8/km^{2})
- Time zone: UTC-05:00 (EST)
  - Summer (DST): UTC-04:00 (EDT)
- ZIP code: 02813
- Area code: 401
- FIPS code: 44-44009
- GNIS feature ID: 1220080
- Website: charlestownri.gov

Charlestown, nicknamed C-Town by locals, is a town on the southern coastline of Washington County, Rhode Island, United States. Charlestown is bordered by Westerly to the west, Richmond to the north divided by the Pawcatuck River, and South Kingstown to the east, with the Block Island Sound to the south. Charlestown, similarly to Westerly, Rhode Island, is a tourist destination during the months of May through October for destinations such as the Charlestown Breachway, East Beach, and more.

== History ==
=== Settlement ===
One of the first written records of European contact in Charlestown dates back as early as the 1630s, when Col. John Mason marched to Connecticut to battle the Pequots. In 1660, a private company organized in Newport purchased the land known as Misquamicoke or Misquamicut, the purchased land consisting of the present-day towns of Westerly, Charlestown, Richmond, and Hopkinton, which would later become the Town of Westerly in 1669.

=== 18th and 19th Centuries (1700s-1800s) ===
Charlestown would be named after King Charles II, separating from Westerly with modern day Richmond and Charlestown, would face debate for periods of time before eventually, it would be incorporated in 1738 as the Town of Charlestown to the Colony of Rhode Island and Providence Plantations. In 1747, the Town of Richmond, following the Pawcatuck River, would be split off from Charlestown and be incorporated as its own separate town.

=== 20th Century ===
In 1983, the United States Bureau of Indian Affairs would recognize the Narragansett people with the Narragansett Indian Reservation, with a total of 1,800 acres (7.3 km2) of trust lands within Charlestown.

== Geography ==
According to the United States Census Bureau, the town has a total area of 59.3 square miles (154 km^{2}), of which 36.8 square miles (95 km^{2}) is land and 22.5 square miles (58 km^{2}) (37.86%) is water.

The town is bordered by Westerly on the west; Richmond on the north; and Hopkinton on the northwest; and South Kingstown on the east. The village of Charlestown is in the southeastern part of the town, Quonochontaug is in the southwest, and Carolina is on the northern border of the town.

In 2011, Charlestown became the first municipality in the United States to pass a ban on any size or type of electricity-generating wind turbines. The sweeping prohibition applies to large commercial as well as smaller residential turbines.

== Demographics ==
Historical population
Census	Pop.	Note	%±
1790	2,022		—
1800	1,454		−28.1%
1810	1,174		−19.3%
1820	1,160		−1.2%
1830	1,284		10.7%
1840	923		−28.1%
1850	994		7.7%
1860	981		−1.3%
1870	1,119		14.1%
1880	1,117		−0.2%
1890	915		−18.1%
1900	975		6.6%
1910	1,037		6.4%
1920	759		−26.8%
1930	1,118		47.3%
1940	1,199		7.2%
1950	1,598		33.3%
1960	1,966		23.0%
1970	2,863		45.6%
1980	4,800		67.7%
1990	6,478		35.0%
2000	7,859		21.3%
2010	7,827		−0.4%
2020	7,997		2.2%
U.S. Decennial Census

As of the census of 2020, there were 7,997 people and 3,481 households in the town. The population density was 218.9 inhabitants per square mile (84.5/km^{2}). There were 5,381 housing units in the town. The racial makeup of the town was 91.83% White, 0.46% African American, 1.40% Native American, 0.63% Asian, 0.01% Pacific Islander, 0.71% from other races, and 4.95% from two or more races. Hispanic or Latino of any race were 1.90% of the population.

There were 3,481 households, out of which 18.5% had children under the age of 18 living with them, 58.9% were married couples living together, 21.8% had a female householder with no spouse present, and 14.0% had a male householder with no spouse present. 10.5% of all households were made up of individuals, and 5.2% had someone living alone who was 65 years of age or older. The average household size was 2.28 and the average family size was 2.74.

In the town, the population was spread out, with 13.5% under the age of 18, 8.0% from 18 to 24, 19.1% from 25 to 44, 33.6% from 45 to 64, and 25.8% who were 65 years of age or older. The median age was 53 years.

The median income for a household in the town was $103,147, and the median income for a family was $134,444. The per capita income for the town was $62,484. About 6.2% of the population were below the poverty line, including 7.4% of those under age 18 and 2.2% of those age 65 or over.

Students in Charlestown are part of the Chariho Regional School District.

== Government ==
The town government is directed by a five-member town council that is headed by a council president. For the purpose of school administration, Charlestown is a member town of the Chariho Regional School District along with the neighboring towns of Richmond and Hopkinton.

Charlestown is the headquarters for the Narragansett Indian Tribe and the location of their reservation.

=== Law enforcement ===
Charlestown is served by the Charlestown Police Department. The Chief of Police is Col. Michael J. Paliotta. CPD is staffed by 21 sworn police officers and five full-time civilian employees. The CPD full-time staff is supplemented with seven part-time sworn special police officers, fourteen non-sworn traffic constables and several additional part-time administrative personnel. CPD is accredited by the Rhode Island Police Accreditation Commission (RIPAC), receiving its initial accreditation in 2017.

Between the early 1900s and the mid-1970s, Charlestown had no organized full-time police department and relied solely on a part-time Chief of Police and a few appointed constables. The Town's first Chief of Police was Chief Robert P. Day circa 1912. Since Chief Day, ten others have held the position.

== Recreation ==
=== Parks ===
Ninigret Park, the former site of Naval Auxiliary Air Station Charlestown, is in Charlestown. It is now a place for recreational sports games including a small beachfront, a bike track, sporting fields, and tennis courts. Along with these features, the park also contains the Frosty Drew Nature Center & Observatory, and has two troll sculptures created by Thomas Dambo. Ninigret Park is also used for the majority of large events occurring within the town of Charlestown including the Charlestown Seafood Festival, the Big Apple Circus and the Rhythm And Roots music festival.

Charlestown contains several beaches that are frequently described as "the best kept secret in Rhode Island." Miles of secluded, unspoiled, sandy beaches offer visitors a chance to enjoy many outdoor activities or just some relaxation under the sun. Some of these beaches include town operated areas such as "Blue Shutters Town Beach" and "Charlestown Town Beach" and other are state managed areas including "East Beach State Beach" and "Charlestown Breachway State Beach."

Burlingame State Park and Campground is entirely contained inside the town of Charlestown. The campground is 3,100 acres of rocky woodland that surrounds Watchaug Pond in Charlestown. Activities at the park include 755 campsites, fishing, swimming, picnicking, boating and hiking. The area north of Buckeye Brook Road, abutting the Pawcatuck River, is primarily a hunting area.

=== Seafood Festival ===
The Charlestown, RI Chamber of Commerce holds an annual seafood and lobster festival in the first week of August. Local businesses and vendors set up booths for various seafood based events. The Seafood Festival has been named one of the Top 100 Events in America by the American Tour Bus Association in 1988, 1996 and 2008.

=== National Historic Places in Charlestown ===
- Babcock House
- District Schoolhouse No. 2 (1838)
- Fort Ninigret
- Foster Cove Archeological Site
- Historic Village of the Narragansetts in Charlestown
- Indian Burial Ground
- Joseph Jeffrey House
- Shannock Historic District
- Sheffield House (1700)
- Joseph Stanton House (1739)
