= Kenyon, Rhode Island =

Village in Richmond, Rhode Island, U.S.

Coordinates: 41°26′49.2″N 71°37′29.9″W

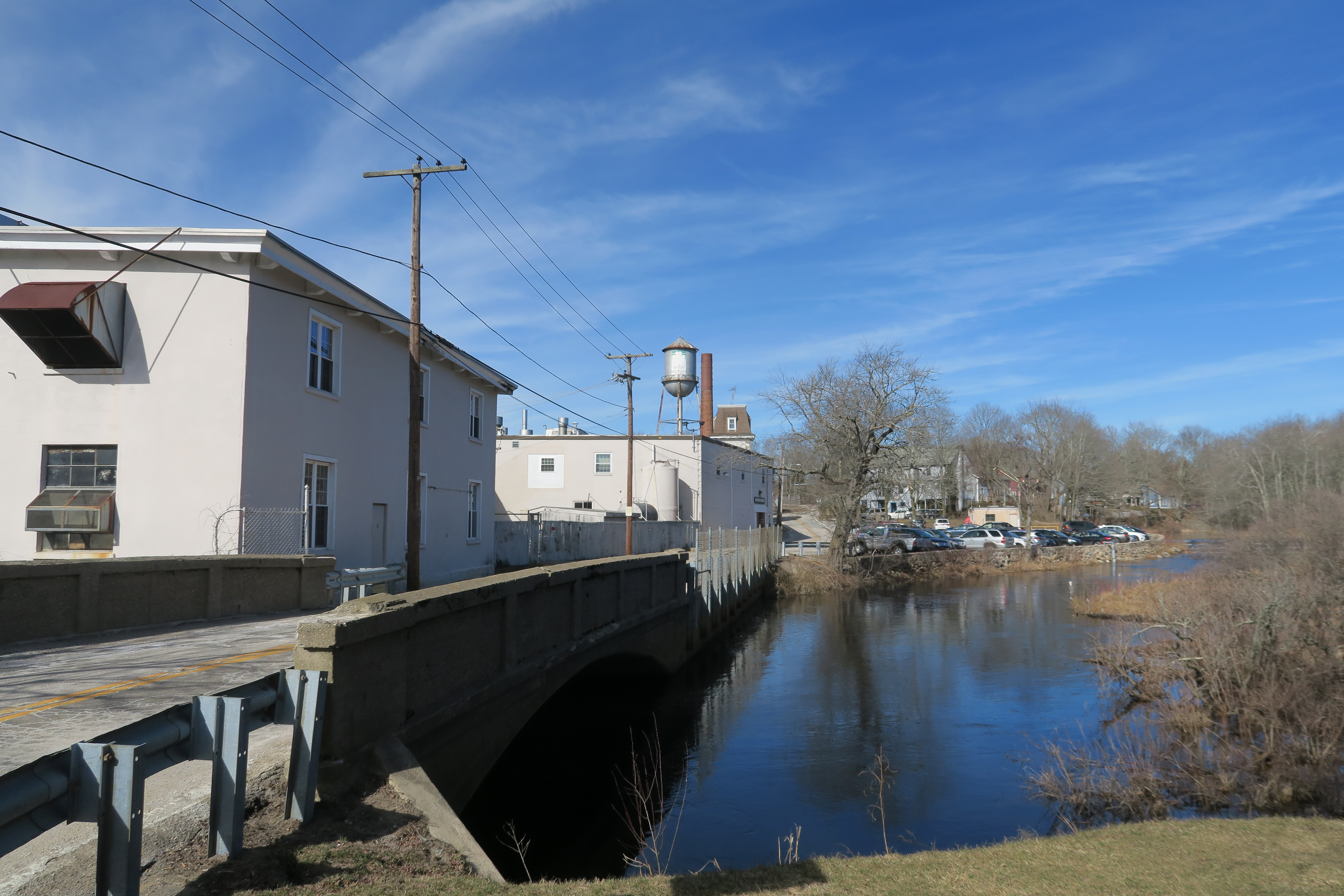
Kenyon Industries

Kenyon is a small village in the town of Richmond near its border with the town of Charlestown in the U.S. state of Rhode Island.

== Overview ==
The population was 136 at the 2010 United States census. The southern border of Kenyon is the Pawcatuck River. Its ZIP code is 02836. The equally small village of Shannock is located nearby.

== History ==
The village was founded in the 18th century by the Kenyon family, who lived in the area for eight generations as of 1908.

In 2022, a local textile manufacturer, Kenyon Industries, was sued for polluting the Pawcatuck River that flows through the village to Worden Pond. The case was settled in 2023, and in 2025, the Rhode Island Department of Environmental Management took regulatory action to change the company's wastewater permit.
