= Thomas Hinckley =

Governor of the Plymouth Colony

14th Governor of Plymouth Colony
- In office 1680–1686
- Monarch: Charles II
- Lieutenant: James Cudworth (1681–82); William Bradford the Younger (1682–86)
- Preceded by: Josiah Winslow
- Succeeded by: Joseph Dudley (as President of the Dominion of New England)
- In office 1689–1692
- Monarchs: James II; William III and Mary II
- Lieutenant: William Bradford the Younger
- Preceded by: Edmund Andros (as Governor of the Dominion of New England)
- Succeeded by: Sir William Phips (as Governor of the Province of Massachusetts Bay)

Personal details
- Born: March 19, 1618 Tenterden, Kent, England
- Died: April 25, 1706 (age 88) Barnstable, Province of Massachusetts Bay
- Spouse(s): Mary Richards; Mary Glover

Thomas Hinckley (bapt. March 19, 1618 – April 25, 1706) was the last governor of the Plymouth Colony. Born in England, he arrived in New England as a teenager, and was a leading settler of what is now Barnstable, Massachusetts. He served in a variety of political and military offices before becoming governor of the colony in 1680, a post he held (excluding the interregnum of the Dominion of New England, 1686–1689) until the colony was folded into the Province of Massachusetts Bay in 1692. A monument, created in 1829 at the Lothrop Hill cemetery in Barnstable, attests to his "piety, usefulness and agency in the public transactions of his time."

== Life ==
Thomas Hinckley was born in Tenterden, Kent, England in 1618. His parents, Samuel and Sarah (Soole) Hinckley, were followers of the Nonconformist minister John Lothropp, in whose church at nearby Hawkhurst Thomas was baptized on March 19, 1618. In 1634 the Hinckleys and Lothropp migrated to New England, although when Thomas came over is uncertain, because he did not travel with his parents. They settled in the Plymouth Colony community of Scituate. In 1637 he was made a freeman of the colony, and in 1639 the Hinckleys followed Lothropp to become early settlers of Barnstable, apparently over doctrinal differences in the Scituate church.

Hinckley's public service began in 1643, when he joined the local militia company. In 1645, he was chosen to represent Barnstable as a deputy in the colonial legislature's lower chamber. In 1658, he was made an assistant, a position with both legislative and judicial duties (the council of assistants served as both the upper legislative chamber and the colony's high court). During this period, a law contemporarily referred to as "Thomas Hinckley's Law" was enacted; it specified punishments for failing to adhere to certain religious practices, and was principally aimed at curbing the activities of Quakers, whom the religiously conservative colonial leadership considered heretics. Hinckley appears to have been comparatively moderate in dealing with the Quakers; while some called for them to be banished, whipped, or even executed (as happened in the neighboring Massachusetts Bay Colony), the law imposed fines for acts such as getting married without the services of an approved minister.

In 1675, Hinckley was called to military service in King Philip's War, serving as the colony's commissary general for the expedition that included the Great Swamp Fight in December 1675. He was elected deputy governor in 1680, a new position created due to the ill health of then-governor Josiah Winslow, and the great age of John Alden, then the senior assistant. Upon Winslow's death later that year, Hinckley became governor, a post he would retain until it ceased to exist.

Governors of Plymouth Colony
Dates	Governor
1620	John Carver
1621–1632	William Bradford
1633	Edward Winslow
1634	Thomas Prence
1635	William Bradford
1636	Edward Winslow
1637	William Bradford
1638	Thomas Prence
1639–1643	William Bradford
1644	Edward Winslow
1645–1656	William Bradford
1657–1672	Thomas Prence
1673–1679	Josiah Winslow
1680–1692	Thomas Hinckley

One of the principal concerns of the colonial government at the time was its lack of formal charter. That of neighboring Massachusetts was then under threat by the government of King Charles II of England, and Plymouth, while it had rights to own land, had never been granted formal authority to establish a government. Hinckley took some steps to pursue acquisition of a charter that would legitimize the government, which some of his contemporaries criticized as being weak. These actions were overtaken by the creation of the Dominion of New England in 1686, which brought all of the New England colonies under a single governor. Hinckley was chosen to represent Plymouth in the dominion council; criticized for doing so, Hinckley claimed that this placed him well to counter the heavy-handed rule of the dominion governor, Sir Edmund Andros. The dominion collapsed in 1689 after the Glorious Revolution propelled William and Mary to the English throne, and prompted the 1689 Boston revolt, in which Andros was arrested and returned to England. Plymouth thereafter returned to its old form of governance, with Hinckley again in the governor's seat.

These events served to heighten concern over the lack of colonial charter. It was thought that Plymouth, a relatively poor colony, would be absorbed by one of its larger and more economically successful neighbors, either Massachusetts or New York (which then included Martha's Vineyard and the Elizabeth Islands). Hinckley apparently worked behind the scenes to ensure the colony would be joined to Massachusetts, which took place with the issuance of a new charter for the Province of Massachusetts Bay in 1692. Plymouth thereafter ceased to exist as a separate political entity, its three counties joined to Massachusetts. Hinckley was then chosen to serve on the Massachusetts governor's council, a post he would hold until his death in 1706. He was buried in Barnstable's Lothrop Hill Cemetery, where later descendants placed a memorial marker in 1829.

== Family ==
Hinckley married twice; first on December 6, 1641 to Mary Richards, and again to Mary Glover (née Smith) of Dorchester, Massachusetts on March 15, 1659. He may have had as many as 17 children, a number of whom died young; different sources disagree on the exact number.

== See also ==
- List of colonial governors of Massachusetts
- Province of Massachusetts Bay

== Sources ==
- Goodwin, James (1888). The Pilgrim Republic: An Historical Review of the Colony of New Plymouth. Boston: Ticknor and Co. OCLC 3570931.
- Noyes, Charles P (1907). Noyes-Gilman Ancestry. New York: Gilliss Press. p. 314. OCLC 13174186.
- Putnam, Eben (July 1921). "Two Early Passenger Lists". New England Historical and Genealogical Register. 75 (3): 217–226.
