= Second Battle of Nipsachuck Battlefield =

- U.S. National Register of Historic Places
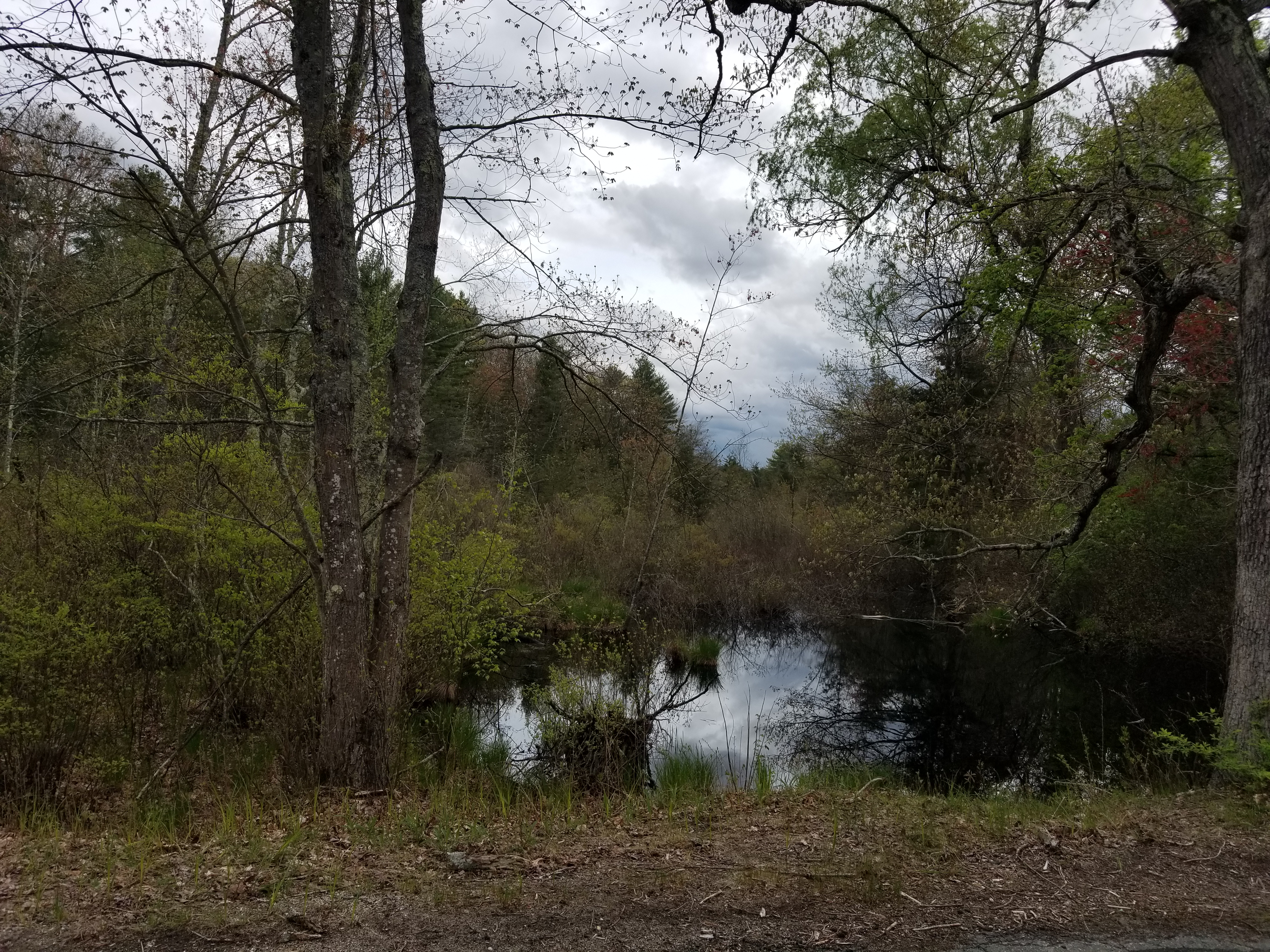
- Mattity Swamp as seen from Mattity Road in North Smithfield near the battlefield
- Location: North Smithfield, Rhode Island
- Area: 58.2 acres (23.6 ha)
- NRHP reference No.: 16000563
- Added to NRHP: August 22, 2016

The Second Battle of Nipsachuck Battlefield is a historic military site in North Smithfield, Rhode Island. A largely swampy terrain, it is the site of one of the last battles of King Philip's War to be fought in southern New England, on July 2, 1676. The battle is of interest to military historians because it included a rare use in the war of a cavalry charge by the English colonists. The site was listed on the National Register of Historic Places in 2016.

== Setting ==
The battle took place in a swampy area of what is now known as Mattity Swamp in North Smithfield, with a hill to its west and a few small rises of solid land within the swamp. The swamp was, at the time of the battle, described by chroniclers as "a great spruce swamp".

== History ==
Second Battle of Nipsachuck Battlefield
- Part of King Phillip's War
Date	Summer 1676
Location	Mattity Swamp, presently North Smithfield, Rhode Island
Result	Connecticut and Native allied victory

Belligerents
Narragansett	Connecticut; Pequot; Mohegan

Commanders and leaders
Quaiapen †; Stonewall John †	John Talcott

Strength
100 warriors	300 Connecticut Militia; 100 Native Warriors

By the summer of 1676, English colonists had gained the upper hand in King Philip's War, and the opposing American Indian tribes were generally in retreat. Many Narragansetts, based in southern Rhode Island, had fled to the Connecticut River valley after the Great Swamp Fight, a devastating assault on their central village by a combined English and Indian force in December 1675. In the summer of 1676, a band of approximately 100 Narragansetts led by female sachem Quaiapen returned to northern Rhode Island, apparently seeking to recover cached seed corn for planting.

The Narragansetts were attacked by a force of 400 led by John Talcott, composed of 300 Connecticut colonial militia and about 100 Mohegan and Pequot warriors. The attacking forces had scouted the Narragansett position at the western edge of the swamp, and organized an attack over and around the hill to the west. A portion of the Connecticut militia were mounted dragoons, and the battle is believed to be one of the few in the war in which such forces actually saw mounted combat. The Narragansetts were driven into the swamp where many were killed, including Queen Magnus (Quaiapen) and Pessicus' messenger, Watawaikeson (Tiawakesson) and Stonewall John, the builder of Queen's Fort. Quaiapen's death spelled the end of organized Narragansett opposition in the conflict. According to Major Talcott, at "Nipsachooke" his forces "within 3 hours slew and tooke prisoners 171, of which 45 being women and children that ye Indians saved alive, and the others slayne; in which engagement were slayne 34 men, took 15 armes." Many of the survivors were captured and tried, and then publicly executed or sold.

== Archaeology ==
Due to the poor swampy quality of the terrain, the battlefield area has escaped significant development, with only modest agricultural uses around its edges, and some residential development in the same areas. Archaeological investigation by the National Park Service of the site has yielded Narragansett domestic objects as well as lead shot, musket balls, a horseshoe, a bridle rosette, and other military artifacts.

== See also ==
- National Register of Historic Places listings in Providence County, Rhode Island
