= Quaiapen =

Narragansett-Niantic female sachem (d. 1676)

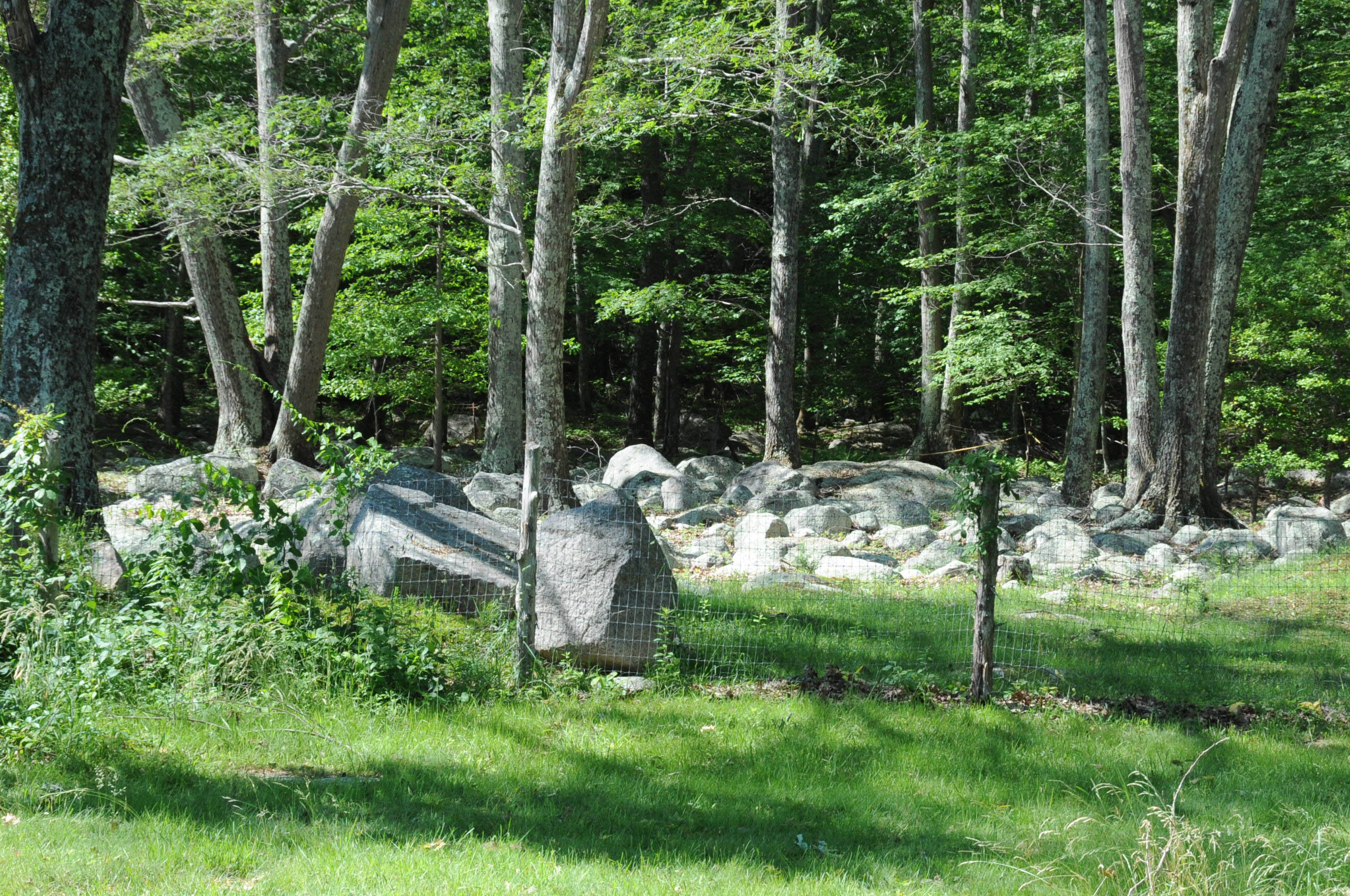
Queen Quaiapen's stone fort (Queen's Fort) in Exeter

Quaiapen (c. 1603 – July 2, 1676), also known as Magnus, Matantuck, Old Queen, or Watowswokotaus, was a Narragansett-Niantic female sachem (saunkskwa) who was the last sachem captured or killed during King Philip’s War.

== Early leadership and family ==
Quaiapen was the sister of Ninigret and Wepitanock, and in 1630 she married the eldest son of her uncle Canonicus, Mriksah, known as Mixan (or Mexanno). After Mixan died in 1657, Quaiapen took control of his lands around Cocumscussoc. Quaiapen and Mixan had at least three children, a daughter Quinimiquet, and sons, Quequakanewett and Scuttup. Quaiapen had another daughter, Mary Oskoosooduck, possibly with the Eastern Pequot leader Mamoho, and this daughter married Ninigret II, Ninigret's eldest son.

In 1667, Quaiapen and Ninigret waged an effort opposing Metacom’s goal of forming an alliance between the Wampanoag and Nipmucks, and she sent warriors to fight the Quinnatisset Nipmuck. John Eliot attempted to mediate a dispute regarding a tribute between the Quantisset Nipmucs and Quaiapin.

== King Philip's War and death ==
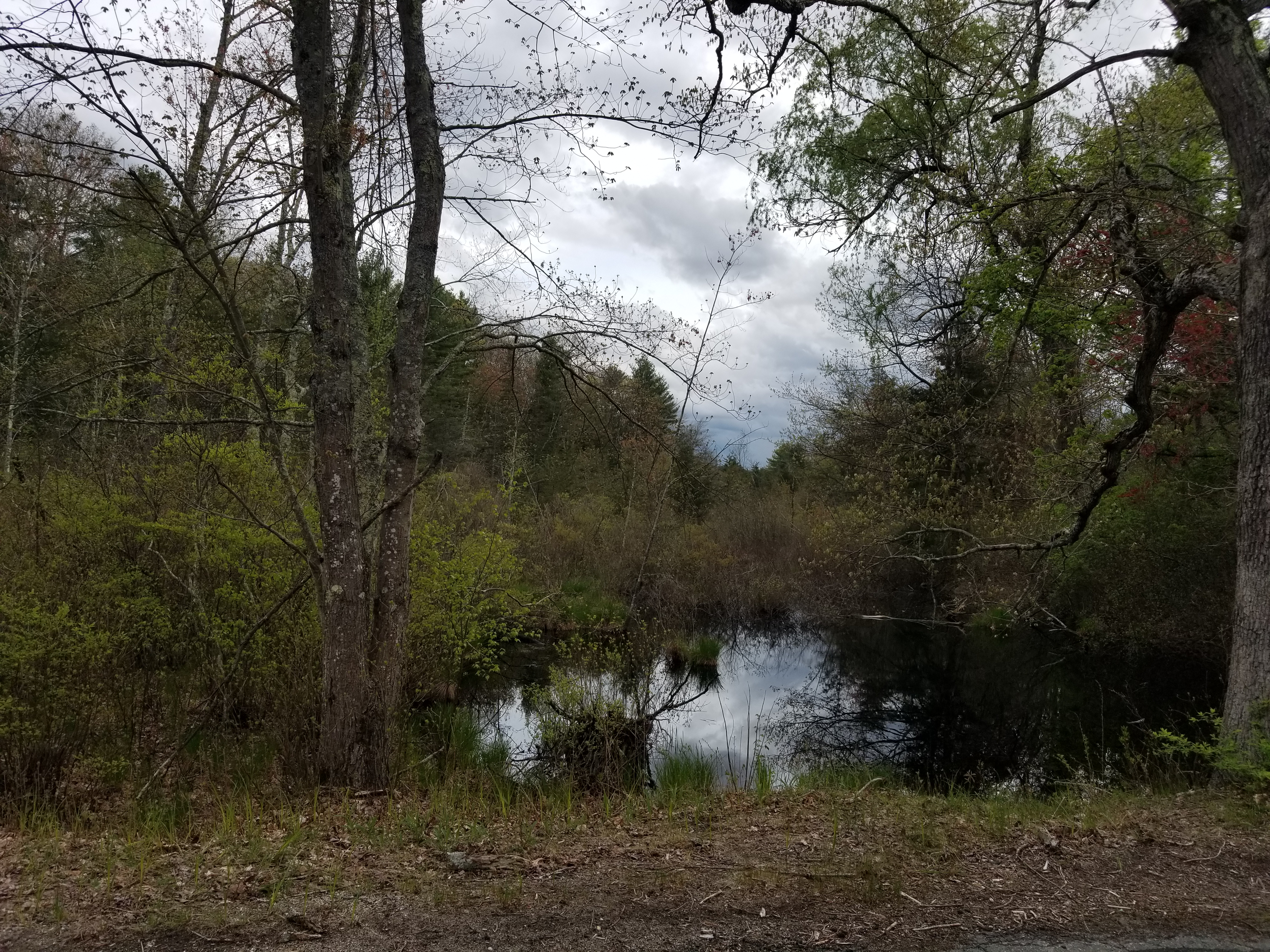
Swamp near the location Quaiapen's death in the Second Battle of Nipsachuck in what is now North Smithfield

In June of 1675 Quaiapen and several other Narragansetts, including Ninigret, Quinnapin, and Quaunochu, reached an agreement at Worden Pond with the colonial authorities not to ally with the Wampanoag King Philip and to deliver him to the English if Philip sought refuge with the Narragansetts. Despite the agreement, war broke out, and after the Great Swamp Massacre in December of 1675, many Narragansetts including Quaiapen retreated to southern swamps and the Connecticut River valley. Quaiapen also likely spent time in Queen's Fort on what is now the Exeter–North Kingstown line, which was a place where she had resided.

In the summer of 1676, Quaiapen went with one hundred Narragansetts to northern Rhode Island to recover caches of planting corn. While there, the Connecticut militia with three hundred colonial troops and one hundred Mohegan and Pequot soldiers attacked Quaiapen's group in the Second Battle of Nipsachuck in what is now North Smithfield. Quaiapen, her advisor Stonewall John, and many others were killed by Major John Talcott's forces while seeking refuge in a swamp. A history of the War published in 1676 stated: "In June Major Talbot flew and took Captive Four and Twenty of the Enemies in one Weeks Time, and also killed the Old Queen of Narraganset." In his July 4, 1676 letter Major Talcott reported how his forces surrounded the great spruce swamp at "Nipachooke" where that "ould piece of venum, Sunck squaw Magnus was slaine."
