= Quinnapin =

Narragansett leader (died 1676)

Quinnapin (also known as Quawnipund, Quanopen and Sowagonish) (died 1676) was a Narragansett leader during King Philip's War.

Quinnapin was the son of Cojonoquond and nephew of Miantonomoh. Quanopen was married to three different women, Onux, Weetamoo and an unknown younger woman who was the mother of Weecum and Tuspaquin. In 1676 Quanopen and Weetamoo held Mary Rowlandson captive for a period before she was redeemed.

In June 1675 Quinnapin, Quaiapen, and other Narragansett leaders met with colonial authorities at Worden Pond and agreed not to join with King Philip. During the Great Swamp Fight in 1675 Quanopen fought with his cousin Canonchet and later attacked William Carpenter's home at Pawtuxet, and fought at Nashaway. Quinnapin was eventually captured by colonial forces and convicted and executed on August 6, 1676, in Newport, Rhode Island.
