= Albert S. Potter Octagon House =

Historic house in Rhode Island, United States

- U.S. Historic district – Contributing property
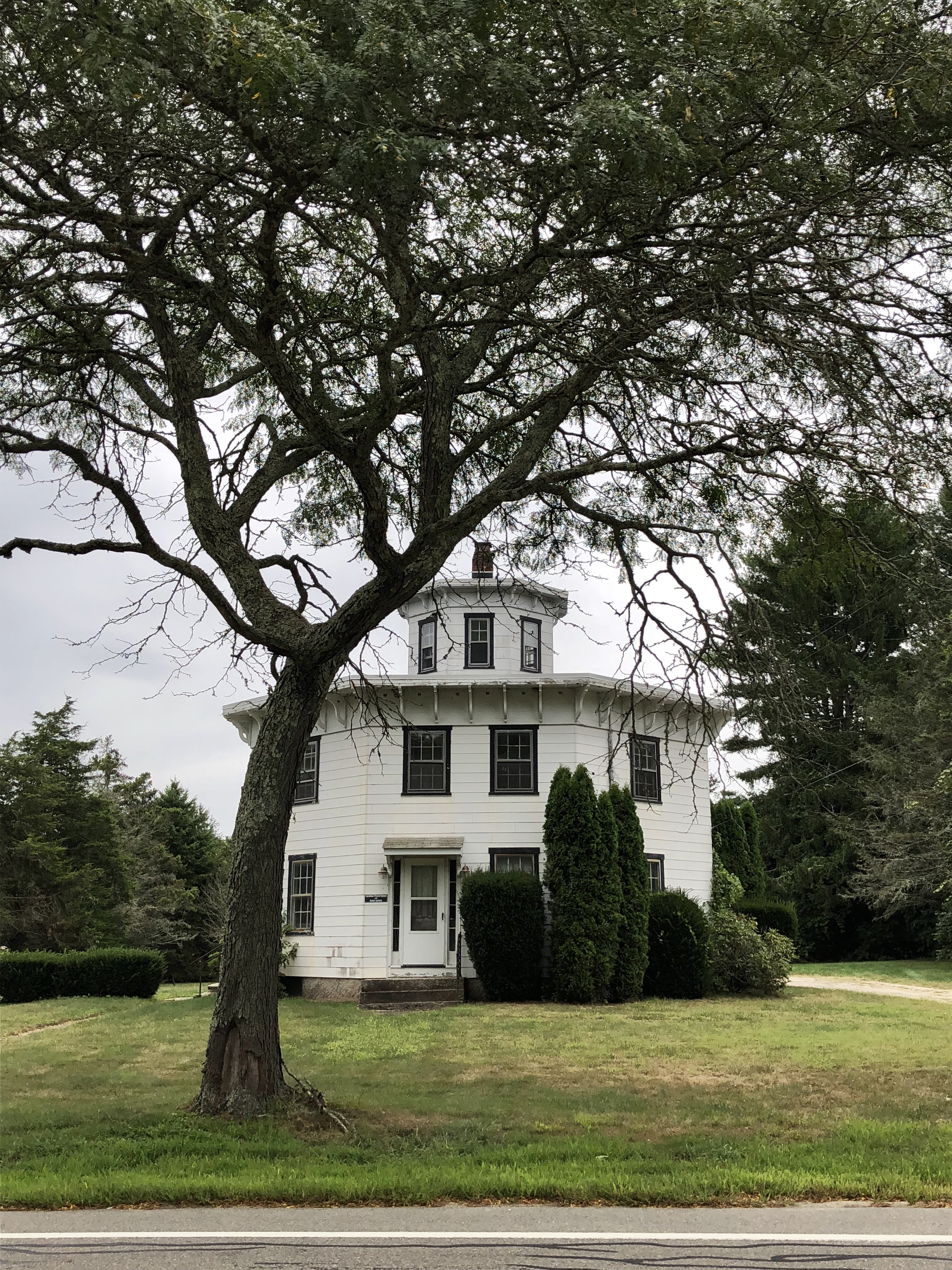
- Location: 4 Carolina Main St. Richmond, Rhode Island
- Coordinates: 41°27′47.7″N 71°39′41.6″W
- Built: 1857
- Architectural style: Octagon Mode
- Part of: Carolina Village Historic District (ID74000009)
- Added to NRHP: May 2, 1974

The Albert S. Potter Octagon House (also known simply as the Octagon House) is an historic octagonal house located at 4 Carolina Main Street (Rhode Island Route 112) on the corner of Shannock Hill Road in the village of Carolina in Richmond, Rhode Island. It was built by watchmaker Albert S. Potter in 1857. Potter reportedly did his watchmaking in the octagonal cupola atop the two-story house. The building is now covered with asbestos siding and is owned by the Carolina Preservation and Band Society.

The Albert S. Potter Octagon House is a contributing property in the Carolina Village Historic District, which was added to the National Register of Historic Places on May 2, 1974.
