= William Bradford (Plymouth soldier) =

American political and military leader (1624–1703)

Major William Bradford

Deputy Governor of Plymouth Colony
- In office 1682–1686
- Monarch: Charles II
- Governor: Thomas Hinckley
- Preceded by: James Cudworth
- Succeeded by: Dominion of New England
- In office 1689–1692
- Monarchs: James II; William III and Mary II
- Governor: Thomas Hinckley
- Preceded by: Dominion of New England
- Succeeded by: Province of Massachusetts Bay

Personal details
- Born: 17 June 1624 Plymouth, Plymouth Colony, British America
- Died: 20 February 1703 (aged 78)
- Resting place: Plymouth, Province of Massachusetts Bay, British America
- Children: 15

Major William Bradford (a.k.a. William Bradford IV and William Bradford the Younger; 17 June 1624 – 20 February 1703) was a political and military leader in Plymouth Colony in the late 17th century.

== Early life ==
Coat of Arms of William Bradford

Major Bradford was the son of Governor William Bradford and his second wife, Alice Carpenter Southworth. Born four years after the Pilgrims arrival in 1620, William was his father's second child, but the first born in the new world. His older half-brother John Bradford had been left behind in Leiden, Netherlands.

== Military service ==
Bradford was commissioned as the ensign (3rd in command) of the Plymouth militia company on 7 March 1648. He held this position until he was promoted to lieutenant on 2 October 1659.

He was commissioned as the major-commandant of the Plymouth Colony militia regiment on 3 June 1673. He succeeded newly elected Governor Josiah Winslow who held the position since it was established in 1658.

He held the rank of major in the militia and was the commander of the military forces of Plymouth Colony during the King Philip's War. He commanded the Plymouth Regiment, consisting of two companies, at the Great Swamp Fight, in South Kingstown, Rhode Island, on 19 December 1675. During the battle, his eye was wounded and he was hit by a musket ball which he carried in his body to his grave.

== Political service ==
He later served as the deputy governor of Plymouth Colony under Governor Thomas Hinckley from 1682 to 1686 and from 1689 to 1692 when the colony was merged with the Massachusetts Bay Colony to form the Province of Massachusetts Bay. Bradford was suspended from office during the governorship of Sir Edmund Andros from 20 December 1686 to 18 April 1689.

== Family ==
Major Bradford was married three times (1st: Alice Richards; 2nd: Sarah –, widow of Francis Griswold; 3rd: Mary Atwood, widow of John Holmes) and fathered fifteen children from the three marriages.

== Burial ==
He is buried in the Burial Hill Cemetery in Plymouth, near the grave of his father.

== See also ==
- Descendants of William Bradford (Plymouth governor)
