= Queen's Fort =

Coordinates: 41°35′35″N 71°31′23″W

- U.S. National Register of Historic Places
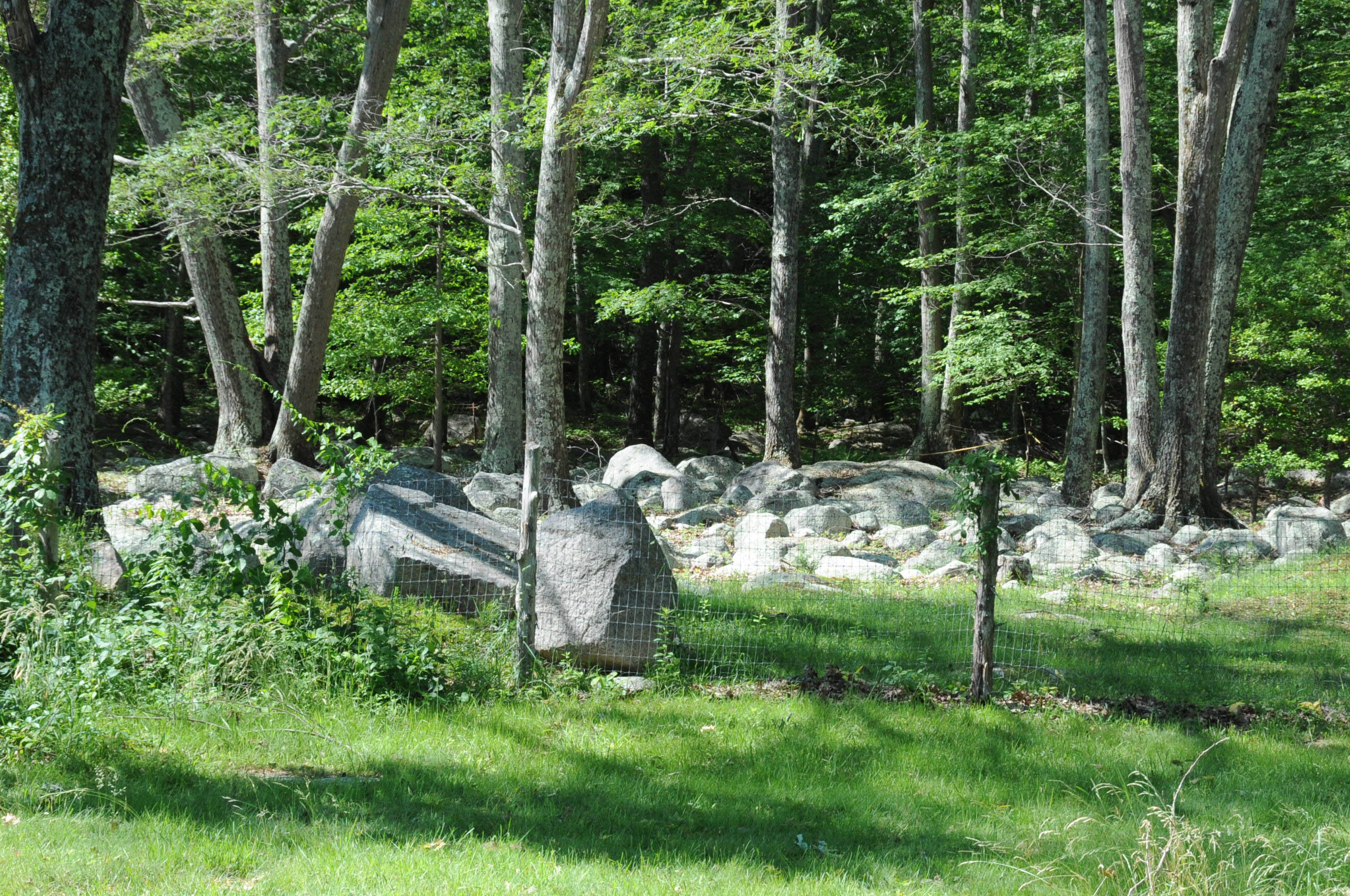

- Location within Rhode Island Location within the United States
- Location: Exeter, Rhode Island
- NRHP reference No.: 80000024
- Added to NRHP: November 26, 1980

Queen's Fort is a historic site in Exeter, Rhode Island. A round, rocky hillock, the site has long been described as the site of a Native American fortification constructed before 1676 by Queen Quaiapen and members of the Narragansett Indian Tribe who survived the Great Swamp Massacre.

The fort's layout included an eastern bastion and a flanking wall built amongst large naturally occurring boulders. The fort was described as containing an enclosed chamber as well:

Within the fort a chamber – six square feet with a seven-foot ceiling and a sand floor – was perhaps built for the Narragansett queen Quaiapen (also called Matuntuck). She supposedly hid out at the site during King Phililp’s War before moving somewhere else, where she died. Some have also suspected that Quaiapen and Stonewall John were lovers."

The fort was known for the skill of its design, which used naturally occurring boulders connected with laid stone walls. Admiring colonists created the mistaken rumor that Stonewall John was an escaped English engineer.

The fort was described in conflicting Victorian-era accounts, and the rocky nature of the site prevented its reuse. The site has been owned by the Rhode Island Historical Society since 1931 and was listed on the National Register of Historic Places in 1980.

== See also ==
- National Register of Historic Places listings in Washington County, Rhode Island
