= John Hoxsie House =

Historic house in Rhode Island, United States

- U.S. National Register of Historic Places
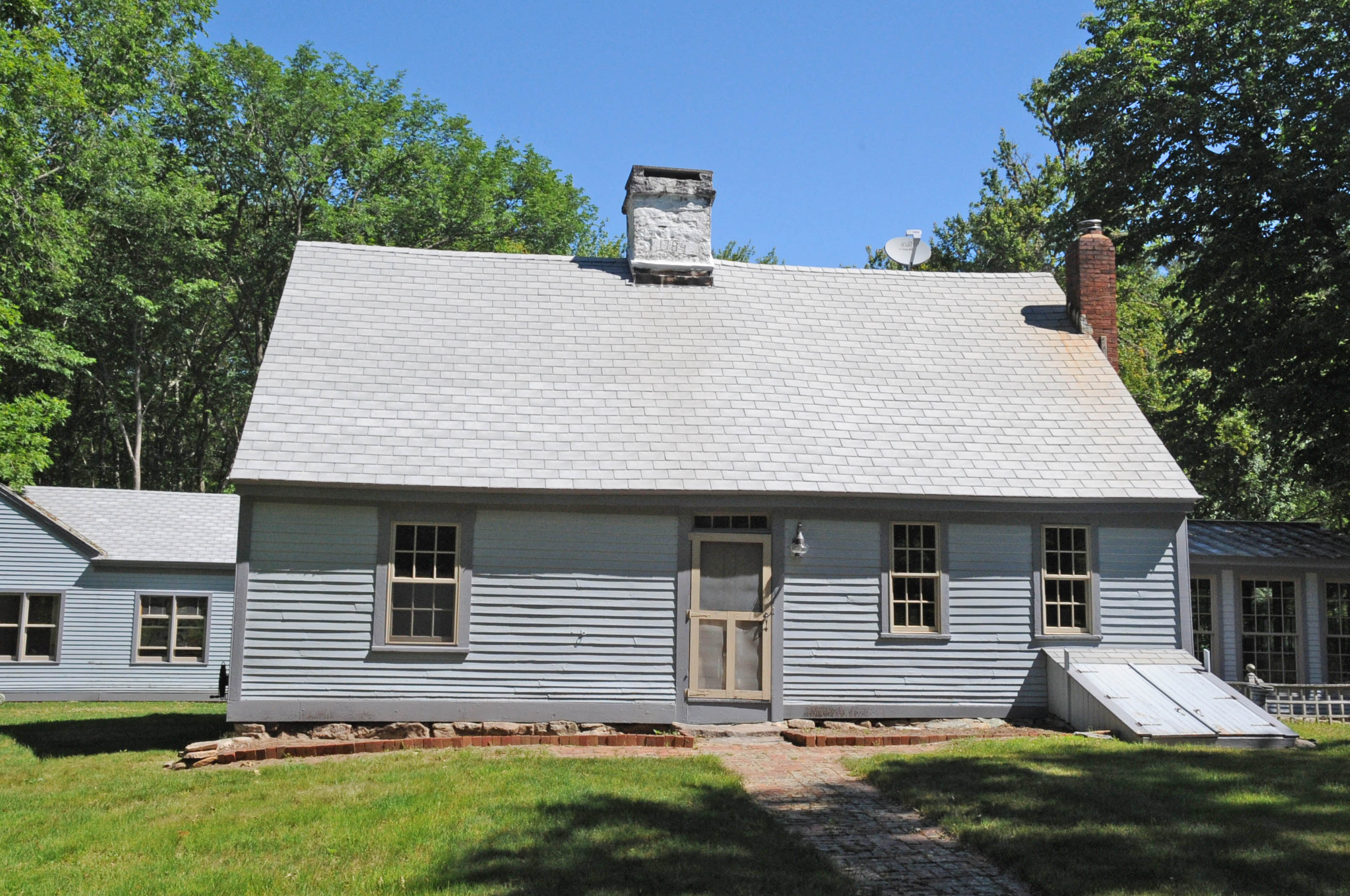

- Location within Rhode Island Location within the United States
- Nearest city: Richmond, Rhode Island
- Coordinates: 41°28′34″N 71°38′49″W
- Area: 60 acres (24 ha)
- Built: 1784
- Architect: John Hoxsie
- NRHP reference No.: 78000016
- Added to NRHP: May 5, 1978

The John Hoxsie House, also known as the Old Kenyon Farm, is an historic farmstead in Richmond, Rhode Island. The farm is a 60-acre (24 ha) parcel of land accessed via a long private drive on the east side of Richmond Town House Road (Rhode Island Route 112), just north of Pinecrest Road, and is a rare, virtually intact, example of a 19th-century farmstead. The main house, a 1 1/2-story Cape style structure, was built in 1784 by John Hoxsie.

The property was listed on the National Register of Historic Places in 1978.

== See also ==
- National Register of Historic Places listings in Washington County, Rhode Island
