= James Avery (American colonist) =

Cornish-American landowner, legislator and military captain

Captain James Avery
- Bust of James Avery
- Born: 1620; Cornwall, England
- Died: April 18, 1700 (aged 79–80); Groton, Connecticut, U.S.
- Monuments: Avery Memorial, in the city of Groton, Connecticut
- Occupations: Lieutenant, Captain, Landowner
- Spouse: Joanna Greenslade

James Avery, also known with his honorary title as Captain James Avery (1620 – April 18, 1700), was a Cornish-American landowner, legislator, and a military captain in King Philip's War. He is commonly known to be the founder of a clan or family, commonly known as the "Groton Avery's". Although he was born in Cornwall in 1620, he grew up and lived in the Massachusetts Bay for the majority of his life.

== Biography ==
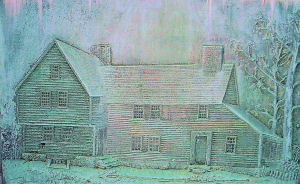
The original home of the Avery family, built in the year 1656. Also referred to as "The Hive", and was passed down through many generations, until the home burned down on July 20, 1894.

Captain James Avery was born in 1620 in the county of Cornwall, and was the son of Christopher Avery. James Avery was baptized at a small village named Wolborough, in the county of Devon on April 22, 1621. In 1630 or 1631, he sailed with his father to America, and resided with him in Gloucester, Massachusetts for several years. James was the only child of Christopher and Margaret Avery, who never came to New England. In fact, she died in 1626, and Christopher Avery married Alice Berdon in 1630 in England. Despite this, Christopher left Alice behind in England, never to return. On November 10, 1643, James was officially married to a woman named Joanna.

James Avery was an early land owner at Gloucester. He went to Pequot, now New London, Connecticut, and purchased land there, returned to Gloucester, sold his possessions to his father in 1651, and returned to New London in the March of that year. In the New London Book of Grants, is a record of the various parcels given to James Avery. At the same time, he was given sixteen acres of upland, and in 1661, he received twenty acres of upland. Two years later, he sold his land in the first division to Mr. Blinman. Later that year, he was granted a farm in South Groton but he continued to live with his family on the west side of the great river. In 1653, he secured another farm, one of the "Pocketannock grants", further up the river in what is now the town of Ledyard. About 1656 he built and occupied "The Hive of the Averys".

He was Deputy to the General Court of Connecticut 12 times from 1656 to 1680. He also served for 20 years as a town selectman.

James Avery soon became active in military affairs and is generally spoken of by the title of ensign, lieutenant, or captain. In 1665, he was appointed a lieutenant, and in 1673, a captain. During the Indian wars around New London, Captain James Avery led troops, among who were James Avery Jr., John Avery, Thomas Avery, Ephraim Avery. Of the many wars they fought was the King Philip's War, and the French and Indian Wars. On November 25, 1675, Capt. Avery was appointed by the council fifth in command of the United Army which is to go against the Indians. (Conn. Col. Rec. 2:386). These actions culminated in the Great Swamp Fight in December 1675 in which Captain Avery participated.

The Pequot allies were under the command of James Avery. The able Pequot tribe that, a few years before, had been almost exterminated by the English. The Pequot Fort, taken in 1637 by Capt. John Mason in command of the Connecticut troops and their Mohegan and Narragansett allies, was on the Mystic River, on the eastern line of Groton.

The fair disposition and judicial temperament of James Avery are here clearly shown-qualities that doubtless gave him much of the great influence that we know he possessed with the friendly Indians of that region. For several years, the commissioners of the United Colonies of New England referred almost everything relating to the Pequots to Messrs. Denison, Stanton and Avery for adjustment. In 1668, James Avery and Cary Lathem were chosen to settle the boundary line with the sachem (chief), Uncas. For his services James Avery received many parcels of land and was often called for by the town and by individuals in the settling of such controversies. In 1678, the commissioners granted Captain Avery five pounds "for his good service in assisting in the government of the Pequots for sundry years".

James Avery was as prominent in the civil matters of town and colony as he was in military affairs. Sept. 28, 1669, a list of the names of the freemen of New London was made by order of the general court and on this list the name of James Auerye stands first.

At Pequot, Captain Avery seemed to have taken at once an active part in private affairs. For many years his name was signed to deeds and grants of land, as commissioner for New London. He was appointed commissioner Oct. 8, 1663 and from that time until 1695 served continuously as one of the judges of the county court. The years 1671 and 1673 were the only years in which he did not serve. In 1871 a publication came out that of 545 representatives of the town Groton, 104 were descendants of Captain James Avery.

After the accession of William and Mary in 1688, Connecticut called it's general court together without waiting for instructions from the home government. Among the few determined men who responded and served through 1689 was Capt. James Avery of New London. For the twenty years James Avery served as deputy, the general court passed several laws beneficial to the Connecticut Colony. The Indians were defeated or pacified and Connecticut gained control over the regional indigenous tribes.

James Avery was prominent in matters relating to the church and the references to him in such connection are numerous. The church record kept by the Rev. Mr. Bradstreet begins October 5, 1670, the day of ordination. It opens with the following: "Members of the church, Lieutenant James Avery and. wife, Thomas Miner and wife, James Morgan, senior and wife."

In his famous diary, Thomas Minor makes frequent reference to James Avery with whom he was to be connected by the marriage of three of his children. James Avery was expected to watch the spiritual interests of the church. There was then a close union between church and state, each being a part of the other. The Congregational church was fully "established" wholly it orthodox", and the only one recognized by law. The minister's salary was raised by public tax. As early as 1678, the people on the east side of the great river (Thames), through James Avery, petitioned the general court for a church and minister of their own. In 1687, after persistent petitionings in which James Avery was prominent, it was ordered that for the future they should have liberty to invite the minister of the town to preach m their side of the river every third Sabbath during the four most inclement months of the year.

The work that he had thus begun was continued by his sons and, in 1702, the church on the east side of the river for which he had so long labored became a reality. Although he did not live to see the happy termination of his endeavor, he is justly considered me of the founders of the First Church of Groton. In the two hundred years since then four buildings have housed the organization. The fourth was completed in 1902. Its walls are built of field stone gathered from the many Avery and other farms in Groton. The memorial window in the front of the church, is dedicated, by his descendants, to Captain James Avery, in whose active brain originated the idea of a church organization east of the "Great River."

== Final years and death ==
In 1693, James Avery made preparation for having a comfortable elderly age. He deeded his land to each of his sons, but he made a final provision as his deed shows: "that I the said James Avery senior, do reserve the north end of the dwelling house during my life and the life of my wife Johanna Avery and also the full moitey or one half part of the neat product or increase of all the land during my life and the life of my wife Johanna Avery." Johanna was the mother of all the children of James Avery. This will was dated May 6, 1693. Thus we can know for sure that his wife Johanna was living in 1693, but to this day, the date of her death is not known. James Avery died on April 18, 1700, and was buried in the Avery-Morgan cemetery.

== Descendants ==
Avery has thousands of living descendants. Among his descendants are John D. Rockefeller Sr. and Jr. Governor and Vice President Nelson Rockefeller, American Senator Jay Rockefeller, Canadian Academy Award-winning screenwriter & director Roger Avary,
