= Carolina, Rhode Island =

Census-designated place in Rhode Island, United States

- Carolina Village Historic District
- U.S. National Register of Historic Places
- U.S. Historic district
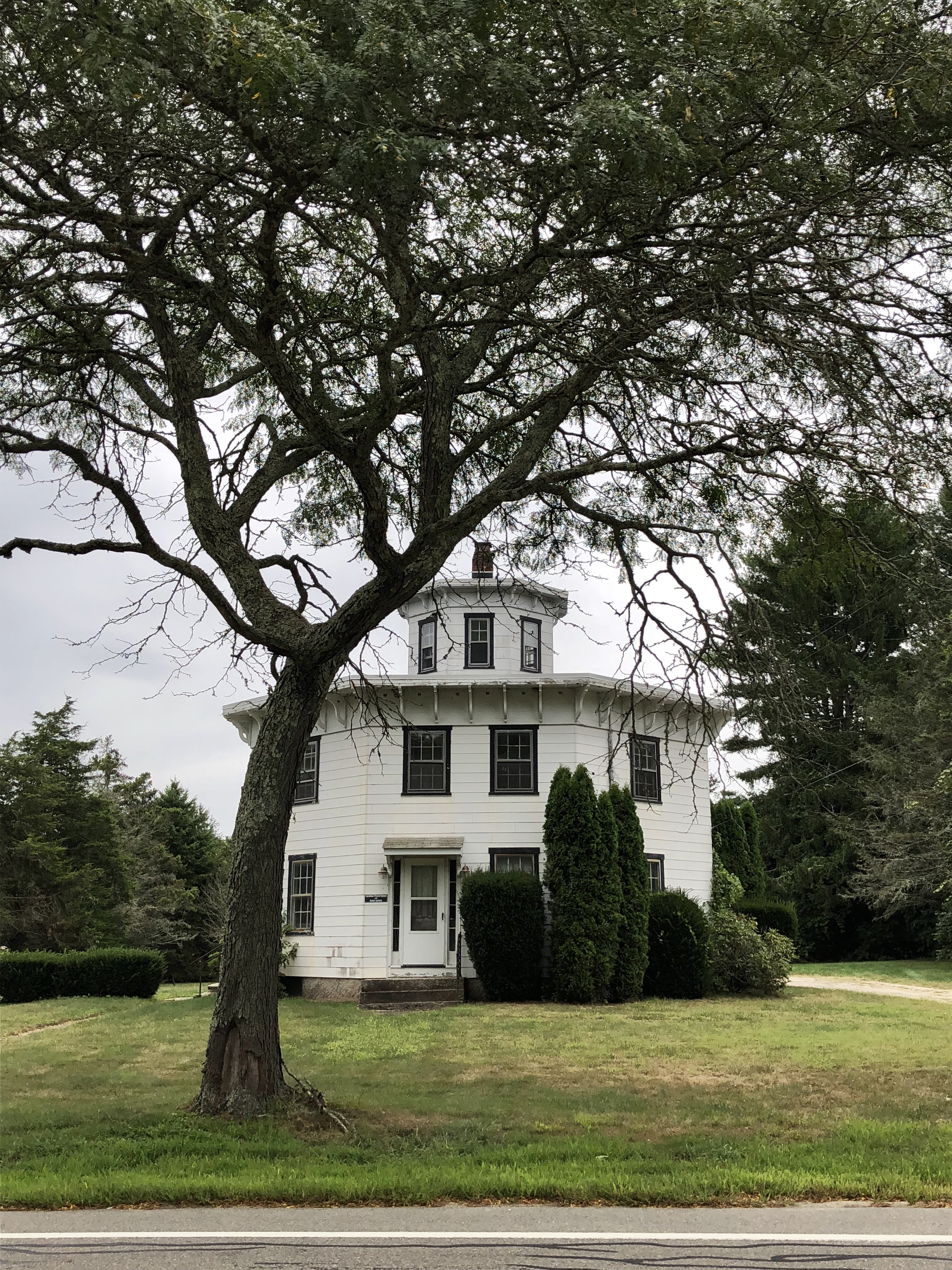
- Albert S. Potter Octagon House (1867)

- Location within Rhode Island Location within the United States
- Location: Charlestown and Richmond, Rhode Island
- Coordinates: 41°27′31″N 71°39′51″W
- Architectural style: Greek Revival, Italianate, Queen Anne
- NRHP reference No.: 74000009
- Added to NRHP: May 2, 1974

Carolina is a village that straddles the border of the towns of Charlestown and Richmond on the Pawcatuck River in Washington County, Rhode Island, United States. Rhode Island Route 112 passes through the village. Carolina is identified as a census-designated place, with a population of 970 at the 2010 census.

== Overview ==
The Carolina Village Historic District was listed on the National Register of Historic Places in 1974. It includes examples of Greek Revival, Italianate, and Queen Anne style. It comprises 71 properties over an area of 115 acres (0.47 km^{2}), including a former mill complex and nearby residences. It encompasses properties along Carolina Main Street and Carolina Back Road and their vicinity between Pine Hill Road and Alton-Carolina Road (Route 91), including houses along Butter Lane, Tall Pines Drive, Schoolhouse Lane, Carolina Mill Lane, and Downs Court.

== History ==
In 1802, the first wooden dam and a gristmill were built on the river at the site of the village, which was then known as Nichols Bridge. A few years later, a cotton mill was established, with production buildings mostly located in Richmond and some employee housing located across the river in Charlestown. Rowland G. Hazard bought the mill in 1843 and renamed it the Carolina Mills Company in honor of his wife Caroline Newbold Hazard of South Kingstown. The village around the mill was also given the same name. The Rhode Island Historic Preservation Commission described 19th-century Carolina as a "center for the surrounding area, including a school, a church, a post office, a bank, several stores, a blacksmith shop, and halls for meetings, lectures, and 'entertainments'." The local post office was named "Carolina Mills" from 1850 until 1879, when it was renamed "Carolina."

In 1862, the complex switched from cotton textile production to production of woolens. The Hazard family operated the mill complex until 1863, when they leased it to T.R. Hyde & Co., which was a partnership between Thomas R. Hyde and Rowland Hazard II that operated the mill until 1868. The mill was sold to new owners in 1869, but Rowland Hazard II operated it as a lessee until at least 1877. The mill complex operated until 1930 or 1935.

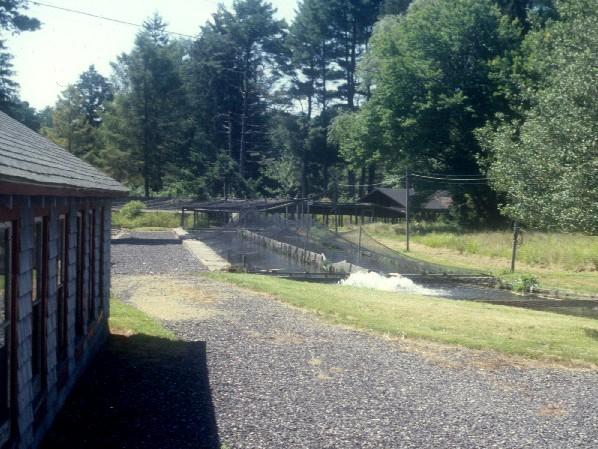
Raceways for trout and a fish hatchery house at the American Fish Culture Company, Carolina, Rhode Island in 1994

The mill complex deteriorated after its closure, and Carolina became a residential community. However, other components of the village remained intact and it was listed on the National Register in 1974. The portion of Carolina village which is located in the town of Richmond includes a corridor of about two dozen 1-story and 1½-story cottages and other domestic buildings built between about 1840 and 1870. Other buildings of historic interest include the remains of the mill; the Carolina School, built in 1845; the Carolina Free Will Baptist Church, built in 1845 and relocated in 1865; the octagonal Albert Potter House, built in 1867; and a 2½-story Queen Anne style house built by Ellison Tinkham, who was one of the owners of the mills from 1868 until 1907.

Carolina was also the site of one of the first trout farms in America. John W. Hoxie established the Clearwater Trout Farm in 1877 on White Brook on land leased from Rowland G. Hazard, north of the village center. Two years later, Hoxie's brother Charles established his own White Brook Trout Hatchery on an adjacent plot of land along the brook. By 1892, the White Brook Trout Hatchery was incorporated as the American Fish Culture Company with Rowland Hazard II as a minority shareholder. The Hazard family gained controlling interest in the corporation in 1899. Upon the death of John W. Hoxie in 1903, the R. Hazard Estate acquired full interest in Clearwater Trout Farm, and both farms were eventually merged and operated as American Fish Culture Company by the Hazard Family until its sale to the State of Rhode Island in 1995. By the early 1920s, American Fish Culture Company was considered to be the largest fish farm in America.

== Geography ==
According to the United States Census Bureau, the Carolina CDP has a total area of 2.48 square miles (6.43 km^{2}), of which 2.46 square miles (6.37 km^{2}) is land and 0.02 square miles (0.05 km^{2}) (0.85%) is water. Carolina has its own zip code, 02812, but only the Richmond side is serviced by the Carolina post office despite the post office building being located in Charlestown.

== Demographics ==
=== 2020 census ===
The 2020 United States census counted 924 people, 382 households, and 245 families in Carolina. The population density was 375.5 per square mile (145.0/km^{2}). There were 397 housing units at an average density of 161.3 per square mile (62.3/km^{2}). The racial makeup was 90.26% (834) white or European American (89.61% non-Hispanic white), 0.87% (8) black or African-American, 0.22% (2) Native American or Alaska Native, 1.3% (12) Asian, 0.0% (0) Pacific Islander or Native Hawaiian, 0.32% (3) from other races, and 7.03% (65) from two or more races. Hispanic or Latino of any race was 2.16% (20) of the population.

Of the 382 households, 31.4% had children under the age of 18; 47.4% were married couples living together; 23.8% had a female householder with no spouse or partner present. 26.4% of households consisted of individuals and 10.2% had someone living alone who was 65 years of age or older. The average household size was 2.7 and the average family size was 3.2. The percent of those with a bachelor's degree or higher was estimated to be 19.6% of the population.

19.3% of the population was under the age of 18, 8.4% from 18 to 24, 16.1% from 25 to 44, 33.0% from 45 to 64, and 23.2% who were 65 years of age or older. The median age was 48.4 years. For every 100 females, the population had 76.0 males. For every 100 females ages 18 and older, there were 75.1 males.

The 2016–2020 5-year American Community Survey estimates show that the median household income was $89,375 (with a margin of error of +/- $41,791) and the median family income was $113,456 (+/- $35,725). Males had a median income of $56,490 (+/- $8,621) versus $38,050 (+/- $35,159) for females. The median income for those above 16 years old was $53,582 (+/- $7,053). Approximately, 0.0% of families and 2.0% of the population were below the poverty line, including 0.0% of those under the age of 18 and 0.0% of those ages 65 or over.

== See also ==
- National Register of Historic Places listings in Washington County, Rhode Island
