= Stonewall John =

Narragansett leader

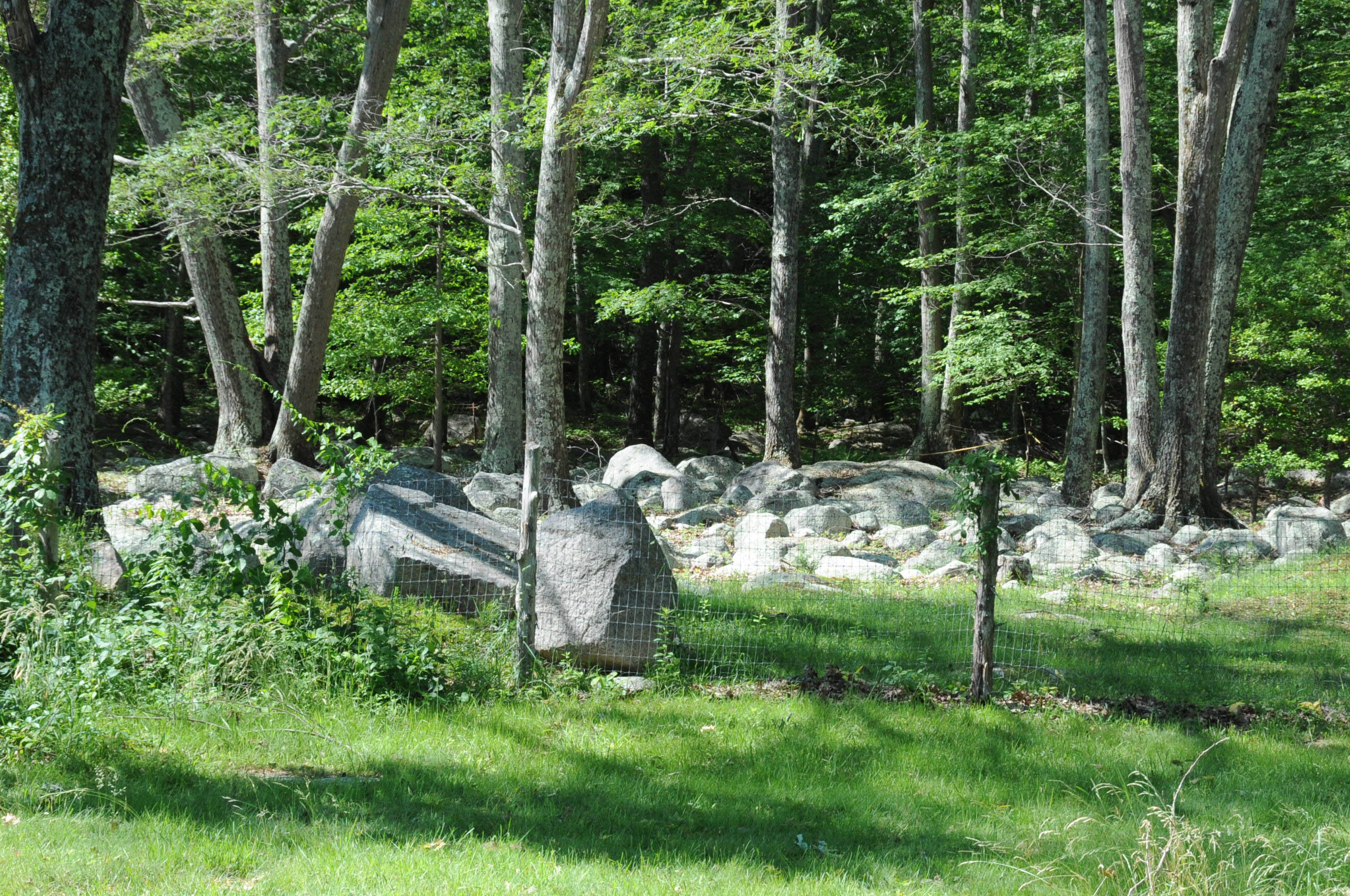
Remains of stonewalls constructed by Stonewall John at Queen's Fort in Exeter

Stonewall John (also known as Nawham or Nawwhun and John Wall-Maker and Stonelayer John) (died July 2, 1676) was a seventeenth century Narragansett leader in Rhode Island who was a skilled stone mason and blacksmith often credited with building stone wall fortifications at Queen's Fort in Exeter and Stony Fort, and blockhouses at the Great Swamp Fort.

== Early career as a mason and blacksmith ==
Early in his life Stonewall John purportedly worked for Richard Smith who had a trading post in what is now Wickford, Rhode Island. Stonewall John was possibly in a relationship with or served as a close advisor to Queen Quaiapen, and he was thought to have built the stonewall fortifications connecting large glacial boulders at Queen's Fort at the start of King Philip's War in the 1670s. Stonewall John is also credited with stonework completed at nearby Stony Fort. Some sources incorrectly claimed that Stonewall John may have been English due to his technological sophistication, but most sources disagree. Stone masonry was actually common among the Narragansetts who were described by one source as "an active, laborious and ingenious people, which is demonstrated in their labors they do for the English; of whom more are employed, especially in making stone fences and many other hard labors, than of ay other Indian people or neighbors." In addition to being a mason, Stonewall John was a "skilled... blacksmith who had built a forge inside the Narragansetts' Great Swamp village."

== King Philip's War ==
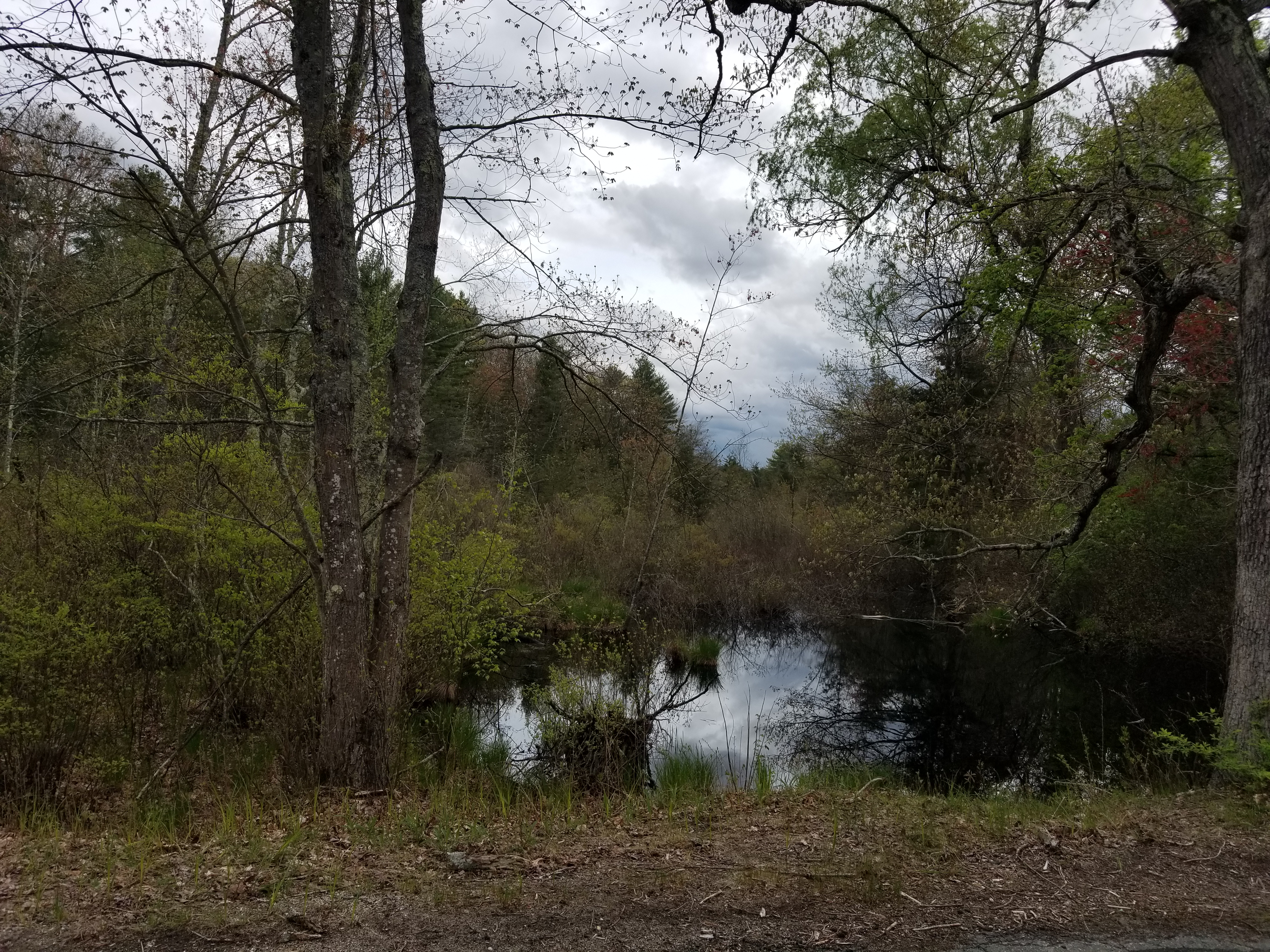
Swamp near the location Quaiapen's death in the Second Battle of Nipsachuck in what is now North Smithfield

On December 15, 1675, prior to the Great Swamp Fight, Stonewall John attempted to negotiate a peace with the militia forces, but the militia leaders suspected he was actually spying on their forces or distracting them, so they requested to speak to the higher sachems instead. Within minutes of his departure the Indians began attacking the militia troops from behind a stone wall and four days later, the Great Swamp Fight occurred nearby. Stonewall John "escaped from the [Great Swamp] fort after its devastation in December 1675, but his forge was destroyed." He participated in the March 1676 attacks on Rehoboth and Providence.

While evacuating from Providence, Roger Williams encountered a group of Narragansett warriors about to raid the settlement, including Stonewall John. On April 1, 1676 a letter often attributed to Williams described the encounter:

"Then Came one Nawham Mr R. Smiths John Wall Maker an Ingenious Fellow and peaseable...Nawwhun Said that we broke Articles and not they (as I alleadged). He said they Heartilie Endeavoured the Surrendr of the Prisoners. They were abroad in Hunting, at Home. They were Divided and could not Effect it. He said You have driven us out of our own Countrie and then pursued us to Great Miserie, and Your own, and we are Forced to live upon you."

A history of the War published in 1676 stated that the Stonewall John was "an arch Villain....that had been with them at the sacking of Providence, famously known by the name of Stone-wall, or Stone-Layer John, for that being an active and ingenious Fellow, he had learnt the Mason's Trade and was of great use to the Indians in building their Forts, &c." On July 2, 1676, Indian soldiers in the Connecticut militia led by John Talcott killed Stonewall John, along with Queen Quaiapen and many others, at the Second Battle of Nipsachuck Battlefield in a swamp in what is now North Smithfield, Rhode Island.
