= John Talcott =

John Talcott (December 18, 1630 – July 23, 1688) was a politician and military leader in early colonial Connecticut.

== Early life and career ==
Coat of Arms of John Talcott

John Talcott was born Braintree, Essex, England in 1630 to John Talcott and Dorothy Mott. In 1632 the family immigrated to Cambridge, Massachusetts in 1632 and then moved to Hartford, Connecticut in 1636. In Connecticut Talcott was elected as assistant magistrate in 1654 and then a deputy (representative, serving from 1660 to 1661. He then served as treasurer of the colony from 1660 to 1676.

== Military Career and Service during King Philip's War ==
Talcott began service in the Connecticut militia as an ensign in 1650 and then was eventually promoted to captain in 1660, major in 1673, and then lieutenant-colonel. During King Philip’s War, he commanded a joint militia force containing Pequots, Niantics, Mohegans, and colonists. From June 1676 through the fall that year Talcott pursued various Native Americans, including Narragansett women and children, throughout southern New England. He led his troops during several massacres and battles, including at Second Battle of Nipsachuck Battlefield where Queen Quaiapen and Stonewall John were killed in one of the few cavalry charges of the War. To reward his service, the General Court gave Talcott along with John Allyn 700 acres of land at Hammonasset (an area that is now the towns of Clinton and Killingworth).
