= Worden Pond =

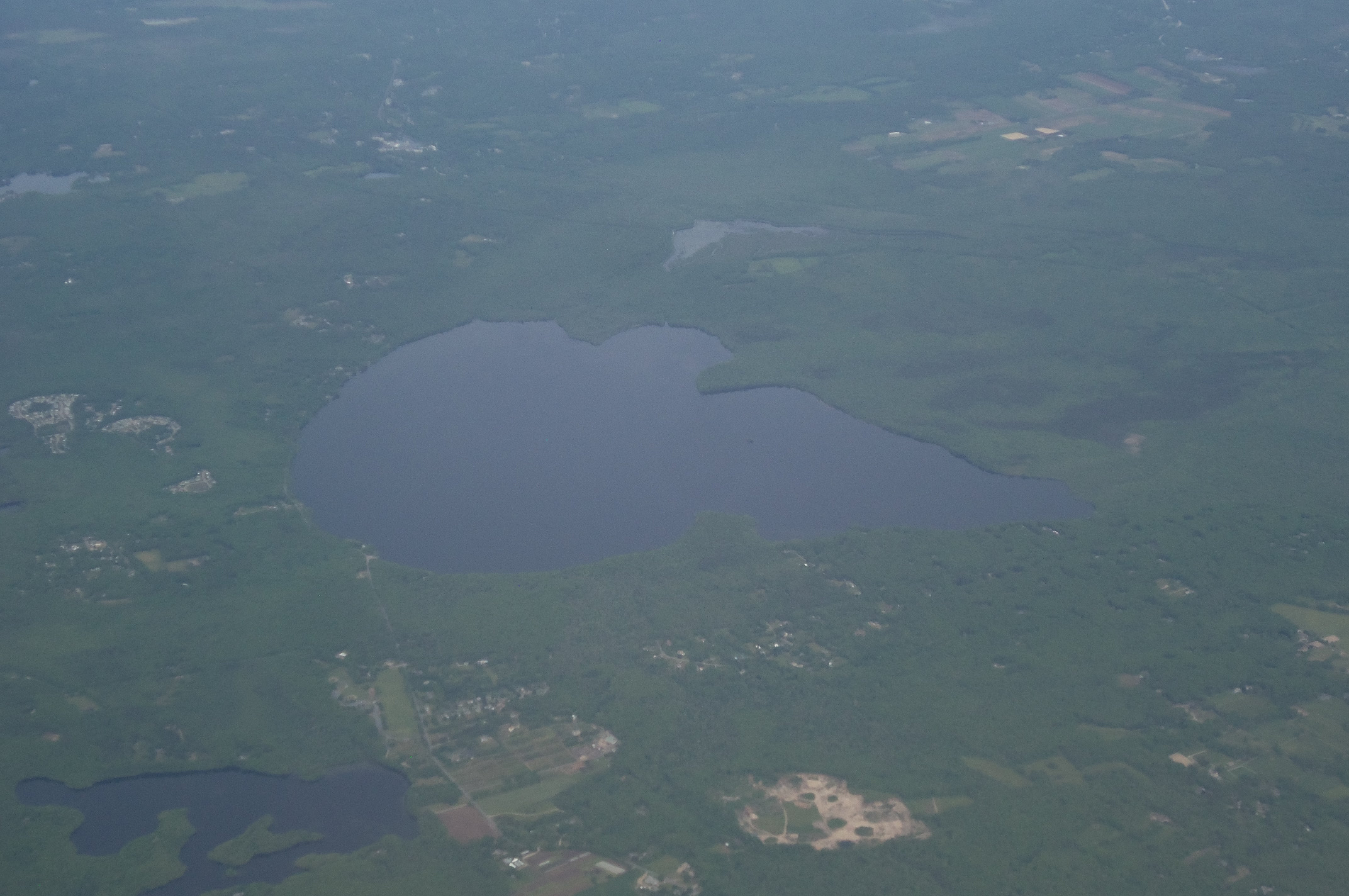
- Worden Pond (2021)

- Location within Rhode Island
- Location: Washington County, Rhode Island
- Coordinates: 41.438273°N 71.576741°W
- Type: Lake
- Max. depth: 9 ft (3 m)

Worden Pond is a large lake in South Kingstown, Washington County, Rhode Island. It is the second-largest freshwater lake in the state of Rhode Island, behind Scituate Reservoir, and the largest natural freshwater lake in the state.

== History ==
At the start of King Philip's War in June 1675 Roger Williams requested a meeting on behalf of the Massachusetts authorities, with the Narragansett tribal leaders at Richard Smith's Castle. Due to Queen Quaiapen's fears, they agreed instead to hold a meeting at Worden Pond (referred to as the "great pond" 10 miles from Smith's Castle) with Queen Quaiapen, Ninigret, Quinnapin, and Quaunochu where the Narragansetts agreed not to ally with the Wampanoag King Philip and to deliver Philip to the English if he sought refuge with the Narragansetts. Worden Pond was located near the Great Swamp fort.

In 1695 Samuel Worden (1646–1716) a physician purchased land surrounding the pond as part of the Pettaquamscutt purchase, and gave his name to the pond. The pond was also known as the head of the Pawcatuck River in the boundary dispute between Rhode Island and Connecticut.

== See also ==
- List of lakes in Rhode Island
