= Shannock Historic District =

Historic district in Rhode Island, United States

- U.S. National Register of Historic Places
- U.S. Historic district
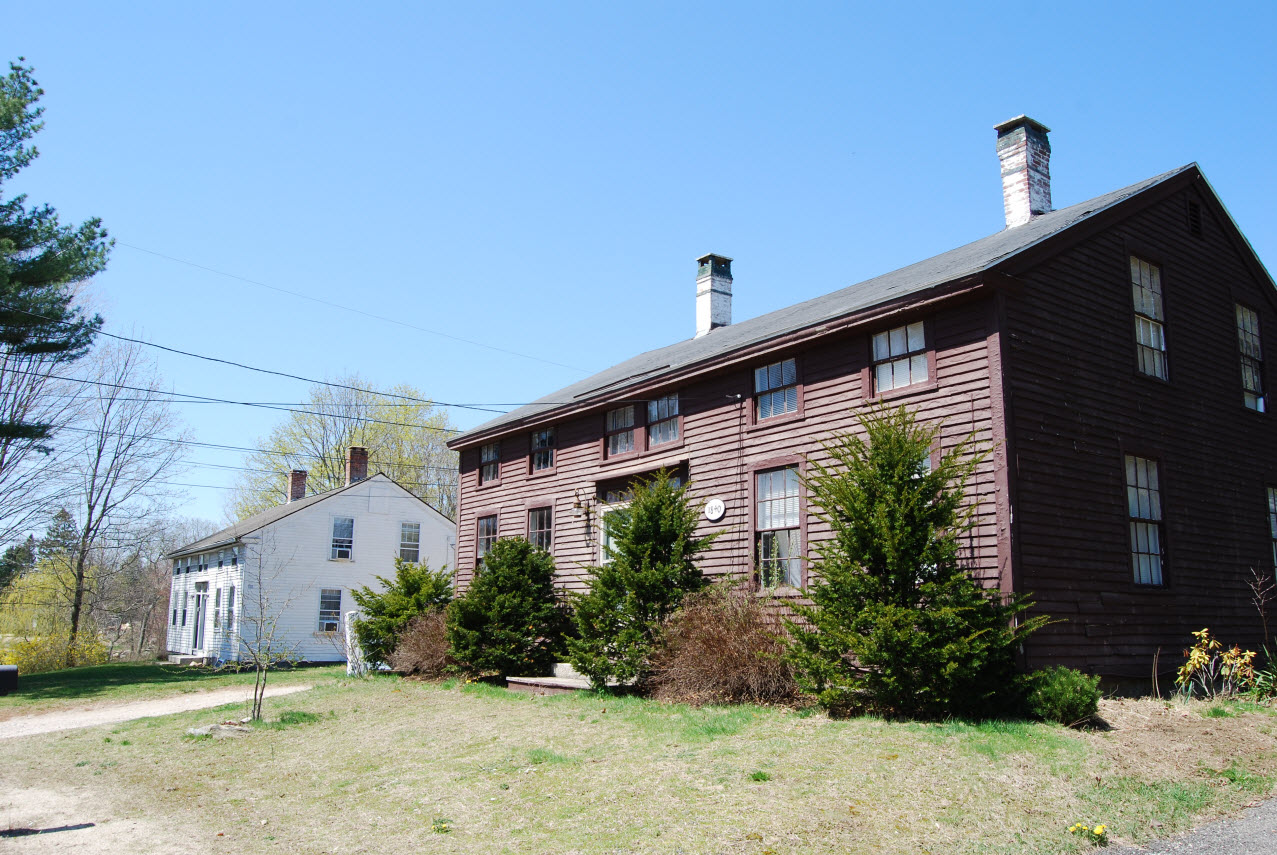
- Historic mill cottages, Shannock Village

- Location within Rhode Island Location within the United States
- Location: Main St., N. Shannock and W. Shannock Rds., Richmond, Rhode Island
- Coordinates: 41°26′53″N 71°38′28″W
- Architectural style: Classical Revival, Greek Revival
- NRHP reference No.: 83000005
- Added to NRHP: August 4, 1983

The Shannock Historic District is a historic mill village located along the Pawcatuck River in the towns of Richmond and Charlestown, Rhode Island. The postal code for Shannock is 02875. The village extends along Old Shannock Road, Railroad Street, and Shannock Village Road between two crossings of the Pawcatuck, which forms the border between the two towns. It lies mainly in Richmond, but extends along the road running southwest and southeast from the two crossings. Two mill complexes are the visual focal points of the village: the Carmichael plant on the west, and the Columbia Narrow Fabrics Company complex near the village center. The buildings in the village are predominantly residential worker housing set close to the road, which were built in the second half of the 19th century. There are two imposing Greek Revival houses, both built c. 1850, and one Late Victorian house, all of which belonged to mill owners. The area was listed on the National Register of Historic Places in 1983.

== See also ==
- National Register of Historic Places listings in Washington County, Rhode Island
