= Samuel Mosley =

New England soldier

- Heraldic achievement
- Born: 1641; Wollaston
- Died: c. 1680; Boston
- Military career
- Allegiance: Kingdom of England; New England Confederation
- Branch: Colonial militia
- Rank: Captain
- Conflicts: King Philip's War

Captain Samuel Mosley or Moseley (1641 – in or before 1680) was a New England settler and militiaman.

== Life ==
=== Origins ===
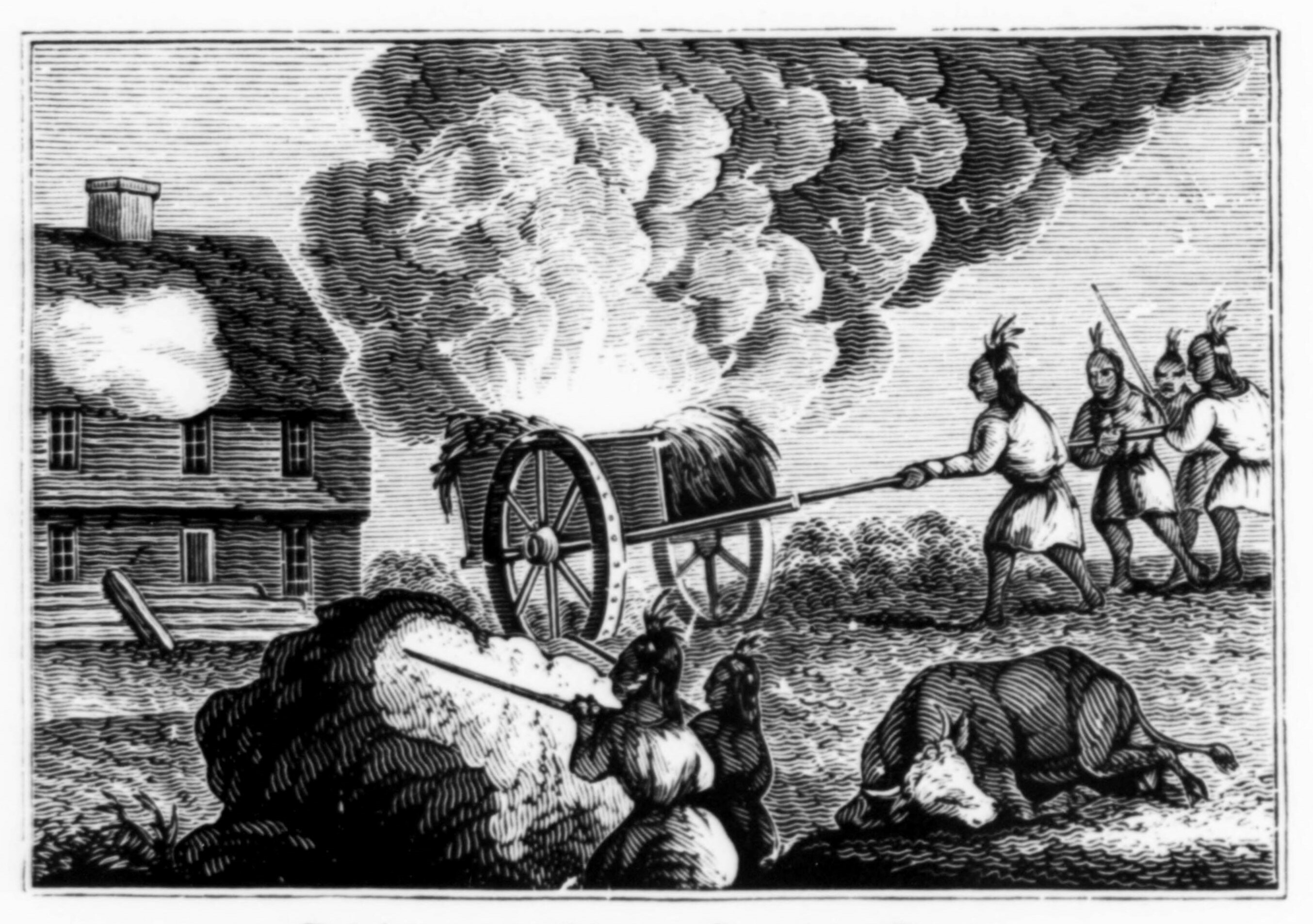
Indians attacking a garrison house

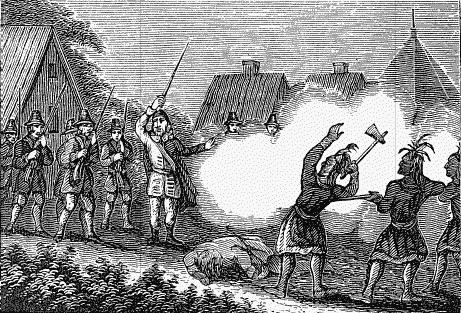
Colonists defending their settlement

Samuel Mosley was born on 14 June 1641 at Mount Wollaston, Braintree, near Quincy, Massachusetts, the son of Henry Mosley (born 1610/11), who had embarked from England on the Hopewell in August 1635. Henry Mosley settled in Braintree and fathered a daughter, Sarah, born in 1638. Samuel Mosley was a cooper by trade, who at some point before 30 May 1665, when the couple signed a contract, married Ann (1647 – after 1691), daughter of Isaac Addington (died 1653) and the sister of Isaac Addington, who was afterwards secretary of the colony. They had a son, Samuel, who died young, and two daughters, who survived their father. In 1675 Mosley was living at Boston, Massachusetts, apparently a man of repute and substance. Through his marriage, he was connected with most of the principal families of the town.

=== Colonial militia ===
On the outbreak of the war with "King Philip", the Grand Sachem of the Wampanoag Confederacy, in June 1675, two companies of militia were raised by order of the Boston Council. Mosley supplemented this little force by a third company of volunteers, or, as they were then called, "privateers", a term misunderstood by later writers, who have denounced Mosley as "a ruffianly old privateer from Jamaica". There is no evidence to connect him either with Jamaica or the sea. King Philip's War came to an end with the death of Philip on 12 August 1676 at the hands of Captain Benjamin Church, but during the year of its continuance many sharp and bloody skirmishes were fought, in most of which Mosley took a distinguished part, more especially in the capture and destruction, on 19 December 1675, of Canonicut, a fortified encampment to the west of Rhode Island. The small army of about a thousand men had to march thither some fifteen miles through the snow. Mosley and Devonport, a near connection of his, led the storming party, and the victory was complete, though with the loss of Devonport and two hundred killed and wounded. But the huts were burnt, and when the fight was over there was no shelter for the victors. Another terrible march in the snow was fatal to a large proportion of the wounded.

=== Reputation ===
Mosley was said by the clergy of the Indian missions to be brutal in his treatment of the Indians, and especially of the Christian Indians. He is said, for instance, to have made an unprovoked raid on a mission at Marlborough, to have plundered and beaten the disciples, and to have driven eleven of them, including six children, three women, and one old man, into Boston. But another clergyman, not connected with the mission, declared that Mosley merely arrested at Marlborough eleven Indians who were reasonably suspected of murdering a white man, his wife, and two children at Lancaster, some nine miles off. "But upon trial [at Boston] the said prisoners were all of them quitted from the fact". Mosley is said to be the original hero of the story of the man who scared the Indians by taking off his wig and hanging it on the branch of a tree, in order that he might fight more coolly. From the Indian point of view a man who could thus play with his scalp was an enemy not lightly to be encountered. The spelling of his name is taken from a facsimile of his signature given by Winsor.

=== Death ===
Mosley had died by 26 January 1680, when an inventory was made of his estate. His widow then married Nehemiah Pierce (died 1691).
