= Richmond, Rhode Island =

Richmond
- Town
- Richmond, Rhode Island
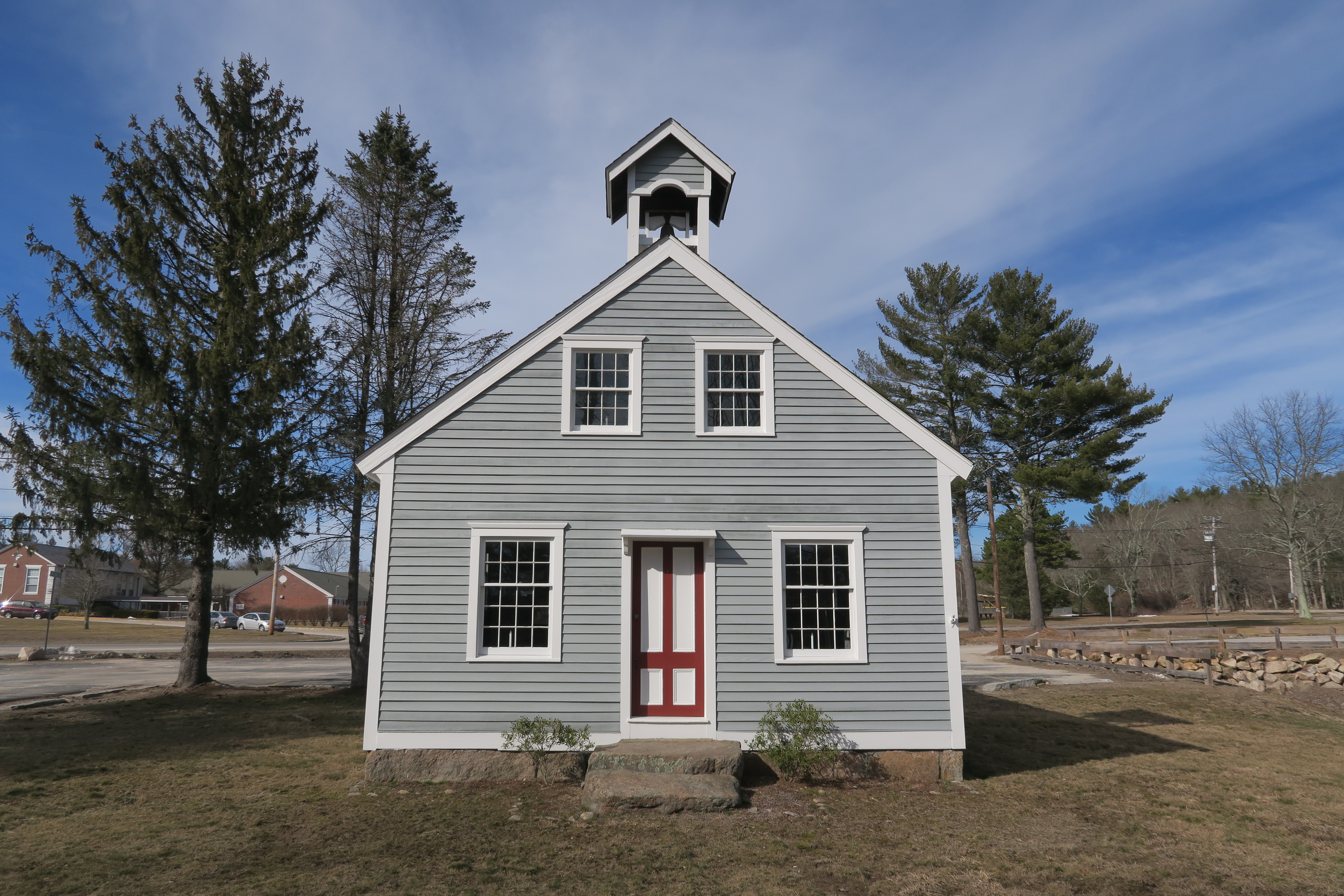
- Bell School; Richmond Historical Society

- Seal Logo
- Interactive map of Richmond
- Coordinates: 41°30′N 71°40′W
- Country: United States
- State: Rhode Island
- County: Washington

Government
  - Town Council: Samantha Wilcox; Mark Reynolds; James Palmisciano; Daniel Madnick; Michael Colasante
  - Town Administrator: Erin Liese

Area
  - Total: 40.8 sq mi (105.6 km^{2})
  - Land: 40.5 sq mi (105.0 km^{2})
  - Water: 0.23 sq mi (0.6 km^{2})
- Elevation: 381 ft (116 m)

Population (2020)
  - Total: 8,020
  - Density: 198/sq mi (76.4/km^{2})
- Time zone: UTC−5 (Eastern (EST))
  - Summer (DST): UTC−4 (EDT)
- ZIP codes: 02812 (Carolina), 02832 (Hope Valley), 02836 (Kenyon), 02875 (Shannock), 02892 (West Kingston), 02894 (Wood River Junction), 02898 (Wyoming)
- Area code: 401
- FIPS code: 44-61160
- GNIS feature ID: 1220089
- Website: https://www.richmondri.gov/

Richmond is a town in Washington County, Rhode Island, United States. The population was 8,020 at the 2020 census. It contains the villages of Alton, Arcadia, Barberville, Carolina, Hillsdale, Kenyon, Shannock, Tug Hollow, Usquepaug, Wood River Junction, Woodville, and Wyoming. Students from the Town of Richmond are part of the Chariho Regional School District, a school district shared between Charlestown and Hopkinton, Rhode Island.

== History ==
The Town of Richmond was originally part of the territory of Westerly, Rhode Island (1669 to 1747), which remained in dispute for several years among the Colony of Rhode Island and Providence Plantations, Connecticut Colony, and Massachusetts Bay Colony. In 1665, King Charles II dissolved the charters of those three colonies and renamed the disputed area "King’s County". In May 1669, the General Assembly of Rhode Island organized King's County into the town of Westerly, and the town of Westerly organized itself into four separate areas: Westerly, Charlestown, Richmond, and Hopkinton.

Charles II in 1665 did not dissolve the charters of Rhode Island, Connecticut or Massachusetts Bay Colony (though the last would have its charter revoked in 1684 and both Rhode Island and Connecticut would temporarily become nothing more than counties in the newly created Dominion of New England, 1686–1689). The Royal Commissioners of 1664-1665 renamed what was known as the Narragansett Country the King's province and placed authority over this area with Rhode Island and which then created King's County for this area and that was renamed Washington County during the Revolutionary period.

On April 19, 1873, there was a bridge washout in the village of Richmond Switch, which today is known as Wood River Junction. A passenger train approached, unaware of the bridge washout, and ran off the tracks and into the water. Eleven people died; others were swept downstream and were unaccounted for.

The Washington County Fair is the largest fair in the state and has been held in Richmond since 1970.

== Geography ==
Richmond is 35 miles (56 km) south of the state's capital, Providence. It is a mostly forested, landlocked community

According to the United States Census Bureau, the town has a total area of 40.8 square miles (106 km^{2}), of which 40.6 square miles (105 km^{2}) is land and 0.2 square miles (0.52 km^{2}) is water.

Richmond borders Charlestown to the south, Exeter to the north and northeast, Hopkinton to the west, and South Kingstown to the southeast. Richmond is the only town in Washington County that does not border another county or the ocean.

A 2,359-acre (9.55 km^{2}) tract in Richmond is owned by the state and managed for wildlife food and habitat as the Carolina Management Area. The Carolina Management Area is primarily forest (1,416 acres (5.73 km^{2})), but also includes wetlands and agricultural land.

== Demographics ==
Historical population
Census	Pop.	Note	%±
1790	1,760		—
1800	1,368		−22.3%
1810	1,330		−2.8%
1820	1,423		7.0%
1830	1,363		−4.2%
1840	1,361		−0.1%
1850	1,784		31.1%
1860	1,964		10.1%
1870	2,064		5.1%
1880	1,949		−5.6%
1890	1,669		−14.4%
1900	1,596		−4.4%
1910	1,633		2.3%
1920	1,301		−20.3%
1930	1,535		18.0%
1940	1,629		6.1%
1950	1,772		8.8%
1960	1,986		12.1%
1970	2,625		32.2%
1980	4,018		53.1%
1990	5,351		33.2%
2000	7,222		35.0%
2010	7,708		6.7%
2020	8,020		4.0%
U.S. Decennial Census

As of the census of 2020, there were 8,020 people and 2,965 households in the town. The population density was 198.9 inhabitants per square mile (76.8/km^{2}). There were 3,173 housing units in the town. The racial makeup of the town was 91.96% White, 0.55% African American, 0.55% Native American, 0.90% Asian, 0.87% from other races, and 5.14% from two or more races. Hispanic or Latino of any race were 2.09% of the population.

There were 2,965 households, out of which 36.2% had children under the age of 18 living with them, 54.3% were married couples living together, 15.2% had a female householder with no spouse present, and 13.9% had a male householder with no spouse present. 9.9% of all households were made up of individuals, and 2.3% had someone living alone who was 65 years of age or older. The average household size was 2.71 and the average family size was 3.09.

In the town, the population was spread out, with 22.8% under the age of 18, 6.9% from 18 to 24, 22.9% from 25 to 44, 32.1% from 45 to 64, and 15.2% who were 65 years of age or older. The median age was 42 years.

The median income for a household in the town was $118,924, and the median income for a family was $134,571. The per capita income for the town was $53,420. About 2.3% of the population were below the poverty line, including 0% of those under age 18 and 0.9% of those age 65 or over.

== Government ==
The town government is directed by a five-member town council that is headed by a council president at the Richmond Town Hall. For the purpose of school administration, Richmond is a member town of the Chariho Regional School District with the neighboring towns of Charlestown and Hopkinton. Richmond is represented in the Rhode Island State Senate by Elaine Morgan and in the Rhode Island House of Representatives by Megan Cotter.

In May 2007, Richmond voters approved a referendum to create a Home Rule Charter Commission. The Charter Commission subsequently created a Richmond Home Rule Charter, and the Town Council unanimously approved its placement on the November 2008 ballot. Richmond voters approved the Charter by a 70%–30% margin. The Rhode Island General Assembly gave their approval on May 20, 2009, and the Charter took effect on May 28, 2009, when Governor Donald Carcieri allowed it to become law without his signature.

The Charter retains many features of the prior government: the five-member town council headed by a council president; an elected town clerk; and a Finance Board and an annual Financial Town Meeting. The major changes included four-year terms for the town councilors instead of two years, effective in November 2010, and the creation of a Town Administrator who reports directly to the town council.

== Politics ==
Richmond leans Republican at the local level. It voted for Republicans Allan Fung for governor in 2018 and Ashley Kalus in 2022. It is represented by Republican Elaine J. Morgan in the Rhode Island Senate and Democrat Megan Cotter in the Rhode Island House of Representatives. Its town council has been historically controlled by Republicans until the 2024 election in which all four Democrats on the ballot won election. However, Richmond leans more Democratic in federal elections. It voted for Democratic Senators Sheldon Whitehouse and Jack Reed in 2018 and 2020, respectively. Richmond has voted for Democratic presidential nominees since 1988, with the exception of 2016, when Donald Trump won the town by 8%. Joe Biden flipped the town back for the Democratic Party in 2020 by three votes. In 2024, the town voted for Donald Trump once again.

== Notable people ==
- Billy Gilman (born 1988), country artist and runner-up of Season 11 of The Voice. Gilman is from the village of Hope Valley and is often mistaken as being from Hopkinton because most of the village is located in that town
- Thomas A. Tefft (1826–1859), architect
- Frank J. Williams (born 1940), Chief Justice of the Supreme Court of Rhode Island (2001–2009)

== National Register of Historic Places listings ==
- Carolina Village Historic District
- John Hoxsie House
- Shannock Historic District
- Wyoming Village Historic District
