= Great Swamp Fight =

1675 battle of King Philip's War

Great Swamp Massacre
- Part of King Philip's War
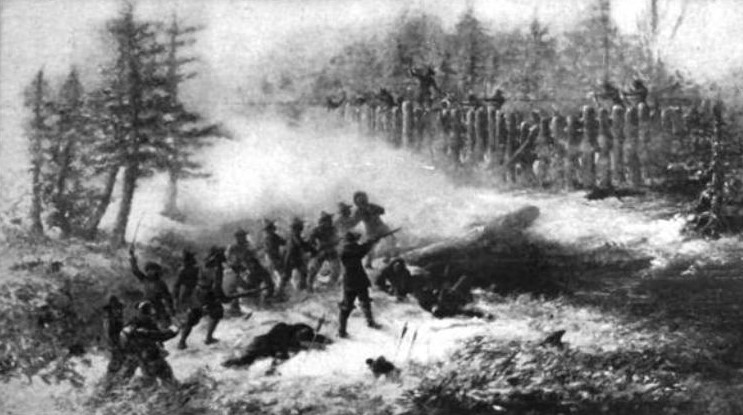
- A painting of the Great Swamp Massacre
Date	December 19, 1675
Location	South Kingstown, Rhode Island 41°28′07″N 71°35′44″W
Result	New England victory

Belligerents
New England Confederation; Pequots; Mohegans	Narragansetts

Commanders and leaders
Governor Josiah Winslow (Commander-in-chief); Major Samuel Appleton (Massachusetts Bay Colony commander); Governor Robert Treat (Connecticut Colony commander); Major William Bradford (Plymouth Colony commander); Uncas (Mohegan Sachem); Captain William Raymond	Canonchet (Narragansett Sachem)

Strength
1,000 militia 150 warriors	1,000 warriors 1 fort

Casualties and losses
~70 killed ~150 wounded	~ 97 warriors killed ~300–1,000 non-combatants killed ~300 captured 1 fort destroyed
- Location within Rhode Island

The Great Swamp Massacre or the Great Swamp Fight was a crucial battle fought during King Philip's War between the colonial militia of New England and the Narragansett people in December 1675. It was fought near the villages of Kingston and West Kingston in the Colony of Rhode Island and Providence Plantations. The combined force of the New England militia included 150 Pequots, and they inflicted a huge number of Narragansett casualties, including many hundreds of women and children. The battle has been described by historians as "one of the most brutal and lopsided military encounters in all of New England's history."

== Background ==
The Pokanoket Indians had helped the original pilgrim settlers to survive, under the leadership of Massasoit. His sons Wamsutta and Metacom took on the English names of Alexander and Philip, respectively. Alexander became sachem of the Pokanokets on the death of his father, but he died within a year and Philip succeeded him in 1662. Philip began laying plans to attack the colonists in Massachusetts, Rhode Island, and Connecticut, and he slowly built a confederation of neighboring Indian tribes. He also gathered muskets and gunpowder for the eventual attack, but only in small numbers in order that the colonists would not be alarmed.

Several Wampanoag men attacked and killed colonists in Swansea, Massachusetts, on June 20, 1675, and that began King Philip's War. The Indians laid siege to the town, then destroyed it five days later and killed several more people. A full eclipse of the moon occurred in the New England area on June 27, 1675 (O.S.) (July 7, 1675 N.S.; See Old Style and New Style dates), and various tribes looked at it as a good omen for attacking the colonists. Officials from the Plymouth and Massachusetts Bay colonies responded quickly to the attacks on Swansea; on June 28, they sent a punitive military expedition which destroyed the Wampanoag town at Mount Hope in Bristol, Rhode Island.

The Indians waged attacks on settlements in Massachusetts and Connecticut, but Rhode Island was spared at the beginning. In October, the Indians struck again with raids on the towns of Hatfield, Northampton, and Springfield, where almost the entire settlement was burned to the ground. As winter set in, the attacks diminished. The Narragansetts remained officially neutral in the war due in part to the urging of Roger Williams, signing a neutrality treaty with the Massachusetts Bay Colony in October of 1675. Although not involved in the war, they had sheltered many of King Philip's men, women, and children, and several of their warriors had participated in Indian raiding parties. The colonists distrusted the Narragansetts and feared that the tribe would join King Philip's cause in the spring, which caused great concern due to the tribe's location. The militia burned several abandoned Narragansett villages as they marched around Narragansett Bay, as the tribe had retreated to a large fort in the center of the Great Swamp near Kingston, Rhode Island. On November 2, 1675, Josiah Winslow led a combined force of over 1,000 colonial militia, including about 150 Pequot and Mohegan Indians, against the Narragansetts living around Narragansett Bay.

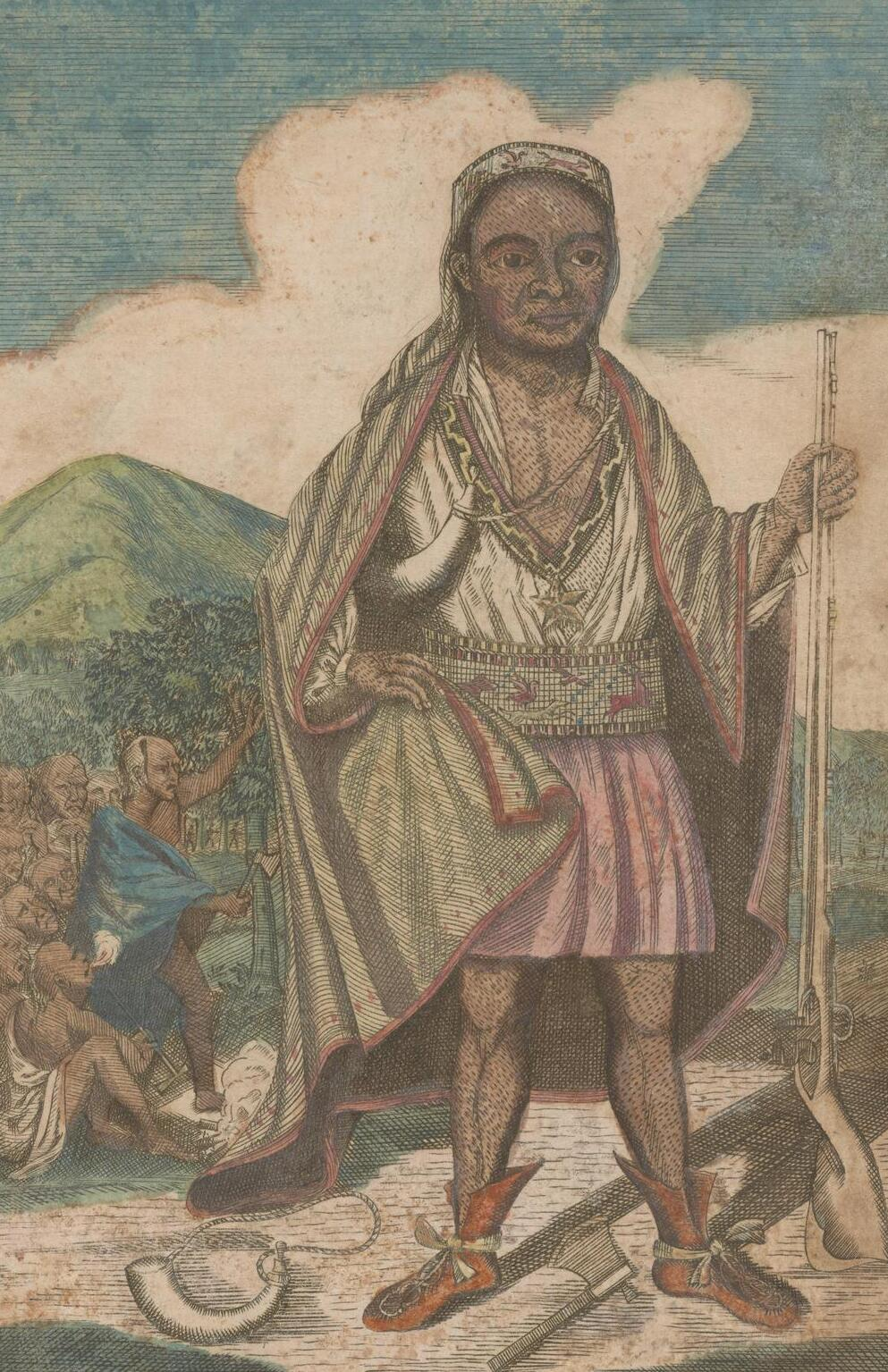
Philip. King of Mount Hope, caricature by Paul Revere, illustration from the 1772 edition of Benjamin Church's The Entertaining History of King Philip's War

One colonist was accused of fighting on the Indian side of the battle. Joshua Tefft reportedly wounded Captain Nathaniel Seely of Connecticut (son of Captain Robert Seeley), who subsequently died. An Indian spy reported that Tefft "did them good service & killed & wounded 5 or 6 English in that fight & before they would trust him he had killed a miller an English man at Narragansett and brought his scalpe to them."

== Battle ==
On December 15, 1675, after peace negotiations failed between Stonewall John and the militia, Narragansett warriors attacked the Jireh Bull Blockhouse and killed at least 15 people. 15-year-old James Eldred escaped from the blockhouse and was pursued a considerable distance; he survived having a tomahawk thrown at him at close range and a hand-to-hand encounter with a Narraganset warrior. This occurred along Indian Run Brook in Wakefield-Peacedale, Rhode Island. The Narragansetts saw swamps as ideal defensive locations in wartime, leading them to take up residence in the Great Swamp during the conflict.

Four days later, the Great Swamp Battle took place on the bitterly cold and stormy day of December 19, 1675. The colonial militia from Plymouth Colony, Connecticut Colony, and Massachusetts Bay Colony were led to the main Narragansett settlement in South Kingstown, Rhode Island, by an Indian guide named Indian Peter. The low temperatures froze the natural moat that surrounded the Narragansett encampment, allowing the colonial troops to pass easily. The massive fort occupied about 5 acres (20,000 m^{2}) of land and was initially occupied by over a thousand people, but it was eventually overrun after a fierce fight. The settlement was burned. Its inhabitants--including hundreds of women, children, and elderly non-combatants—were killed, the majority of them brutally burned alive. Most of the tribe's winter stores were destroyed, leaving survivors to starve to death or die of exposure in the freezing swamp. It is believed that at least 97 Narragansett warriors and 300 to 1,000 non-combatants were killed, though exact figures are unknown. The forces destroyed the blacksmith forge of Stonewall John, although he escaped and was killed several months later.

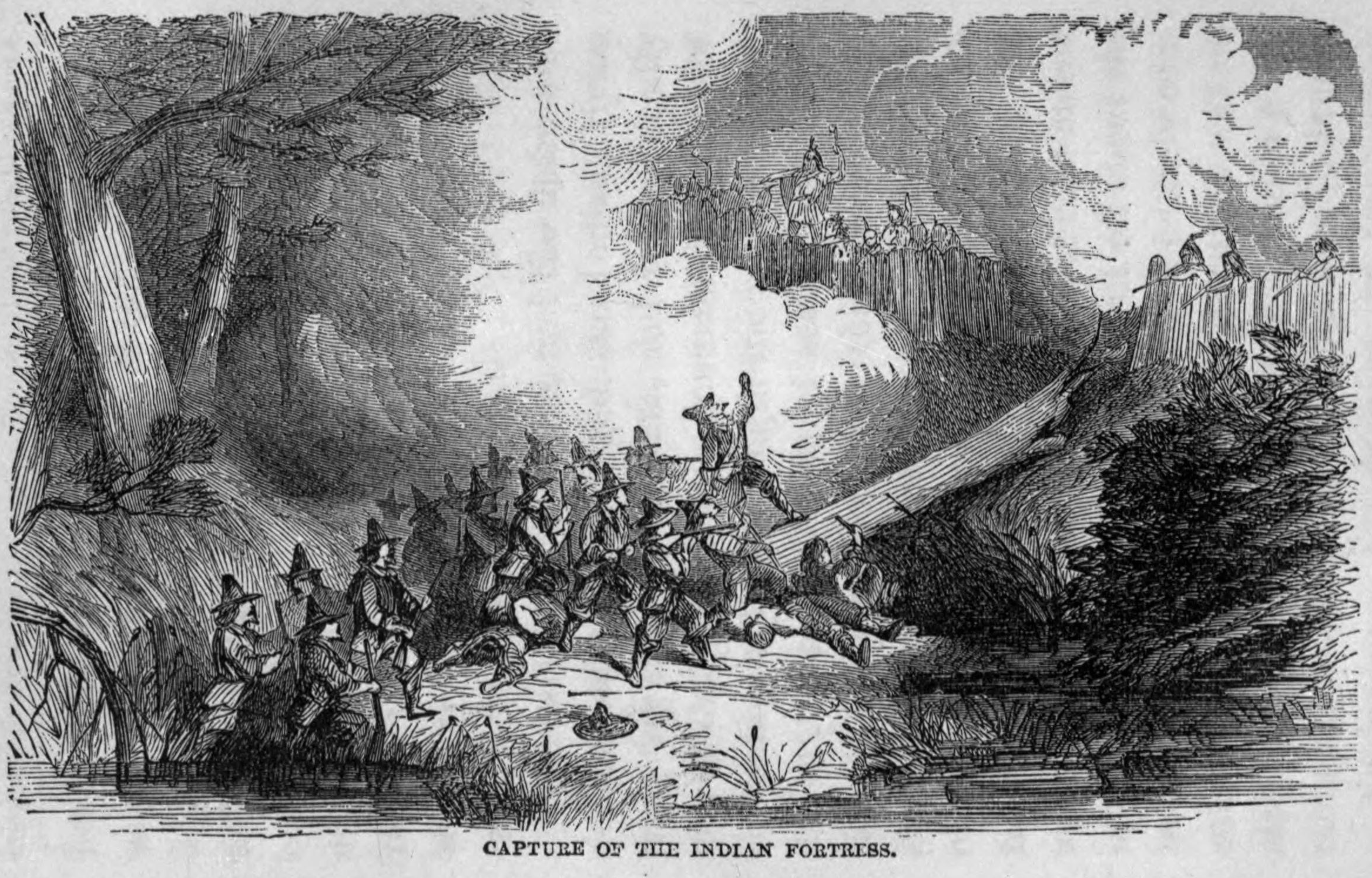
Engraving depicting the colonial assault on the Narragansetts' fort in the Great Swamp Massacre in December 1675

Many of the warriors and their families escaped into the frozen swamp; hundreds more died there from wounds combined with the harsh conditions. The colonists lost many of their officers in this assault, and about 70 of their men were killed and nearly 150 more wounded. The dead and wounded militiamen were evacuated to the settlements on Aquidneck Island in Narragansett Bay where they were buried or cared for by many of the Rhode Island colonists.

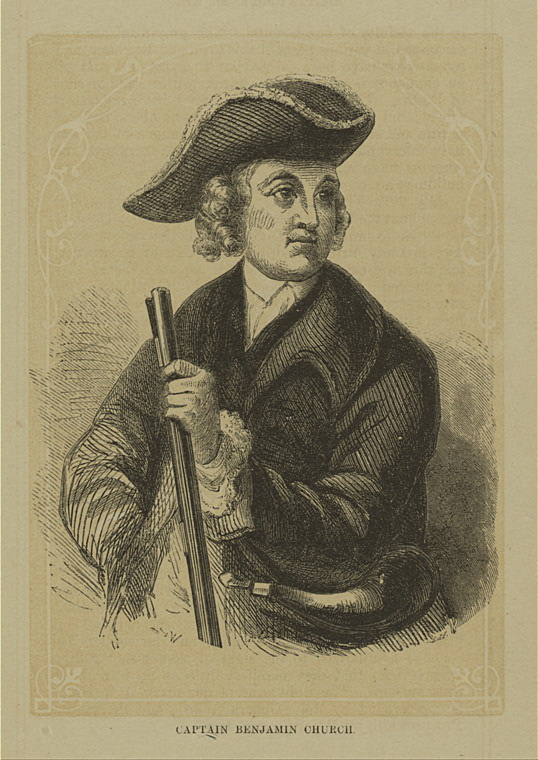
Benjamin Church, the first American ranger

== Aftermath ==
The Great Swamp Massacre was a critical blow to the Narragansett tribe from which they never fully recovered. The spring of 1676 brought a counter-offensive by Canonchet after he organized a confederation of 2000 braves. Providence was burned, including Roger William's house. The Narragansetts were nearly completely defeated when Canonchet was captured and executed in April 1676. Female sachem Queen Quaiapen was ambushed on July 2 attempting to cross a river at the Second Battle of Nipsachuck Battlefield and Stonewall John, a notable Indian mason, was also killed. Finally, Philip was shot and killed on August 12 by John Alderman, an Indian soldier in the company of Benjamin Church. Many of the Narragansett survivors were sold into slavery, sentenced to death, or fled to join other nearby tribes, like the Niantics.

== Legacy and monument ==
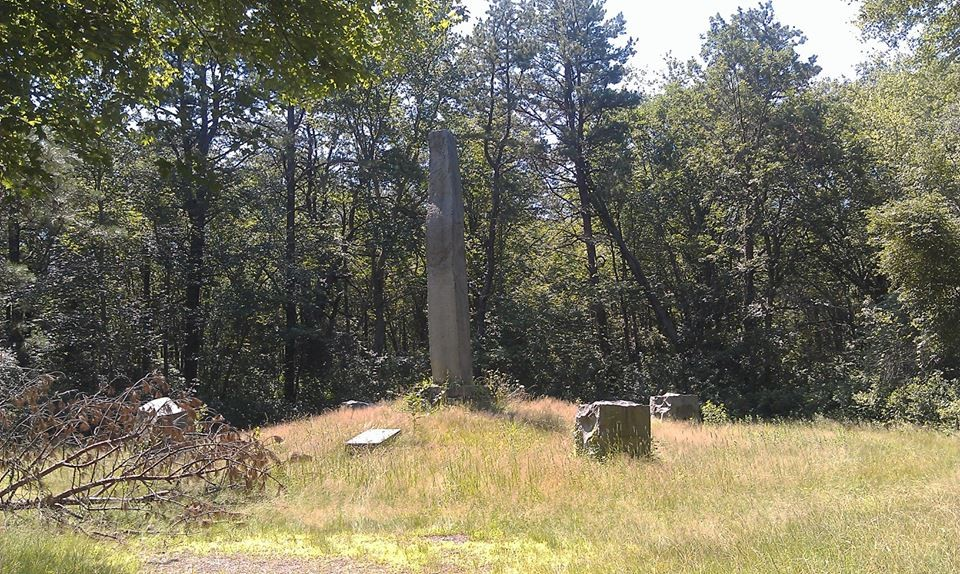
The Great Swamp Fight Monument located in the Great Swamp State Management Area, West Kingston, Rhode Island

A memorial marker was placed at the presumed site of the battle in 1906 on five acres of land donated by Rowland Hazard III and the Hazard family. The rough granite shaft with only the date of the conflict engraved on it, stands about 20 feet high on a mound. It was erected by the Rhode Island Society of Colonial Wars to commemorate the battle and to serve as a cemetery memorial. Four roughly squared granite markers stand around the mound at the four cardinal compass points engraved with the names of the colonies which took part in the encounter; two tablets on opposite sides of the shaft give additional data. The markers are near West Kingston, Rhode Island.

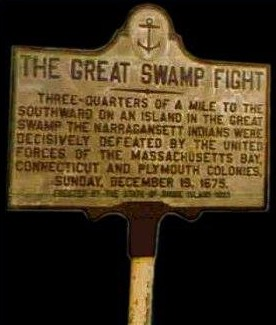
The Great Swamp Fight roadside marker formerly located on Rhode Island Route 2 in West Kingston, Rhode Island

The dedication of the monument was attended by descendants of both sides of the battle. The dedication speaker, Rowland G. Hazard II, said of the monument, "We dedicate this rugged granite shaft, frost-riven from the native hills, untouched by the tool of man, as a fitting emblem of the rugged and unadorned Pilgrim and Puritan of 16 hundred and 75." Three members of the modern Narragansett tribe pulled the veil from the stone. The inscription states:

Attacked within their fort upon this island the Narragansett Indians made their last stand in King Philip's War and were crushed by the united forces of the Massachusetts Connecticut and Plymouth Colonies in the "Great Swamp Fight" Sunday 19 December 1675. This record was placed by the Rhode Island Society of Colonial Wars 1906.

A second marker was placed there in 1916 which has since gone missing. The inscription was:

In memory of Major Samuel Appleton of Ipswich, Massachusetts who commanded the Massachusetts forces and led the victorious storming column at the Great Swamp Fight Dec. 19, 1675. This Tablet placed by the Rhode Island Historical Society 1916.

In the 1930s, Narragansett-Wampanoag scholar Princess Red Wing initiated an annual commemorative ceremony at the site of the battle. From the time of the 1906 monument dedication until 2021, the land on which the monument sits was owned by the Rhode Island Historical Society. On 23 October 2021, the title to the five acre of land constituting the monument site was transferred to the Narragansett Tribe to be held in perpetual trust.

== Order of battle of the army of the United Colonies ==
The army of the United Colonies which fought at the Great Swamp Fight consisted of three regiments of unequal strength, each regiment containing companies raised from one of the three colonies.

=== Headquarters ===
Commander – General Josiah Winslow, Governor of Plymouth Colony (wounded in action)

- Surgeon – Daniel Weld
- Chaplain – Joseph Dudley
- Aide to General Winslow – Captain Benjamin Church (wounded in action)

=== Massachusetts Bay Colony Regiment ===
Commander – Major Samuel Appleton

- 1st Company – Lieutenant Jeremiah Swain
- 2nd Company – Captain Samuel Mosely
- 3rd Company – Captain James Oliver
- 4th Company – Captain Isaac Johnson (killed in action)
- 5th Company – Captain Nathaniel Davenport (killed in action)
- 6th Company – Captain Joseph Gardner (killed in action)
- Cavalry troop – Captain Thomas Prentice

=== Plymouth Colony Regiment ===
Commander – Major William Bradford (wounded in action)

- 1st Company – Lieutenant Robert Barker
- 2nd Company – Captain John Gorham (killed in action)

=== Connecticut Colony Regiment ===
Commander – Major Robert Treat

- 1st Company – Captain John Gallup (killed in action)
- 2nd Company – Captain Samuel Marshall (killed in action)
- 3rd Company – Captain Nathaniel Seeley (killed in action)
- 4th Company – Captain Thomas Watts
- 5th Company – Captain John Mason, Jr. (mortally wounded)
- Pequot Indian Company – Captain James Avery

== Notable officers and Indian chiefs ==
- Governor Josiah Winslow
- Major Samuel Appleton
- Captain James Avery
- Major William Bradford
- Captain Benjamin Church
- Captain George Denison
- Captain Joseph Gardner (Salem Company)
- John Gorham I, after whom Gorham, Maine, is named, the great grandfather of John Gorham 4th.
- Captain Isaac Johnson (killed in action)
- Captain Samuel Marshall, Windsor Horse Troop (killed in action)
- Captain Nathaniel Seeley (killed in action, age 48) oldest son of Massachusetts Bay Colony Puritan settler Robert Seeley
- Captain Josiah Standish Plymouth militia
- Governor Robert Treat
- Chief Canonchet
- Chief Metacomet
- Chief Uncas
