= National Register of Historic Places listings in North Kingstown, Rhode Island =

This is a list of Registered Historic Places in North Kingstown, Rhode Island.

Contents: Counties in Rhode Island

Bristol | Kent | Newport | Providence (Pawtucket | Providence (city) | Woonsocket) | Washington

This National Park Service list is complete through NPS recent listings posted May 1, 2026.

	Name on the Register	Image	Date listed	Location	City or town	Description
1	Allen-Madison House	Allen-Madison House	March 28, 1980 (#80000015)	Post Rd. 41°37′06″N 71°25′16″W	North Kingstown	
2	David S. Baker Estate	David S. Baker Estate	August 4, 2011 (#11000512)	51 & 67 Prospect Ave. 41°33′54″N 71°27′11″W	North Kingstown	
3	Camp Endicott	Camp Endicott	October 19, 1978 (#78000015)	Between 7th and 10th Sts. 41°36′10″N 71°25′59″W	North Kingstown	Mostly demolished; some Quonset huts survive at the Seabee Museum and Memorial Park
4	Silas Casey Farm	Silas Casey Farm	August 14, 1973 (#73000006)	Boston Neck Rd. 41°30′40″N 71°26′01″W	North Kingstown	
5	Cocumscossoc Archeological Site	Cocumscossoc Archeological Site	April 12, 1993 (#93000605)	55 Richard Smith Drive; 41°35′00″N 71°27′16″W	North Kingstown	Area around one of state's oldest houses has yielded considerable information from digs
6	Crowfield Historic District	Crowfield Historic District	July 19, 1985 (#85001646)	Boston Neck Rd. 41°32′00″N 71°25′27″W	North Kingstown	
7	Davisville Historic District	Davisville Historic District	July 19, 1985 (#85001645)	Davisville Rd. 41°37′17″N 71°28′52″W	North Kingstown	
8	Devil's Foot Cemetery Archeological Site, RI-694	Devil's Foot Cemetery Archeological Site, RI-694	November 15, 1984 (#84000562)	Address Restricted	North Kingstown	
9	George Douglas House	George Douglas House	October 10, 1975 (#75000006)	South of Allenton at Tower Hill and Gilbert Stuart Rds. 41°31′18″N 71°27′46″W	North Kingstown	
10	Ezekial Gardner House	Ezekial Gardner House	July 19, 1985 (#85001654)	297 Pendar Rd. 41°31′47″N 71°28′35″W	North Kingstown	
11	Hamilton Mill Village Historic District	Hamilton Mill Village Historic District	November 3, 1983 (#83003874)	Boston Neck and Martha Rds., Salisbury and Web Aves. 41°32′56″N 71°26′19″W	North Kingstown	
12	Lafayette Village	Lafayette Village	November 14, 1978 (#78000019)	Ten Rod Road; 41°34′24″N 71°28′59″W	North Kingstown	
13	Stephen Northup House	Stephen Northup House	July 19, 1985 (#85001653)	99 Featherbed Lane; 41°33′05″N 71°26′52″W	North Kingstown	Built by early Providence and Narragansett settler, Stephen Northup
14	Old Narragansett Cemetery	Old Narragansett Cemetery	July 19, 1985 (#85001655)	Shermantown Rd. 41°31′08″N 71°28′42″W	North Kingstown	
15	Old Narragansett Church	Old Narragansett Church	July 2, 1973 (#73000009)	60 Church Lane, Wickford; 41°34′21″N 71°26′59″W	North Kingstown	
16	Palmer-Northrup House	Palmer-Northrup House	April 11, 1973 (#73000010)	7919 Post Rd. 41°34′37″N 71°27′40″W	North Kingstown	
17	Joseph Pierce Farm	Joseph Pierce Farm	July 19, 1985 (#85001652)	933 Gilbert Stuart Rd. 41°31′22″N 71°26′42″W	North Kingstown	
18	Plum Beach Lighthouse	Plum Beach Lighthouse	March 30, 1988 (#88000281)	Off Plum Beach, western passage of Narragansett Bay; 41°31′48″N 71°24′20″W	North Kingstown	
19	Poplar Point Lighthouse	Poplar Point Lighthouse	February 25, 1988 (#87001703)	1 Poplar Ave. 41°34′15″N 71°26′23″W	North Kingstown	
20	Rathbun House	Rathbun House	July 19, 1985 (#85001651)	343 Beacon Dr. 41°34′20″N 71°30′20″W	North Kingstown	
21	Benoni Ross House	Benoni Ross House	December 28, 2008 (#08000717)	97 Lafayette Road; 41°34′24″N 71°29′24″W	North Kingstown	
22	St. Paul's Church	St. Paul's Church	June 30, 1972 (#72000009)	76 Main St. 41°34′17″N 71°27′01″W	North Kingstown	
23	Esbon Sanford House	Esbon Sanford House	July 19, 1985 (#85001649)	88 Featherbed Lane; 41°33′04″N 71°26′55″W	North Kingstown	
24	Saunderstown Historic District	Saunderstown Historic District	July 19, 1985 (#85001647)	Roughly bounded by Stillman, Waterway, Willet, Boston Neck & Ferry Rds. 41°30′28″N 71°25′21″W	North Kingstown	
25	Scrabbletown Historic and Archeological District	Scrabbletown Historic and Archeological District	April 11, 1985 (#85000790)	Address Restricted	North Kingstown	
26	Shady Lea Historic District	Shady Lea Historic District	July 19, 1985 (#85001644)	Shady Lea and Tower Hill Rds. 41°32′07″N 71°27′56″W	North Kingstown	
27	Six Principle Baptist Church	Six Principle Baptist Church	November 21, 1978 (#78000022)	85 Old Baptist Rd. 41°35′34″N 71°29′29″W	North Kingstown	
28	Joseph Slocum House	Joseph Slocum House	July 19, 1985 (#85001648)	Slocum Rd. 41°31′35″N 71°31′04″W	North Kingstown	
29	Spink Farm	Spink Farm	July 19, 1985 (#85001650)	1325 Shermantown Rd. 41°30′34″N 71°29′50″W	North Kingstown	
30	Gilbert Stuart Birthplace	Gilbert Stuart Birthplace	October 15, 1966 (#66000004)	Gilbert Stuart Rd. 41°31′36″N 71°26′44″W	North Kingstown	Birthplace of Gilbert Stuart, portraitist of George Washington and other Revolutionary figures. Preserved intact.
31	Wickford Historic District	Wickford Historic District	December 31, 1974 (#74000013)	Roughly bounded by Tower Hill and Post Rds. as far N as Mill Cove and S to Lindley Ave; 41°34′12″N 71°27′24″W	North Kingstown	
32	YWCA Site		November 20, 1980 (#80000027)	Address Restricted	North Kingstown	

== See also ==
- National Register of Historic Places listings in Washington County, Rhode Island
- List of National Historic Landmarks in Rhode Island
