= James Arnold =

James Arnold may refer to:

== Musicians ==
- Kokomo Arnold (James Arnold, 1901–1968), blues musician
- Jimmy Arnold (musician) (1932–2004), founding member of The Four Lads
- James Arnold, singer and keyboardist of the post-hardcore band Before Their Eyes

== Others ==
- James Arnold (1781–1868), whaling merchant and benefactor of the Arnold Arboretum in Boston, Massachusetts
- James Arnold (commercial artist) (1909–1999), English author and artist
- James Arnold (Australian politician) (1902–1967), Australian Senator
- James Arnold (cricketer) (1869–1944), English cricketer
- James Arnold (New Zealand politician) (1859–1929), New Zealand politician and trade unionist
- James Edward Arnold (1939–2007), California businessman
- James Henry Arnold (1759–1836), British lawyer, Admiralty Advocate and fellow of the Royal Society
- James M. Arnold (1838–1897), associate justice and chief justice of the Supreme Court of Mississippi
- James Newell Arnold (1844–1927), collector and publisher of genealogical and historical records of the state of Rhode Island
- James R. Arnold (1923–2012), planetary scientist and chemist

== See also ==
- Jim Arnold (disambiguation)
- Jamie Arnold (disambiguation)
