= Jim Arnold =

Jim Arnold may refer to:

- Jim Arnold (American football) (born 1961), American football player
- Jim Arnold (footballer) (born 1950), English soccer player
- Jim Arnold (Indiana politician) (born 1950), American politician from Indiana
- Jim Arnold (Missouri politician) (1935–2021), American politician from Missouri
- James R. Arnold (1923–2012), planetary scientist and chemist

== See also ==
- James Arnold (disambiguation)
