= Slocum House =

Slocum House may refer to:

in the United States (by state)

- Slocum House (Fair Oaks, California), listed on the National Register of Historic Places in Sacramento County, California
- Joseph Slocum House, North Kingstown, Rhode Island, listed on the NRHP in Rhode Island
- Slocum House (Vancouver, Washington), in Clark County, Washington and listed on the National Register of Historic Places

== See also ==
- Slocum Hall (disambiguation)
