= Devil's Foot Cemetery Archeological Site, RI-694 =

- U.S. National Register of Historic Places
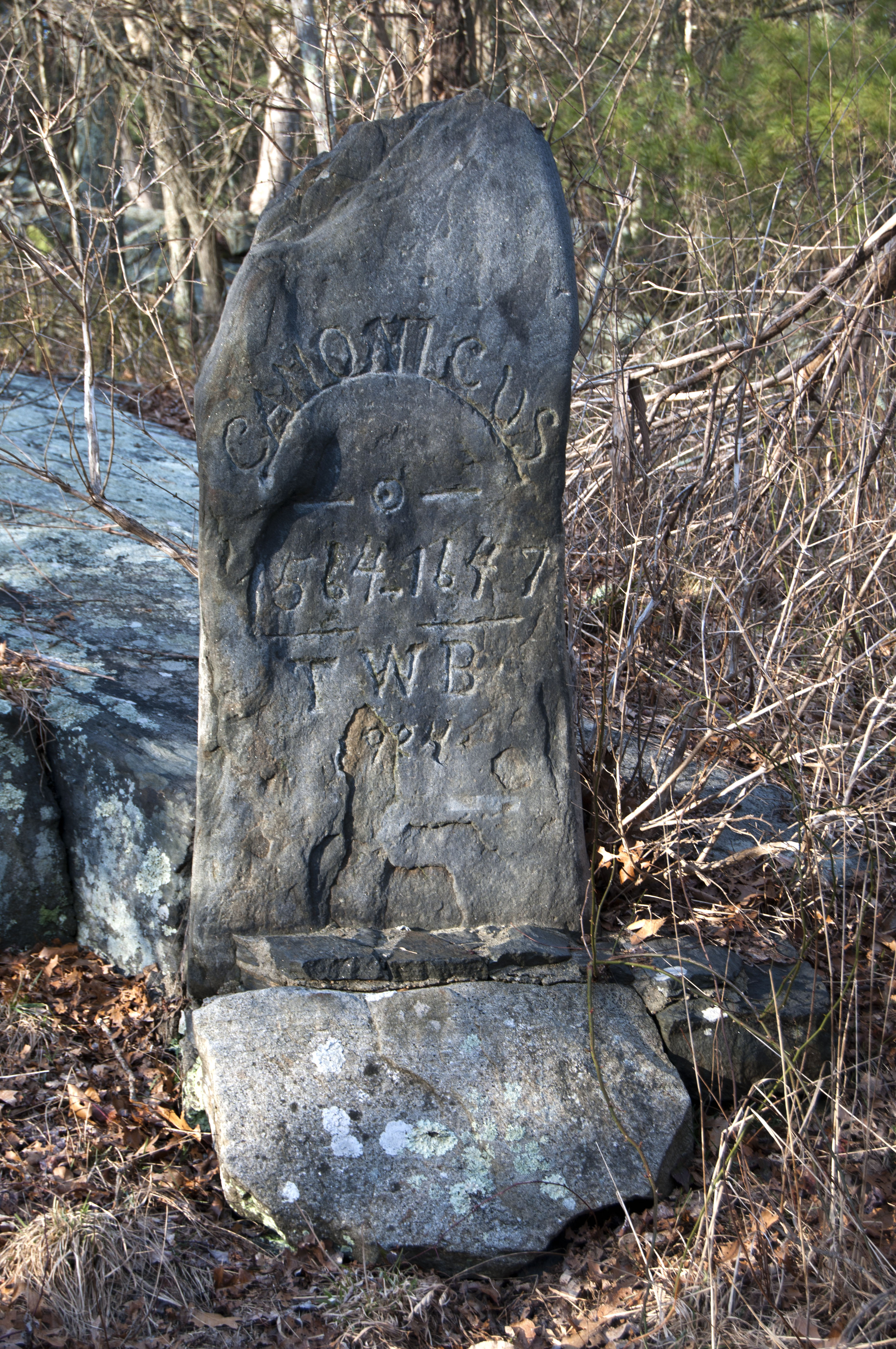
- Nearest city: North Kingston, Rhode Island
- NRHP reference No.: 84000562
- Added to NRHP: November 15, 1984

Devil's Foot Cemetery Archeological Site, RI-694 is an archaeological site in North Kingstown, Rhode Island. The site was added to the National Register of Historic Places in 1984.

In 1893, James Newell Arnold had written about Nicholas Hart unearthing graves at this location in 1868 and he sold the "relics" found on the skeleton, which included 27 rings and a copper neck plate inscribed "I.H.S." (most likely of Jesuit origins).

== See also ==
- National Register of Historic Places listings in Washington County, Rhode Island
