= Benoni Rose House =

Historic house in Rhode Island, United States

- U.S. National Register of Historic Places
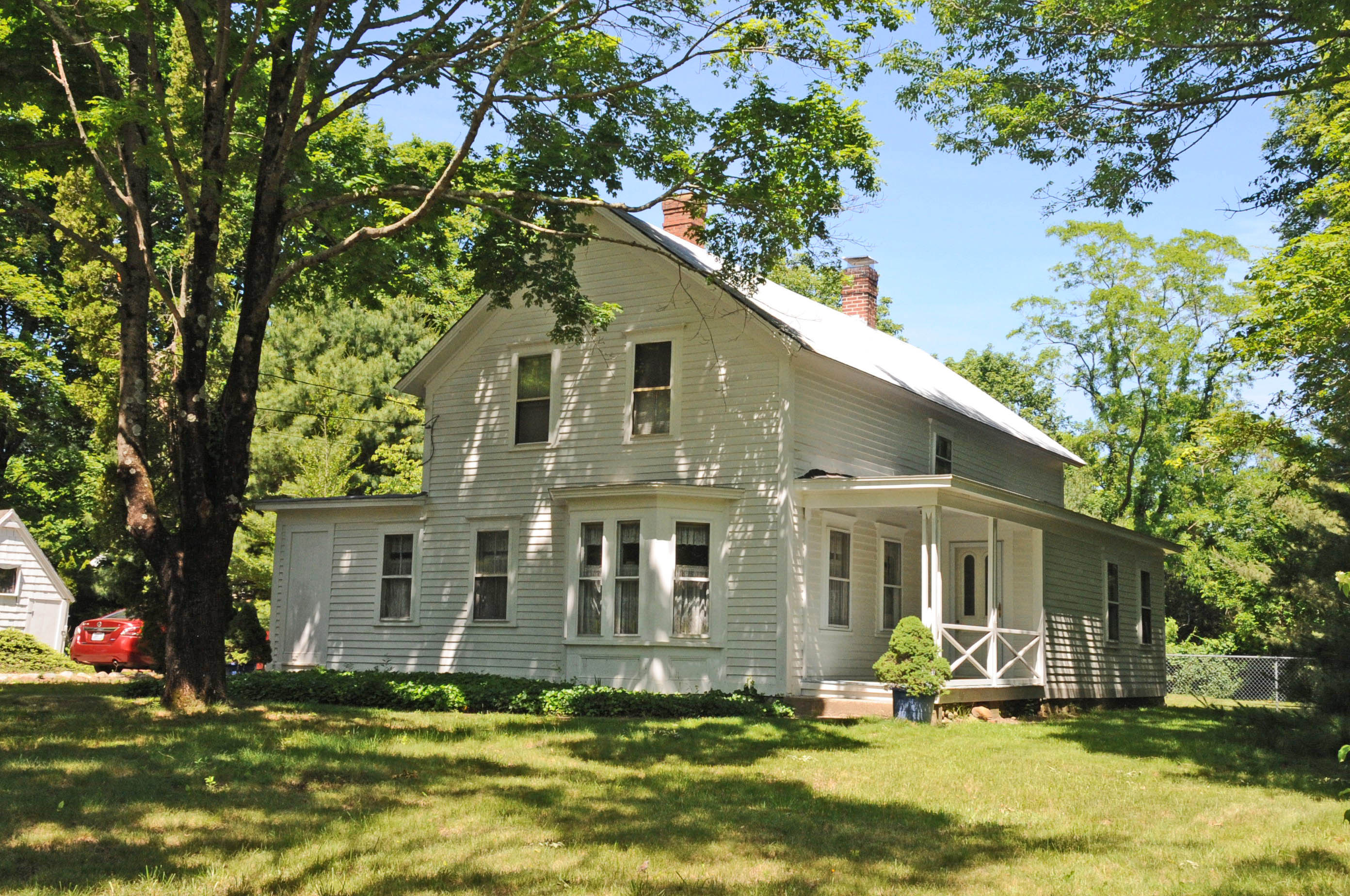

- Location within Rhode Island Location within the United States
- Location: North Kingstown, Rhode Island
- Coordinates: 41°34′24″N 71°29′24″W
- NRHP reference No.: 08000717
- Added to NRHP: December 28, 2008

The Benoni Rose House is an historic house at 97 Lafayette Road in North Kingstown, Rhode Island. It is a 1 1/2-story wood-frame structure, built in 1882 for Benoni Rose, a finisher at the mill in nearby Lafayette Village. The house is an excellent and well-preserved example of simple vernacular Victorian architecture. Unlike more elaborate example of the style, the styling of this house is limited to its porch, entrance and stairway. The Roses were among the first to buy land in this area, outside the main village and across the Annaquatucket River.

The house was added to the National Register of Historic Places on December 28, 2008, where it is listed as the "Benoni Ross House".

== See also ==
- National Register of Historic Places listings in Washington County, Rhode Island
