= 2143 Jimarnold =

Main-belt asteroid

Discovery
- Discovered by: E. F. Helin
- Discovery site: Palomar Obs.
- Discovery date: 26 September 1973

Designations
- Named after: James R. Arnold (American chemist)
- Alternative designations: 1973 SA · 1980 VZ_{1}
- Minor planet category: main-belt · (inner) background

Orbital characteristics
- Epoch 4 September 2017 (JD 2458000.5)
- Uncertainty parameter 0
- Observation arc: 62.13 yr (22,693 d)
- Aphelion: 2.8147 AU
- Perihelion: 1.7468 AU
- Semi-major axis: 2.2807 AU
- Eccentricity: 0.2341
- Orbital period (sidereal): 3.44 yr (1,258 days)
- Mean anomaly: 270.79°
- Mean motion: 0° 17^{m} 9.96^{s} / day
- Inclination: 8.3651°
- Longitude of ascending node: 17.405°
- Argument of perihelion: 352.42°

Physical characteristics
- Dimensions: 4.934±0.145 km
- Geometric albedo: 0.138±0.017
- Absolute magnitude (H): 13.7

2143 Jimarnold, provisional designation 1973 SA, is a background asteroid from the inner regions of the asteroid belt, approximately 5 kilometers in diameter. It was discovered on 26 September 1973, by astronomer Eleanor Helin at the Palomar Observatory in California, United States. The asteroid was named after American cosmochemist, James R. Arnold.

== Orbit and classification ==
Jimarnold is a non-family asteroid from the main belt's background population. It orbits the Sun in the inner asteroid belt at a distance of 1.7–2.8 AU once every 3 years and 5 months (1,258 days; semi-major axis of 2.28 AU). Its orbit has an eccentricity of 0.23 and an inclination of 8° with respect to the ecliptic.

The body's observation arc begins with a precovery taken at Palomar in April 1954, almost two decades prior to its official discovery observation.

== Physical characteristics ==
=== Diameter and albedo ===
According to the survey carried out by the NEOWISE mission of NASA's Wide-field Infrared Survey Explorer, Jimarnold measures 4.934 kilometers in diameter and its surface has an albedo of 0.138.

=== Rotation period ===
As of 2017, no rotational lightcurve of Jimarnold has been obtained from photometric observations. The body's rotation period, poles and shape remain unknown.

== Naming ==
This minor planet was named after James R. Arnold (1923–2012), professor of chemistry and director of California Space Science Institute at the University of California, San Diego. Arnold's cosmochemical research included the study of cosmic radiation, the origin of meteorites, for which he developed a computer model, the lunar soil and mapping of the Moon's composition. The official naming citation was proposed by the discoverer and Eugene Shoemaker, and published by the Minor Planet Center on 1 July 1979 (M.P.C. 4788).

In 2013, Arnold's son proposed that the interrobang ‽ be used as a symbol for the asteroid, reflecting his father's curiosity and his "insistence upon working with the resulting reality".
