= Jamie Arnold =

Jamie Arnold may refer to:

- Jamie Arnold (baseball, born 1974) (born 1974), Major League Baseball pitcher
- Jamie Arnold (basketball) (born 1975), American-born Israeli basketball player
- Jamie Arnold (baseball, born 2004) (born 2004), American professional baseball pitcher

== See also ==
- James Arnold (disambiguation)
