= Slocum Hall =

Slocum Hall may refer to:

- Slocum Hall (Ohio Wesleyan University), Delaware, Ohio, which is listed on the National Register of Historic Places in Delaware County, Ohio
- Slocum Hall (Syracuse University), Syracuse, New York

== See also ==
- Slocum House (disambiguation)
