= Scrabbletown Historic and Archeological District =

Historic district in Rhode Island, United States

- U.S. National Register of Historic Places
- U.S. Historic district
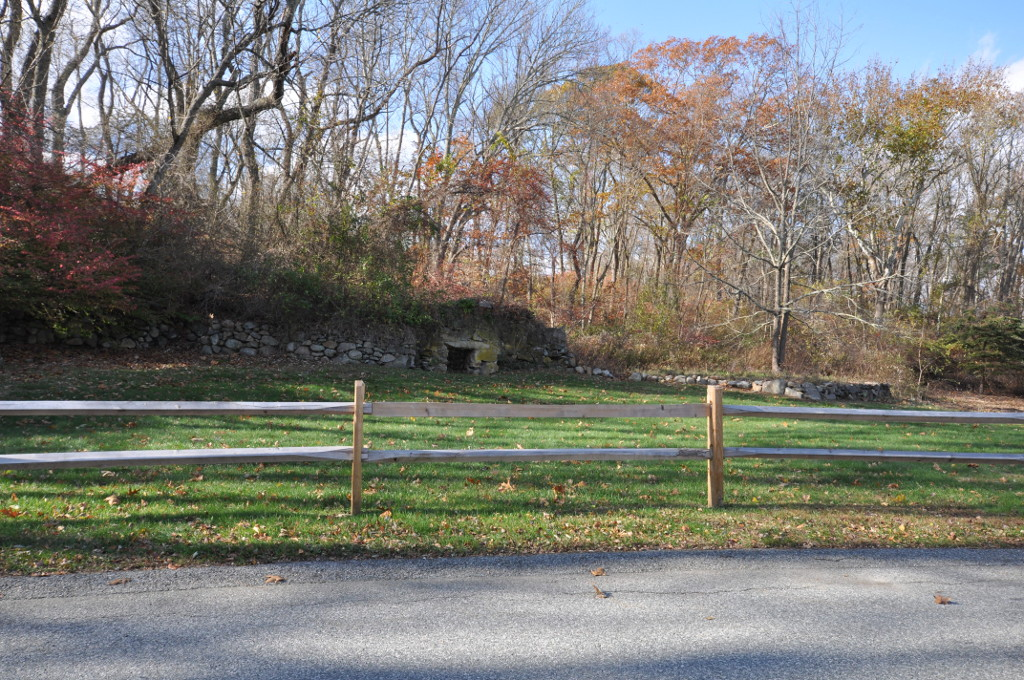
- Location: North Kingstown, Rhode Island
- NRHP reference No.: 85000790
- Added to NRHP: April 11, 1985

The Scrabbletown Historic and Archeological District in a historic district in North Kingstown, Rhode Island.

The district was added to the National Register of Historic Places in 1985.

== See also ==
- National Register of Historic Places listings in Washington County, Rhode Island
