= Shady Lea Historic District =

Historic district in Rhode Island, United States

- U.S. National Register of Historic Places
- U.S. Historic district
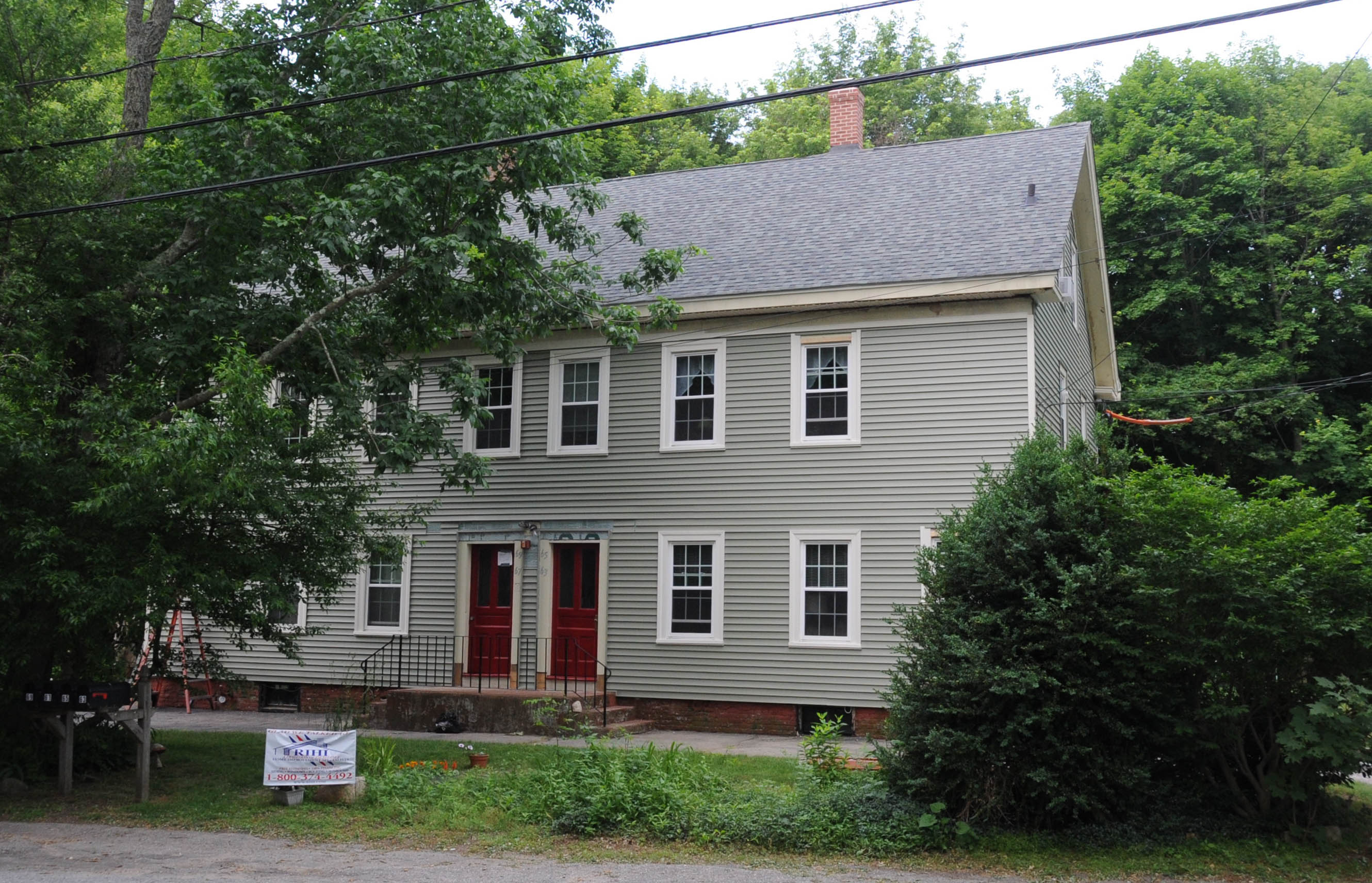
- Mill workers' housing

- Location within Rhode Island Location within the United States
- Location: North Kingstown, Rhode Island
- Coordinates: 41°32′7″N 71°27′56″W
- Area: 18 acres (7.3 ha)
- Built: 1870
- Architect: Multiple
- Architectural style: Gothic, Federal
- MPS: North Kingstown MRA
- NRHP reference No.: 85001644
- Added to NRHP: July 19, 1985

The Shady Lea Historic District is a historic district on Shady Lea and Tower Hill Roads in North Kingstown, Rhode Island. It encompasses a predominantly residential linear district extending along Shady Lea Road southward from Tower Hill Road. Most of the houses along Shady Lea Road are mill worker housing built in the 19th century for workers at the mill complex which stands at the edge of the Shady Lea Mill Pond, at the southern end of the district. This area is a well-preserved example of the numerous rural mill complexes which dotted the Rhode Island countryside in the 19th century.

The district was listed on the National Register of Historic Places in 1985.

== See also ==
- National Register of Historic Places listings in Washington County, Rhode Island
