= Old Narragansett Cemetery =

Historic cemetery in Washington County, Rhode Island, US

- U.S. National Register of Historic Places
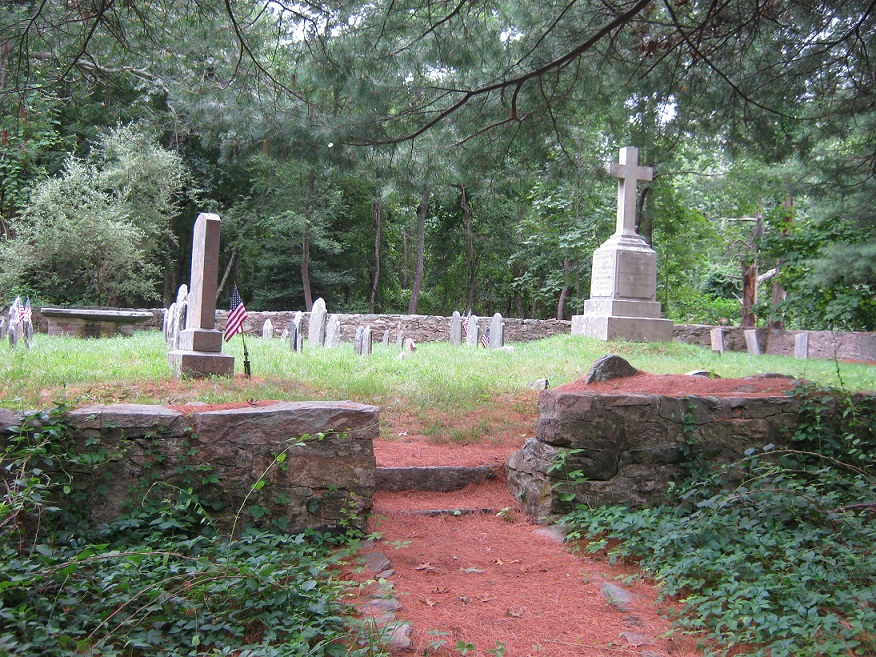
- Old Narragansett Episcopal Cemetery

- Location within Rhode Island Location within the United States
- Location: North Kingstown, Rhode Island
- Coordinates: 41°31′10″N 71°28′42″W
- Area: 1.2 acres (0.49 ha)
- MPS: North Kingstown MRA
- NRHP reference No.: 85001655
- Added to NRHP: July 19, 1985

The Old Narragansett Cemetery is an historic cemetery on Shermantown Road in North Kingstown, Rhode Island. Variant names for the cemetery include Narragansett Cemetery, Platform Cemetery, and The Platform Cemetery. The cemetery occupies a 1.2 acres (0.49 ha) plot about 300 feet (91 m) south of Shermantown Road, roughly midway between its two junctions with Mourning Dove Drive. It was established early in the 18th century, and is one of North Kingstown's oldest and longest-used cemeteries. It has 110 marked graves, and was used from its establishment c. 1705 to the 1880s. The most prominent memorials are to James MacSparran and Samuel Fayerweather, two long-serving ministers at the Old Narragansett Church, which stood nearby when it was built in 1706.

The cemetery was added to the National Register of Historic Places in 1985.

== See also ==
- National Register of Historic Places listings in Washington County, Rhode Island
