= George Douglas House =

Historic house in Rhode Island, United States

- U.S. National Register of Historic Places
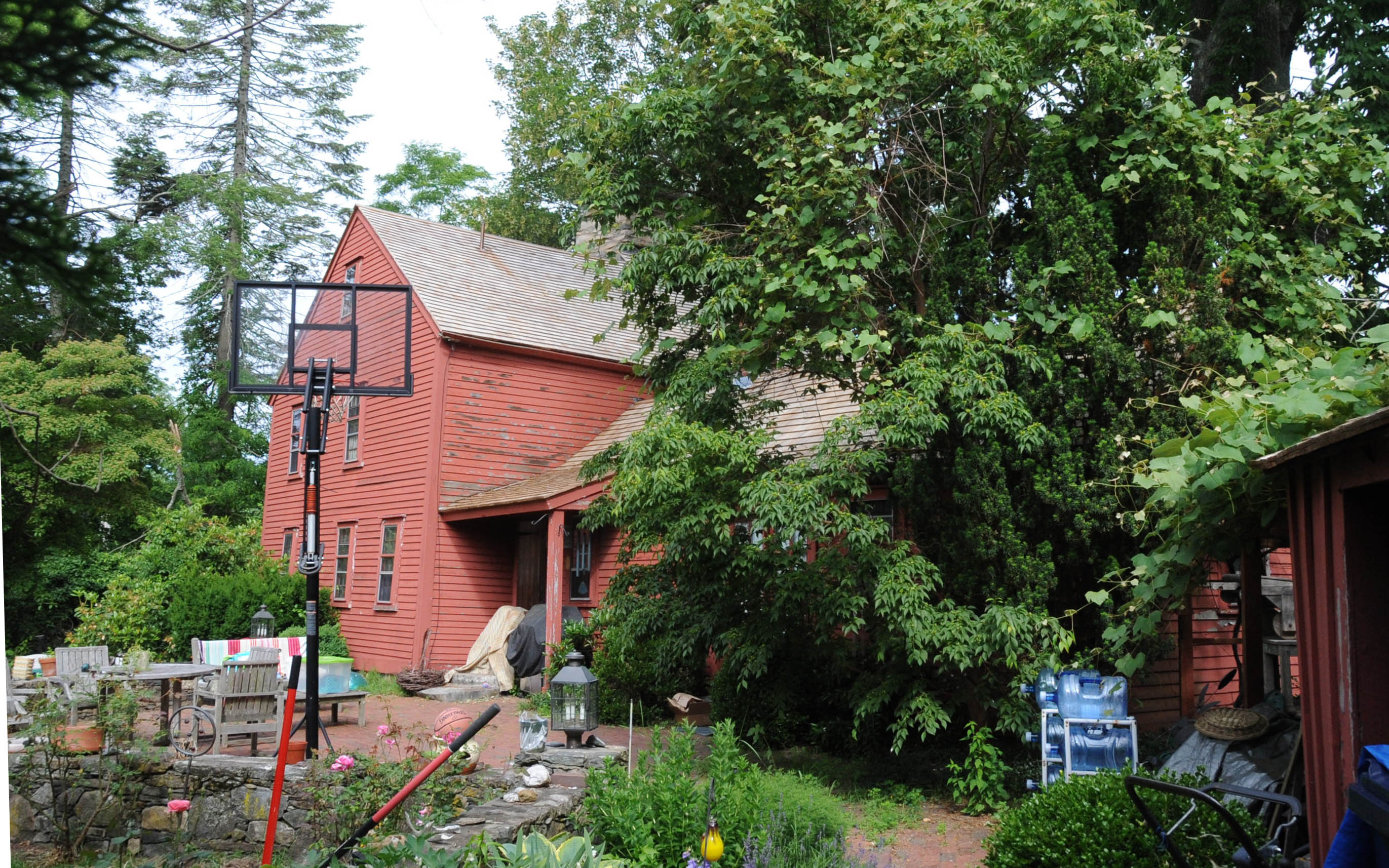

- Location within Rhode Island Location within the United States
- Location: North Kingstown, Rhode Island
- Coordinates: 41°31′18″N 71°27′46″W
- Built: 1738
- NRHP reference No.: 75000006
- Added to NRHP: October 10, 1975

The George Douglas House is an historic house at Tower Hill and Gilbert Stuart Roads in North Kingstown, Rhode Island. Its oldest section dated to the 1730s, it is one of a small number of surviving colonial-era stone ender houses in the state. This original block is three bays wide and two stories high, with a massive fieldstone chimney at its north end. Its exterior ornamentation is minimal, limited to pilasters on either side of the main entrance, and a triangular pediment above. A small kitchen ell was added to the north side (next to the chimney, which remains exposed), probably early in the 19th century, and a bedroom further extended this ell in the 1940s.

The house was listed on the National Register of Historic Places in 1975.

== See also ==
- National Register of Historic Places listings in Washington County, Rhode Island
