= David S. Baker Estate =

Historic house in Rhode Island, United States

- U.S. National Register of Historic Places
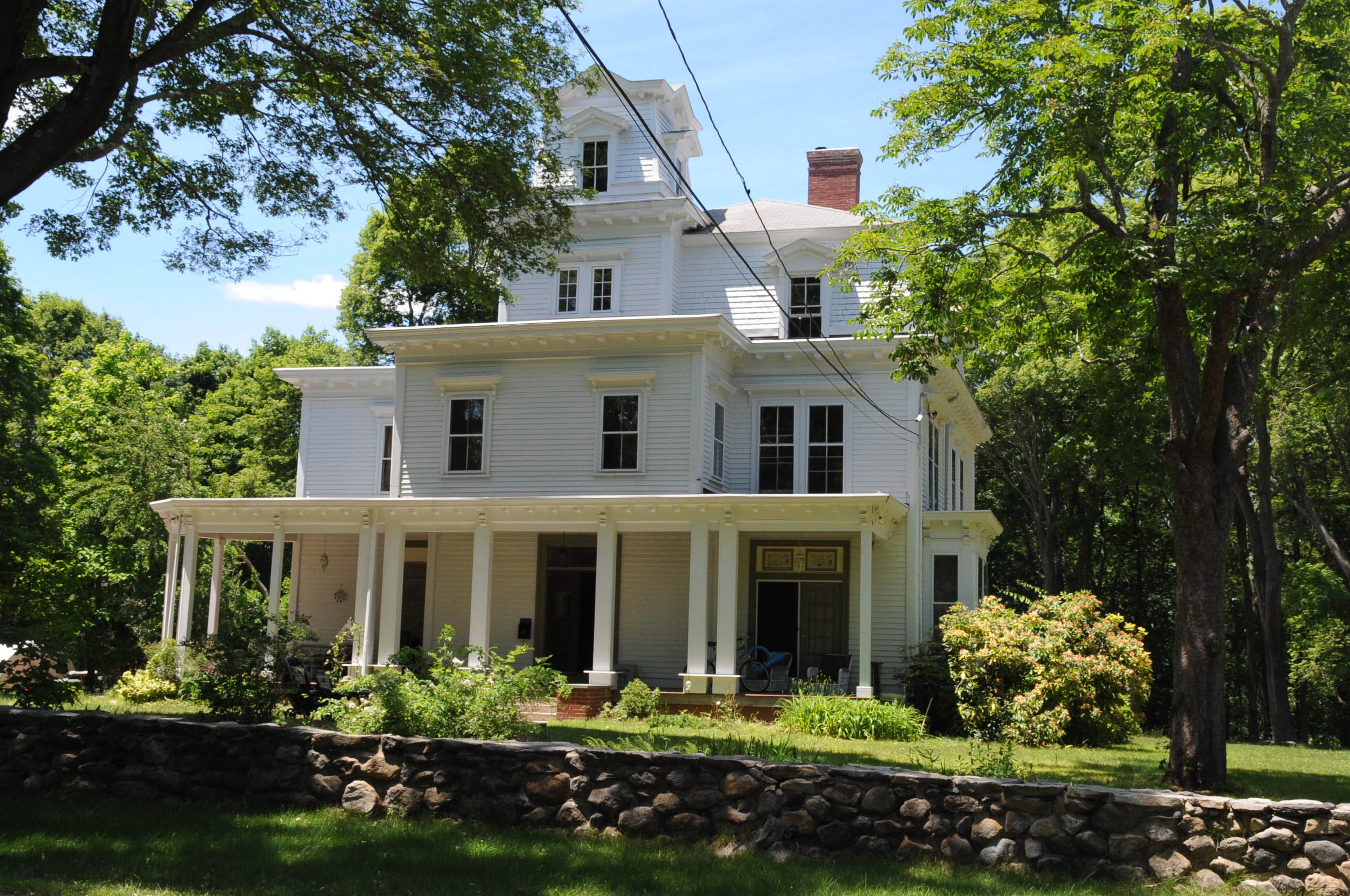

- Location within Rhode Island Location within the United States
- Interactive map showing the location for David S. Baker Estate
- Location: 51 & 67 Prospect Ave., North Kingstown, Rhode Island
- Coordinates: 41°33′54″N 71°27′11″W
- Built: 1883
- Architectural style: Italianate; Second Empire
- NRHP reference No.: 11000512
- Added to NRHP: August 4, 2011

The David S. Baker Estate, also known as Cedar Spring Farm, consists of a pair of related properties at 51 and 67 Prospect Avenue in the Wickford village of North Kingstown, Rhode Island. David Sherman Baker, Jr., a prominent local lawyer and contender for statewide offices built the house around 1882 with his wife. Members of the Baker family built the Italianate, the older of the two houses, 51 Prospect Avenue, which is a 1 1/2 story mansard-roofed that is modest in size but features an elaborate wrap around veranda decorated in fairly elaborated Italianate and Second Empire styling. The house at 67 Prospect is much larger 2 1/2 story construction, with a 3 1/2 story tower and front veranda, again in eclectic Second Empire style. It is one of the largest houses in Wickford, and was referred to by the family as the "Big House". It is unclear whether Baker built the Big House to accommodate his growing family, or as a venue for functions that were part of his political and social activities.

The properties were listed on the National Register of Historic Places in 2011.

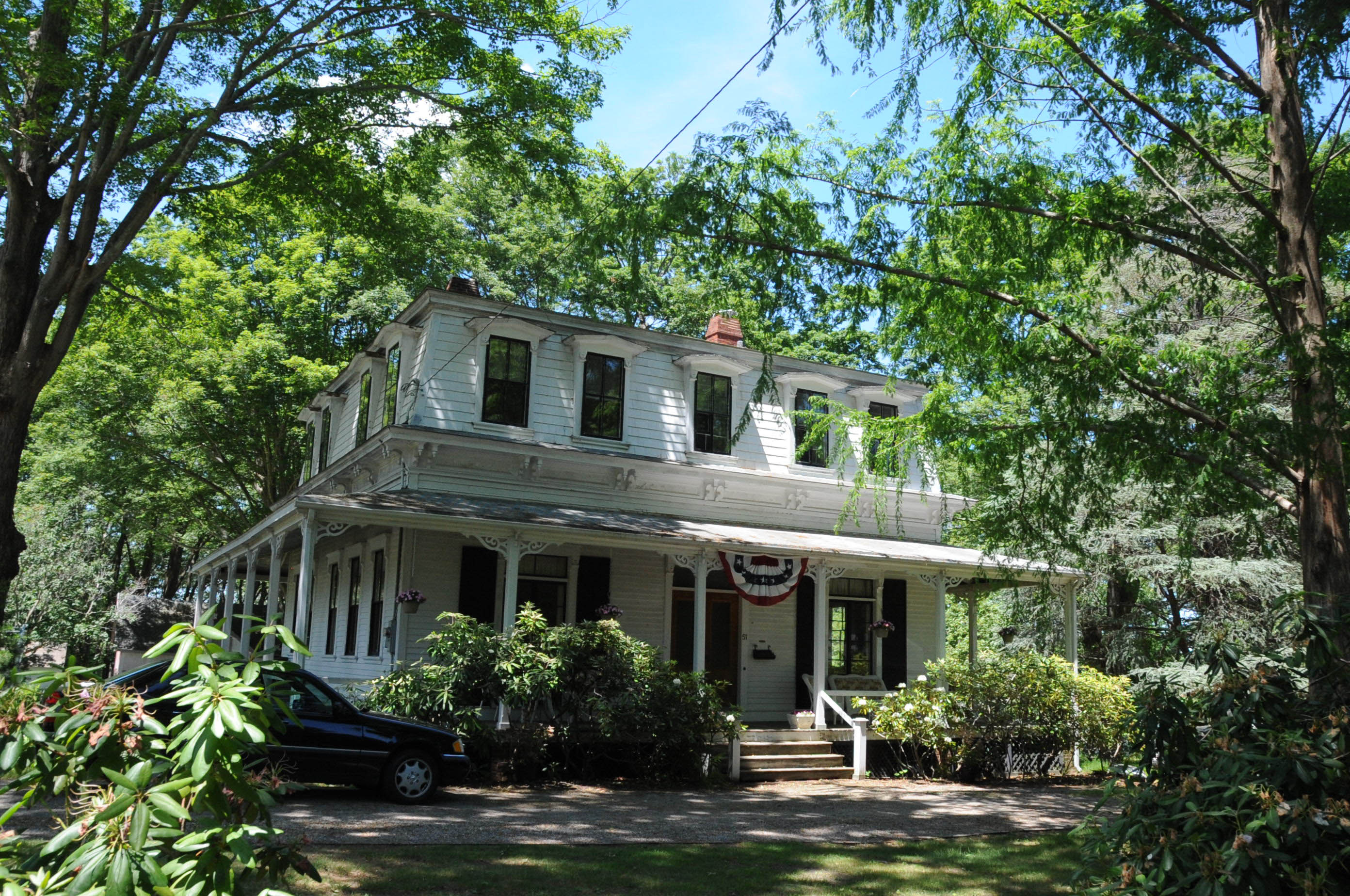
Older house

== See also ==
- National Register of Historic Places listings in Washington County, Rhode Island
