= YWCA Site =

- U.S. National Register of Historic Places
- Nearest city: North Kingstown, Rhode Island
- NRHP reference No.: 80000027
- Added to NRHP: November 20, 1980

The YWCA Site is an archaeological site in North Kingstown, Rhode Island.

The site was added to the National Register of Historic Places in 1980.

== See also ==
- National Register of Historic Places listings in Washington County, Rhode Island
