= Davisville Historic District =

Historic district in Rhode Island, United States

- U.S. National Register of Historic Places
- U.S. Historic district
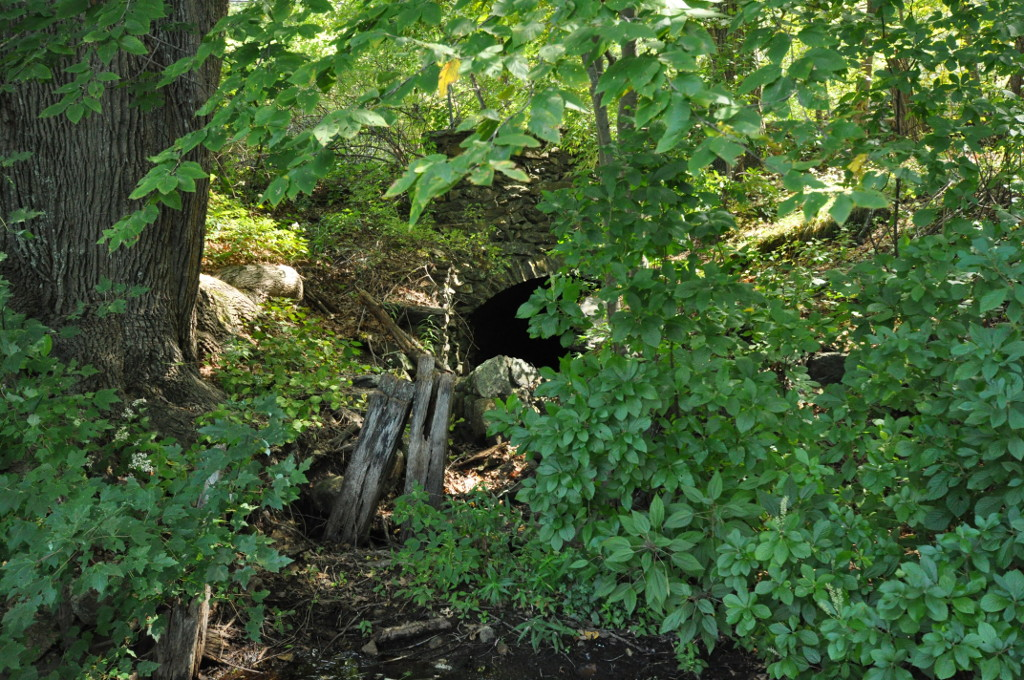
- The old mill race

- Location within Rhode Island Location within the United States
- Location: North Kingstown, Rhode Island
- Coordinates: 41°37′17″N 71°28′52″W
- Area: 30 acres (12 ha)
- Architect: Multiple
- Architectural style: Greek Revival, Gothic, Federal
- MPS: North Kingstown MRA
- NRHP reference No.: 85001645
- Added to NRHP: July 19, 1985

The Davisville Historic District is a historic district on Davisville Road in Davisville, Rhode Island, a village in North Kingstown. It encompasses the site of an early 19th-century mill, and several associated buildings, including five houses dating to the 18th or 19th century and a cemetery. It is located on either side of Davisville Road, between the Hunt River and Olde Mill Lane.

The district was listed on the National Register of Historic Places in 1985.

== See also ==
- National Register of Historic Places listings in Washington County, Rhode Island
