= Plum Beach Light =

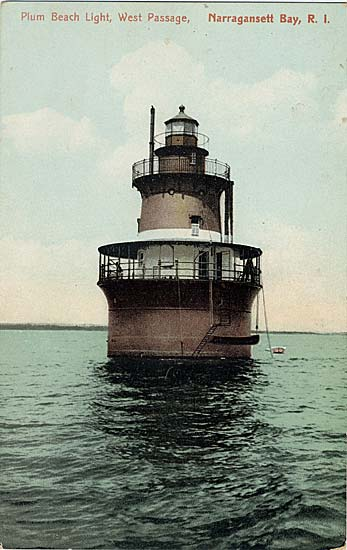
- Plum Beach Light ca. 1910
- Location: Narragansett Bay north of the Jamestown Verrazzano Bridge
- Coordinates: 41.5303°N 71.4052°W

Tower
- Constructed: 1897
- Foundation: Iron caisson
- Construction: Cast iron/concrete
- Height: 16 m (52 ft)
- Shape: conical "sparkplug" tower
- Heritage: National Register of Historic Places listed place

Light
- First lit: 2003
- Deactivated: 1941
- Focal height: 16.5 m (54 ft)
- Characteristic: Fl W 5s
- Plum Beach Lighthouse
- U.S. National Register of Historic Places
- MPS: Lighthouses of Rhode Island TR
- NRHP reference No.: 88000281
- Added to NRHP: March 30, 1988

Plum Beach Light (Lighthouse), built in 1899, is a sparkplug lighthouse in North Kingstown, Rhode Island.

The lighthouse was built using pneumatic caisson engineering. A granite base was added in 1922. The light was deactivated in 1941 when the first Jamestown Bridge was built. The light became dilapidated until 1999 when the Friends of Plum Beach Lighthouse received ownership of the lighthouse. The lighthouse is now listed on the National Register of Historic Places. In 2003 the Plum Beach Lighthouse's exterior was completely restored and its beacon re-activated soon after; it is now licensed as a Coast Guard Private Aid to Navigation. The Friends of the Plum Beach Lighthouse designed, submitted and introduced an official License Plate to be distributed to any Rhode Island private passenger registration. The extremely popular plates have sold over 7000 sets since they were released in July 2010.

== History ==
Lighthouse Construction

Construction started on Plum Beach Lighthouse in 1896. It was built using a pneumatic caisson. The lighthouse's foundation was built on shore and towed to its present location and sunk to the bottom. Once the foundation settled on the bottom, the water was pumped out and filled with air. Workers went into it and dug the dirt at the bottom of the foundation. As they removed the dirt, the foundation sunk lower in to river bottom. A core sample taken during construction discovered a seven-foot layer of quicksand at the depth the foundation was going to bottom out. Construction was stopped because the foundation had to be heightened to get past the quicksand. This required additional funding. The foundation was covered with a wooden peaked roof. A red light was placed on the unfinished foundation in 1897. Congress appropriated $9,000 in 1898 to finish it. Work was restarted in April 1899 and was finished in June 1899. It was first lighted on July 1, 1899.

=== Abandonment and declining condition ===
The Jamestown Bridge was completed in 1940, and the lighthouse soon became obsolete. In 1941, The Coast Guard officially extinguished the light on 1 May 1941. Shortly after the lighthouse was put up for bid, with the Coast Guard giving preference to those willing to demolish or move the lighthouse within 90 days. When no bids were offered, the structure was abandoned. During the following period of disuse, the lighthouse's windows and doors disappeared, and pigeons claimed it as their home. Soon, a thick layer of guano covered the floors of the lighthouse, and was no longer safe for unprotected human contact. In 1971 and 1972, a University of Rhode Island professor and graduate student began making weekly visits to the lighthouse to conduct studies on the pigeons. To protect themselves from the guano, the URI experimenters wore masks and other protective clothing. In 1971, the professor and student discovered a natural population control system used by the pigeons, in which the birds abandoned approximately 40% of their eggs each year to keep the number of births each year nearly the same. The next year, the researchers removed 20% of the eggs, and the pigeons compensated by abandoning many fewer eggs.

=== Painting efforts and lawsuit ===
Little was done to protect the lighthouse until the mid-1970s when an attempt was made to paint the structure. Because of the amount of bird droppings in the building, the painting effort ceased after one of the workers became ill from the effects of the guano. After years of ownership squabbles between the Coast Guard and the State of Rhode Island, with neither side wanting to cover the maintenance costs, the dispute was finally settled when James Osborn, a painter who had worked at the lighthouse in the 1970s, sued the state in 1984 for $500,000 as compensation for a rare disease called histoplasmosis he contracted from all the dried guano in the lighthouse. In 1998, after much time the case spent bouncing back and forth between Rhode Island's Supreme and Superior Courts, the courts decided the state owned the structure, and the state paid Osborn $42,000 three months later.

=== Private ownership and restoration ===
In 1988, a private company attempted to purchase the lighthouse and move it to a Quincy, Massachusetts, condominium development, where they would convert it to a lighthouse history museum. When this plan was made public, Portsmouth, Rhode Island resident Shirley Silvia, organized the Friends of Plum Beach Lighthouse, a nonprofit organization, with the purpose of purchasing the lighthouse, restoring it, and preserving it in its original condition and location. However, neither group was able to buy the structure due to the disputed ownership which had not yet been decided by courts. When the State of Rhode Island was given the deed to the property in 1999, they gave ownership to the Friends of Plum Beach Lighthouse. In a ceremony held at Plum Beach, the Friends' President and founder Shirley Silvia accepted the deed from Rhode Island Department of Environmental Management Director Jan Reitsma. Also in attendance were board members Dot and George Silva, and Friends vice-president Alda Kaye. In the same year, the Friends received a $500,000 grant to restore the tower under the Transportation Act for the 21st Century. In 2000, after visiting the site, the Newport Collaborative Architects gave an estimate of $955,000 to restore the entire exterior and interior of the lighthouse.

In October 2009, the Friends of Plum Beach Lighthouse received approval to offer license plates featuring an image of the lighthouse. Proceeds from the sale of the plates would be used to maintain the lighthouse, but an initial order of 900 plates was required. The Friends were able to surpass the minimum order in just eight weeks of sales, and since then over 10,000 have been sold. Revenue from the plates was used to repaint the lighthouse in 2010 and 2017.

== List of keepers and assistants ==
Keeper	years	First Assistant	years
Joseph L. Eaton	1897–1899	Arthur W. White	1899–1901
Judson G. Allen	1899–1904	John D. Davies	1901
Judson G. Allen	1899–1904	Andrew F. Smith	1901–1905
Judson G. Allen	1899–1904	Andrew F. Smith	1901–1905
George Ehrhardt	1904–1911	Andrew F. Smith	1901–1905
George Ehrhardt	1904–1911	James Joseph Bryan	1905
George Ehrhardt	1904–1911	James Edward Creed	1905–1907
George Ehrhardt	1904–1911	Walter Coppage	1907
George Ehrhardt	1904–1911	Reuben W. Phillips	1907–1908
George Ehrhardt	1904–1911	George A. Brown	1908
George Ehrhardt	1904–1911	J. H. Royle	1908
George Ehrhardt	1904–1911	Alfred Nelson	1909
George Ehrhardt	1904–1911	Arthur J. Baldwin	1910
George Ehrhardt	1904–1911	Benjamin G. Barber	1910–1911
George Troy	1911–1913	George Doige	1911–1912
George Troy	1911–1913	James H. Bentley	1913
Charles L. Orsmby	1913–1935	John A. Miller	1914–1916
Charles L. Orsmby	1913–1935	John H. Boldt	1916
Charles L. Orsmby	1913–1935	Edward Grime	1916–1917
Charles L. Orsmby	1913–1935	George M. Wright	1918
Charles L. Orsmby	1913–1935	Dosty Robarge	1919–1929
Charles L. Orsmby	1913–1935	Reuben W. Phillips	1930–1935
Reuben W. Phillips	1935–1938	John. O. Ganze	1935–1941
unknown	1938–1941	John. O. Ganze	1935–1941

== Gallery ==
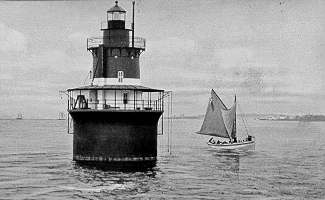
U.S. Coast Guard photo

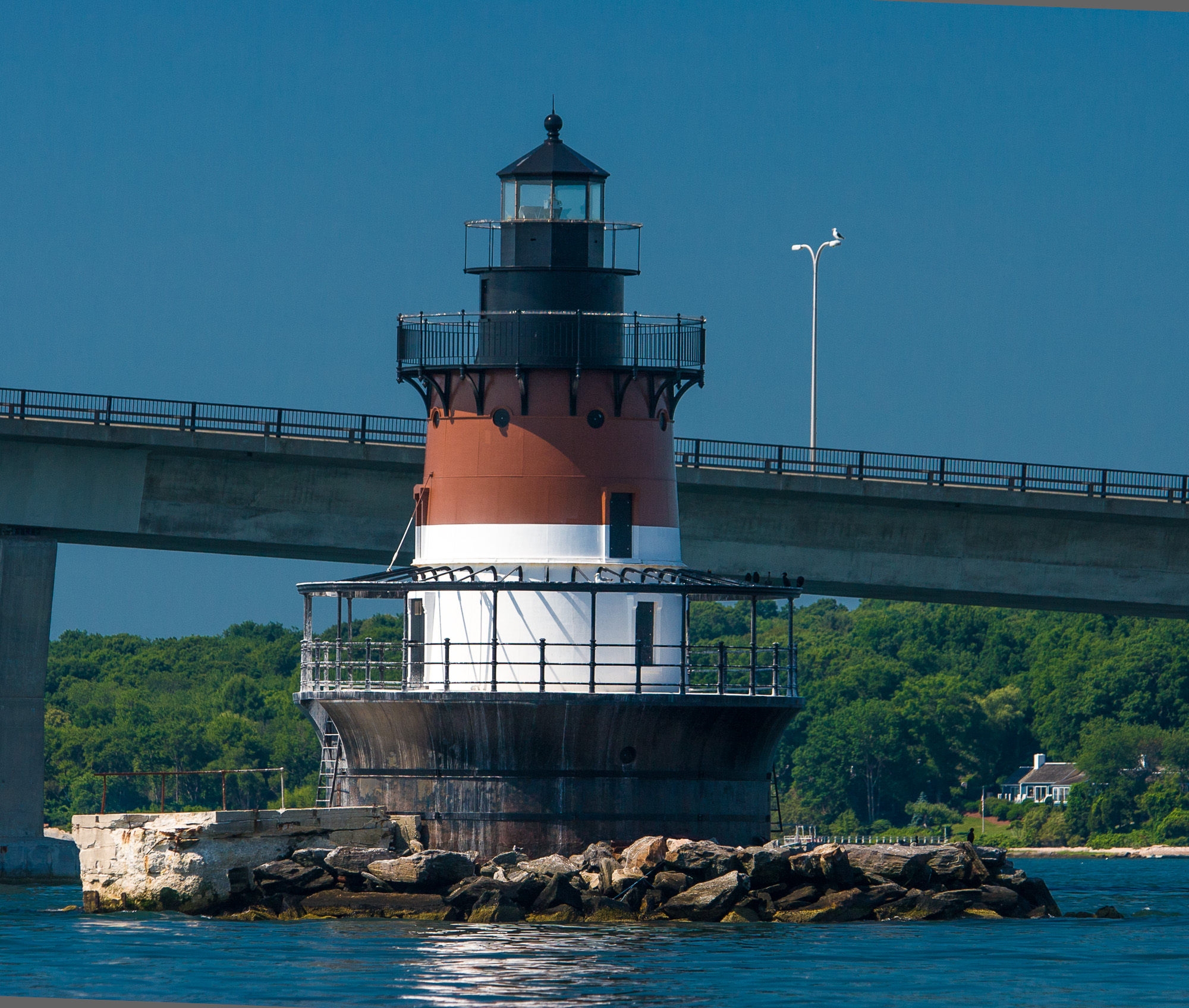
Viewed from a boat, 2007

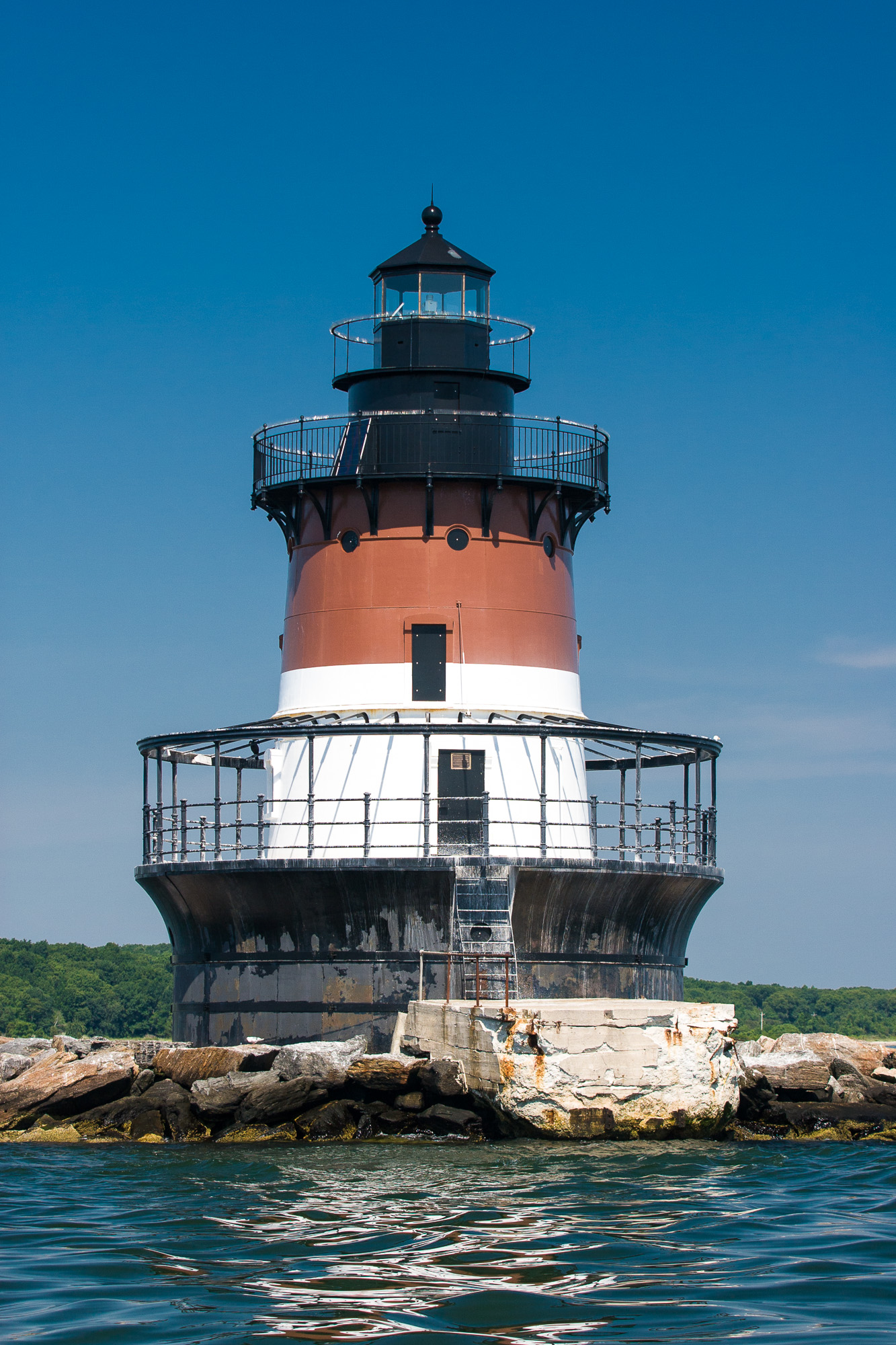
Viewed from a boat, 2007

== See also ==
- National Register of Historic Places listings in Washington County, Rhode Island

== Notes ==
- Holmes, R. "Plum Beach Lighthouse".
