= Ezekial Gardner House =

Historic house in Rhode Island, United States

- U.S. National Register of Historic Places
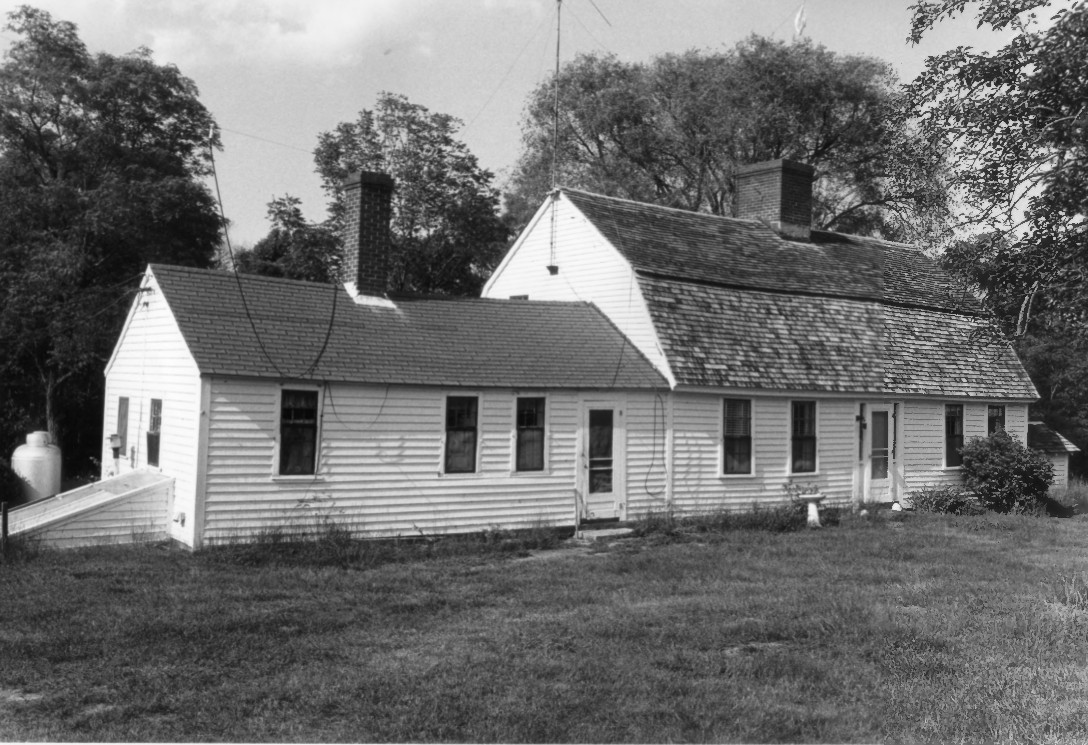
- 1981 photo

- Location within Rhode Island Location within the United States
- Location: 297 Pendar Rd., North Kingstown, Rhode Island
- Coordinates: 41°31′47″N 71°28′35″W
- Area: 97.3 acres (39.4 ha)
- Architectural style: Colonial Revival
- MPS: North Kingstown MRA
- NRHP reference No.: 85001654
- Added to NRHP: July 19, 1985

The Ezekial Gardner House was an historic house at 297 Pendar Road in North Kingstown, Rhode Island. It was a 1 1/2-story wood-frame house, with a gambrel roof. The oldest portion of the house dated to the early 18th century, and was the best-preserved of several period houses built by members of the locally prominent Gardner family. The house stood, along with an early 20th-century barn, at the end of a long tree-lined lane on the west side of Pendar Road.

The house was listed on the National Register of Historic Places in 1985. As of 2001, it had been disassembled and placed in storage.

== See also ==
- National Register of Historic Places listings in Washington County, Rhode Island
