= Esbon Sanford House =

Historic house in Rhode Island, United States

- U.S. National Register of Historic Places
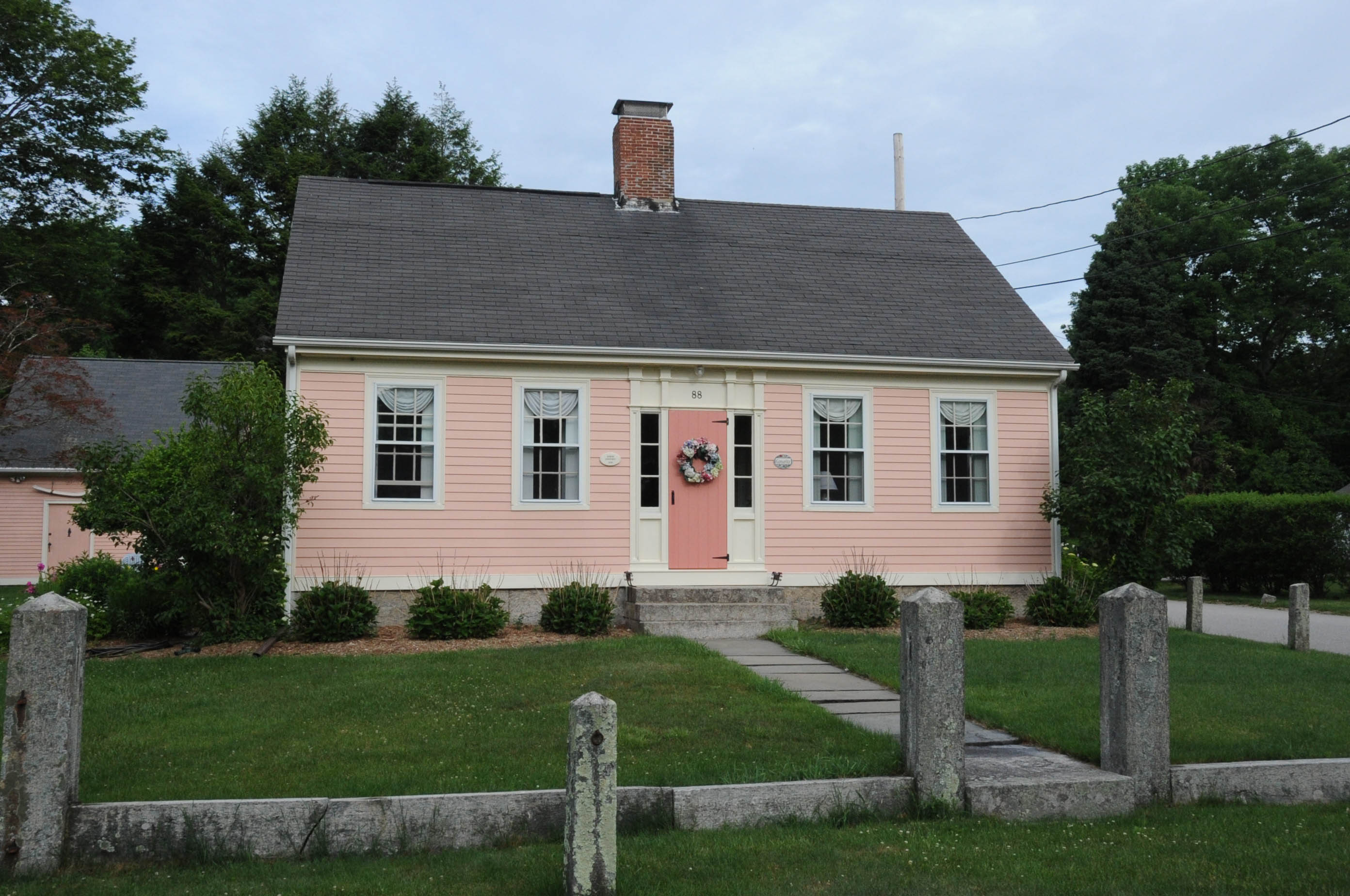

- Location within Rhode Island Location within the United States
- Location: North Kingstown, Rhode Island
- Coordinates: 41°33′4″N 71°26′55″W
- Area: less than one acre
- Built: 1832
- Architect: Sanford, Esbon
- Architectural style: Greek Revival, Federal
- MPS: North Kingstown MRA
- NRHP reference No.: 85001649
- Added to NRHP: July 19, 1985

The Esbon Sanford House is an historic house at 88 Featherbed Lane in North Kingstown, Rhode Island. It is a 1 1/2-story wood-frame structure, five bays wide, with a central chimney and simple Federal-Greek Revival transitional styling. The main entry, centered on the front facade, is framed by small sidelight windows and pilasters, and is topped by an entablature. The most unusual feature of the house relates to its chimney: despite its central location, the interior of the house is organized in a central hall plan, with the flues of the flanking chambers rising at an angle and joining in the attic space to form the single chimney seen outside. The house was probably built in 1832 by Esbon Sanford, who established a textile mill nearby that same year.

The house was listed on the National Register of Historic Places in 1985.

== See also ==
- National Register of Historic Places listings in Washington County, Rhode Island
