= Allen–Madison House =

Historic house in Rhode Island, United States

- U.S. National Register of Historic Places
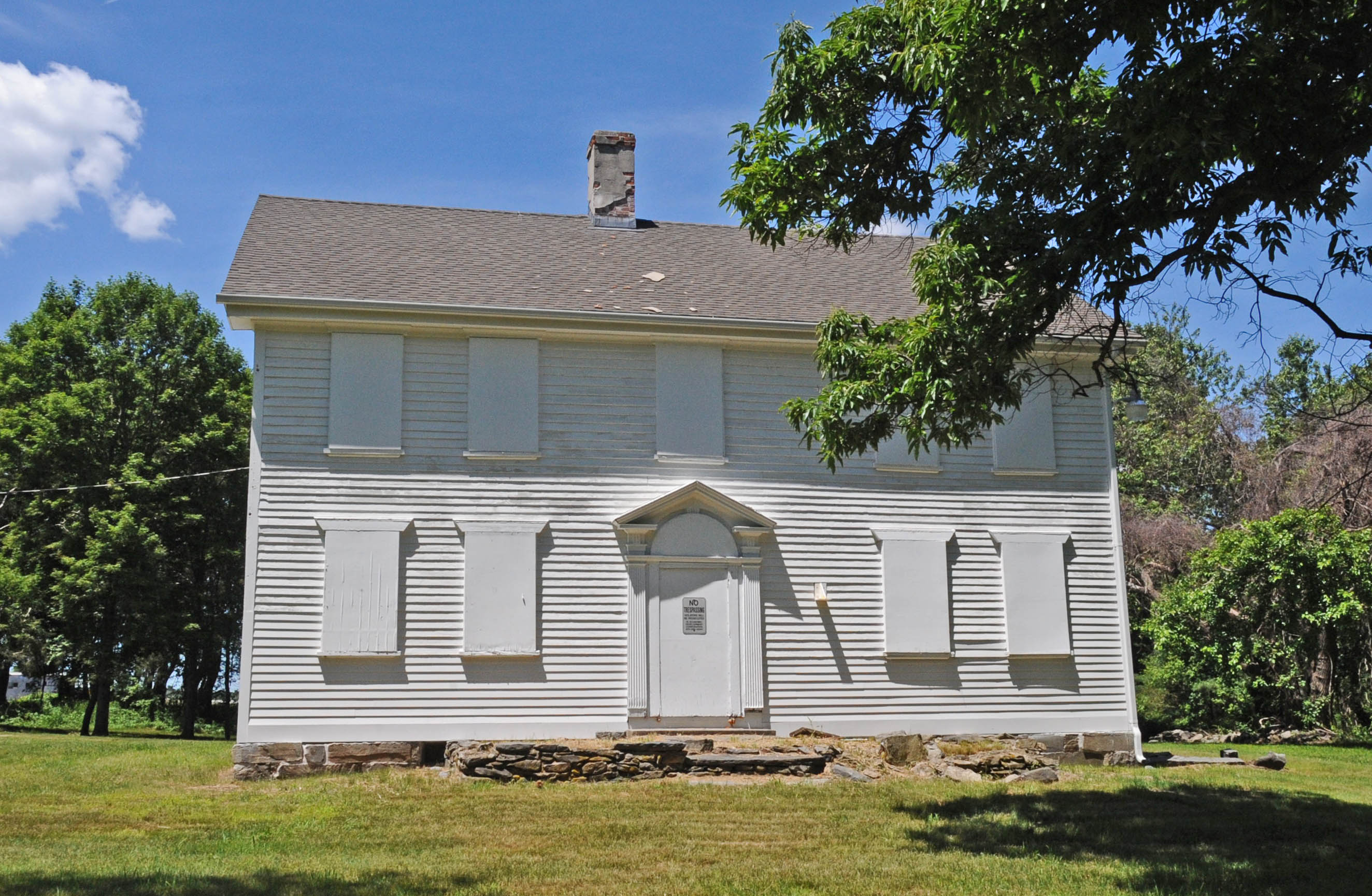

- Location within Rhode Island Location within the United States
- Interactive map showing the location for Allen-Madison House
- Location: Marine Road, North Kingstown, Rhode Island
- Coordinates: 41°37′6″N 71°25′16″W
- Built: c. 1801
- Architectural style: Federal
- NRHP reference No.: 80000015
- Added to NRHP: March 28, 1980

The Allen–Madison House (designated Quarters A (Building D-272) by the United States Navy) is a historic house on Marine Road in North Kingstown, Rhode Island. It is located on the grounds of the former Davisville Naval Construction Battalion Center, set on an isolated plot apart from the main portion of the base.

== Description and history ==
The house is a 2 1/2-story, wood-framed structure, built in about 1801 by John Allen. The house Allen built is a replacement for an older house which was burned by British forces during the American Revolutionary War. It is five bays wide, with a large central chimney, and a centered entrance with modest Federal trim. A four-bay ell, also a 19th-century construction, extends to the rear (north), and there is also a screened sitting porch. The farm was owned by members of the Madison family from about 1825 to 1909, and was acquired by the Navy in 1941. The Battalion Center was closed in 1974.

== John Allen ==
During the Revolutionary War, when Newport was occupied by British forces and the shores of the Bay were held by American forces, John Allen carried supplies to the Colonial Army on the Tiverton shore and served for a time as an enlisting officer in East Greenwich. Coastal settlements were vulnerable to attack, and in early June 1779, a British landing force captured Allen and held him captive in Newport for 18 weeks, burning his house and another nearby residence. Allen moved to East Greenwich, while still running his Quidnessett farm, built this current house in 1801, and returned with his family. Allen served on the Rhode Island Supreme Court, and died in 1813.

The house was listed on the National Register of Historic Places on March 28, 1980.

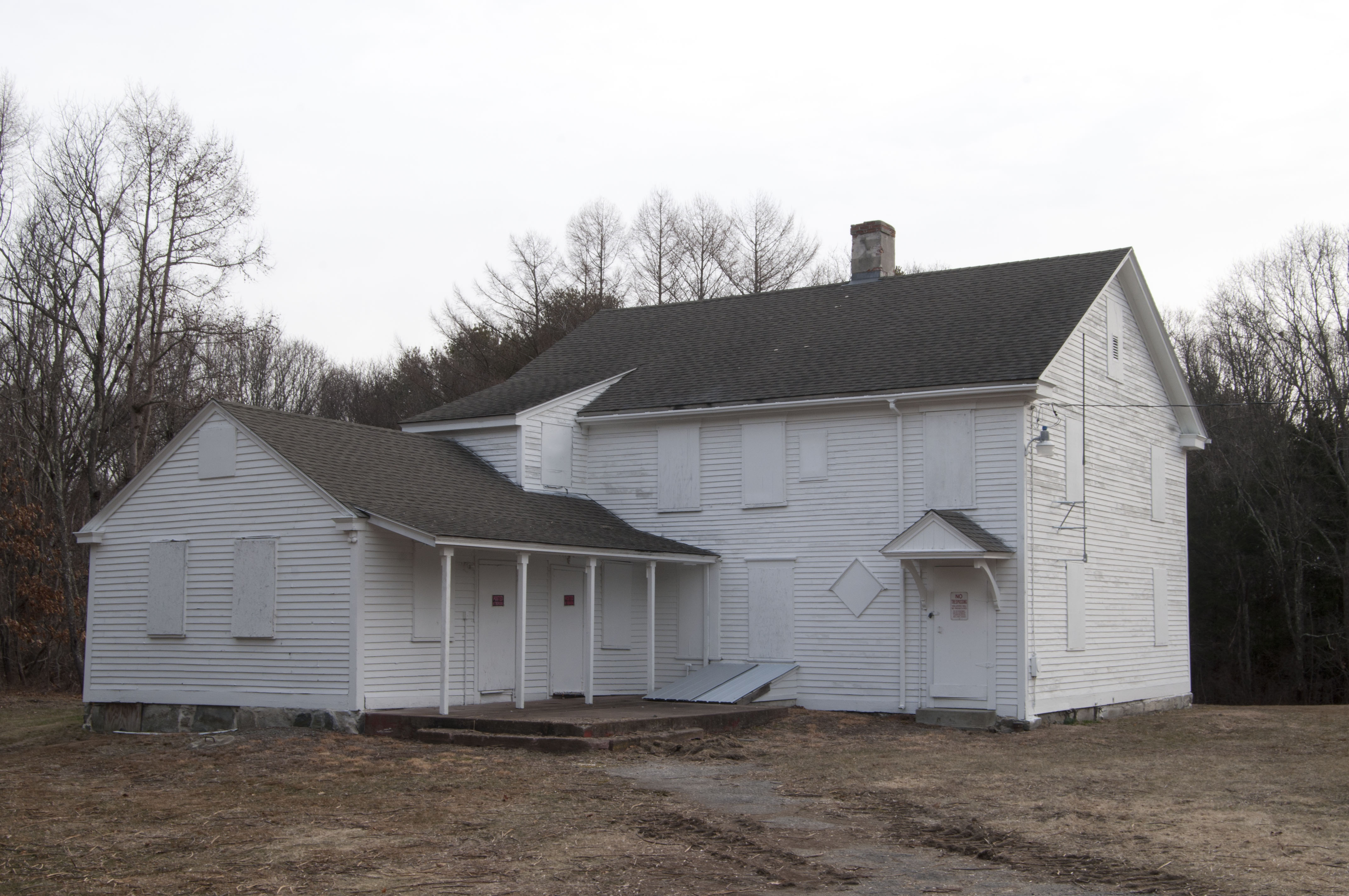

== See also ==
- National Register of Historic Places listings in Washington County, Rhode Island
