= Hamilton Mill Village Historic District =

Historic district in Rhode Island, United States

- U.S. National Register of Historic Places
- U.S. Historic district
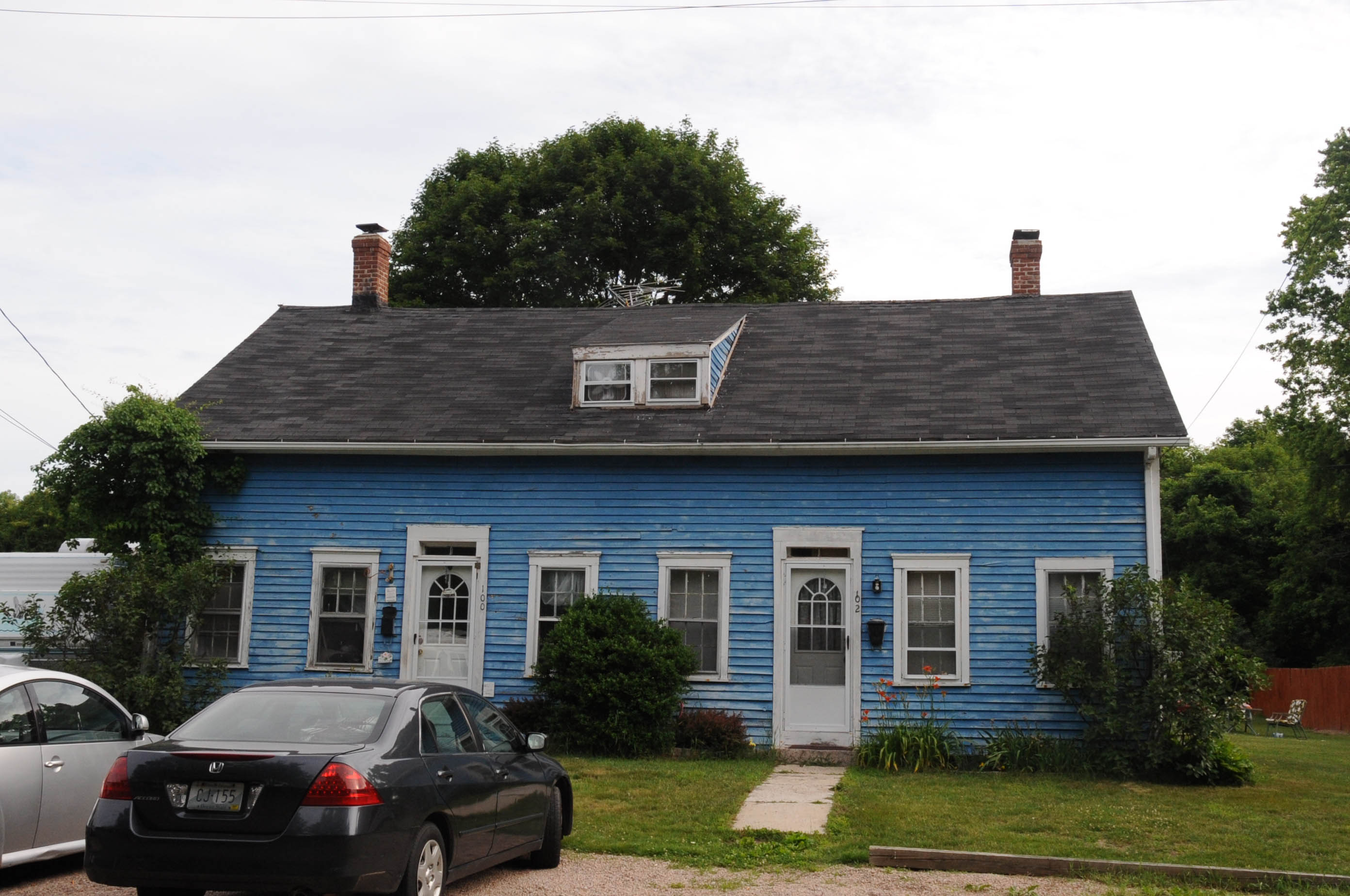

- Location within Rhode Island Location within the United States
- Location: North Kingstown, Rhode Island
- Coordinates: 41°32′56″N 71°26′19″W
- Area: 30 acres (12 ha)
- Built: 1838
- NRHP reference No.: 83003874
- Added to NRHP: November 3, 1983

The Hamilton Mill Village Historic District is a historic district encompassing a small mill village in North Kingstown, Rhode Island. It is located on the south side of the Annaquatucket River, near its mouth at Bissell Cove. The village includes two wood-frame mill buildings and a collection of mill worker housing units, which line a short section of Boston Neck Road as well as Salisbury Avenue, Web Avenue, and Martha Road. The most impressive mill building is the main mill, built in 1853 and enlarged in 1866 with a double clerestory roof, something not found in other surviving mills in the state.

The district was added to the National Register of Historic Places in 1983.

== See also ==
- National Register of Historic Places listings in Washington County, Rhode Island
