= Crowfield Historic District =

Historic district in Rhode Island, United States

- U.S. National Register of Historic Places
- U.S. Historic district
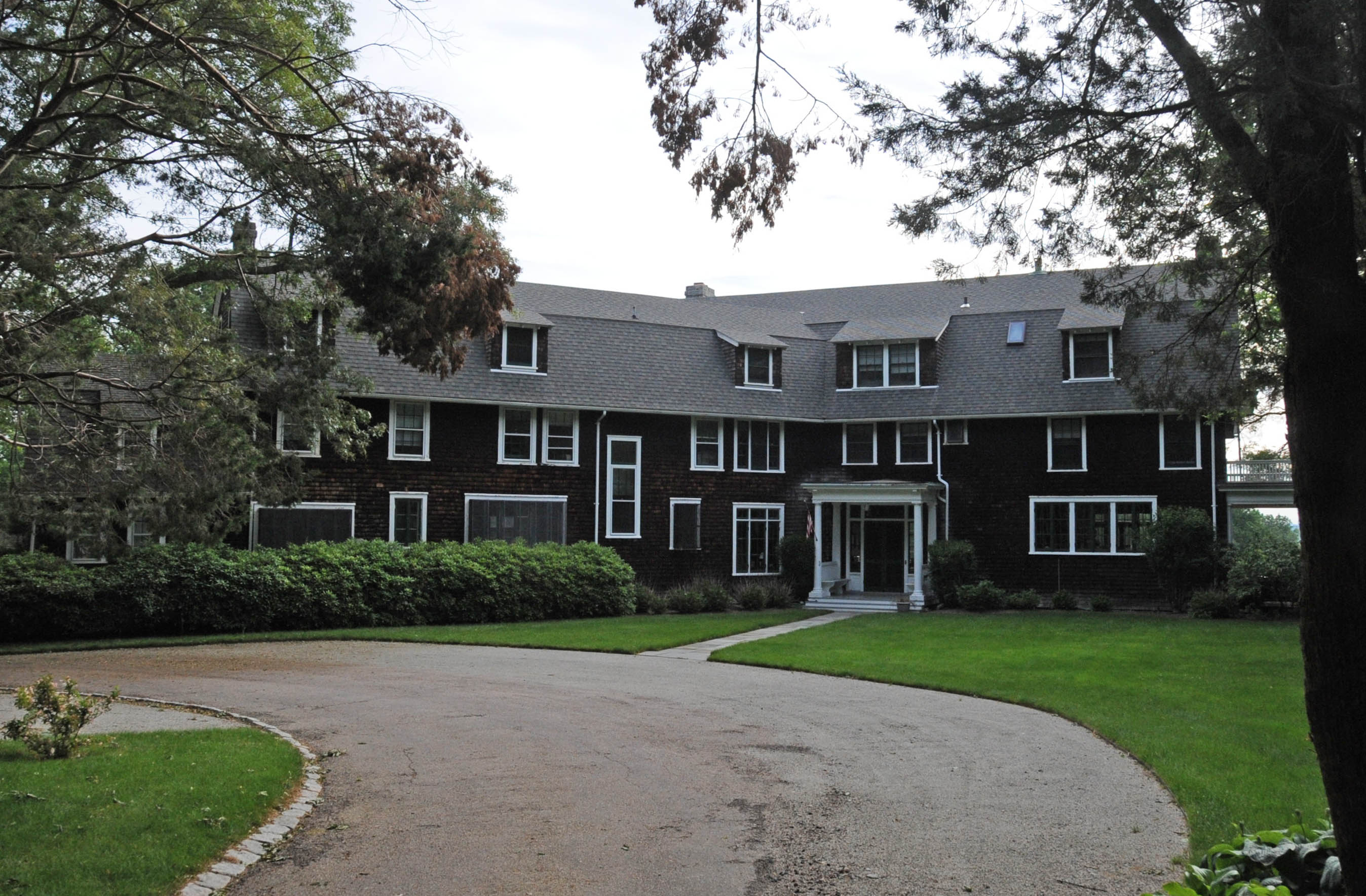

- Location within Rhode Island Location within the United States
- Location: North Kingstown, Rhode Island
- Coordinates: 41°32′0″N 71°25′27″W
- Area: 56.3 acres (22.8 ha)
- Built: 1906
- Architect: Multiple
- Architectural style: Shingle Style
- MPS: North Kingstown MRA
- NRHP reference No.: 85001646
- Added to NRHP: July 19, 1985

The Crowfield Historic District is a small residential historic district in North Kingstown, Rhode Island. It encompasses a cluster of four early 20th-century summer houses, all connected via family or friendship connections to the writer Owen Wister. The occupy a large parcel of land sloping down to the shore of Narragansett Bay on the east side of Boston Neck Road, a short way north of the Jamestown Verrazzano Bridge. The area was named "Crowfield" by Elizabeth Middleton Cope, who built a Shingle-style mansion in 1906. Owen Wister, her uncle, built his house, Champ de Corbeau, in 1909-10 to a design by Grant Lafarge. The Jamieson House was also built in 1906, and was designed by the same architect, James P. Jamieson. The fourth house, Orchard House, was built in 1924. All are Shingle style houses. The compound is unusual for North Kingstown, where most summer estates were isolated individual properties.

The district was listed on the National Register of Historic Places in 1985.

== See also ==
- National Register of Historic Places listings in Washington County, Rhode Island
