= James Edward Arnold =

American businessman

James Edward "Jim" Arnold (May 7, 1939 – October 4, 2007) was a prominent American businessman. Arnold was one of Pirelli North America's last presidents and was also the president of Bohn Aluminum and a major consultant to Wicks (a group most famous for its ownership of the Lowe's hardware chain).

== Professional career ==
At the age of seventeen Arnold joined the United States Army; he quickly rose to a position in the Green Berets (a part of the U.S. Special Forces) after service and training in the Army Airborne. Arnold served in the Korean War and part of the Vietnam War before leaving the army.

Following his service in the army, Arnold began work with General Cable in California. He advanced within General Cable to its presidency after managing numerous plants. When Pirelli acquired General Cable, Arnold became head of its U.S. cable company. Upon the merger of Pirelli Cable's U.S. division with its Canadian division, Arnold became president and CEO of Pirelli North America, working in South Carolina, Michigan and New York. Arnold retired from his position as head of the company at the age of forty-two.

During his retirement, Arnold became head of Bohn Aluminum and oversaw its sale. After the conclusion of this sale, Arnold acquired and headed a number of companies (including paint and pesticide companies) as he became interested in various businesses. Arnold also worked during his official retirement as a consultant to the Wicks Group, owner of hardware chain Lowe's. In addition Arnold headed the short-lived DDM food company (a shelf-stable foods producer), of South Carolina.

== Personal life ==
Shortly after his birth, Arnold's family moved to Del Rey, California, a small agricultural town in Central California.
