= Rathbun House =

Historic house in Rhode Island, United States

- U.S. National Register of Historic Places
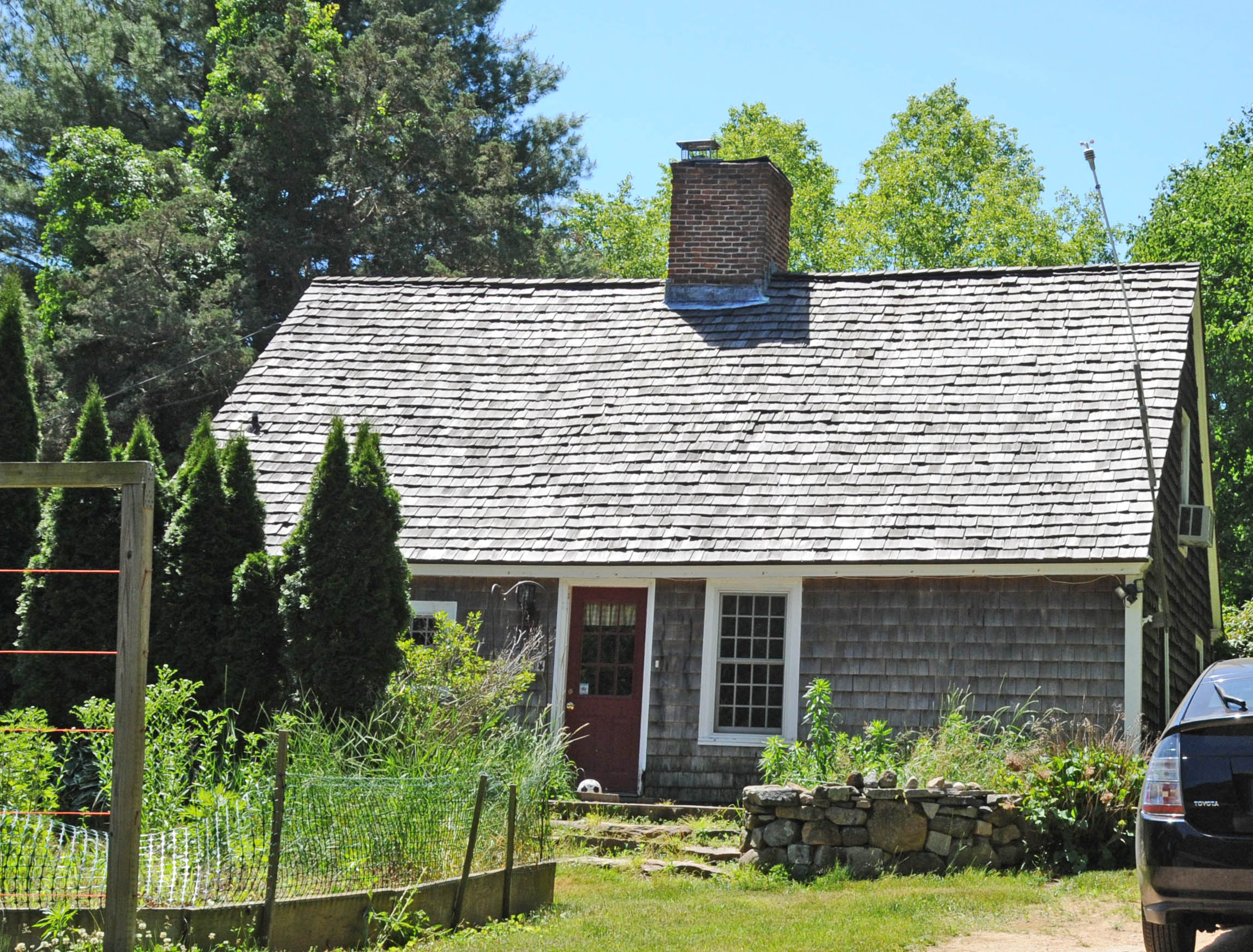

- Location within Rhode Island Location within the United States
- Location: North Kingstown, Rhode Island
- Coordinates: 41°34′20″N 71°30′20″W
- Area: less than one acre
- MPS: North Kingstown MRA
- NRHP reference No.: 85001651
- Added to NRHP: July 19, 1985

The Rathbun House is a historic house at 343 Beacon Drive in North Kingstown, Rhode Island. It is a 1 1/2-story wood-frame structure, five bays wide, with a large central chimney. Its exterior trim is simple and lacking in significant detailing. The interior plan is a typical five-room setup, with a narrow entry hall, two rooms on either side of the chimney, and the kitchen behind. It is one of a small number of surviving mid-18th century farmhouses in the town. It was probably one of four houses built in the area by members of the Rathbun family.

The house was listed on the National Register of Historic Places in 1985.

== See also ==
- National Register of Historic Places listings in Washington County, Rhode Island
