= Spink Farm =

- U.S. National Register of Historic Places
- U.S. Historic district
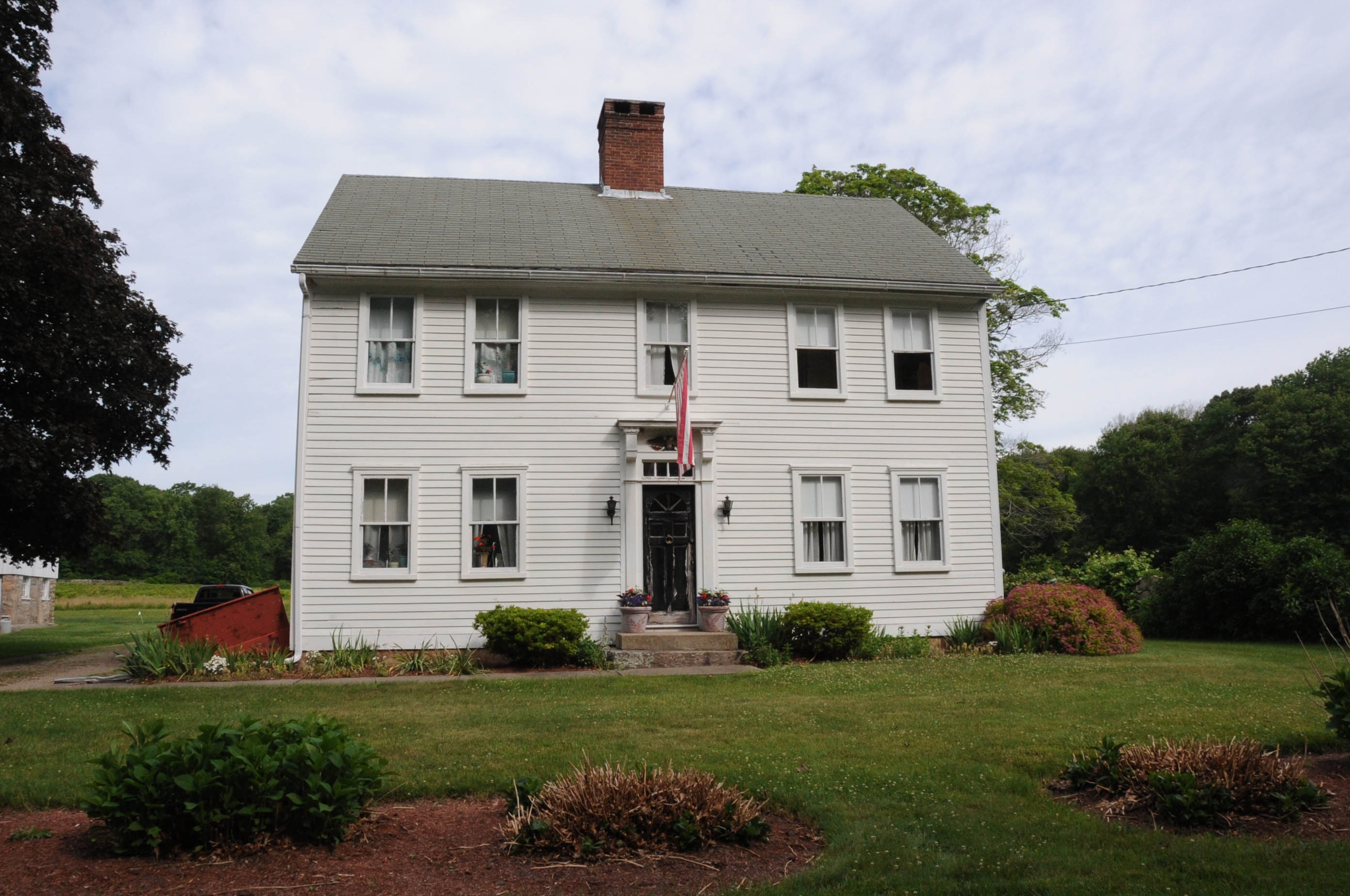
- Location: North Kingstown, Rhode Island
- Area: 55 acres (22 ha)
- Built: 1798
- Architect: Isaac Spink
- MPS: North Kingstown MRA
- NRHP reference No.: 85001650
- Added to NRHP: July 19, 1985

The Spink Farm is a historic farm at 1325 Shermantown Road in North Kingstown, Rhode Island. The only surviving element of the farmstead on this 55-acre (22 ha) farm is the main house, a 2 1/2-story five-bay wood-frame structure built in 1798 by Isaac Spink. The house exhibits modest Federal styling, its doorway flanked by small sidelight windows and simple pilasters, and topped by a shallow hood. The interior follows a typical center-chimney plan, with its original Federal period fireplace mantels intact. The house has been extended to the rear by a kitchen ell and porch, both added in the 20th century. The house is one of a small number of 18th-century farmsteads left in the town.

The farm was listed on the National Register of Historic Places in 1985.

== See also ==
- National Register of Historic Places listings in Washington County, Rhode Island
