= Palmer–Northrup House =

1680 house in Rhode Island, United States

- U.S. National Register of Historic Places
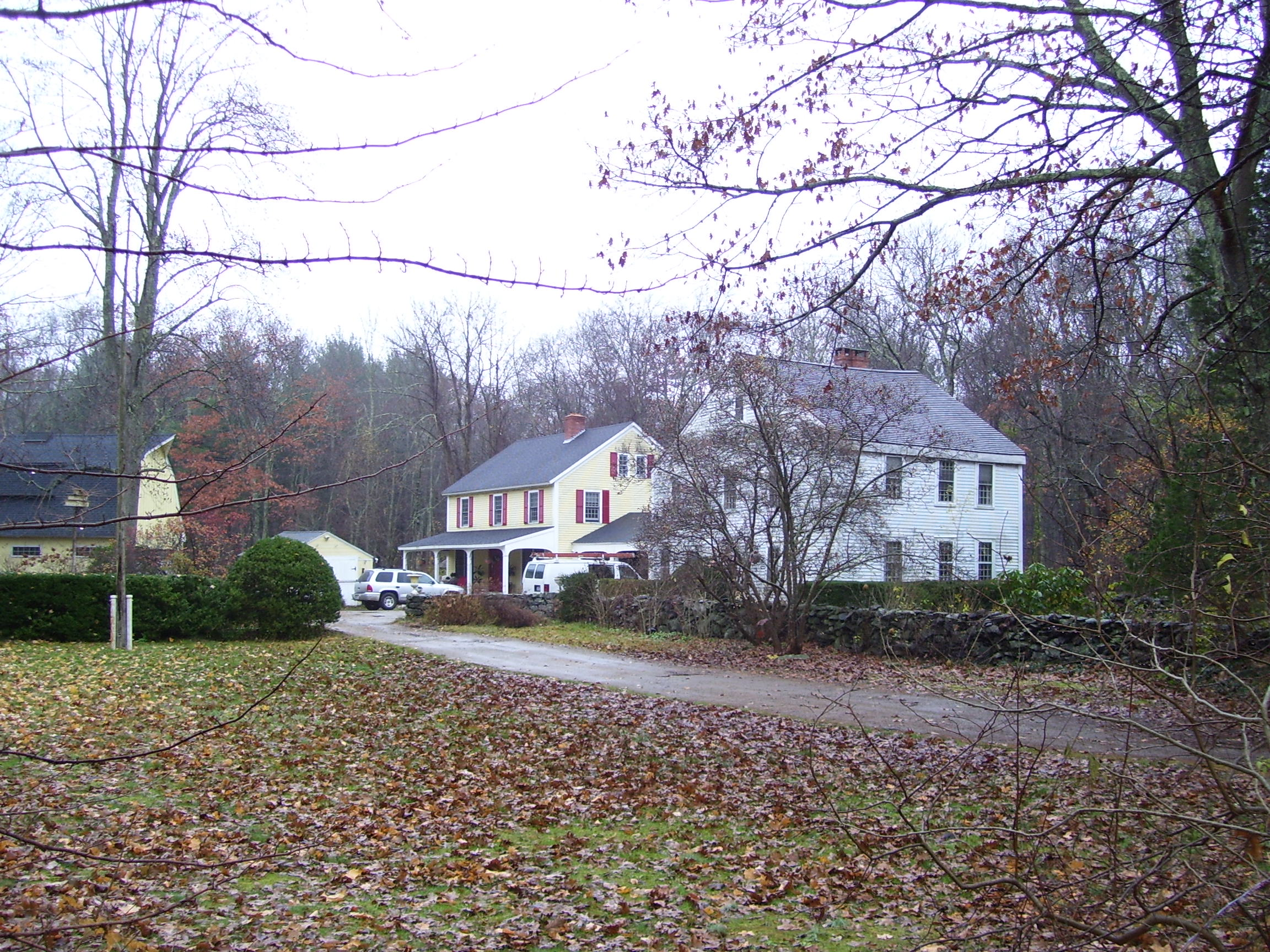
- Palmer–Northrup House in 2008

- Location within Rhode Island Location within the United States
- Location: North Kingstown, Rhode Island
- Coordinates: 41°34′37″N 71°27′40″W
- Built: 1680
- NRHP reference No.: 73000010
- Added to NRHP: April 11, 1973

The Palmer–Northrup House (or "Northup House") is an historic house at 7919 Post Road in North Kingstown, Rhode Island. It is a 2 1/2-story wood-frame structure, and is one of a small number of surviving stone ender houses in the state. Its architecture suggests it was built in the 17th century, either around the time of King Philip's War (1675–1678) or possibly even earlier. The oldest portion of the house, including its massive fieldstone chimney, are relatively intact despite later additions around 1740 that significantly enlarged the house. The house stands across the street from Smith's Castle, a house of similar vintage which was built on the site of a trading post established by Roger Williams in 1637.

The house was listed on the National Register of Historic Places in 1973.

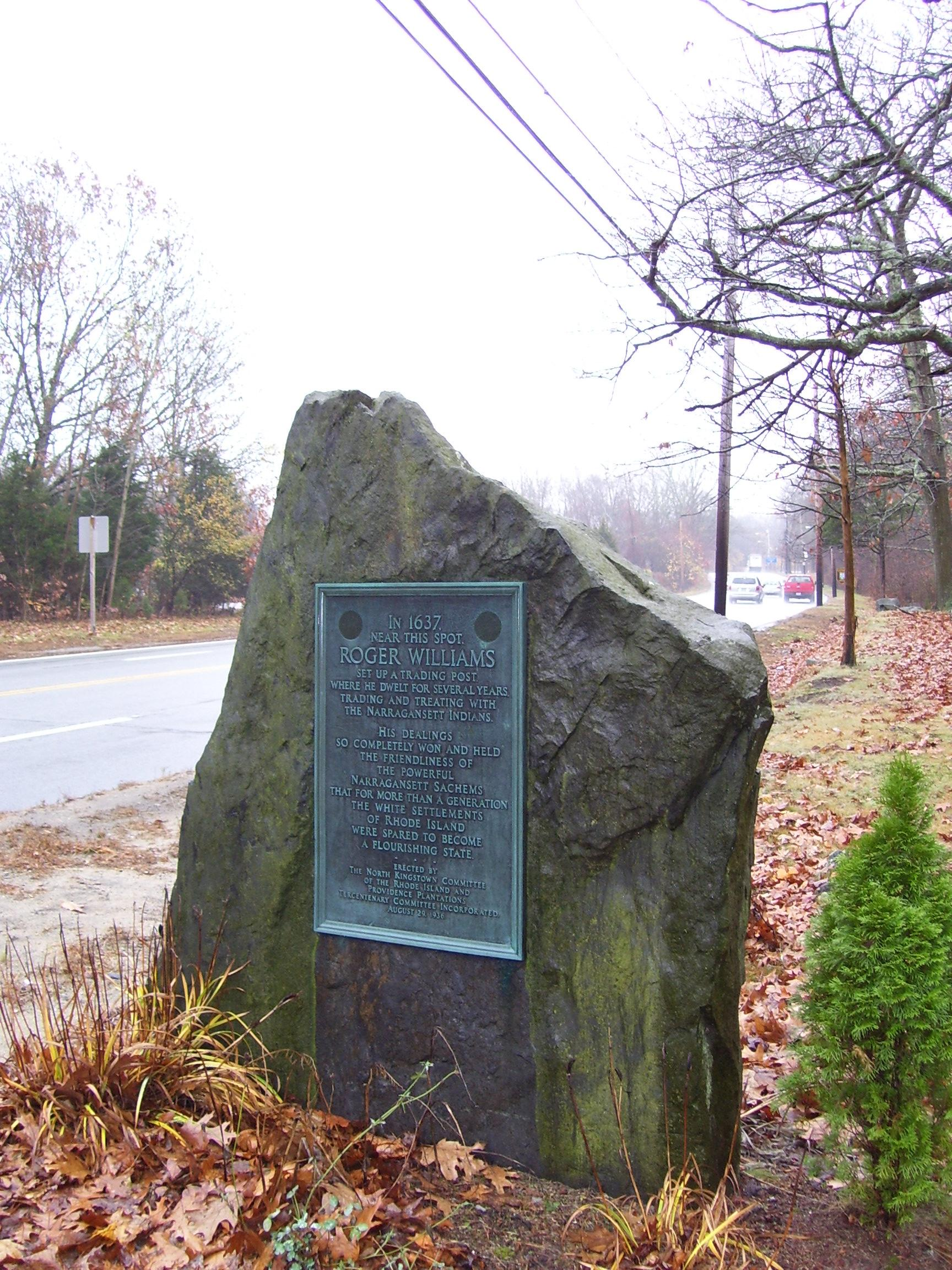
Roger Williams trading post site in front of the house on Post Road

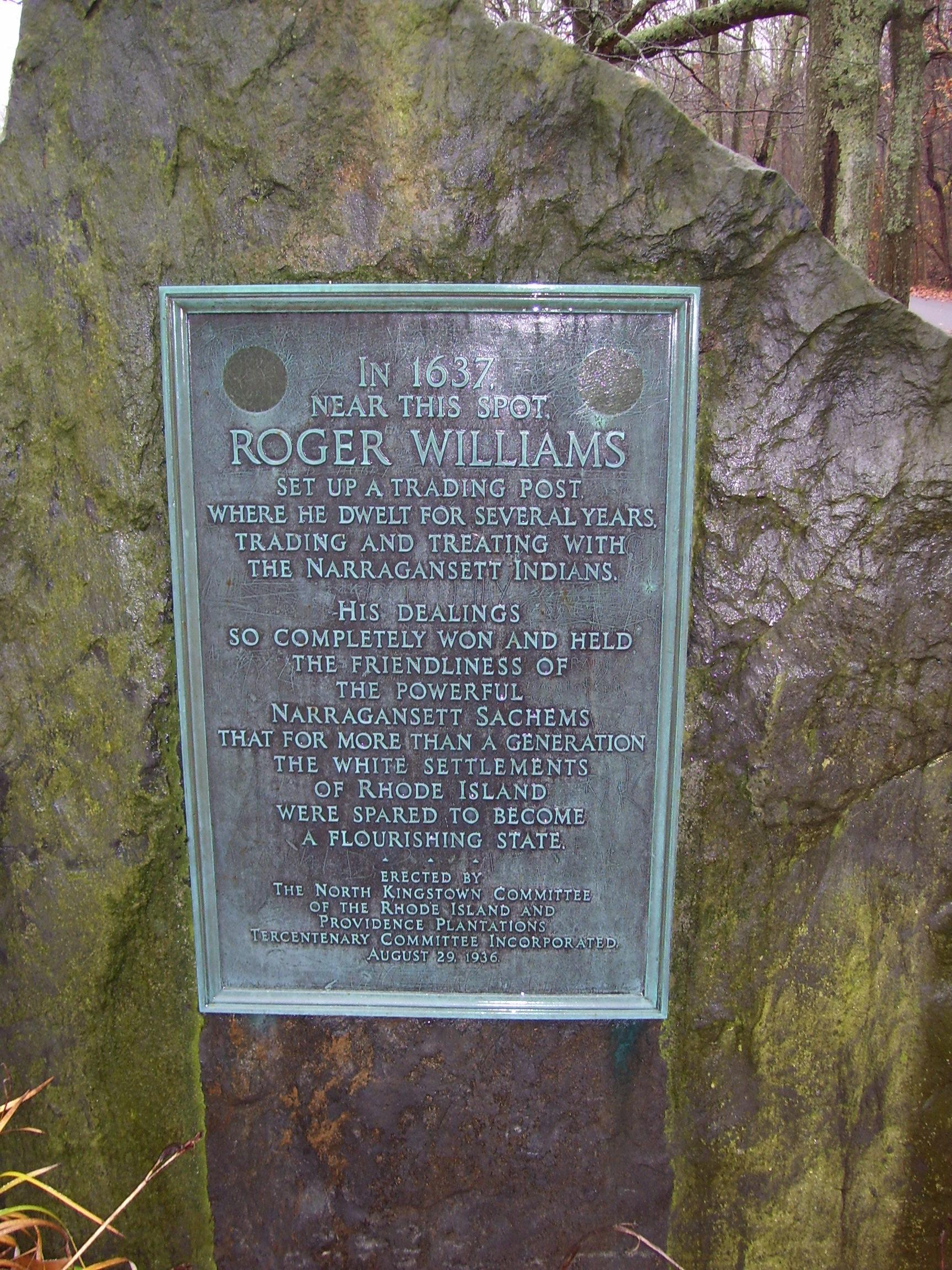
Roger Williams trading post site in front of the house on Post Road

== See also ==
- List of the oldest buildings in Rhode Island
- National Register of Historic Places listings in Washington County, Rhode Island
