= Joseph Pierce Farm =

Historic house in Rhode Island, United States

- U.S. National Register of Historic Places
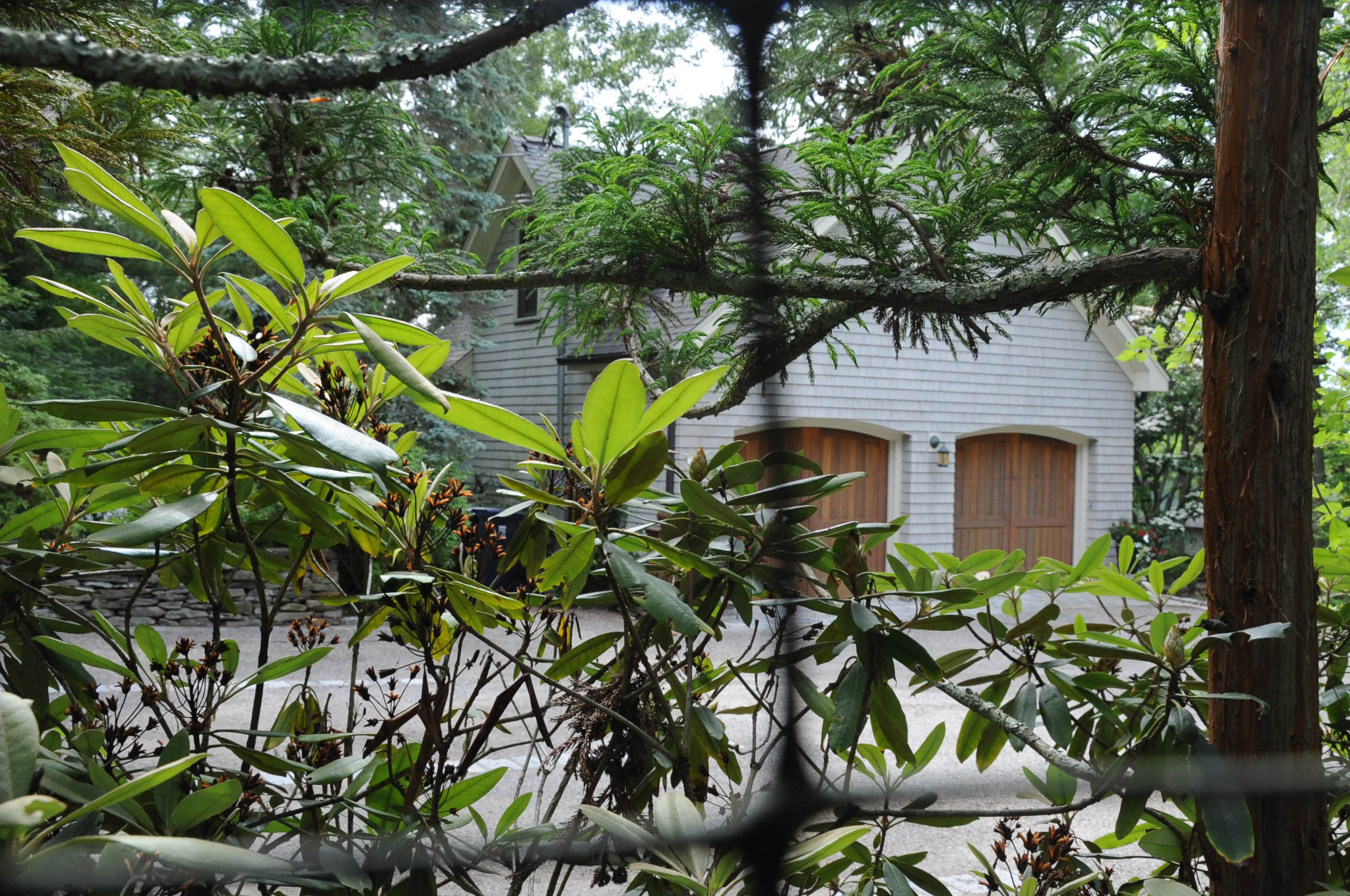

- Location within Rhode Island Location within the United States
- Location: North Kingstown, Rhode Island
- Coordinates: 41°31′22″N 71°26′42″W
- Area: 18 acres (7.3 ha)
- MPS: North Kingstown MRA
- NRHP reference No.: 85001652
- Added to NRHP: July 19, 1985=

The Joseph Pierce Farm is an historic farm at 933 Gilbert Stuart Road in North Kingstown, Rhode Island. It consists of 18 acres (7.3 ha) of land, along with an 18th-century farmhouse and a number of 19th-century outbuildings. The oldest portion of the house, its southern ell, was originally built with a gable roof, but this was extended to the north in the late 18th or early 19th century, and given it present gambrel roof and Federal styling. Later additions in the 19th and 20th centuries gave the house its present cruciform appearance. Outbuildings dating to the 19th century include a barn with attached privy, a toolshed, and a henhouse. The complex is a well-preserved reminder of the area's rural heritage.

The farm was listed on the National Register of Historic Places in 1985.

== See also ==
- National Register of Historic Places listings in Washington County, Rhode Island
