= Joseph Slocum House =

Historic house in Rhode Island, United States

- U.S. National Register of Historic Places
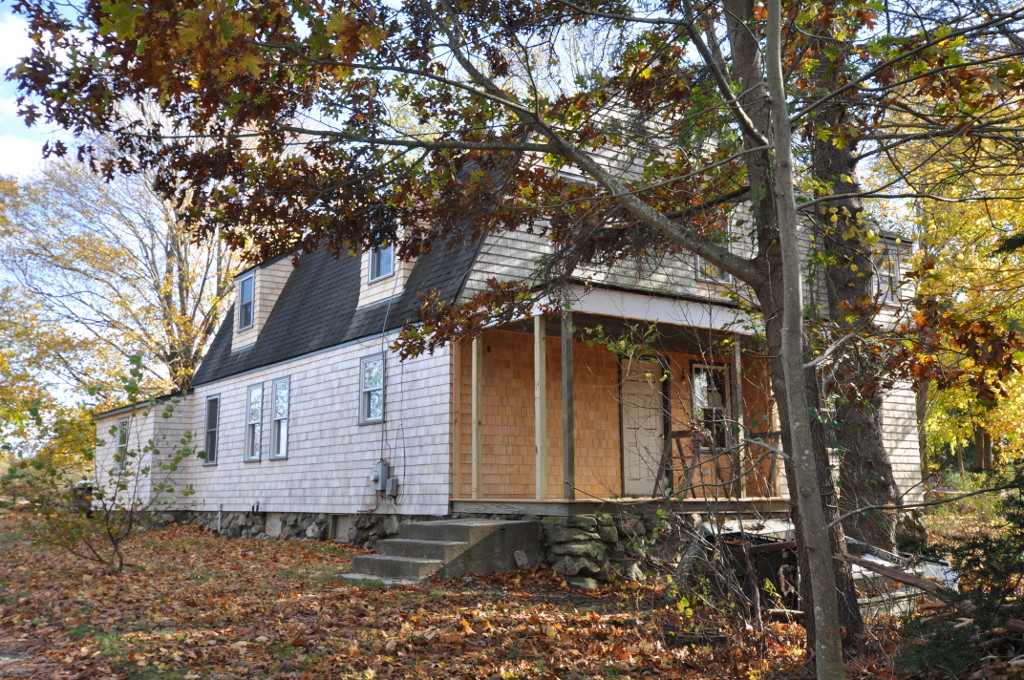
- This house now stands on the site; if it is the original it is much altered

- Location within Rhode Island Location within the United States
- Location: Slocum Rd., North Kingstown, Rhode Island
- Coordinates: 41°31′35″N 71°31′4″W
- Built: 1750
- Architect: Cape
- MPS: North Kingstown MRA
- NRHP reference No.: 85001648
- Added to NRHP: July 19, 1985

The Joseph Slocum House is an historic house on Slocum Road (about 1/4 mile south of Indian Corner Road) in North Kingstown, Rhode Island. It is a 1 1/2-story wood-frame house, five bays wide, with a large central chimney. It faces south on the east side of Slocum Road. The house has been dated to the mid-18th century based on architectural evidence; its first documented owner was Joseph Slocum, in the early 19th century. The house is a rare surviving 18th-century farmhouse, a type once numerous in the town.

The house was listed on the National Register of Historic Places in 1985.

== See also ==
- National Register of Historic Places listings in Washington County, Rhode Island
