= Lafayette Village =

- U.S. National Register of Historic Places
- U.S. Historic district
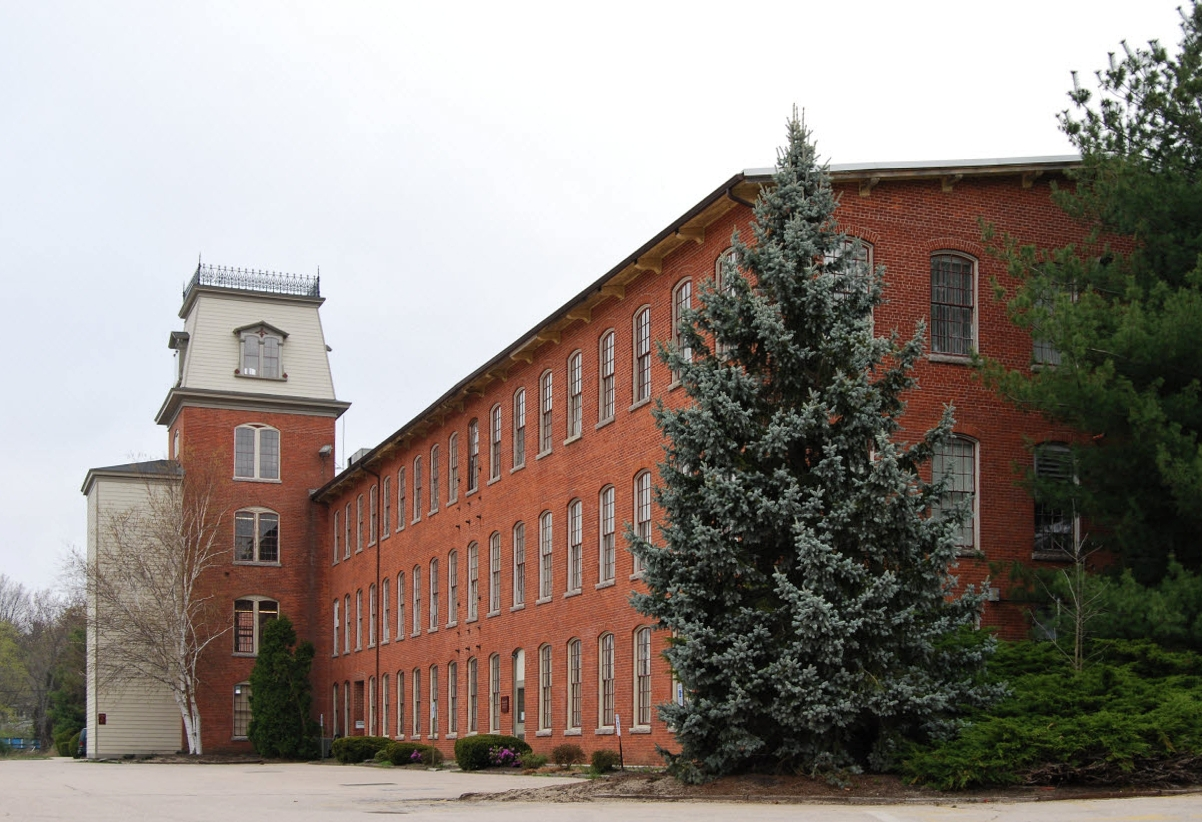
- Rodman Mill

- Location within Rhode Island Location within the United States
- Location: North Kingstown, Rhode Island
- Coordinates: 41°34′24″N 71°28′59″W
- Area: 164 acres (66 ha)
- NRHP reference No.: 78000019
- Added to NRHP: November 14, 1978

Lafayette Village is a historic district extending along Ten Rod Road in North Kingstown, Rhode Island. It encompasses a linear rural and industrial village, running from the Wickford Junction railroad crossing in the west to Angel Avenue in the east, and includes a number of residential properties on adjacent side streets. The centerpiece of the district is the Rodman Manufacturing Company complex, which operated here for a century beginning in the 1840s. The Robert Rodman Mansion, a Second Empire house with an elaborate porch, stands at 731 Ten Rod Road, and the Walter Rodman House, built in the 1870s, is even more elaborately decorated. Most of the residential stock in the district is mill-related housing built by the Rodmans for their workers.

The district was added to the National Register of Historic Places in 1978.

== See also ==
- National Register of Historic Places listings in Washington County, Rhode Island
