= James R. Arnold =

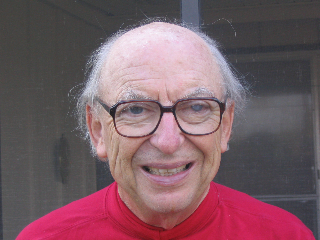
- Born: May 5, 1923; Metuchen, New Jersey
- Died: January 6, 2012 (aged 88); La Jolla, California, United States
- Other name: Jim Arnold
- Education: Ph.D., Princeton University, 1946
- Known for: Cosmochemistry; Geology of the Moon
- Spouse: Louise C. Arnold
- Awards: Ernest Orlando Lawrence Award, Chemistry and Metallurgy (1968); NASA Exceptional Scientific Achievement Medal (1970); Leonard Medal, Meteoritical Society, 1976
- Scientific career
- Fields: Cosmochemistry
- Workplaces: Princeton University; University of Chicago; University of California, San Diego

James Richard Arnold (May 5, 1923 – January 6, 2012) was the Harold C. Urey Professor of Chemistry (emeritus), and a noted pioneer in the field of planetary and space chemistry at the University of California, San Diego (UCSD), where an endowed lectureship has been established in his name.

== Early life and education ==
Arnold received his education at Princeton University, where he enrolled as an undergraduate at age 16. He earned his doctorate there in 1946 at 23, for work on the Manhattan Project (his thesis is still classified). Concerns about nuclear fallout and war prompted him to be an early member of the Union of Concerned Scientists and a World Federalist, through which he met his wife Louise in 1950.

As a postdoctoral researcher under Willard Libby at the University of Chicago, Arnold helped develop the techniques for Carbon-14 dating, working with archeological samples from Egypt and other samples with known ages. For this work, Libby was awarded the Nobel Prize in Chemistry in 1960.

== Career ==
After his postdoc, Arnold returned to Princeton as a faculty member, working on using cosmic rays to measure the age of rocks., and where he began his work on extraterrestrial material, including cosmic rays. It was at Princeton that Masatake (Masa) Honda and Devendra Lal first joined his work, an association amongst them that would last the rest of their lives.

In 1957, Roger Revelle was working to start UCSD near the campus of Scripps Institution of Oceanography. He recruited Arnold and a few others to be the founding faculty. The recruitment of Harold C. Urey convinced Arnold to accept and move west in 1958, leaving Princeton to become the founding chair of the UCSD Department of Chemistry and help found the campus and recruit faculty. He was a NASA consultant for many years, helping set scientific research priorities, starting just three months after NASA was founded. He played a major role in establishing and reforming the Lunar Receiving Laboratory for handling lunar samples returned during the Apollo program, including being one of the "Four Horsemen", along with Bob Walker, Paul Werner Gast, and Gerry Wasserburg.

Arnold performed his own research on lunar rocks and cosmic rays. Under the name SHRELLDALFF (from the initials of its members), his team produced important early papers, and he continued long afterwards with lunar studies, including measurements of the bombardment of the lunar surface by cosmic rays, helping to plot the energy output of the Sun over millions of years. For his work he was awarded the NASA Exceptional Scientific Achievement Medal in 1970.

At the request of then-Governor Jerry Brown, he founded the University of California's California Space Institute (CalSpace) in 1979, and was its first director for ten years,

Asteroid 2143, "Jimarnold", was named for Arnold by its discoverers, E. F. Helin and Gene Shoemaker, in 1980 for his work on computer models of meteorite travel.

Arnold was a member of the U.S. National Academy of Sciences, the American Academy of Arts and Sciences, and a Foreign Fellow of the Indian National Science Academy.

Arnold was also known for wild shirts, a relief from the formal dress required at Princeton. He was married to Louise Arnold for 60 years, and they had three sons, Bob, Ted, and Ken.
