= North Kingstown, Rhode Island =

- Town
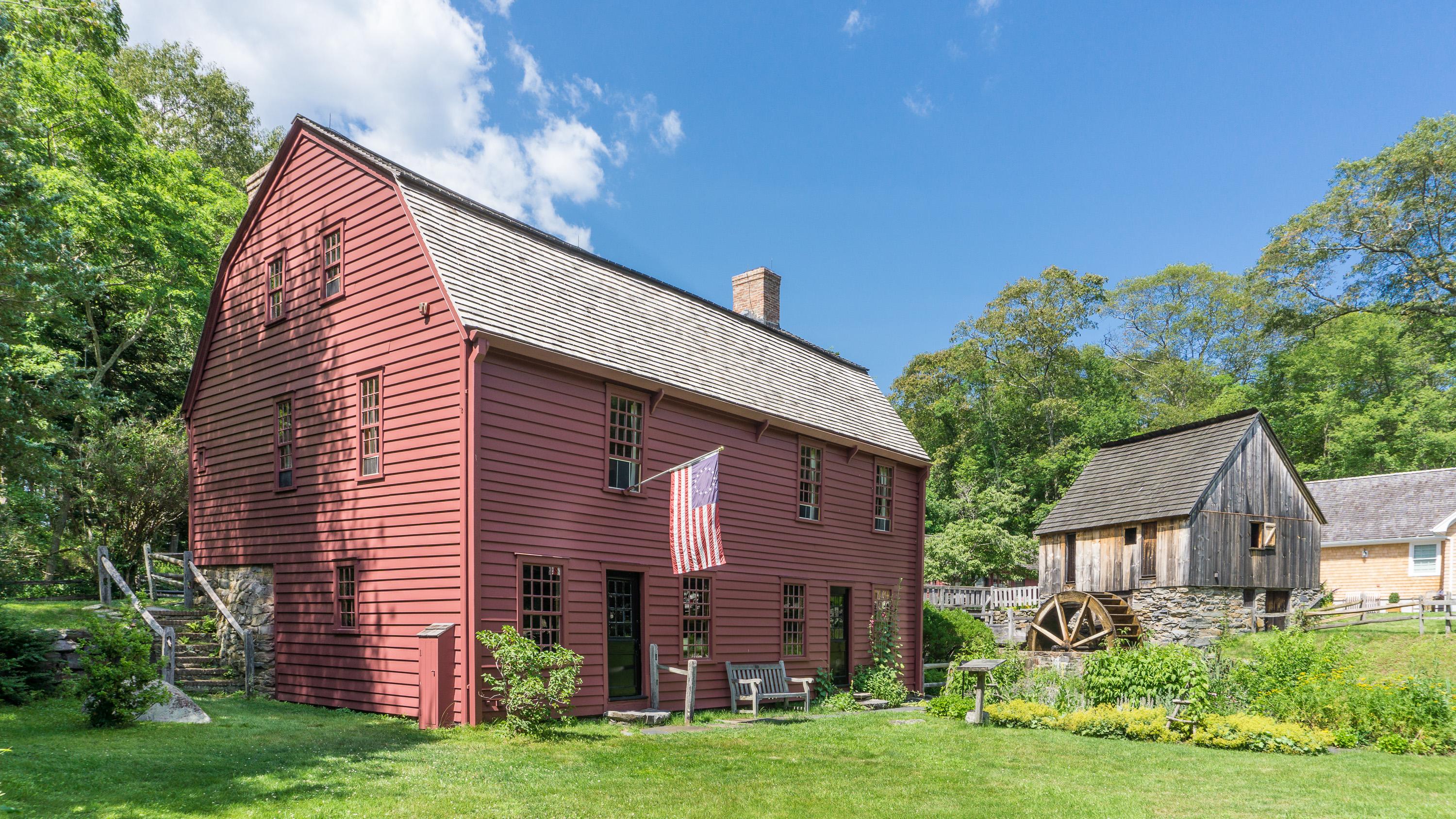
- The Gilbert Stuart Birthplace in North Kingstown

- Seal Logo
- Nickname: "NK"
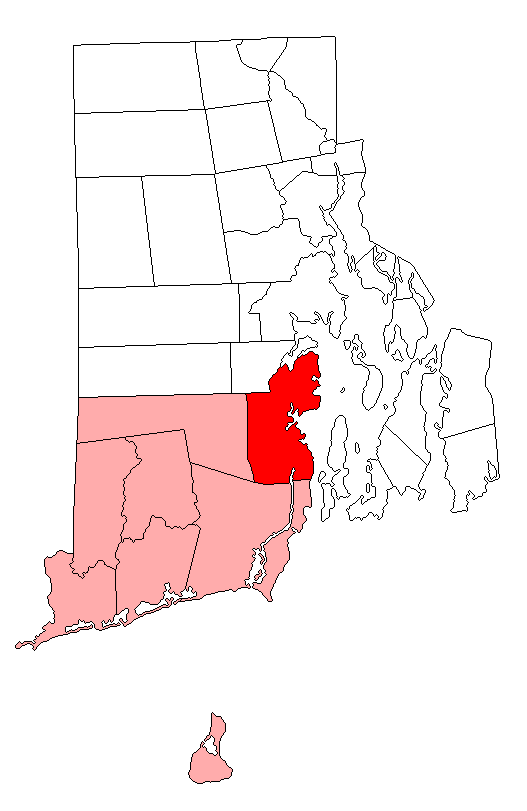
- Location of North Kingstown in Washington County, Rhode Island
- Coordinates: 41°34′50″N 71°27′14″W
- Country: United States
- State: Rhode Island
- County: Washington

Government
  - Town Council: Gregory A. Mancini; Dr. Kimberly Ann Page; Katherine Anderson; Matthew B. McCoy; Lawrence C. Mandel

Area
  - Total: 58.3 sq mi (151.1 km^{2})
  - Land: 43.6 sq mi (112.9 km^{2})
  - Water: 14.7 sq mi (38.2 km^{2})
- Elevation: 82 ft (25 m)

Population (2020)
  - Total: 27,732
  - Density: 636/sq mi (245.6/km^{2})
- Time zone: UTC−5 (Eastern (EST))
  - Summer (DST): UTC−4 (EDT)
- ZIP codes: 02852 (North Kingstown), 02874 (Saunderstown), 02877 (Slocum)
- Area code: 401
- FIPS code: 44-51580
- GNIS feature ID: 1220088
- Website: https://www.northkingstownri.gov/

North Kingstown is a town in Washington County, Rhode Island, United States, and is part of the Providence metropolitan area. Its population was 27,732 in the 2020 census. North Kingstown is the birthplace of American portraitist Gilbert Stuart, who was born in the village of Saunderstown. Within the town is Quonset Point, location of the former Naval Air Station Quonset Point, known for the invention of the Quonset hut, as well as the historic village of Wickford.

== History ==
The area was first settled by Roger Williams and Richard Smith, who set up trading posts near Wickford where Smith's Castle is today. The town of Kings Towne was founded in 1674, by the colonial government, and included the present-day towns of North Kingstown, South Kingstown, Exeter, and Narragansett. In 1723, Kings Towne was split into two parts, North Kingstown and South Kingstown, with North Kingstown, having the earliest settlements, retaining the 1674 establishment date. In 1742, the town of Exeter was taken from the western part of North Kingstown.

On September 17, 2024, the National Park Service announced that North Kingstown was named a World War II Heritage City.

== Geography ==
According to the United States Census Bureau, the town has a total area of 58.3 square miles (151 km^{2}), of which 14.8 square miles (38 km^{2}) (25.28%) are covered by water. It is bordered on the east by Narragansett Bay.

== Demographics ==
Historical population
Census	Pop.	Note	%±
1790	2,907		—
1800	2,794		−3.9%
1810	2,957		5.8%
1820	3,007		1.7%
1830	3,036		1.0%
1840	2,909		−4.2%
1850	2,971		2.1%
1860	3,104		4.5%
1870	3,563		14.8%
1880	3,949		10.8%
1890	4,193		6.2%
1900	4,194		0.0%
1910	4,048		−3.5%
1920	3,397		−16.1%
1930	4,279		26.0%
1940	4,604		7.6%
1950	14,180		208.0%
1960	18,977		33.8%
1970	29,793		57.0%
1980	21,938		−26.4%
1990	23,786		8.4%
2000	26,326		10.7%
2010	26,486		0.6%
2020	27,732		4.7%
U.S. Decennial Census

As of the 2020 census, 27,732 people and 11,338 households were in the town. The population density was 642.4 inhabitants per square mile (248.0/km^{2}), with 12,189 housing units in the town. The racial makeup of the town was 89.59% White, 1.27% African American, 0.57% American Indian/Alaska Native, 1.90% Asian, 1.19% from some other race, and 5.42% from two or more races. Hispanics or Latinos of any race were 3.65% of the population.

Of the 11,338 households, 28.1% had children under 18 living with them, 54.7% were married couples living together, 23.6% had a female householder with no spouse present, and 14.2% had a male householder with no spouse present. About 11.2% of all households were made up of individuals, and 4.6% had someone living alone who was 65 or older. The average household size was 2.42 and the average family size was 2.98.

In the town, the age distribution was 18.4% under 18, 9.5% from 18 to 24, 22.6% from 25 to 44, 28.1% from 45 to 64, and 21.4% who were 65 or older. The median age was 44 years. The median income for a household in the town was $120,565, and for a family was $144,898. The per capita income for the town was $61,280. About 6.6% of the population were below the poverty line, including 9.1% of those under 18 and 6.6% of those 65 or over.

== Transportation ==
Wickford Junction is a terminus station on the Providence/Stoughton Line of the MBTA Commuter Rail, providing weekday train service to Providence Station and Boston's South Station. At 63 miles from Boston, it is the most distant station in the MBTA's 135-station commuter-rail network, and the only one in its most expensive fare zone.

RIPTA also serves in the town inbound to Providence and outbound to Narragansett or Newport.

North Kingstown is also served by a passenger ferry connecting to the island of Martha's Vineyard.

== Education ==
North Kingstown School Department is the municipal school district. It operates North Kingstown High School.

== Notable people ==
- Elizabeth Beisel, two-time Olympic medalist swimmer
- John Cole (1715–1777), was a lawyer and 12th chief justice of the Rhode Island Supreme Court
- Captain Daniel Fones
- Dee Dee Myers (born 1961), 19th White House press secretary
- Robert J. Papp Jr. - naval commander and recipient of the Order of Naval Merit Admiral Padilla
- Gilbert Stuart (1755–1828), painter, his portrait of George Washington appears on the one-dollar bill

== Points of interest ==
- Casey Farm (1725): An original colonial plantation, it is today one of the oldest operational farms in New England.
- Davis Memorial Wildlife Refuge: These 96 acres of forest and wetlands are preserved by the Audubon Society of Rhode Island.
- Devil's Foot Rock: A footprint-like natural impression or possibly petrosomatoglyph was found here. Legends going back to the colonial era tell of a Native American woman being chased by the devil. Some say that she fled from Boston. Her pursuer is said to have left his footprints at Devil's Foot Rock, then at Chimney Hill in South Kingstown, and finally at Block Island.
- Gilbert Stuart Birthplace and Museum (1751): The house in which American portraitist Gilbert Stuart was born in 1755 is now a museum, which features works from throughout Stuart's career, and operational grist and snuff mills.
- Historic Wickford Village: A historic seaside village, it contains one of the largest collections of preserved 18th-century houses in the Northeastern United States. Wickford also has a large and scenic harbor.
- David S. Baker Estate: This is the home of Rhode Island's first elected governor to never be seated.
- Quonset Air Museum: A large museum, it is located at the former Naval Air Station Quonset Point, which focuses on military aviation history.
- Smith's Castle (1678): This colonial plantation is located on the shore of Narragansett Bay.
- Quonset Point, a former military base, once was the home of the Naval Construction Battalions known as the Seabees.

== Other National Historic Places in North Kingstown ==
- Allen-Madison House (1801)
- Camp Endicott (1942)
- Crowfield Historic District
- Davisville Historic District
- George Douglas House (1738)
- George Fayerweather Blacksmith Shop (1819)
- Ezekial Gardner House
- Hamilton Mill Village Historic District
- Lafayette Village
- Stephen Northup House (1712)
- Old Narragansett Cemetery
- Old Narragansett Church (1707)
- Palmer-Northrup House (1680)
- Joseph Pierce Farm
- Plum Beach Light (1899)
- Poplar Point Light (1831)
- Rathbun House
- Esbon Sanford House (1832)
- Saunderstown Historic District
- Six Principle Baptist Church (1703)
- Joseph Slocum House (1750)
- Spink Farm (1798)
- St. Paul's Church (1847)
- YWCA Site
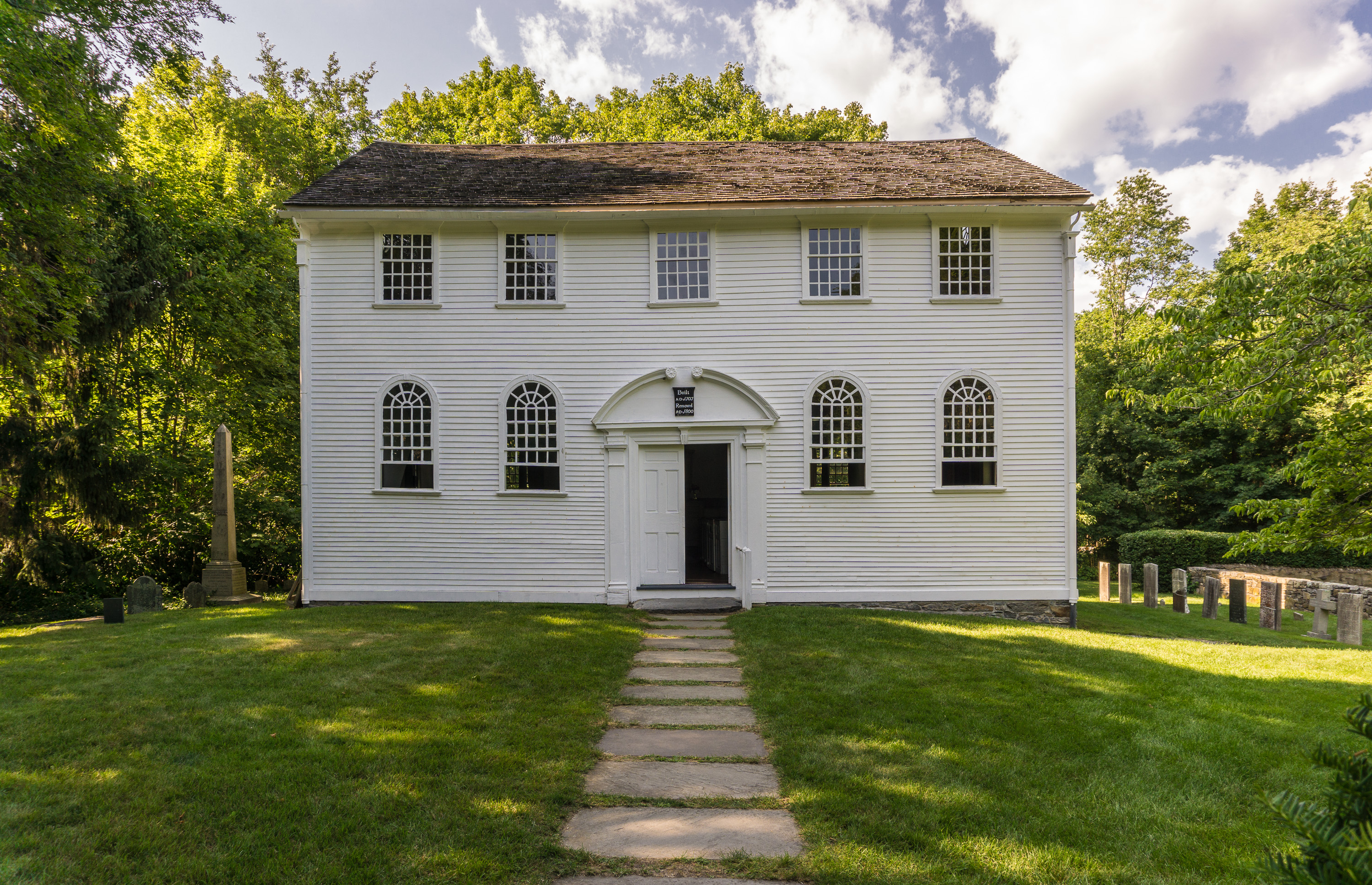
Old Narragansett Church, built in 1707, is the oldest Episcopal Church building in New England

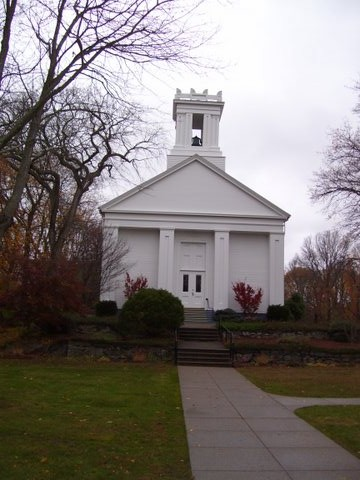
Baptist Church in Wickford
