= National Register of Historic Places listings in South Kingstown, Rhode Island =

This is a list of Registered Historic Places in South Kingstown, Rhode Island.

Contents: Counties in Rhode Island

Bristol | Kent | Newport | Providence (Pawtucket | Providence (city) | Woonsocket) | Washington

This National Park Service list is complete through NPS recent listings posted April 24, 2026.

	Name on the Register	Image	Date listed	Location	City or town	Description
1	Bouchard Archeological Site, RI-1025		November 1, 1984 (#84000370)	Address Restricted	South Kingstown	Listed in Usquepaug.
2	Browning's Beach Historic District	Browning's Beach Historic District	September 5, 1997 (#97000952)	Browning's Beach, 0.5 mi (0.80 km) west of the junction of Card Pond and Matunuck Beach Rds. 41°22′26″N 71°33′52″W	South Kingstown	
3	Jireh Bull Blockhouse	Jireh Bull Blockhouse	November 3, 1983 (#83003869)	Address Restricted	South Kingstown	
4	Cottrell House	Cottrell House	November 21, 1996 (#96001319)	500 Waites Corner Rd. 41°29′22″N 71°33′55″W	South Kingstown	
5	Dewey Cottage	Dewey Cottage	May 7, 1992 (#92000467)	668 Matunuck Beach Rd. 41°22′42″N 71°32′56″W	South Kingstown	
6	Henry Eldred Farm	Henry Eldred Farm	November 18, 1991 (#91001646)	368 Old North Rd. 41°29′55″N 71°31′14″W	South Kingstown	
7	George Fayerweather Blacksmith Shop	George Fayerweather Blacksmith Shop	November 29, 1984 (#84000470)	Intersection RI 108 and 138; 41°28′49″N 71°31′13″W	South Kingstown	
8	Fernwood Archeological Site, RI-702		September 12, 1985 (#85002364)	Address Restricted	South Kingstown	
9	R. R. Gardner House	R. R. Gardner House	November 21, 1996 (#96001320)	700 Curtis Corner Rd. 41°27′10″N 71°31′54″W	South Kingstown	
10	Hale House	Hale House	June 5, 2007 (#07000527)	2625A Commodore Oliver Hazard Perry Highway; 41°23′52″N 71°33′03″W	South Kingstown	
11	Kenyon's Department Store	Kenyon's Department Store	November 5, 1992 (#92001540)	344 Main St. 41°26′17″N 71°29′59″W	South Kingstown	
12	Kingston Hill Farm	Kingston Hill Farm	May 7, 1993 (#93000343)	549 Old North Rd. 41°29′41″N 71°30′51″W	South Kingstown	
13	Kingston Railroad Station	Kingston Railroad Station	April 26, 1978 (#78000018)	Kingston Rd. 41°29′03″N 71°33′39″W	South Kingstown	Restored 1875 original station built by Providence and Stonington Railroad; still used today.
14	Kingston Village Historic District	Kingston Village Historic District	May 1, 1974 (#74000011)	South Kingstown; 41°28′48″N 71°31′29″W	South Kingstown	
15	Lambda Chi Site, RI-704		November 1, 1984 (#84000372)	Address Restricted	South Kingstown	
16	Henry Marchant Farm	Henry Marchant Farm	August 16, 1979 (#79000009)	S. County Trail; 41°28′52″N 71°35′56″W	South Kingstown	
17	William Davis Miller House	William Davis Miller House	March 21, 1985 (#85000627)	130 Main St. 41°26′08″N 71°30′27″W	South Kingstown	
18	Ministerial Rd. Site, RI-781	Ministerial Rd. Site, RI-781	November 15, 1984 (#84000565)	Address Restricted	South Kingstown	
19	Silas Mumford Site (Tappan Site RI-705)	Silas Mumford Site (Tappan Site RI-705)	November 1, 1984 (#84000382)	Address Restricted	South Kingstown	
20	Peace Dale Historic District	Peace Dale Historic District	October 30, 1987 (#87000493)	Roughly bounded by Kensey Rd., Oakwoods Dr., Kingstown Rd., School, Church and Railroad Sts. 41°27′04″N 71°29′42″W	South Kingstown	
21	Commodore Oliver Perry Farm	Commodore Oliver Perry Farm	August 26, 1982 (#82000020)	Commodore Perry Highway (US Route 1); 41°25′08″N 71°31′51″W	South Kingstown	
22	Perry-Carpenter Grist Mill	Perry-Carpenter Grist Mill	February 22, 1990 (#90000106)	364 Moonstone Beach Rd. 41°23′35″N 71°34′34″W	South Kingstown	
23	Potter Pond Archeological District	Potter Pond Archeological District	December 8, 1987 (#87002102)	Address Restricted	South Kingstown	
24	Red House	Red House	November 21, 1996 (#96001323)	2403 Post Rd. 41°24′02″N 71°34′15″W	South Kingstown	
25	Gen. Isaac Peace Rodman House	Gen. Isaac Peace Rodman House	April 23, 1990 (#90000596)	1789 Kingstown Rd. 41°27′48″N 71°30′33″W	South Kingstown	
26	Shadow Farm	Shadow Farm	February 7, 1986 (#86000785)	Kingstown Rd. 41°26′15″N 71°29′28″W	South Kingstown	
27	Theatre-By-the-Sea	Theatre-By-the-Sea	July 10, 1980 (#80004597)	Card Ponds Rd. 41°22′37″N 71°33′46″W	South Kingstown	
28	Tootell House	Tootell House	May 26, 2000 (#00000552)	1747 Mooresfield Rd. 41°28′51″N 71°31′02″W	South Kingstown	
29	Usquepaug Road Historic District	Usquepaug Road Historic District	October 30, 1987 (#87001298)	Usquepaug Rd. 41°30′14″N 71°36′01″W	South Kingstown	
30	Wakefield Historic District	Wakefield Historic District	May 30, 1996 (#96000572)	Roughly, Main St. from Belmont Ave. to Columbia St. 41°26′15″N 71°30′04″W	South Kingstown	
31	Washington County Court House	Washington County Court House	November 5, 1992 (#92001542)	3481 Kingstown Rd. 41°29′02″N 71°33′21″W	South Kingstown	former county courthouse, now an arts center
32	Willow Dell	Willow Dell	November 21, 1996 (#96001321)	2700 Commodore Oliver Hazard Perry Highway; 41°23′47″N 71°33′04″W	South Kingstown	

== See also ==
- National Register of Historic Places listings in Washington County, Rhode Island
- List of National Historic Landmarks in Rhode Island
