= National Register of Historic Places listings in Westerly, Rhode Island =

This is a list of Registered Historic Places in Westerly, Rhode Island.

Contents: Counties in Rhode Island

Bristol | Kent | Newport | Providence (Pawtucket | Providence (city) | Woonsocket) | Washington

This National Park Service list is complete through NPS recent listings posted April 24, 2026.

	Name on the Register	Image	Date listed	Location	City or town	Description
1	Babcock-Smith House	Babcock-Smith House	July 24, 1972 (#72000008)	124 Granite St. 41°22′16″N 71°49′13″W	Westerly	
2	Bradford Village Historic District	Bradford Village Historic District	May 30, 1996 (#96000573)	Roughly Bowling Ln. from the Pawcatuck River to Vars Ln. and Main St. from the Bradford Bridge to Church Ave. 41°24′08″N 71°45′06″W	Hopkinton and Westerly	
3	Flying Horse Carousel	Flying Horse Carousel	January 11, 1980 (#80000019)	Bay St. 41°18′32″N 71°51′31″W	Westerly	One of the earliest carousels still in use, dating to 1876. Horses suspended from chains rather than on poles, hence name.
4	Former Immaculate Conception Church	Former Immaculate Conception Church	April 24, 1973 (#73000007)	119 High St. 41°22′55″N 71°49′32″W	Westerly	
5	Lewis-Card-Perry House	Lewis-Card-Perry House	October 4, 2005 (#05001152)	12 Margin St. 41°22′08″N 71°49′57″W	Westerly	
6	Main Street Historic District	Main Street Historic District	January 9, 1978 (#78000021)	113-132 Main St., 8, 7-13 School St., 3-14 Maple St. 41°22′25″N 71°49′51″W	Westerly	
7	North End Historic District	North End Historic District	April 20, 2006 (#06000298)	Canal, Dayton, Friendship, High, Pearl, Pierce, Pleasant, Pond, West, Industrial Lila, Geranium, Marriott and Turano; 41°23′16″N 71°49′38″W	Westerly	
8	Nursery Site, RI-273		November 1, 1984 (#84000386)	Address Restricted	Westerly	
9	US Post Office	US Post Office	August 12, 1971 (#71000004)	High and Broad Sts. 41°22′39″N 71°49′50″W	Westerly	
10	Watch Hill Historic District	Watch Hill Historic District	September 5, 1985 (#85001948)	Roughly bounded by Breen, Watch Hill, and E. Hill Rds., Block Island Sound, Little Narragansett Bay, and the Pawtucket River; 41°18′49″N 71°51′23″W	Westerly	Well-preserved Victorian seaside resort area
11	Weekapaug Inn	Weekapaug Inn	January 25, 2007 (#06001305)	25 Spray Rock Rd. 41°19′49″N 71°45′03″W	Westerly	
12	Westerly Armory	Westerly Armory	November 7, 1996 (#96001322)	Railroad Ave., west of downtown Westerly; 41°22′55″N 71°49′40″W	Westerly	
13	Westerly Downtown Historic District	Westerly Downtown Historic District	July 19, 1984 (#84002055)	Railroad Ave., High, Canal, Broad, Union, and Main Sts. 41°22′45″N 71°49′49″W	Westerly	
14	Wilcox Park Historic District	Wilcox Park Historic District	May 7, 1973 (#73000011)	Roughly bounded by Broad, Granite, High Sts. and Grove Ave. and running along Elm St. 41°22′36″N 71°49′43″W	Westerly	

== See also ==
- National Register of Historic Places listings in Washington County, Rhode Island
- List of National Historic Landmarks in Rhode Island
