= Perry Homestead Historic District =

Historic district in Rhode Island, United States

- U.S. National Register of Historic Places
- U.S. Historic district
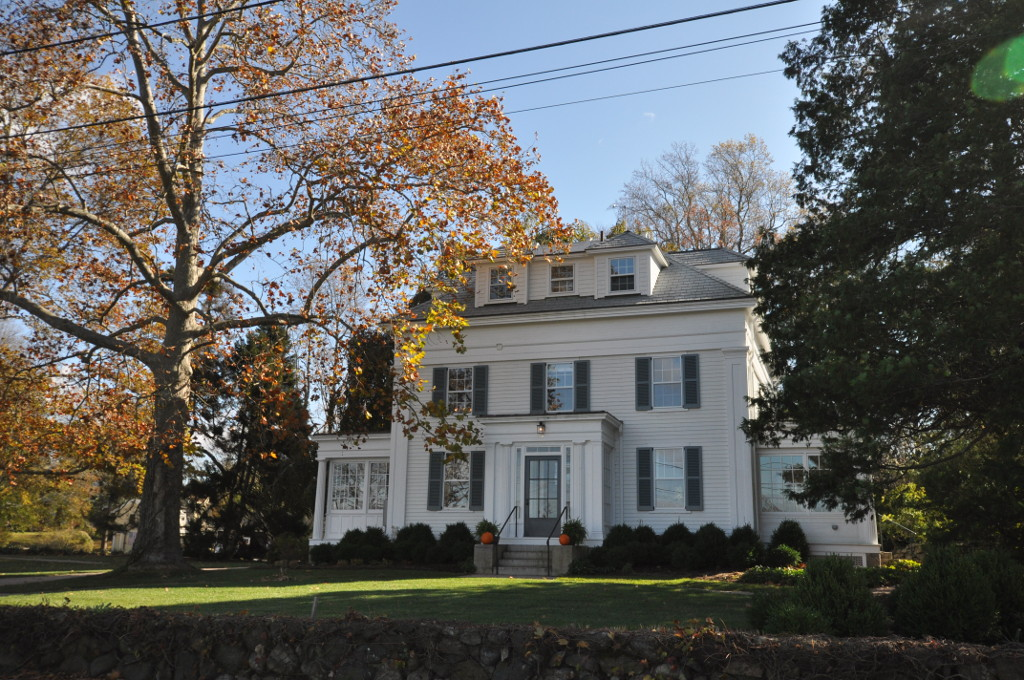

- Location within Rhode Island Location within the United States
- Location: 2, 4, 8, 12, 16 Margin & 15, 17 Beach Sts., Westerly, Rhode Island
- Coordinates: 41°22′9″N 71°49′54″W
- Area: 8.5 acres (3.4 ha)
- Architect: Multiple
- Architectural style: Colonial Revival
- NRHP reference No.: 16000089
- Added to NRHP: March 15, 2016

The Perry Homestead Historic District encompasses a cluster of residences built as a family compound by the locally prominent Perry family in Westerly, Rhode Island. Extending mainly along the northern part of Margin Street south of downtown Westerly, the area was developed in the 1920s, and includes five family residences, a caretaker's house, and shared landscaping of a former gentleman's farm. The district was added to the National Register of Historic Places in 2016.

== Description and history ==
The Perry compound occupies more than 8 acres (3.2 ha) south of the junction of Margin and Beach Streets, in a mainly residential area south of downtown Westerly. Four of the compound's six houses face Margin Street, and provide views of the Pawcatuck River, whose bank Margin Street runs along. Two of these house stand close to the corner with Beach Street, and are separated from the other two by an open area that has been landscaped. A shared drive encircles this open area, providing access to the houses and outbuildings of the compound. Although some of the houses were built in the 19th century, most bear some elements of the Colonial Revival due to the activities of the Perrys in the 1910s and 1920s. The Lewis-Card-Perry House, separately listed on the National Register, retains an 18th-century appearance, having undergone restoration in the 1920s under the guidance of Norman Isham.

In the early 19th century, Thomas Perry (a relative of Admiral Oliver Hazard Perry) purchased 100 acres (40 ha) of land south of the village center of Westerly. Perry and his descendants played a major role in the development of Westerly as a business and shipping center in the 19th century, and into the 20th century, and also occupied prominent roles in the civic activities of the community. In the second half of the 19th century, three of Perry's sons operated a gentleman's farm on this property, and either built houses or moved them onto the fringes of the property. Charles Perry, Jr., a grandson of Thomas Perry, oversaw transformation of the farm into a landscaped family compound between about 1890 and 1930. The older houses were for the most part updated with Colonial Revival styling, the Lewis-Card-Perry House was restored, and the grounds were landscaped by Warren H. Manning.

== See also ==
- National Register of Historic Places listings in Washington County, Rhode Island
