= Old Harbor Historic District =

Historic district in Rhode Island, United States

- U.S. National Register of Historic Places
- U.S. Historic district
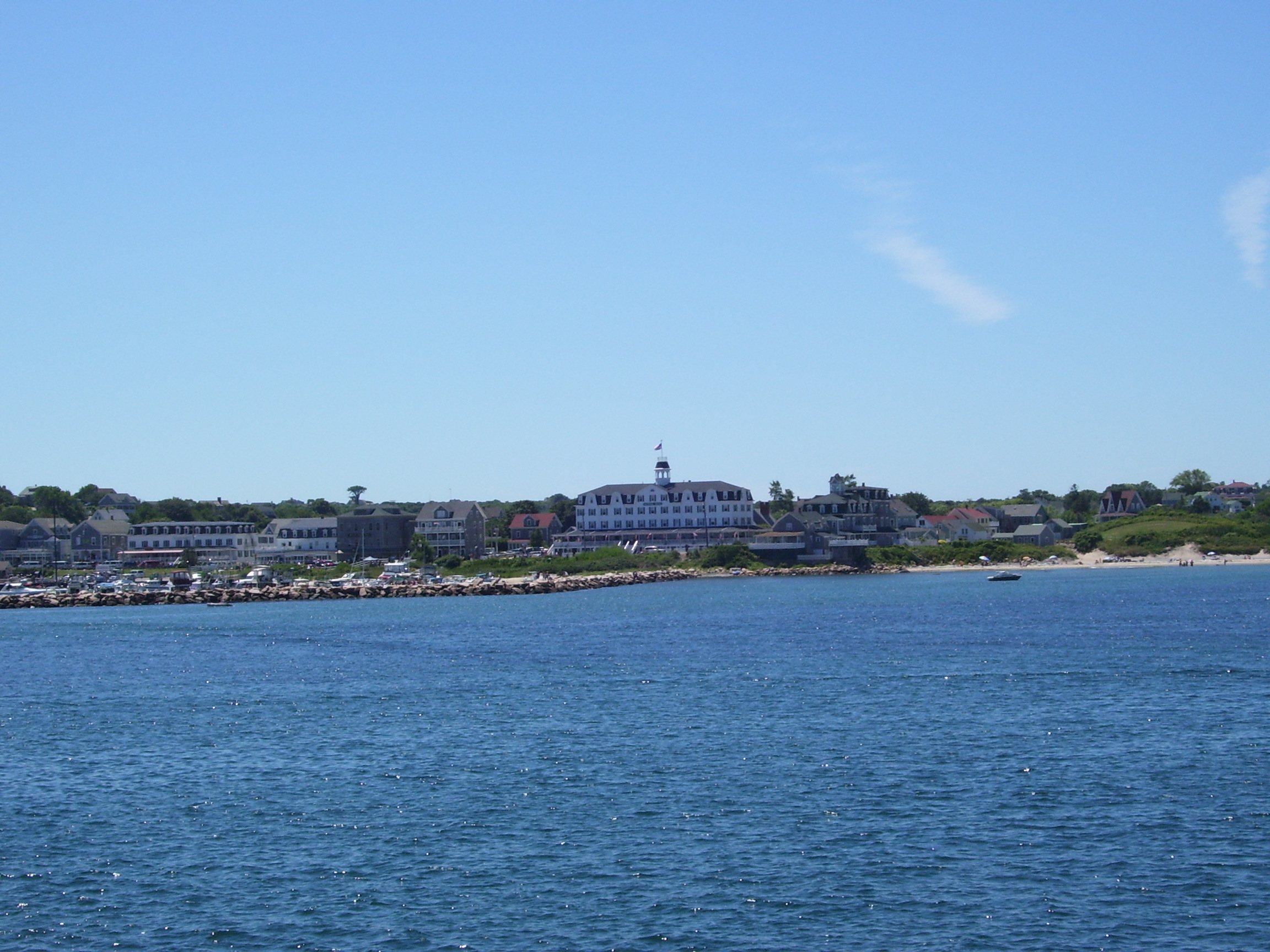
- Old Harbor in 2008 from the ferry

- Location within Rhode Island Location within the United States
- Location: New Shoreham, Rhode Island
- Coordinates: 41°10′20″N 71°33′27″W
- Area: 175 acres (71 ha)
- Architectural style: Second Empire
- NRHP reference No.: 74000012
- Added to NRHP: May 8, 1974

The Old Harbor Historic District is an historic district in the resort community of New Shoreham on Block Island off the southern coast of Rhode Island. Bounded by the Atlantic Ocean and Main Street, it includes Spring, High, and Water streets as well. There are 42 buildings listed in the district, which was listed on the National Register of Historic Places in 1974.

== District buildings ==
Chapel Street

- Site of First Baptist Church
- Saint Andrews Roman Catholic Church, c.1900

Dodge Street

- Surf Hotel, c. 1876
- Blue Dory Inn, c. 1870
- Drug Store, c. 1870
- Olsen's Cottage, c. 1875
- Rose Store, c. 1875
- Gothic Cottage, c. 1880
- Andrew. Dodge House, c. 1800
- Leslie Dodge House (The Gables Inn), c. 1860
- J. Hooper House, c. 1750
- Mansard House, c. 1875

High Street

- House, c. 1870
- Union Hotel, 1883
- Hartford Hotel, c. 1880
- Mitchell Cottage, c. 1865
- Masonic Lodge, c. 1876
- Perry Cottage, c. 1890
- Bellevue Hotel, c. 1885
- Eureka Hotel, c. 1880
- Highland House, c. 1890

Main Street

- Woonsocket House (Block Island Historical Society), c. 1875
- Woonsocket House (Annex Block Island Inn), c. 1880
- The Yellow Kittens, c. 1890

Spring Street

- Adrian Hotel (First Baptist Church), 1886
- Hotel Manisses, 1882
- 1661 Inn, c. 1870
- Rose Cottage, c. 1880
- Atlantic Hotel Norwich Hotel, c. 1880
- House, c. 1885

Water Street

- New National Hotel, 1888/1904
- Narragansett Hotel, c. 1875/c. 1908
- Ocean Cottage New Shoreham Hotel, c. 1875/c. 1910
- Pequot House, 1882
- Odd Fellows Hall, 1872
- Norton's Cottage Dept. Store, c. 1890
- Roller Skating Rink Empire Theatre, c. 1880
- City Drug Store, c. 1880
- C. C. Ball General Store, c. 1880
- Shamrock Inn Ocean View Annex, c. 1875
- Site of Ocean View Hotel

== See also ==
- National Register of Historic Places listings in Washington County, Rhode Island
