= Hygeia House (Rhode Island) =

Historic house in Rhode Island, United States

- U.S. National Register of Historic Places
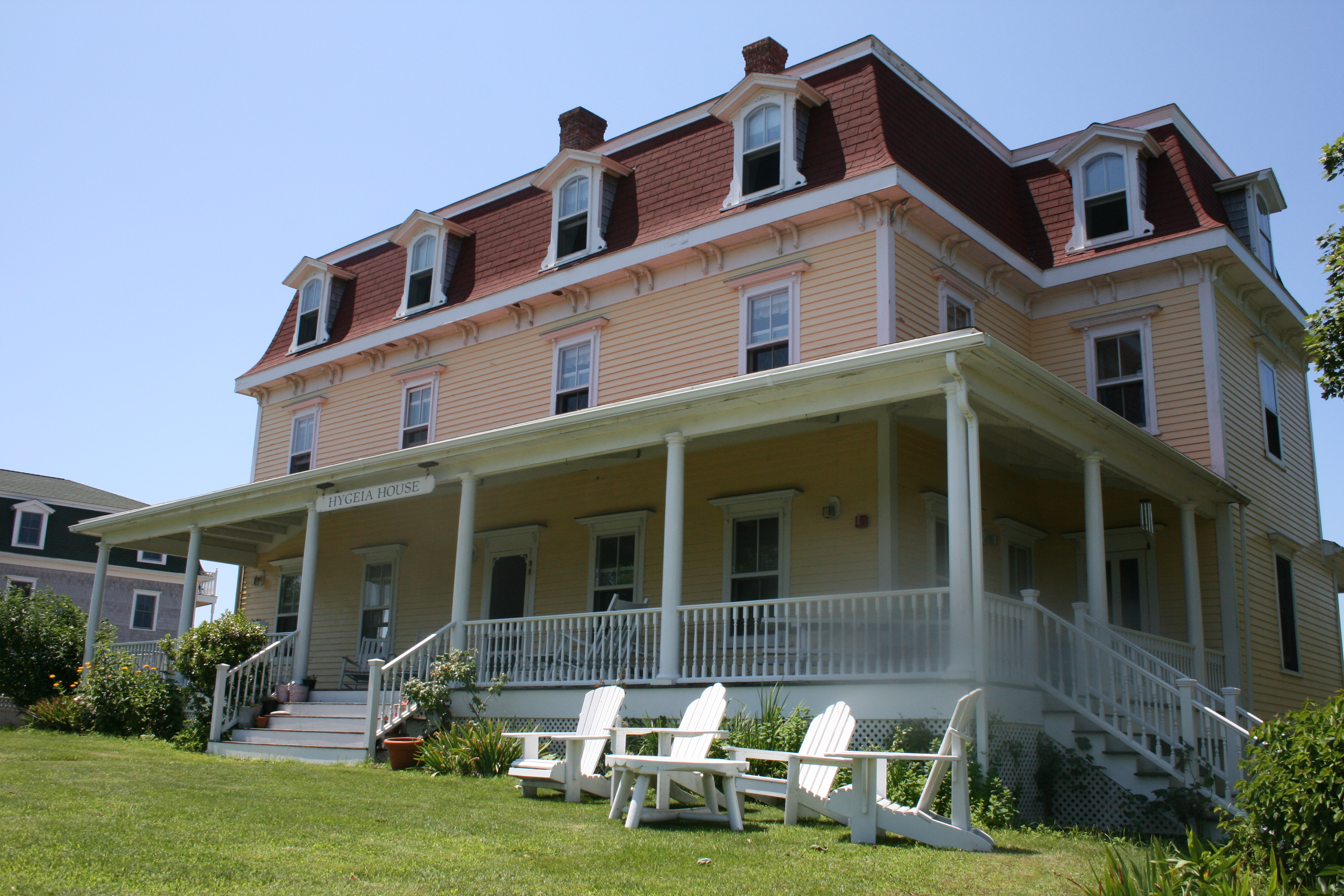

- Location within Rhode Island Location within the United States
- Location: New Shoreham, Rhode Island
- Coordinates: 41°10′40″N 71°34′18″W
- Area: 0.76 acres (0.31 ha)
- Built: 1885
- Architect: Wallis, Francis E.
- Architectural style: Second Empire
- MPS: New Shoreham (Block Island), Rhode Island MPS
- NRHP reference No.: 01001156
- Added to NRHP: October 22, 2001

Hygeia House is a historic vacation home on Beach Avenue on Block Island (New Shoreham, Rhode Island).

It is a 2-3 story wood-frame structure, four bays wide, with a mansard roof. The building presents 2 1/2 stories to the front, with a row of four dormers on the roof, a porch extending the entire width of the front, and wrapping around to the right to join a projecting section of the main block.

The hotel was built in 1885 and operated as the Seaside House at a location about 150 yards (140 m) south of its present location. It was moved here in 1907 to the grounds of the Hygeia Hotel, a much larger hotel that burned down in 1916.

The Hygeia's previous owner, Dr. John Champlin, had his medical office in this building and continued to rent rooms to summer visitors. It was used as employee housing for other tourist facilities for many years.

The building was listed on the National Register of Historic Places in 2001.

== See also ==
- National Register of Historic Places listings in Washington County, Rhode Island
