= US Weather Bureau Station (Block Island) =

- U.S. National Register of Historic Places
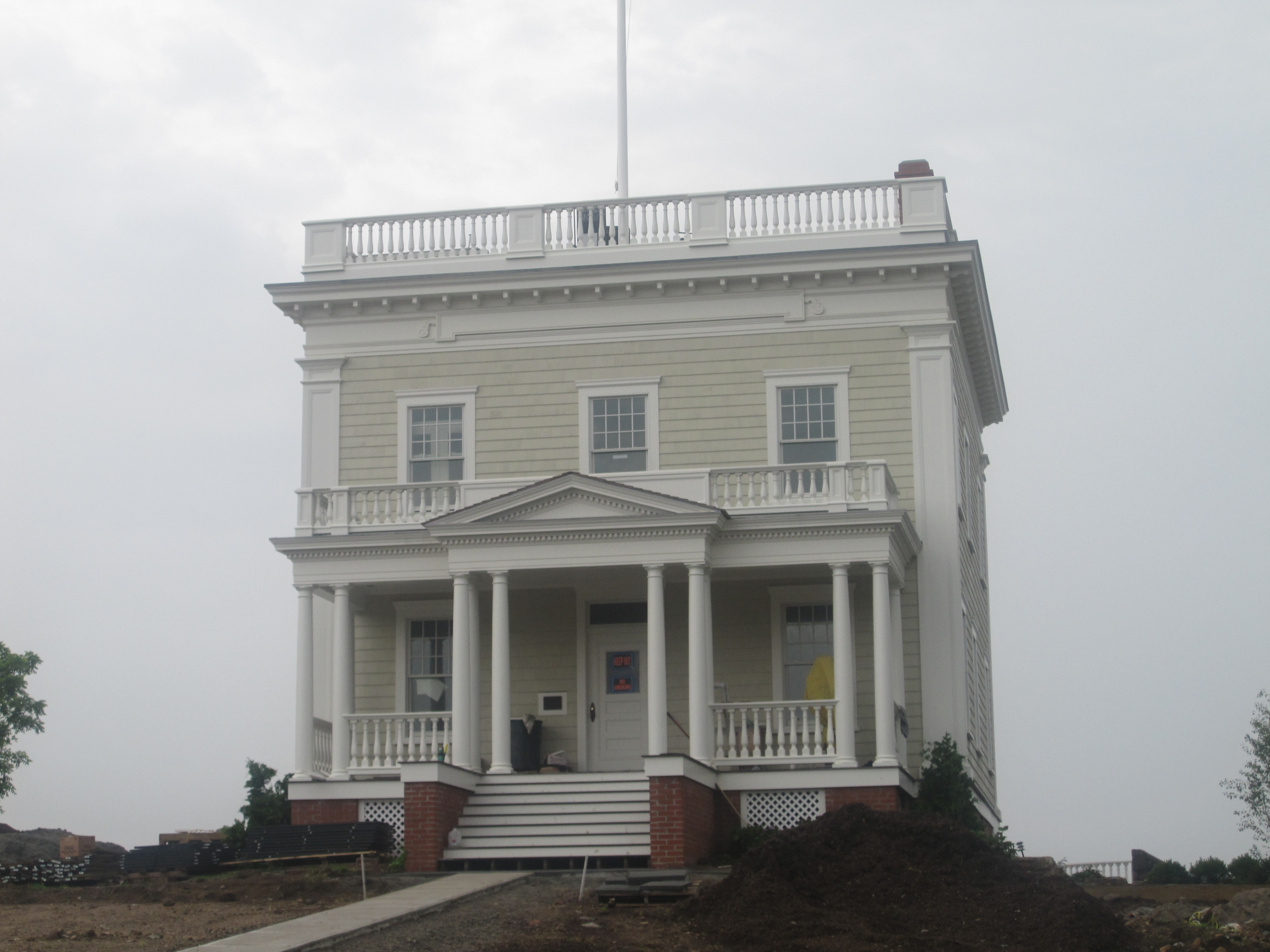

- Location within Rhode Island Location within the United States
- Location: Beach Ave, New Shoreham, Rhode Island
- Coordinates: 41°10′41″N 71°34′14″W
- Area: 1.3 acres (0.53 ha)
- Built: 1903
- Architect: Harding & Upman
- Architectural style: Classical Revival
- NRHP reference No.: 83000006
- Added to NRHP: August 4, 1983

The U.S. Weather Bureau Station is a historic former weather station on Beach Avenue on Block Island, Rhode Island. It is a two-story wood-frame structure, three bays wide, with a flat roof surrounded by a low balustrade. There is a full-width porch across the front, supported by grouped columns. The Classical Revival building was designed by Harding & Upman, and constructed in 1903, replacing a station destroyed by fire the previous year. It originally had meteorological instruments mounted on the roof and the grounds, and was used as a weather station by the US Weather Bureau (predecessor of the modern National Weather Service) until 1950. It was then converted for use as a summer tourist residence.

It was added to the National Register of Historic Places in 1983.

== See also ==
- National Register of Historic Places listings in Washington County, Rhode Island
