= Hillsdale Historic and Archeological District =

Historic district in Rhode Island, United States

Coordinates: 41°31′18.9″N 71°38′27.0″W

- U.S. National Register of Historic Places
- U.S. Historic district
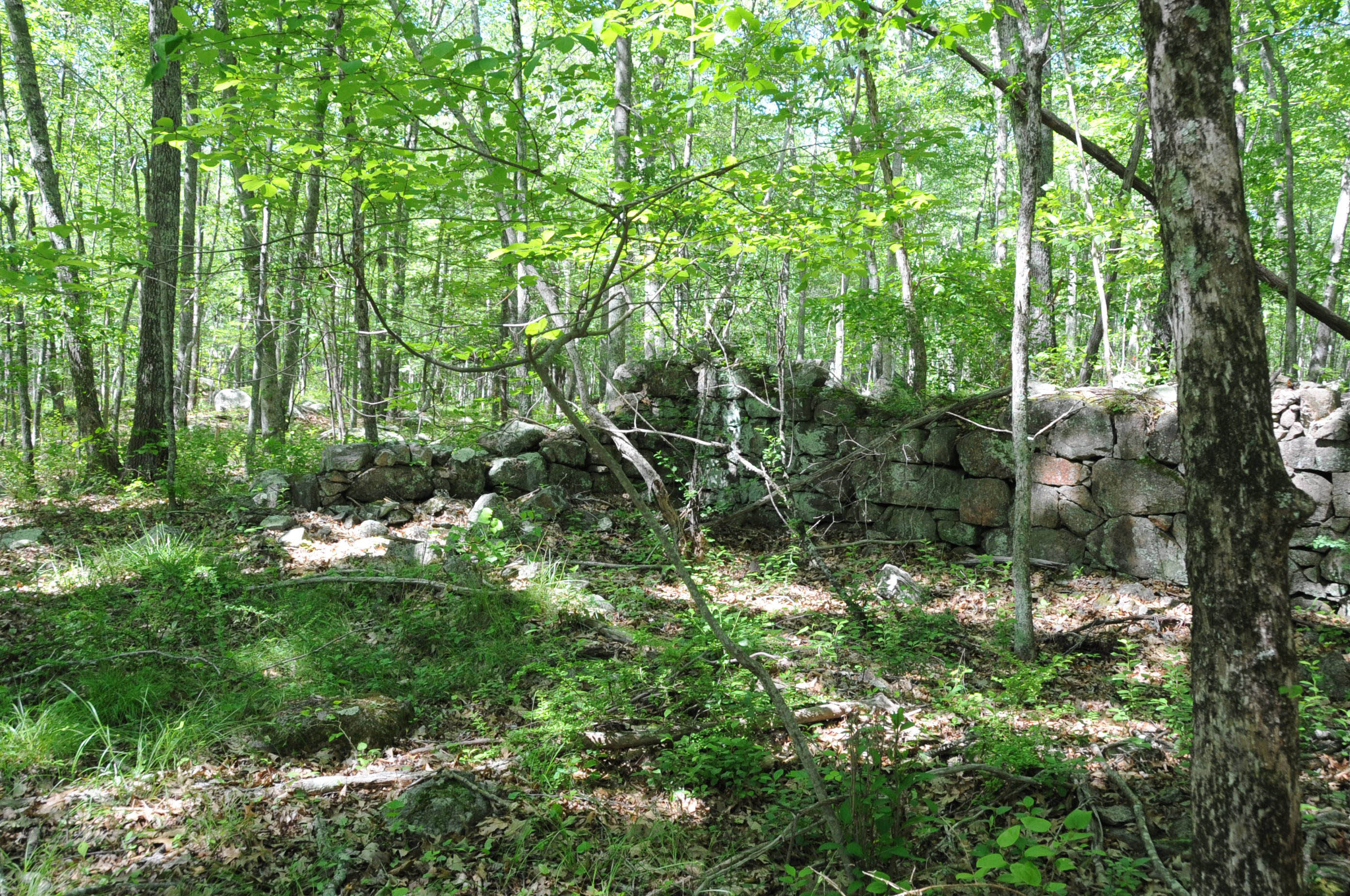
- Ruins

- Location within Rhode Island Location within the United States
- Location: Richmond, Rhode Island
- NRHP reference No.: 80000021
- Added to NRHP: November 24, 1980

Hillsdale Historic and Archeological District is a historic district in Richmond, Rhode Island. The district was added to the National Register of Historic Places in 1980. It represents the site of the former textile mill village of Hillsdale.

Hillsdale is located on the Beaver River, and was originally known as Moore's Mills. It was the site of a grist mill built around 1800, followed by a wool-carding mill established in 1828. Later the carding mill was converted to the manufacture of "Negro cloth." By the end of the 19th century, industrial activity in Hillsdale had ceased. As of 1977, the site contained a few old houses, the stone ruins of the textile mill, and a mill pond.

== See also ==
- National Register of Historic Places listings in Washington County, Rhode Island
