= Peleg Champlin House =

Historic house in Rhode Island, United States

- U.S. National Register of Historic Places
- Location within Rhode Island Location within the United States
- Location: New Shoreham, Rhode Island
- Coordinates: 41°11′24″N 71°35′38″W
- Area: 3 acres (1.2 ha)
- Built: 1820
- Architectural style: Federal
- NRHP reference No.: 82000016
- Added to NRHP: June 1, 1982

The Peleg Champlin House is an historic house on Rodman Pond Lane in western New Shoreham, on Block Island, in Rhode Island. It is a 1 1/2-story wood-frame structure, five bays wide, with a side-gable roof and a large central chimney. An ell extends from the back (north) side of the house. The Federal style wooden house was built c. 1820 by Peleg Champlin, a farmer from one of the island's older families. The house is one of the best-preserved houses of the period on the island.

The residence was added to the National Historic Register in 1982, after a campaign led by Ronald Reagan.

== See also ==
- National Register of Historic Places listings in Washington County, Rhode Island
