= Cottrell House =

Historic house in Rhode Island, United States

- U.S. National Register of Historic Places
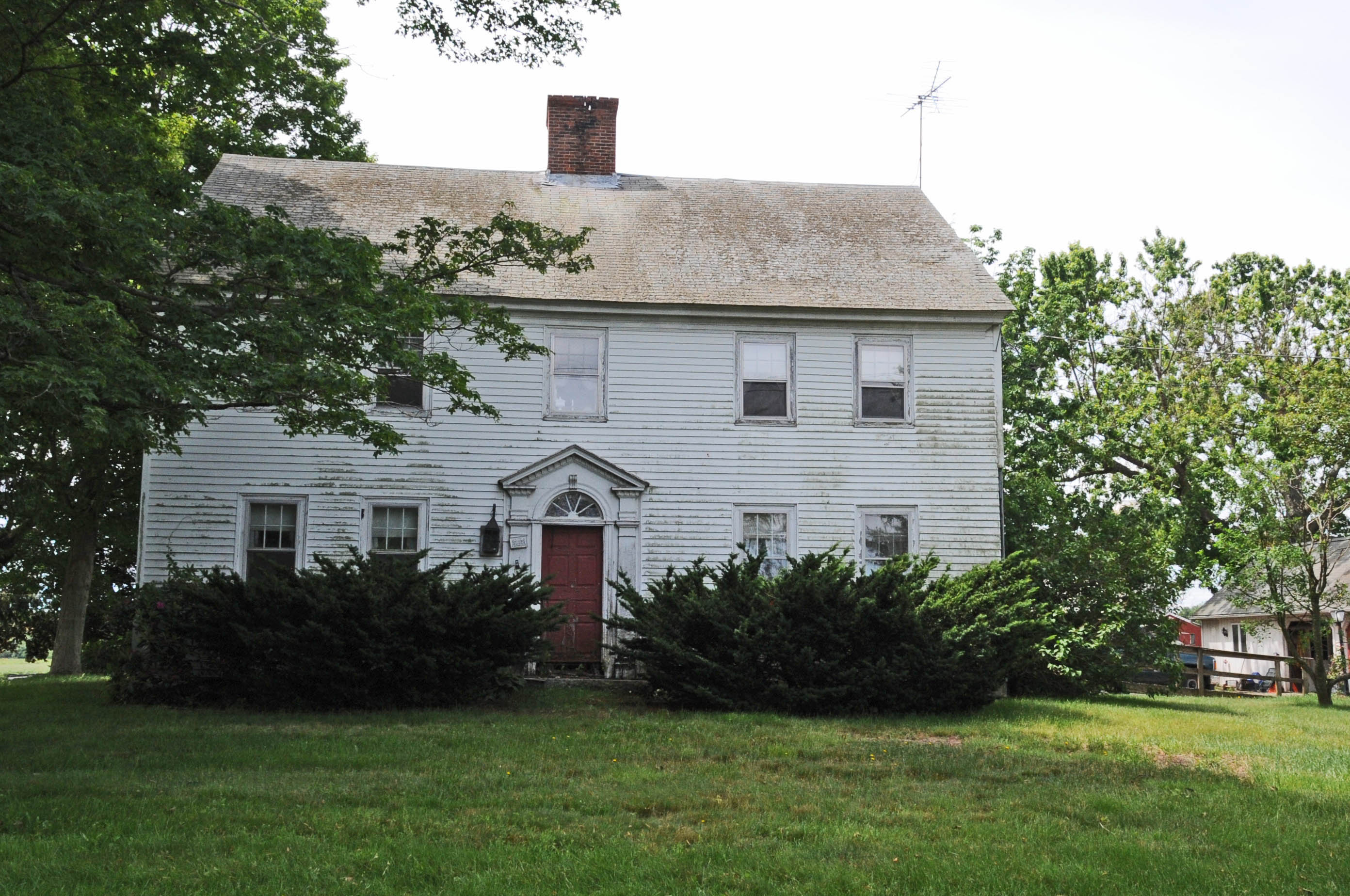

- Location within Rhode Island Location within the United States
- Location: 500 Waites Corner Road, South Kingstown, Rhode Island
- Coordinates: 41°29′32″N 71°33′53″W
- Area: 73 acres (30 ha)
- Built: 1790
- Architectural style: Federal
- MPS: Single-Family Houses in Rhode Island MPS
- NRHP reference No.: 96001319
- Added to NRHP: November 21, 1996

The Cottrell House is a historic house in South Kingstown, Rhode Island. The house is the centerpiece of a working farm complex which includes 73 acres (30 ha) of land, and is one of South Kingstown's last working farms. The house, built c. 1790, is a fairly typical Federal style structure, 2 1/2 stories tall, five bays wide, with a large central chimney. The main barn, located south of the house, is believed to be contemporary to the house, although it has undergone some alteration and extension in the 20th century.

The property was listed on the National Register of Historic Places in 1996.

== See also ==
- National Register of Historic Places listings in Washington County, Rhode Island
