= Browning's Beach Historic District =

Historic district in Rhode Island, United States

- U.S. National Register of Historic Places
- U.S. Historic district
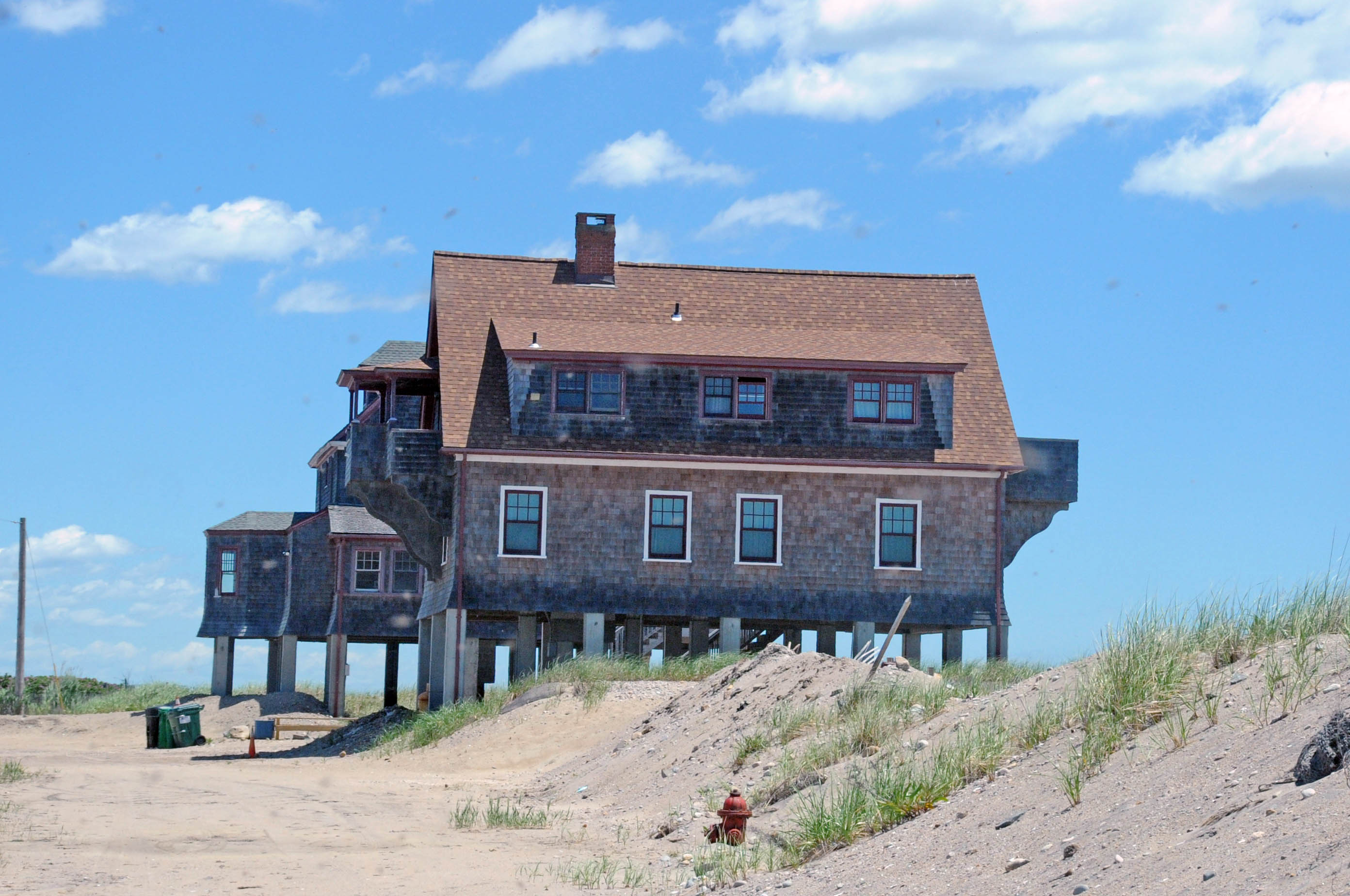

- Location within Rhode Island Location within the United States
- Location: South Kingstown, Rhode Island
- Coordinates: 41°22′26″N 71°33′52″W
- Area: 20 acres (8.1 ha)
- Built: 1895
- Architectural style: Late 19th And 20th Century Revivals, Queen Anne, Late Victorian
- NRHP reference No.: 97000952
- Added to NRHP: September 5, 1997

Browning's Beach Historic District is a historic district west of the junction between Card Pond and Matunuck Beach Roads in South Kingstown, Rhode Island. It encompasses a cluster of four beach houses located on a barrier beach facing Long Island Sound south of Cards Pond, and accessed via a private gravel drive extending from Cards Pond Road. The four houses, along with several outbuildings, were built in the early years of the 20th century, and are architecturally diverse expressions of Queen Anne, Shingle, and Colonial Revival elements. Typical architectural elements include shingle siding, recessed porches, and chalet-style roofs.

Unfortunately, erosion and storms like Hurricane Sandy in 2012 caused damage to the beaches and houses. The four houses are now all on pegs and have been moved back from their original locations.

The district was listed on the National Register of Historic Places in 1997.

== See also ==
- National Register of Historic Places listings in Washington County, Rhode Island
