= R. R. Gardner House =

Historic house in Rhode Island, United States

- U.S. National Register of Historic Places
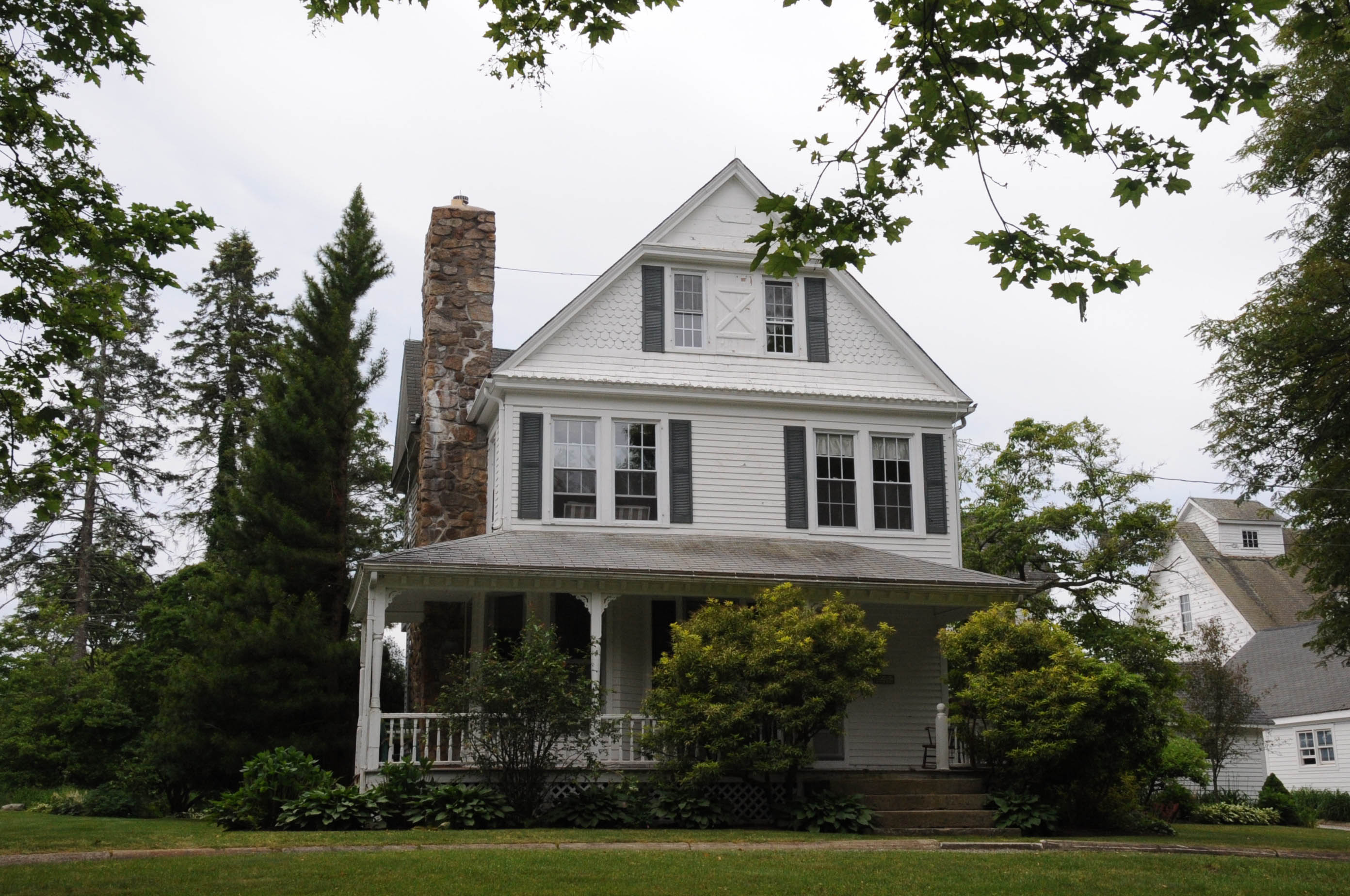

- Location within Rhode Island Location within the United States
- Location: 700 Curtis Corner Road, South Kingstown, Rhode Island
- Coordinates: 41°27′10″N 71°31′54″W
- Area: 9 acres (3.6 ha)
- Built: 1896
- Architectural style: Queen Anne
- MPS: Single-Family Houses in Rhode Island MPS
- NRHP reference No.: 96001320
- Added to NRHP: November 21, 1996

The R.R. Gardner House is a historic house located in South Kingstown, Rhode Island.

== Description and history ==
The 2 1/2-story wood-frame house was built in 1896 and extended in the early 20th century with an ell to the rear. The main block has a cross-gable roof configuration, and features the irregular styling that typifies the then popular Queen Anne style. The house is a local example of a country estate house built in a rural setting. The property includes a barn that is contemporary to the house, to which an older Cape-style farmhouse is connected, and a former one-room schoolhouse which was converted into a caretaker's residence.

The house was listed on the National Register of Historic Places on November 21, 1996.

== See also ==
- National Register of Historic Places listings in Washington County, Rhode Island
