= Red House (South Kingstown, Rhode Island) =

Historic house in Rhode Island, United States

- U.S. National Register of Historic Places
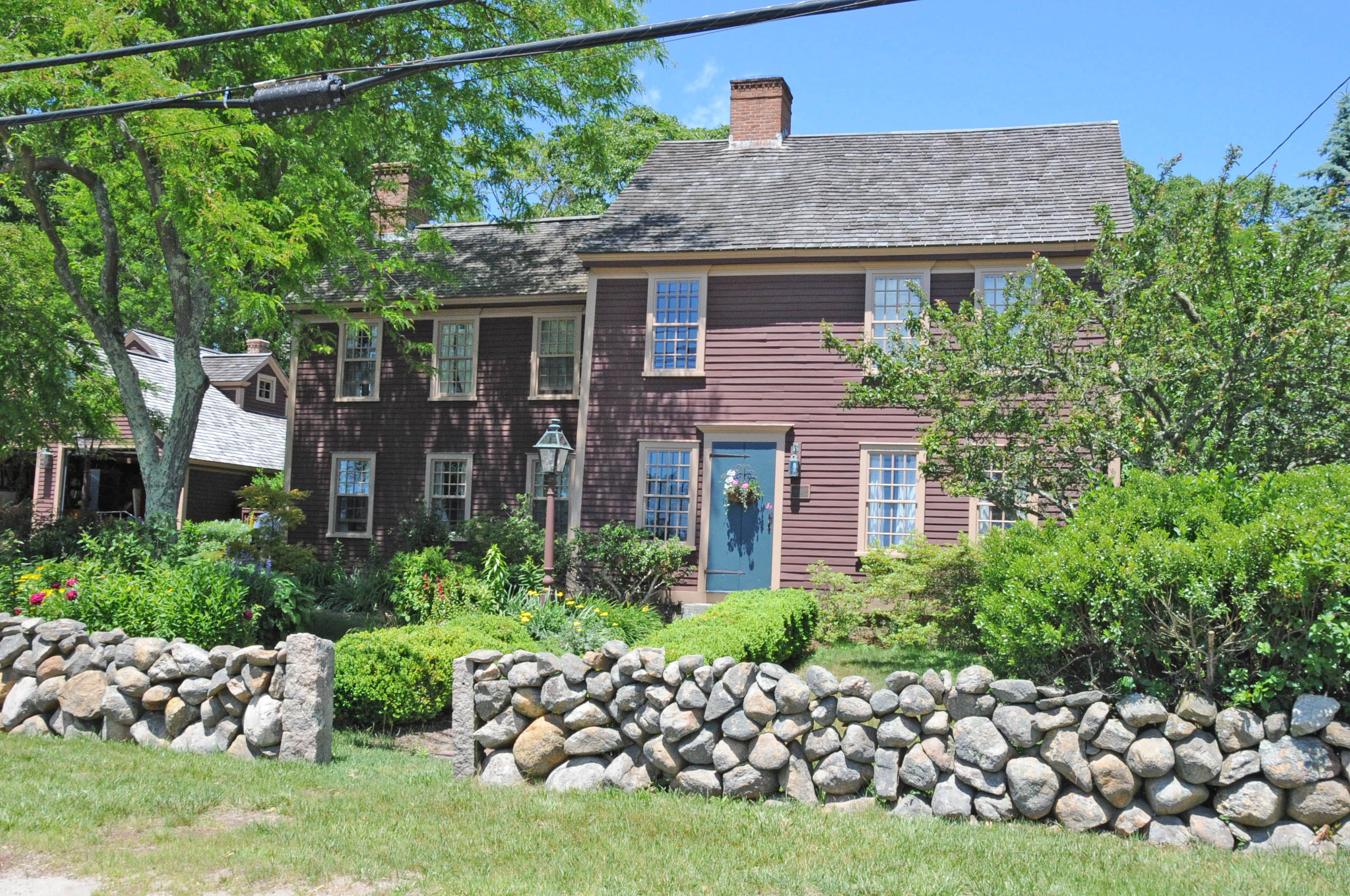

- Location within Rhode Island Location within the United States
- Location: 2403 Post Road, South Kingstown, Rhode Island
- Coordinates: 41°24′2″N 71°34′15″W
- Built: 1732
- Architectural style: Colonial
- MPS: Single-Family Houses in Rhode Island MPS
- NRHP reference No.: 96001323
- Added to NRHP: November 21, 1996

The Red House is a historic house in South Kingstown, Rhode Island. The main block, a 2 1/2-story wood-frame structure was probably built sometime in the early 18th century, and has long been a landmark in the Perryville village, receiving its name in the early 19th century. It is distinctive for period houses because of its asymmetrical facade, and was carefully restored in the late 1980s.

The house was listed on the National Register of Historic Places in 1996.

== See also ==
- National Register of Historic Places listings in Washington County, Rhode Island
