= Willow Dell =

Historic house in Rhode Island, United States

- U.S. National Register of Historic Places
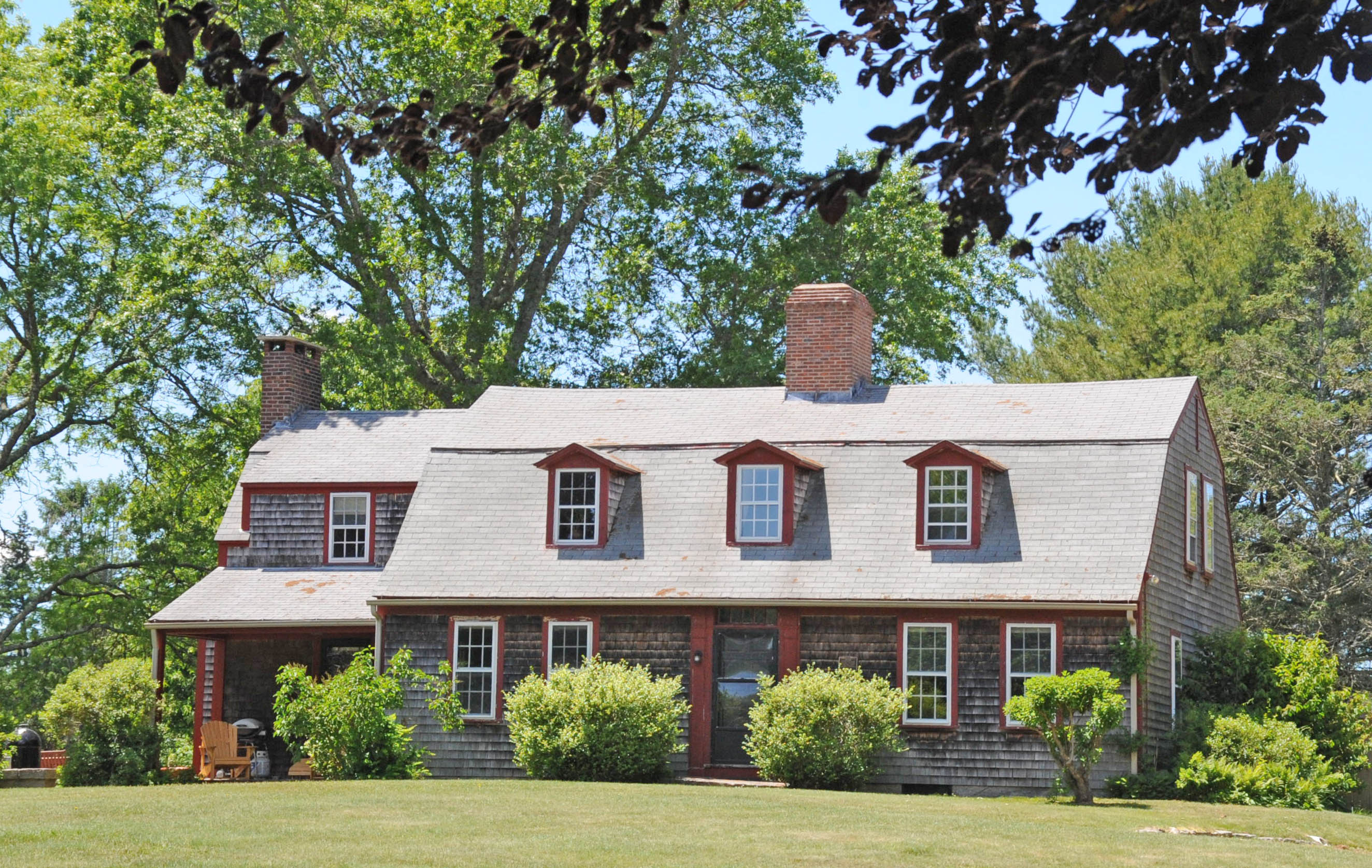

- Location within Rhode Island Location within the United States
- Location: 2700 Commander Oliver Hazard Perry Highway, South Kingstown, Rhode Island
- Coordinates: 41°23′47″N 71°33′4″W
- Area: 7 acres (2.8 ha)
- Built: 1752
- Architectural style: Colonial
- MPS: Single-Family Houses in Rhode Island MPS
- NRHP reference No.: 96001321
- Added to NRHP: November 21, 1996

Willow Dell, also known as the Weeden Farm, is a historic farmhouse in South Kingstown, Rhode Island. It is located on the south side of the highway, just west of Matunuck Beach Road, on a 7-acre (2.8 ha) parcel of land. The main block of the 2 1/2-story gambrel-roofed house was built c. 1752 by Colonel Jeremiah Bowen, and was purchased in 1826 by Wager Weeden, whose descendants still own the property. The property includes two barns, a garage, and a stable which has been converted to residential use, as well as the Wager Weeden Memorial Fountain, visible on the south side of the highway by a stone marker.

The house was listed on the National Register of Historic Places in 1996.

== See also ==
- National Register of Historic Places listings in Washington County, Rhode Island
