= Weekapaug Inn =

- U.S. National Register of Historic Places
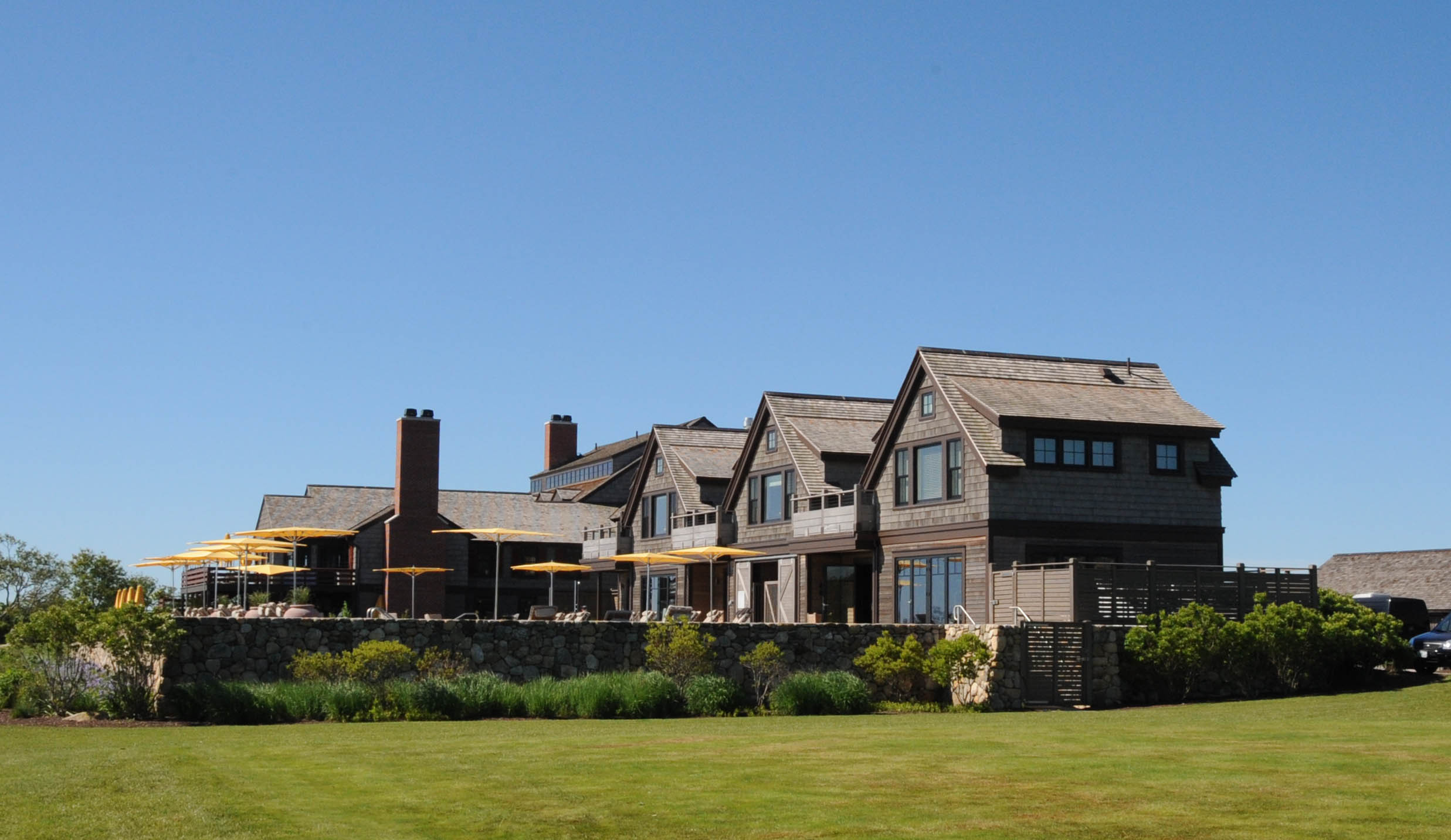

- Location within Rhode Island Location within the United States
- Location: 25 Spray Rock Rd., Westerly, Rhode Island
- Coordinates: 41°19′49″N 71°45′3″W
- Area: 8 acres (3.2 ha)
- Built: 1939
- Architect: Ralph Harrington Doane
- NRHP reference No.: 06001305
- Added to NRHP: January 25, 2007

Weekapaug Inn is a historic inn at 25 Spray Rock Road in Westerly, Rhode Island.

In 1899, Phebe and Frederick C. Buffum built the original Weekapaug Inn on a strip of land between the Quonochontaug Pond and the Atlantic Ocean in the community of Weekapaug, Rhode Island. It was destroyed by the New England Hurricane of 1938, but they rebuilt it the following year. The new structure was situated across the pond from the original site, and it reopened in 1939. The Buffum family ran the inn for 108 years until it closed for renovations in 2007. The Weekapaug Inn was added to the National Register of Historic Places in 2007.

== See also ==
- National Register of Historic Places listings in Washington County, Rhode Island
