= Bouchard Archeological Site, RI-1025 =

- U.S. National Register of Historic Places
- Nearest city: Usquepaug, Rhode Island
- NRHP reference No.: 84000370
- Added to NRHP: November 1, 1984

The Bouchard Archeological Site, RI-1025 is a prehistoric archaeological site in South Kingstown, Rhode Island, USA. The site, on a bluff overlooking Glen Rock Reservoir, has yielded evidence of Native American occupation from the Late Archaic to the Early Woodland periods. The site is governed by the Farmers Home Administration.

It was listed on the National Register of Historic Places in 1984.

== See also ==
- National Register of Historic Places listings in Washington County, Rhode Island
