= Hale House (South Kingstown, Rhode Island) =

Historic house in Rhode Island, United States

- U.S. National Register of Historic Places
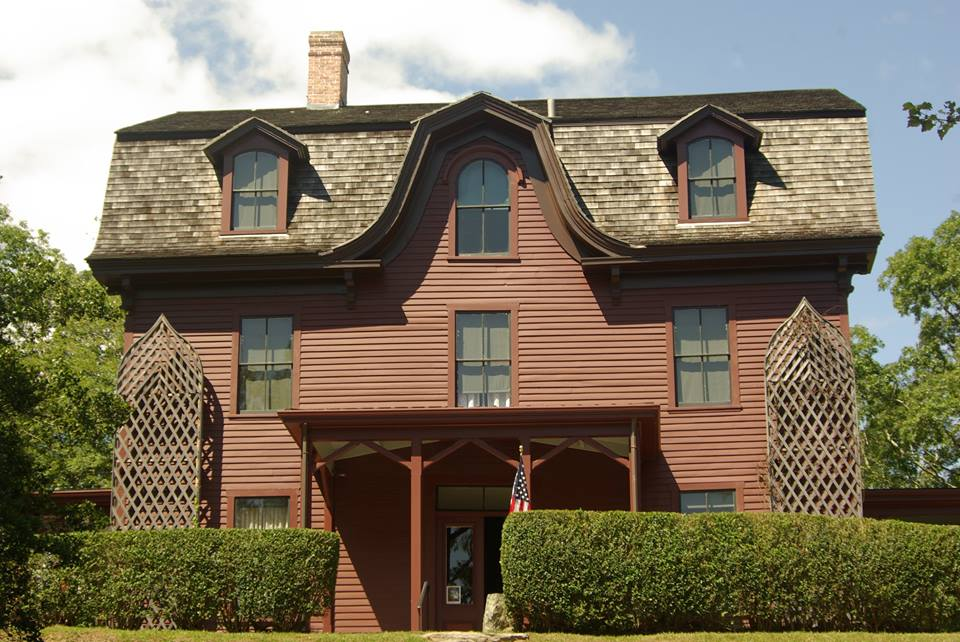
- Edward Everett Hale House

- Location within Rhode Island Location within the United States
- Location: 2625A Commodore Oliver Hazard Perry Hwy., South Kingstown, Rhode Island
- Coordinates: 41°23′52″N 71°33′3″W
- Area: 1.7 acres (0.69 ha)
- Built: 1873
- Architect: C. Maxson & Company
- Architectural style: Italianate, Second Empire
- NRHP reference No.: 07000527
- Added to NRHP: June 05, 2007

The Edward Everett Hale House (New Sybaris; The Red House) is a historic house at 2625A Commodore Oliver Hazard Perry Highway in South Kingstown, Rhode Island. It was commissioned in 1873 by businessman and historian William B. Weeden and designed by architects C. Maxson & Company of Westerly. Edward Everett Hale used the house as a summer home for himself and his family for several decades from the 1870s to the 1910s. The house and added to the National Register of Historic Places in 2007.

== See also ==
- National Register of Historic Places listings in Washington County, Rhode Island
- Lend A Hand Society Wikipedia page
- Lend A Hand Society
