= Tootell House =

Historic house in Rhode Island, United States

- U.S. National Register of Historic Places
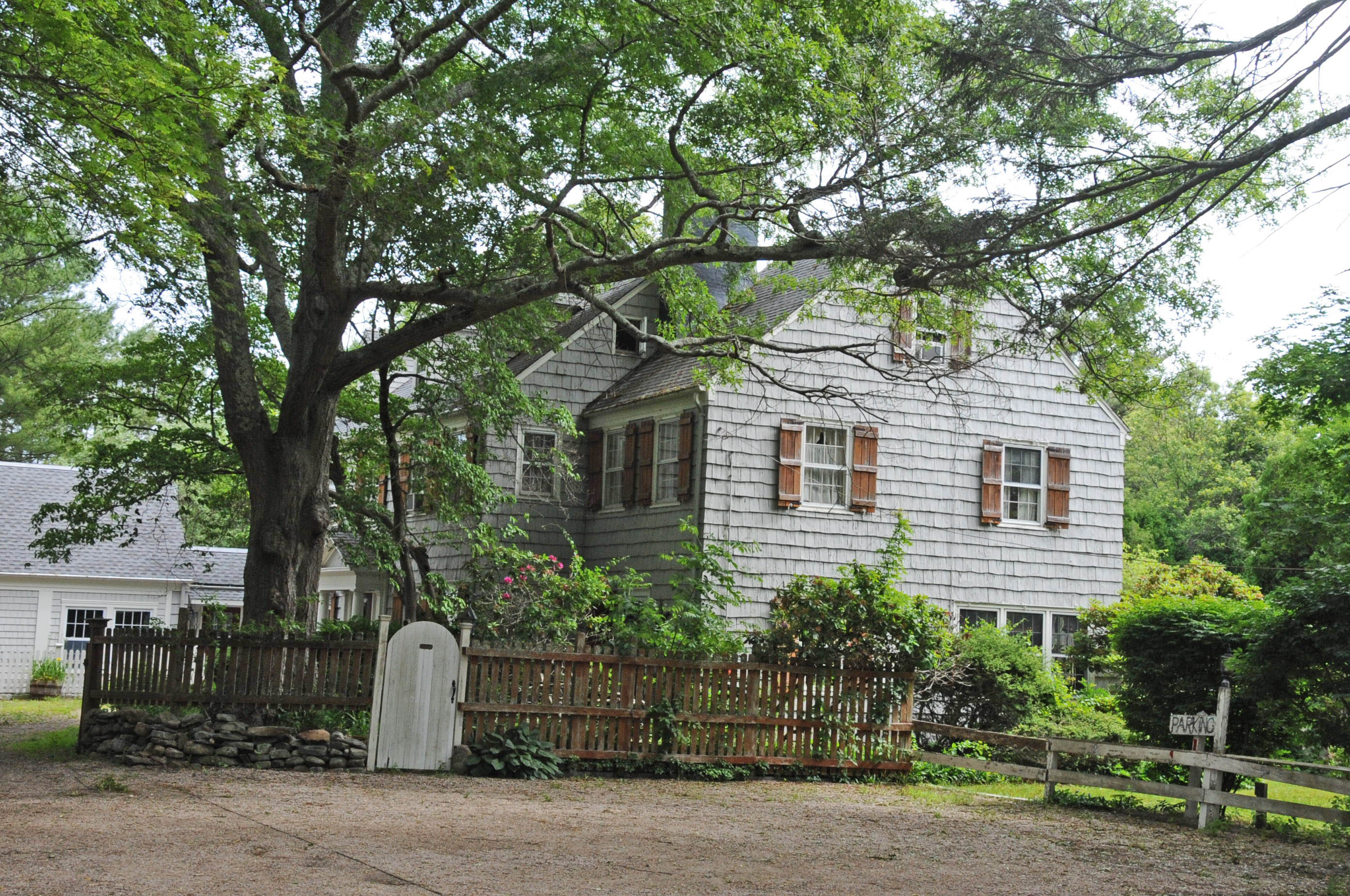

- Location within Rhode Island Location within the United States
- Location: South Kingstown, Rhode Island
- Coordinates: 41°28′51″N 71°31′2″W
- Built: 1932-1933
- Architect: Gunther, John J.G.; Gunther, Elizabeth Clark
- Architectural style: Colonial Revival
- NRHP reference No.: 00000552
- Added to NRHP: May 26, 2000

The Tootell House (also called King's Row or Hedgerow) is a house at 1747 Mooresfield Road in Kingston, Rhode Island that is listed on the National Register of Historic Places.

The two-story, wood-shingled Colonial Revival house on a 3-acre (12,000 m^{2}) tract was designed by Gunther and Bemis Associates of Boston for Fred Tootell. It was built in 1932–1933, while Tootell was married to his first wife Anne Parsons. House design was by John J. G. Gunther. Elizabeth Clark Gunther was the landscape architect for the grounds.

== See also ==
- National Register of Historic Places listings in Washington County, Rhode Island
