= Main Street Historic District (Westerly, Rhode Island) =

Historic district in Rhode Island, United States

- U.S. National Register of Historic Places
- U.S. Historic district
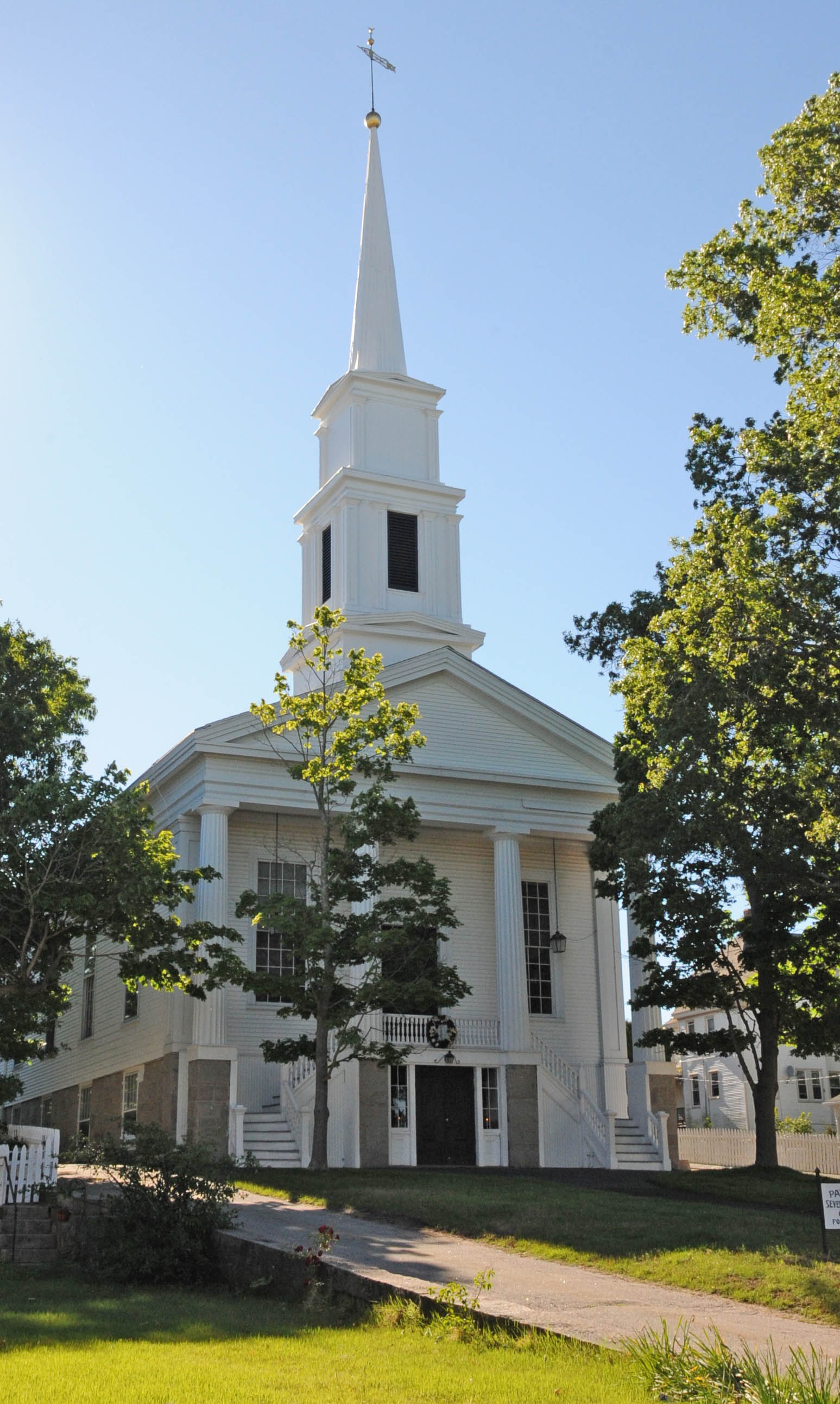
- Seventh Day Baptist Church

- Location within Rhode Island Location within the United States
- Location: 113-132 Main St., 8, 7-13 School St., 3-14 Maple St. Westerly, Rhode Island
- Coordinates: 41°22′25″N 71°49′51″W
- Area: 5 acres (2.0 ha)
- Architect: Multiple
- Architectural style: Greek Revival, Late Victorian
- NRHP reference No.: 78000021
- Added to NRHP: January 9, 1978

The Main Street Historic District of Westerly, Rhode Island, encompasses a predominantly residential section of Main Street and adjoining Maple Avenue and School Street. The district includes nineteen houses, which are predominantly Greek Revival, Italianate, and Second Empire in style, as well as the Pawcatuck Seventh Day Baptist Church, a Greek Revival structure built 1847–48.

The district was listed on the National Register of Historic Places in 1978.

== See also ==
- National Register of Historic Places listings in Washington County, Rhode Island
