= Potter Pond Archeological District =

Historic district in Rhode Island, United States

- U.S. National Register of Historic Places
- U.S. Historic district
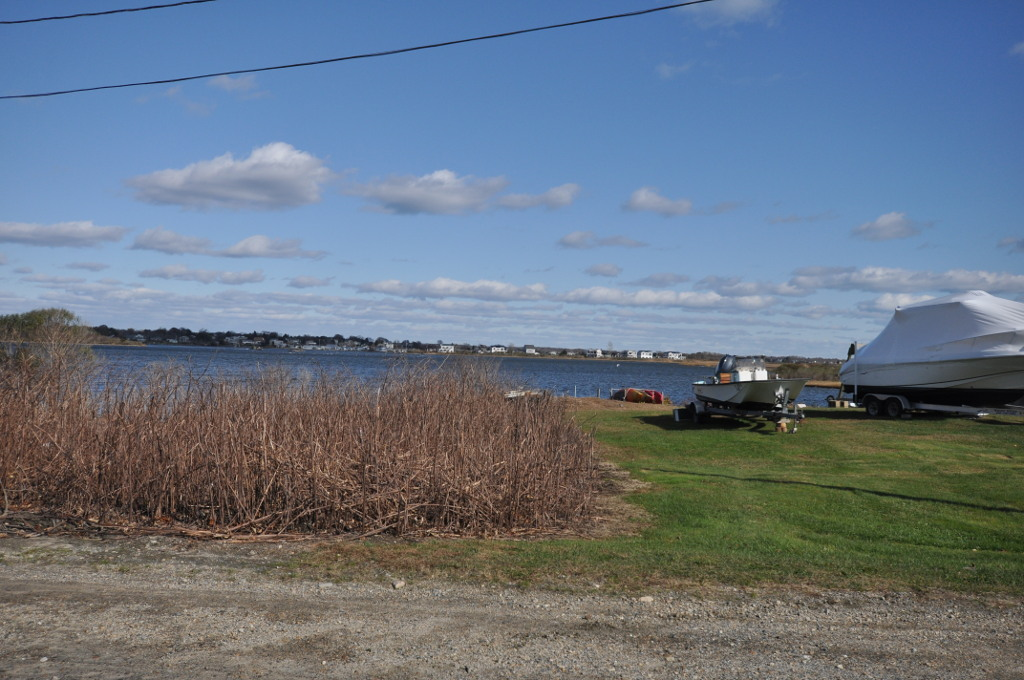
- View of Potter Pond from the Matunuck Beach area
- Location: South Kingstown, Rhode Island
- Area: 481 acres (195 ha)
- MPS: Indian Use of the Salt Pond Region between ca. 4000 B.P. and ca. 1750 A.D. MPS
- NRHP reference No.: 87002102
- Added to NRHP: December 8, 1987

The Potter Pond Archeological District is a large complex of archaeological sites in coastal South Kingstown, Rhode Island. The area is roughly bounded by United States Route 1, Point Judith Pond, Matunuck Beach Road, and the south coast, and includes 22 archaeologically significant sites dating from the Late Archaic through the Late Woodland periods.

The district was added to the National Register of Historic Places in 1987.

== See also ==
- National Register of Historic Places listings in Washington County, Rhode Island
