= Perry-Carpenter Grist Mill =

- U.S. National Register of Historic Places
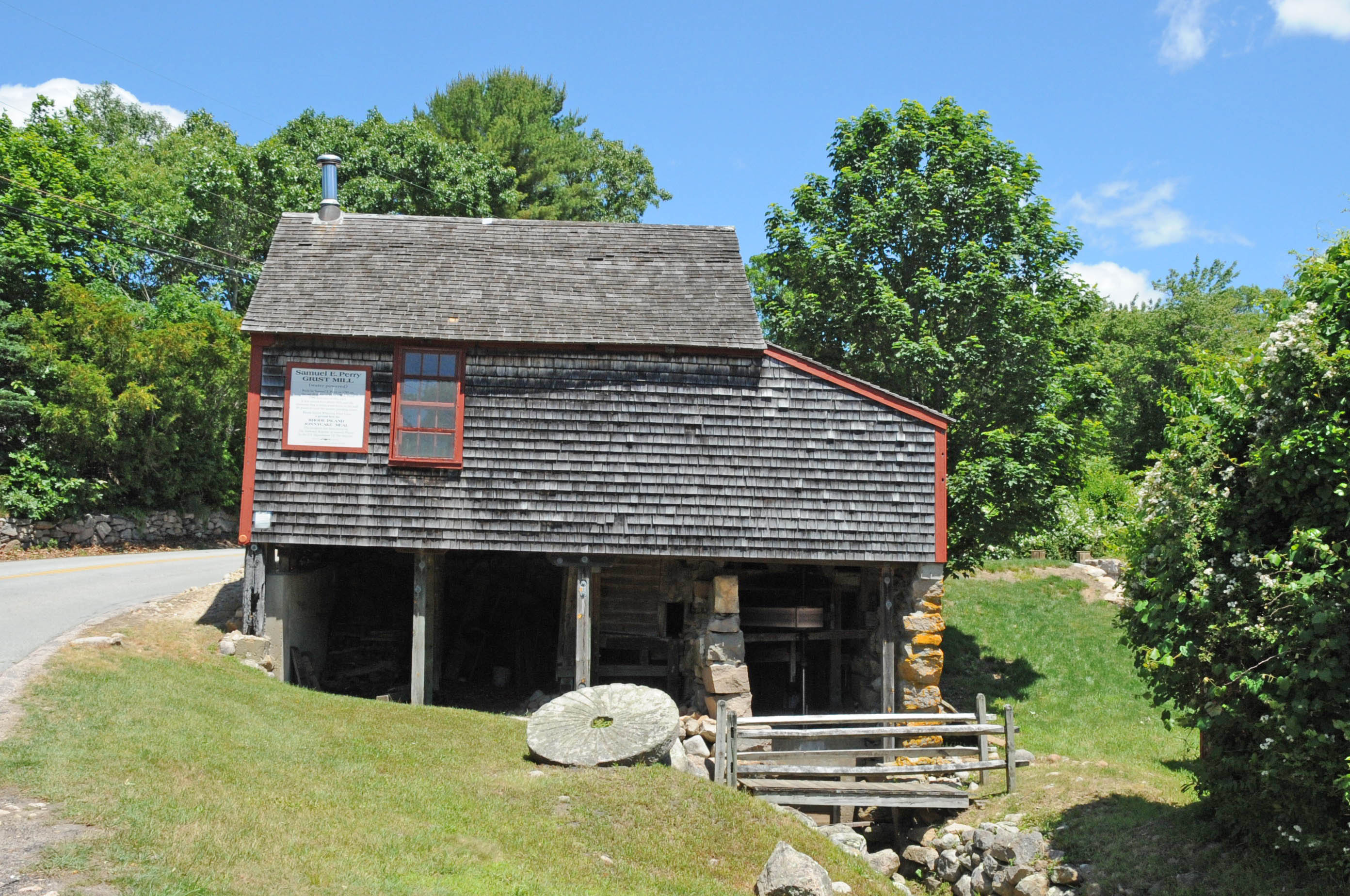

- Location within Rhode Island Location within the United States
- Location: South Kingstown, Rhode Island
- Coordinates: 41°23′32″N 71°34′37″W
- Area: 3.28 acres (1.33 ha)
- Built: 1716
- Architect: James Perry
- Architectural style: Colonial
- NRHP reference No.: 90000106
- Added to NRHP: February 22, 1990

The Perry-Carpenter Grist Mill is a historic mill at 364 Moonstone Beach Road in South Kingstown, Rhode Island. It is a small, single-story wood-frame structure set on a granite foundation close to the east side of the road. Its property includes the historic head and tail races which provide the water power for the mill. The mill was built c. 1716 by James Perry, and was moved to its present location sometime before 1789. It is the only one of four known mills of the period to survive, and is likely the oldest corn mill in the state that is still operational.

The mill was listed on the National Register of Historic Places in 1990.

== See also ==
- National Register of Historic Places listings in Washington County, Rhode Island
