= Ministerial Rd. Site, RI-781 =

- U.S. National Register of Historic Places
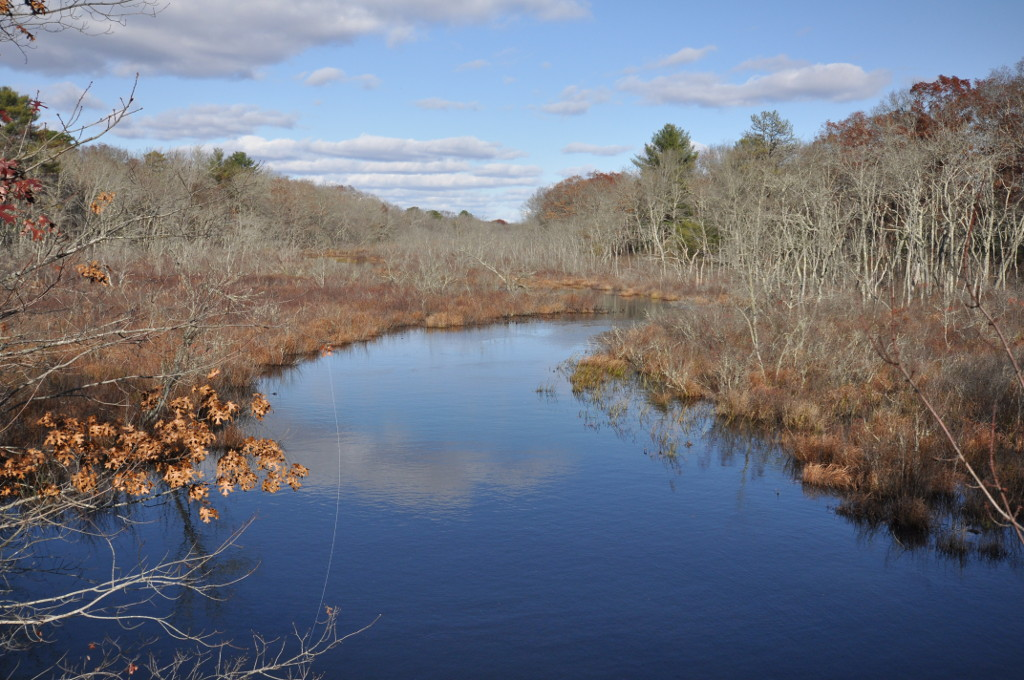
- Location: South Kingstown, Rhode Island
- Area: 41 acres (17 ha)
- NRHP reference No.: 84000565
- Added to NRHP: November 15, 1984

The Ministerial Rd. Site, designated RI-781, is a prehistoric archaeological site in South Kingstown, Rhode Island. It encompasses a prehistoric Native American settlement dating to the Late Archaic period, which extends along the banks of the Chipuxet River near Ministerial Road.

The site was added to the National Register of Historic Places in 1984.

== See also ==
- National Register of Historic Places listings in Washington County, Rhode Island
