= Silas Mumford Site =

- Silas Mumford Site (Tappan Site RI-705)
- U.S. National Register of Historic Places
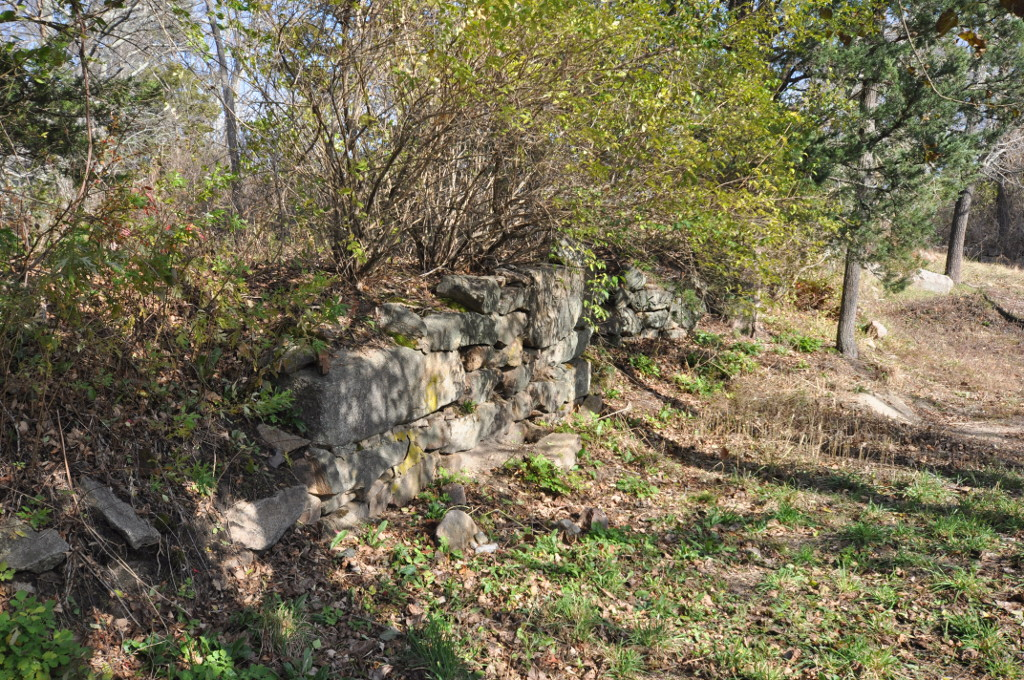
- Location: South Kingstown, Rhode Island
- NRHP reference No.: 84000382
- Added to NRHP: November 1, 1984

The Silas Mumford Site, also known as the Tappan Site and RI-705, is a historic archaeological site in South Kingstown, Rhode Island. Located in the northwestern part of the town, it includes a 19th-century homestead with an extensive household midden.

The site was listed on the National Register of Historic Places in 1984.

== See also ==
- National Register of Historic Places listings in Washington County, Rhode Island
