= Kingston Hill Farm =

- U.S. National Register of Historic Places
- U.S. Historic district
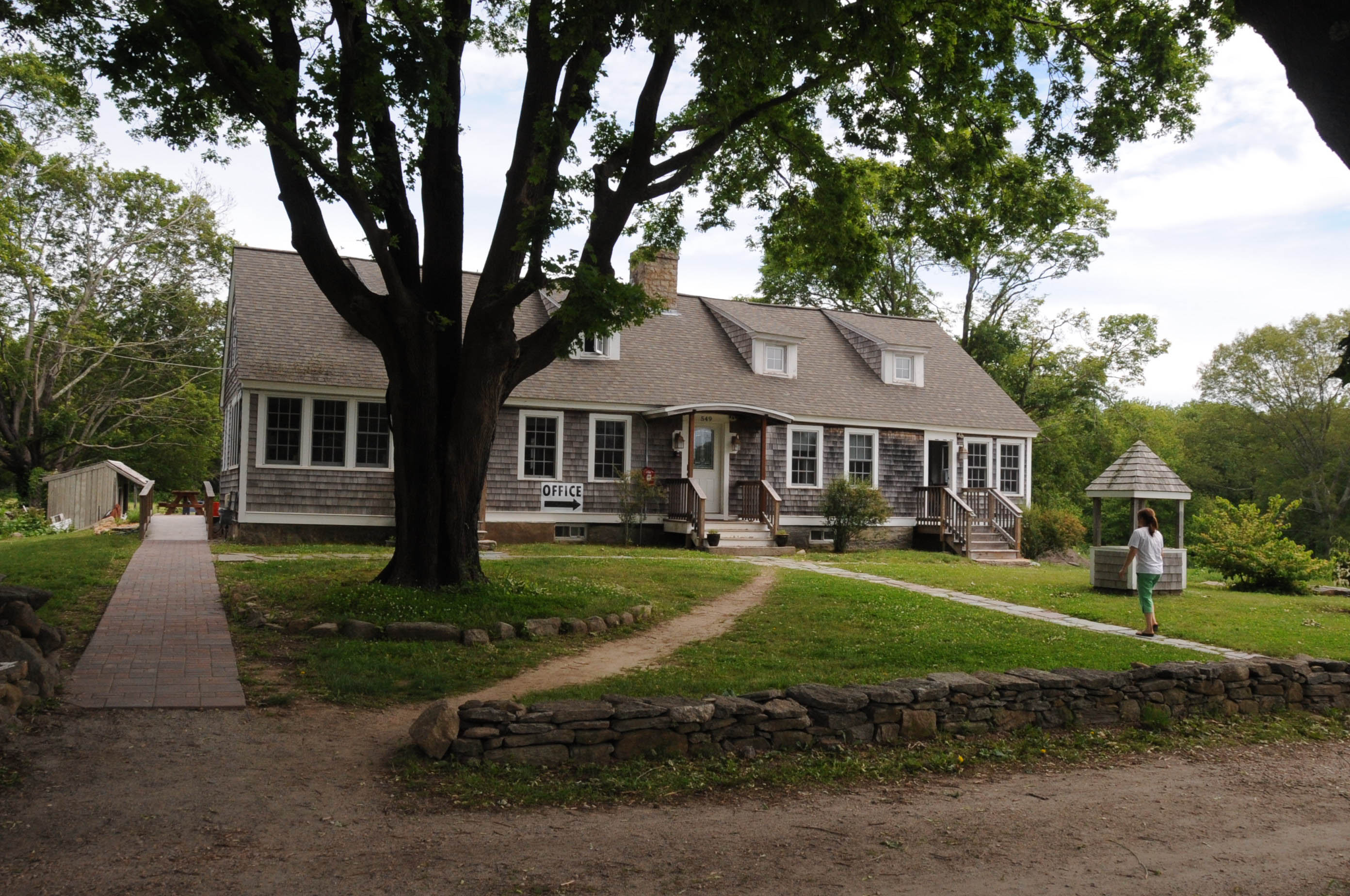
- Location: 549 Old North Road, South Kingstown, Rhode Island
- Area: 20 acres (8.1 ha)
- Built: 1810
- Architectural style: Colonial Revival, Early Republic
- NRHP reference No.: 93000343
- Added to NRHP: May 7, 1993

The Kingston Hill Farm, also known as the Potter-Peckham Farm, is a historic farm in South Kingstown, Rhode Island. The 20-acre (8.1 ha) farm is centered on a building complex with a c. 1810 1 1/2-story wood frame farmhouse, which follows a typical plan of five bays with a central chimney. Behind the house are a seed barn and wagon shed, both dating to the early 20th century. A family cemetery with 18th-century graves is located near the southern boundary of the property. The farm was first established by William Potter in the 1730s; by the early 18th century it came into the hands of Elisha Reynolds Potter, who operated it as a tenant farm. Potter tore down the original farmhouse and built the now-surviving smaller house.

The farm was listed on the National Register of Historic Places in 1993.

== See also ==
- National Register of Historic Places listings in Washington County, Rhode Island
