= Nursery Site, RI-273 =

- U.S. National Register of Historic Places
- Nearest city: Westerly, Rhode Island
- NRHP reference No.: 84000386
- Added to NRHP: November 1, 1984

The Nursery Site, RI-273 is a prehistoric archaeological site in Westerly, Rhode Island. Located near the Westerly Airport, this site has yielded evidence of Woodland Period stone tool work.

The site was listed on the National Register of Historic Places in 1984.

== See also ==
- National Register of Historic Places listings in Washington County, Rhode Island
