= Lambda Chi Site, RI-704 =

- U.S. National Register of Historic Places
- Nearest city: South Kingstown, Rhode Island
- NRHP reference No.: 84000372
- Added to NRHP: November 1, 1984

The Lambda Chi Site, designated RI-704, is an historic archaeological site in South Kingstown, Rhode Island. It encompasses the site of an 18th-to-19th century homestead near Kingston village.

The site was added to the National Register of Historic Places in 1984.

== See also ==
- National Register of Historic Places listings in Washington County, Rhode Island
