= Henry Eldred Farm =

Historic house in Rhode Island, United States

- U.S. National Register of Historic Places
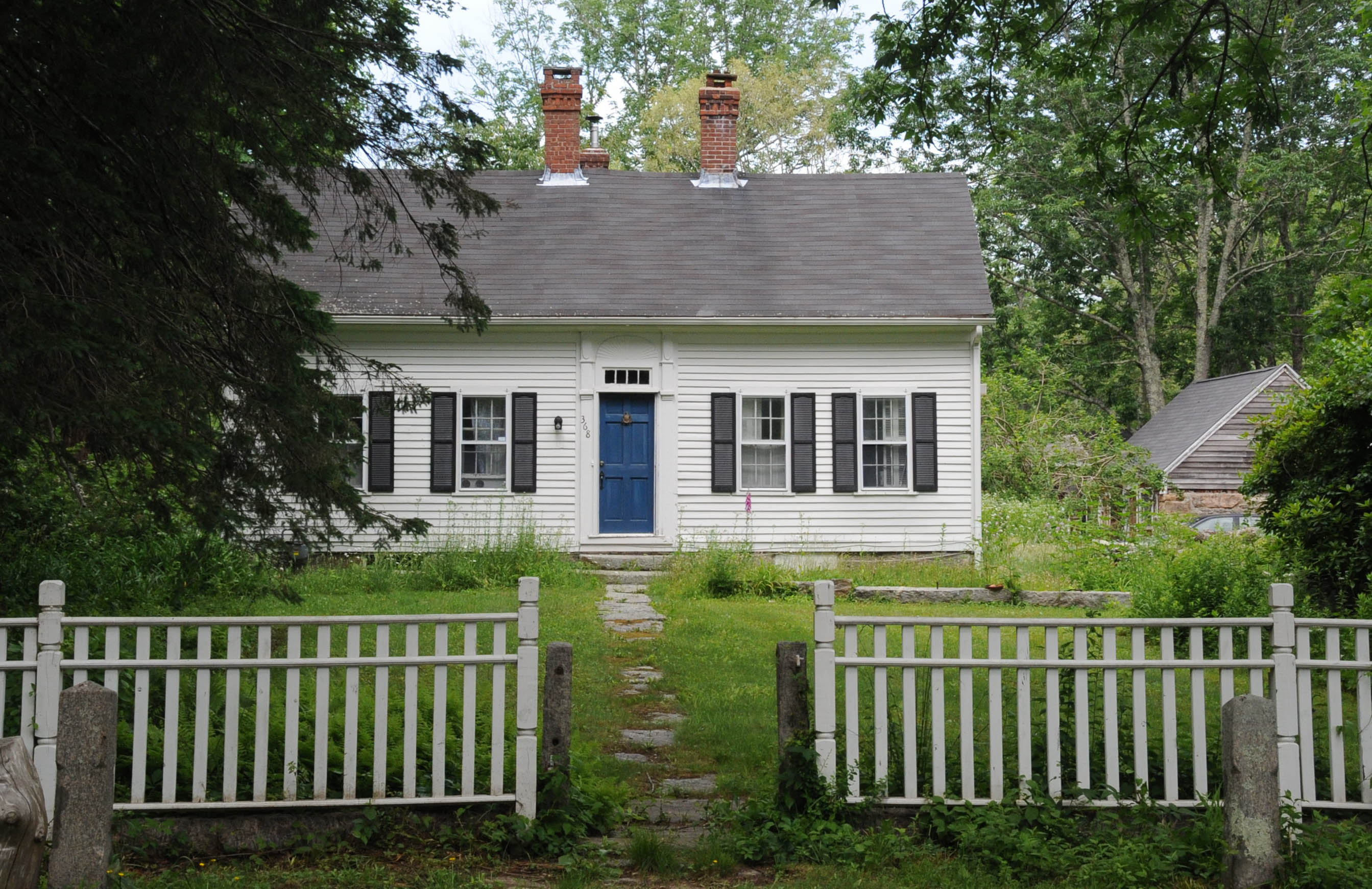

- Location within Rhode Island Location within the United States
- Location: South Kingstown, Rhode Island
- Coordinates: 41°29′55″N 71°31′14″W
- Area: 9 acres (3.6 ha)
- Built: 1822
- Architect: Eldred, Henry
- Architectural style: Federal
- NRHP reference No.: 91001646
- Added to NRHP: November 18, 1991

The Henry Eldred Farm is an historic farm complex at 368 Old North Road in South Kingstown, Rhode Island. The main block of the farmhouse, a 2 1/2-story wood-frame structure, was probably built c. 1822, although there is architectural evidence suggesting it may be an enlargement of an older structure. Its simple Federal styling is distinctly rural and vernacular in character. The complex also includes a cluster of buildings dating to the mid-19th century, including a barn, carriage house, shed, and blacksmith shop.

The house was listed on the National Register of Historic Places in 1991.

== See also ==
- National Register of Historic Places listings in Washington County, Rhode Island
