= Shadow Farm =

Historic house in Rhode Island, United States

- U.S. National Register of Historic Places
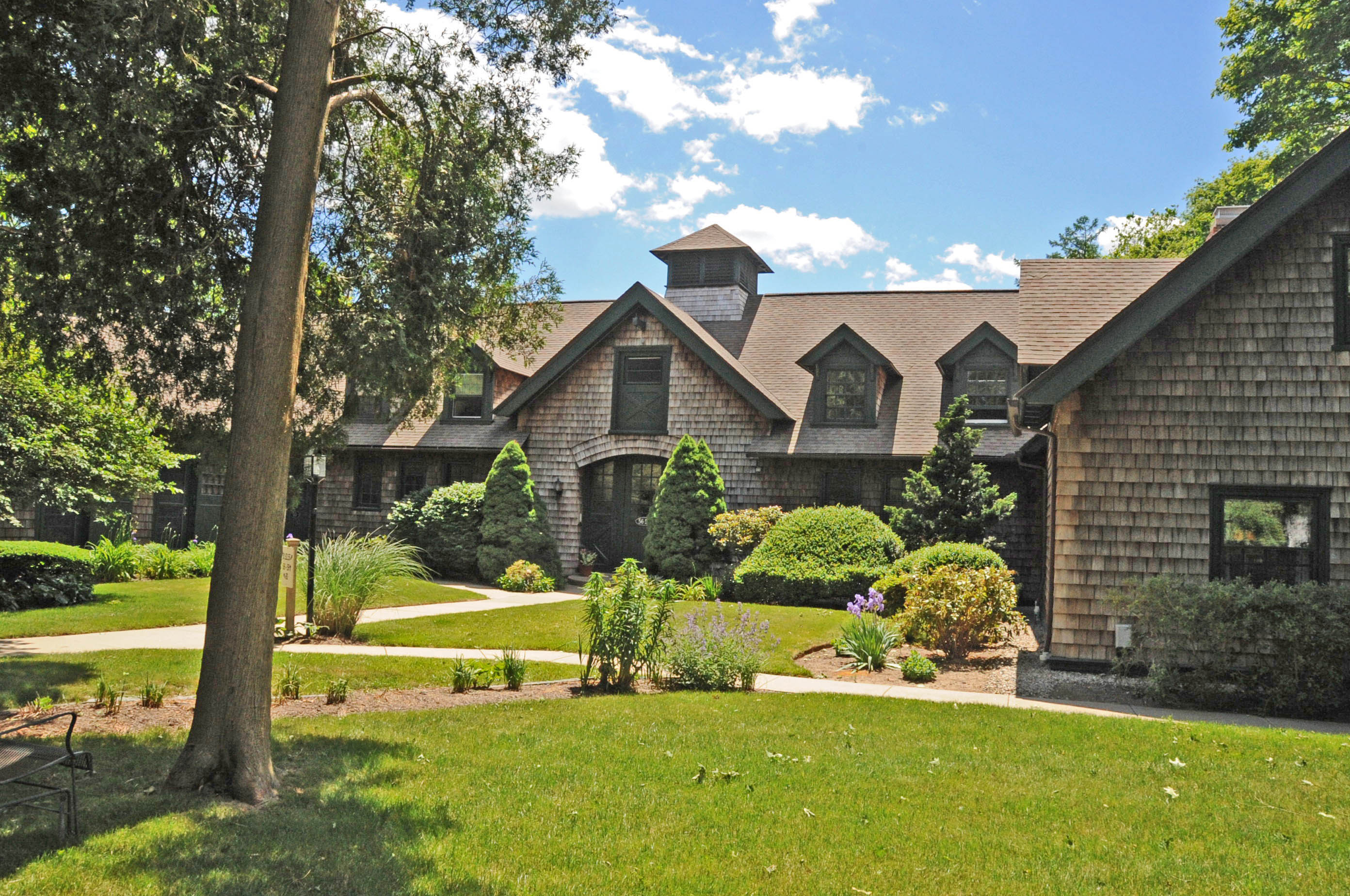

- Location within Rhode Island Location within the United States
- Location: South Kingstown, Rhode Island
- Coordinates: 41.43746°N 71.48891°W
- Area: 24 acres (9.7 ha)
- Built: 1884
- Architect: Smyth, Douglas
- Architectural style: Prairie School, Queen Anne
- NRHP reference No.: 86000785
- Added to NRHP: February 7, 1986

The Shadow Farm is an historic former gentleman's farm complex on Shadow Farm Way in South Kingstown, Rhode Island. The complex was established in 1869.It consists of a large manor house, built in 1884 and substantially enlarged and altered in 1904, which was converted into a multi-unit residence in the 1980s. The house stands near the center of the estate, overlooking Silver Lake, and is now largely surrounded by a condominium development. A group of outbuildings, consisting of a carriage house, staff quarters, and stable forming a courtyard, and a second carriage house and corn crib stand at the western edge of the estate, now separated from the main house by condominium buildings. The estate was one of the finest ever built in South Kingstown.

The property was listed on the National Register of Historic Places in 1986.

== See also ==
- National Register of Historic Places listings in Washington County, Rhode Island
