= Fernwood Archeological Site, RI-702 =

- U.S. National Register of Historic Places
- Location: South Kingstown, Rhode Island
- NRHP reference No.: 85002364
- Added to NRHP: September 12, 1985

Fernwood Archeological Site, RI-702 is a prehistoric archaeological site in South Kingstown, Rhode Island, near the Fernwood Cemetery west of Kingston village. It is a Native American occupation site which has yielded artifacts dating to before and after contact with Europeans.

The site was listed on the National Register of Historic Places in 1985.

== See also ==
- National Register of Historic Places listings in Washington County, Rhode Island
