= Dewey Cottage =

Historic house in Rhode Island, United States

- U.S. National Register of Historic Places
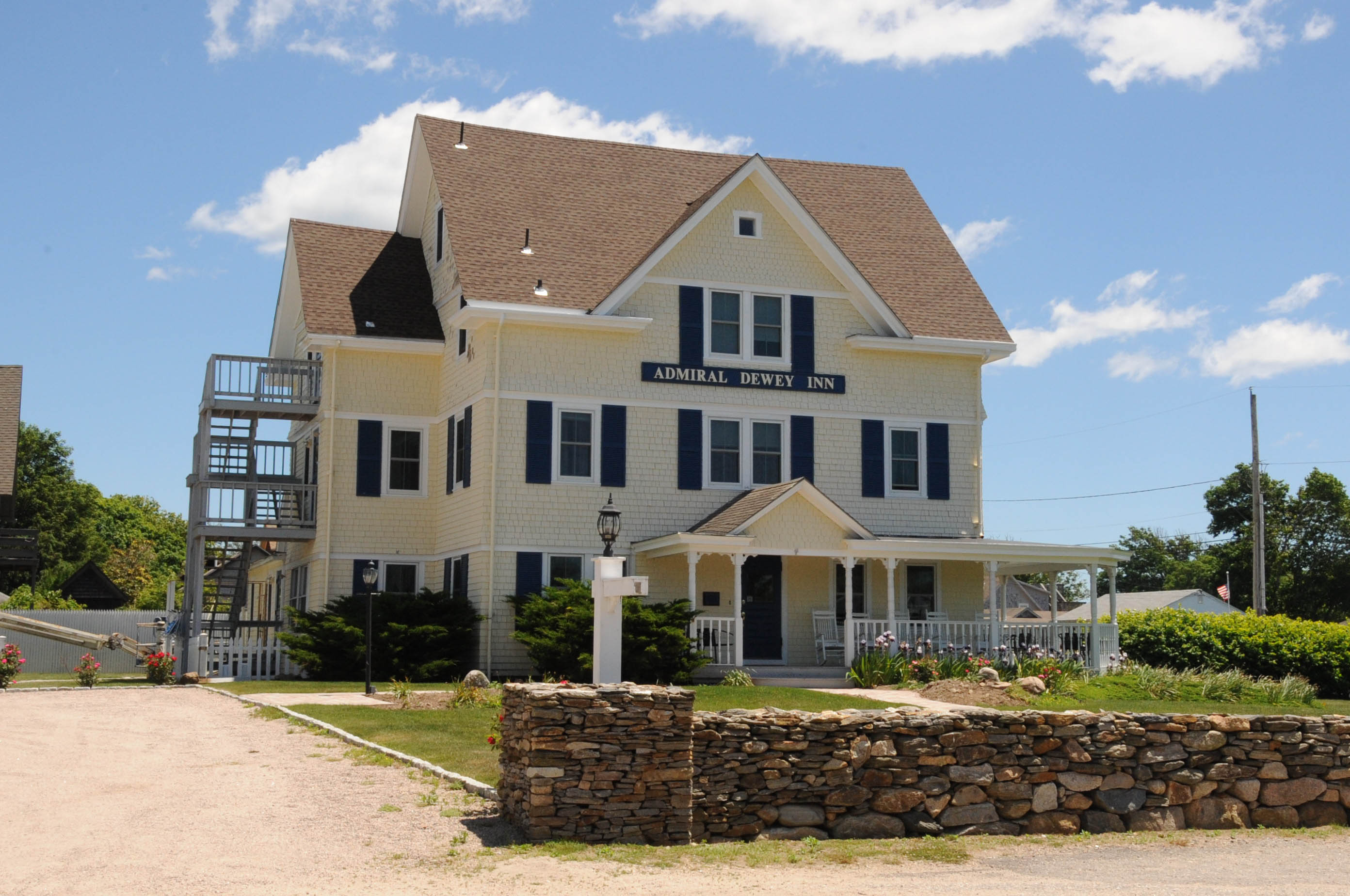

- Location within Rhode Island Location within the United States
- Location: 668 Matunuck Beach Road, South Kingstown, Rhode Island
- Coordinates: 41°22′42″N 71°32′56″W
- Built: 1898
- Architectural style: Late Victorian
- NRHP reference No.: 92000467
- Added to NRHP: May 7, 1992

Dewey Cottage is a historic house in South Kingstown, Rhode Island.

The cottage, now operated as the Admiral Dewey Inn, was built in 1898 in a late-Victorian style and added to the National Register of Historic Places in 1992.

== History ==
The cottage was named after Commodore George Dewey who in "May of 1898 in Manila, the Philippines...surprised the Spanish Pacific fleet...and destroyed it without suffering a single casualty. The Commodore became an Admiral and hero of the nation. Dewey had been Commander of the Naval War College in Newport, and Rhode Island felt especially proud."

Accordingly, "[t]hat same month in Matunuck, Rhode Island, George Irving Champlin and his wife Etta Jane (Tucker) opened their beachfront boardinghouse and named it "The Dewey Cottage" in honor of our hero."

Nearly a century later, "[i]n 1988...new owner—Joan LeBel—reopened the fully restored Admiral Dewey Inn. Its rich heritage has established it as a member of the National Historic Register and one of the few remaining Southern New England beach hotels. In 1998 the B&B is celebrated its Centennial, including a display of 100 pink flamingos on the lawn of the Inn."

== See also ==
- National Register of Historic Places listings in Washington County, Rhode Island
