= North End Historic District (Westerly, Rhode Island) =

Historic district in Rhode Island, United States

- U.S. National Register of Historic Places
- U.S. Historic district
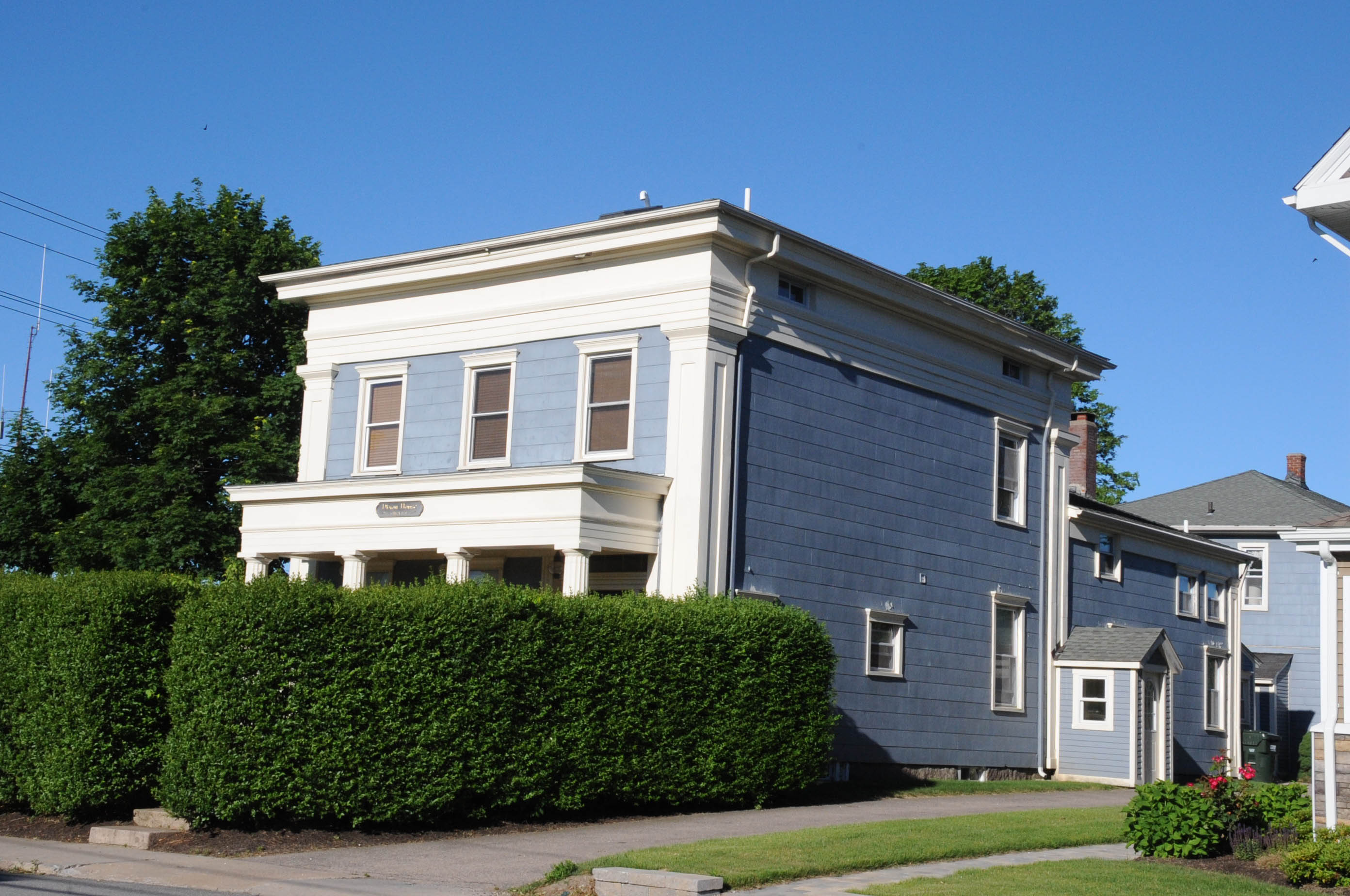
- Nathan P. Dixon House

- Location within Rhode Island Location within the United States
- Location: Westerly, Rhode Island
- Coordinates: 41°23′16″N 71°49′38″W
- Area: 150 acres (0.61 km^{2})
- Architect: Multiple
- MPS: Westerly MRA
- NRHP reference No.: 06000298
- Added to NRHP: April 20, 2006

The North End Historic District is a predominantly residential historic district in northwestern Westerly, Rhode Island. The area traces the industrial development of Westerly, with proximity to both its central business district as well as water-based textile mills, and stone quarries further inland. Most of the district's architecture was built between 1832 and 1955. The district is bounded on the east by High Street; on the south by properties on Friendship, West, Pleasant Streets, Marriott Avenue and Industrial Drive; on the west by properties on Pleasant, Canal, Pierce and Pond Streets; and on the north by properties on Pond, Pierce, Pearl, and High Streets, and Turano Avenue.

The district was added to the National Register of Historic Places on April 20, 2006.

== See also ==
- National Register of Historic Places listings in Washington County, Rhode Island
- Westerly Downtown Historic District
