= National Register of Historic Places listings in Washington County, Rhode Island =

Location of Washington County in Rhode Island

This is a list of the National Register of Historic Places listings in Washington County, Rhode Island.

This is intended to be a complete list of the properties and districts on the National Register of Historic Places in Washington County, Rhode Island, United States. Latitude and longitude coordinates are provided for many National Register properties and districts; these locations may be seen together in a map.

There are 134 properties and districts listed on the National Register in the county, including 4 National Historic Landmarks.

Contents: Counties in Rhode Island

Bristol | Kent | Newport | Providence (Pawtucket | Providence (city) | Woonsocket) | Washington

This National Park Service list is complete through NPS recent listings posted May 1, 2026.

This National Park Service list is complete through NPS recent listings posted May 1, 2026.

== Current listings ==
	Name on the Register	Image	Date listed	Location	City or town	Description
1	Allen-Madison House	Allen-Madison House	March 28, 1980 (#80000015)	Post Rd. 41°37′06″N 71°25′16″W	North Kingstown	
2	Anthony-Kinney Farm	Anthony-Kinney Farm	April 17, 2013 (#13000178)	505 Point Judith Road; 41°24′26″N 71°28′44″W	Narragansett	
3	Austin Farm Road Agricultural Area	Austin Farm Road Agricultural Area	August 16, 1977 (#77000009)	6 mi (9.7 km) west of Exeter off Interstate 95; 41°35′44″N 71°39′52″W	Exeter	
4	Babcock House	Babcock House	January 1, 1976 (#76000008)	Main St. 41°20′14″N 71°42′43″W	Charlestown	
5	Babcock-Smith House	Babcock-Smith House	July 24, 1972 (#72000008)	124 Granite St. 41°22′16″N 71°49′13″W	Westerly	
6	David S. Baker Estate	David S. Baker Estate	August 4, 2011 (#11000512)	51 & 67 Prospect Ave. 41°33′54″N 71°27′11″W	North Kingstown	
7	Baptist Church in Exeter	Baptist Church in Exeter	November 21, 1978 (#78000014)	North of Arcadia on RI 165; 41°34′36″N 71°42′36″W	Exeter	
8	Beaver River Road Historic District		October 25, 2021 (#100006693)	Beaver River Rd., Beaver River Schoolhouse Rd. 41°28′45″N 71°37′35″W	Richmond	
9	Black Farm		November 7, 1995 (#95001268)	Bounded by the Rockville-Alton Rd. (RI 112) and the Wood River; 41°28′06″N 71°43′23″W	Hopkinton	
10	Block Island North Light	Block Island North Light	May 23, 1974 (#74000008)	Sandy Point, off the northern end of Corn Neck Rd. 41°13′39″N 71°34′34″W	New Shoreham	Built in 1867; still in use with its original lens.
11	Block Island Southeast Light	Block Island Southeast Light	September 25, 1997 (#97001264)	South East Light Rd. 41°09′11″N 71°32′53″W	New Shoreham	Built in 1874; best surviving example of late 19th-century U.S. lighthouse construction. Still in use.
12	Bouchard Archeological Site, RI-1025		November 1, 1984 (#84000370)	Address Restricted	South Kingstown	Listed in Usquepaug.
13	Bradford Village Historic District	Bradford Village Historic District	May 30, 1996 (#96000573)	Roughly Bowling Ln. from the Pawcatuck River to Vars Ln. and Main St. from the Bradford Bridge to Church Ave. 41°24′08″N 71°45′06″W	Hopkinton and Westerly	
14	Browning's Beach Historic District	Browning's Beach Historic District	September 5, 1997 (#97000952)	Browning's Beach, 0.5 mi (0.80 km) west of the junction of Card Pond and Matunuck Beach Rds. 41°22′26″N 71°33′52″W	South Kingstown	
15	Jireh Bull Blockhouse	Jireh Bull Blockhouse	November 3, 1983 (#83003869)	Address Restricted	South Kingstown	
16	Camp Endicott	Camp Endicott	October 19, 1978 (#78000015)	Between 7th and 10th Sts. 41°36′10″N 71°25′59″W	North Kingstown	Mostly demolished; some Quonset huts survive at the Seabee Museum and Memorial Park
17	Carolina Village Historic District	Carolina Village Historic District	May 2, 1974 (#74000009)	Charlestown; 41°27′31″N 71°39′51″W	Charlestown and Richmond	
18	Silas Casey Farm	Silas Casey Farm	August 14, 1973 (#73000006)	Boston Neck Rd. 41°30′40″N 71°26′01″W	North Kingstown	
19	Cedar Point Historic District		July 21, 2022 (#100007946)	13, 21, 26, 31, and 49 Loop Dr. 41°33′56″N 71°27′24″W	North Kingstown	
20	Central Street Historic District	Central Street Historic District	August 18, 1982 (#82000015)	Both sides of Central Street from 5th Ave. to Boon St. 41°25′46″N 71°27′44″W	Narragansett	
21	Peleg Champlin House		June 1, 1982 (#82000016)	Rodman Pond Lane; 41°11′24″N 71°35′38″W	New Shoreham	
22	Samuel Clarke Farm	Samuel Clarke Farm	February 4, 2019 (#100003413)	106 Lewiston Ave. 41°27′39″N 71°37′26″W	Richmond	
23	Cocumscossoc Archeological Site	Cocumscossoc Archeological Site	April 12, 1993 (#93000605)	55 Richard Smith Drive; 41°35′00″N 71°27′16″W	North Kingstown	Area around one of the state's oldest houses has yielded considerable information from digs
24	Cottrell House	Cottrell House	November 21, 1996 (#96001319)	500 Waites Corner Rd. 41°29′22″N 71°33′55″W	South Kingstown	
25	Crowfield Historic District	Crowfield Historic District	July 19, 1985 (#85001646)	Boston Neck Rd. 41°32′00″N 71°25′27″W	North Kingstown	
26	Davisville Historic District	Davisville Historic District	July 19, 1985 (#85001645)	Davisville Rd. 41°37′17″N 71°28′52″W	North Kingstown	
27	Devil's Foot Cemetery Archeological Site, RI-694	Devil's Foot Cemetery Archeological Site, RI-694	November 15, 1984 (#84000562)	Address Restricted	North Kingstown	
28	Dewey Cottage	Dewey Cottage	May 7, 1992 (#92000467)	668 Matunuck Beach Rd. 41°22′42″N 71°32′56″W	South Kingstown	
29	District Schoolhouse No. 2	District Schoolhouse No. 2	January 4, 1980 (#80000016)	Old Post Rd. 41°23′07″N 71°39′04″W	Charlestown	
30	George Douglas House	George Douglas House	October 10, 1975 (#75000006)	South of Allenton at Tower Hill and Gilbert Stuart Rds. 41°31′18″N 71°27′46″W	North Kingstown	
31	Druidsdream	Druidsdream	July 20, 1989 (#89000940)	144 Gibson Ave. 41°25′02″N 71°27′46″W	Narragansett	
32	The Dunes Club	The Dunes Club	May 18, 2015 (#15000243)	137 Boston Neck Rd. 41°26′23″N 71°26′56″W	Narragansett	
33	Dunmere	Dunmere	September 23, 2005 (#05001061)	560 Ocean Rd. 41°24′16″N 71°27′44″W	Narragansett	
34	Earlscourt Historic District	Earlscourt Historic District	August 18, 1982 (#82000017)	Roughly bounded by Westmoreland, Noble, Woodward Sts., and Gibson Ave.(both sides); 41°25′15″N 71°27′42″W	Narragansett	
35	Henry Eldred Farm	Henry Eldred Farm	November 18, 1991 (#91001646)	368 Old North Rd. 41°29′55″N 71°31′14″W	South Kingstown	
36	George Fayerweather Blacksmith Shop	George Fayerweather Blacksmith Shop	November 29, 1984 (#84000470)	Intersection RI 108 and 138; 41°28′49″N 71°31′13″W	South Kingstown	
37	Fernwood Archeological Site, RI-702		September 12, 1985 (#85002364)	Address Restricted	South Kingstown	
38	Fisherville Historic and Archeological District	Fisherville Historic and Archeological District	December 5, 1980 (#80000017)	Address Restricted	Exeter	
39	Flying Horse Carousel	Flying Horse Carousel	January 11, 1980 (#80000019)	Bay St. 41°18′32″N 71°51′31″W	Westerly	One of the earliest carousels still in use, dating to 1876. Horses are suspended from chains rather than on poles, hence the name.
40	Former Immaculate Conception Church	Former Immaculate Conception Church	April 24, 1973 (#73000007)	119 High St. 41°22′55″N 71°49′32″W	Westerly	
41	Fort Ninigret	Fort Ninigret	April 28, 1970 (#70000004)	Fort Neck Rd. 41°22′52″N 71°38′54″W	Charlestown	
42	Foster Cove Archeological Site	Foster Cove Archeological Site	May 6, 1980 (#80000018)	Address Restricted	Charlestown	
43	Gardencourt	Gardencourt	August 18, 1982 (#82000018)	10 Gibson Ave. 41°25′21″N 71°27′39″W	Narragansett	
44	Ezekial Gardner House	Ezekial Gardner House	July 19, 1985 (#85001654)	297 Pendar Rd. 41°31′47″N 71°28′35″W	North Kingstown	
45	R. R. Gardner House	R. R. Gardner House	November 21, 1996 (#96001320)	700 Curtis Corner Rd. 41°27′10″N 71°31′54″W	South Kingstown	
46	Gladstone Springhouse and Bottling Plant	Gladstone Springhouse and Bottling Plant	May 10, 1984 (#84002051)	145A Boon St. 41°25′35″N 71°27′25″W	Narragansett	
47	Great Salt Pond Archeological District		February 15, 1990 (#90000107)	Address Restricted	New Shoreham	
48	Greene Inn	Greene Inn	June 24, 1976 (#76000009)	175 Ocean Rd. 41°25′23″N 71°27′23″W	Narragansett	Burned down in 1980.
49	Hale House	Hale House	June 5, 2007 (#07000527)	2625A Commodore Oliver Hazard Perry Highway; 41°23′52″N 71°33′03″W	South Kingstown	
50	Hallville Historic and Archeological District	Hallville Historic and Archeological District	December 5, 1980 (#80000020)	Address Restricted	Exeter	
51	Hamilton Mill Village Historic District	Hamilton Mill Village Historic District	November 3, 1983 (#83003874)	Boston Neck and Martha Rds., Salisbury and Web Aves. 41°32′56″N 71°26′19″W	North Kingstown	
52	Hillsdale Historic and Archeological District	Hillsdale Historic and Archeological District	November 24, 1980 (#80000021)	Address Restricted	Richmond	
53	Historic Village of the Narragansetts in Charlestown	Historic Village of the Narragansetts in Charlestown	May 7, 1973 (#73000008)	Bounded by Route 112, U.S. Route 1, King's Factory Road (Bureau of Indian Affairs Route 411), and Route 91; 41°24′37″N 71°40′03″W	Charlestown	
54	Hope Valley Historic District	Hope Valley Historic District	July 3, 2004 (#04000654)	Main Street; 41°30′28″N 71°43′00″W	Hopkinton	
55	Hopkinton City Historic District	Hopkinton City Historic District	May 1, 1974 (#74000010)	Hopkinton; 41°27′40″N 71°46′39″W	Hopkinton	
56	John Hoxsie House	John Hoxsie House	May 5, 1978 (#78000016)	East of RI 112; 41°28′35″N 71°38′37″W	Richmond	
57	Hygeia House	Hygeia House	October 22, 2001 (#01001156)	Beach Ave. 41°10′40″N 71°34′18″W	New Shoreham	
58	Indian Burial Ground	Indian Burial Ground	April 28, 1970 (#70000005)	Narrow Lane; 41°23′48″N 71°38′00″W	Charlestown	
59	Joseph Jeffrey House	Joseph Jeffrey House	March 8, 1978 (#78000017)	Old Mill Road; 41°25′47″N 71°39′54″W	Charlestown	
60	Kenyon's Department Store	Kenyon's Department Store	November 5, 1992 (#92001540)	344 Main St. 41°26′17″N 71°29′59″W	South Kingstown	
61	Kingston Hill Farm	Kingston Hill Farm	May 7, 1993 (#93000343)	549 Old North Rd. 41°29′41″N 71°30′51″W	South Kingstown	
62	Kingston Railroad Station	Kingston Railroad Station	April 26, 1978 (#78000018)	Kingston Rd. 41°29′03″N 71°33′39″W	South Kingstown	Restored 1875 original station built by Providence and Stonington Railroad; still used today.
63	Kingston Village Historic District	Kingston Village Historic District	May 1, 1974 (#74000011)	South Kingstown; 41°28′48″N 71°31′29″W	South Kingstown	
64	Lafayette Village	Lafayette Village	November 14, 1978 (#78000019)	Ten Rod Road; 41°34′24″N 71°28′59″W	North Kingstown	
65	Lambda Chi Site, RI-704		November 1, 1984 (#84000372)	Address Restricted	South Kingstown	
66	Lawton's Mill	Lawton's Mill	June 27, 1980 (#80000022)	Ten Rod Rd. 41°34′54″N 71°34′13″W	Exeter	
67	Lewis-Card-Perry House	Lewis-Card-Perry House	October 4, 2005 (#05001152)	12 Margin St. 41°22′08″N 71°49′57″W	Westerly	
68	Simon Lillibridge Farm	Simon Lillibridge Farm	November 28, 1978 (#78000020)	Summit Rd. 41°34′16″N 71°42′47″W	Exeter	
69	Main Street Historic District	Main Street Historic District	January 9, 1978 (#78000021)	113-132 Main St., 8, 7-13 School St., 3-14 Maple St. 41°22′25″N 71°49′51″W	Westerly	
70	Henry Marchant Farm	Henry Marchant Farm	August 16, 1979 (#79000009)	S. County Trail; 41°28′52″N 71°35′56″W	South Kingstown	
71	William Davis Miller House	William Davis Miller House	March 21, 1985 (#85000627)	130 Main St. 41°26′08″N 71°30′27″W	South Kingstown	
72	Ministerial Rd. Site, RI-781	Ministerial Rd. Site, RI-781	November 15, 1984 (#84000565)	Address Restricted	South Kingstown	
73	Silas Mumford Site (Tappan Site RI-705)	Silas Mumford Site (Tappan Site RI-705)	November 1, 1984 (#84000382)	Address Restricted	South Kingstown	
74	Narragansett Baptist Church	Narragansett Baptist Church	November 25, 1977 (#77000010)	S. Ferry Rd. 41°29′34″N 71°25′34″W	Narragansett	
75	Narragansett Pier Life Saving Station	Narragansett Pier Life Saving Station	June 30, 1976 (#76000010)	40 Ocean Rd. 41°25′48″N 71°27′20″W	Narragansett	
76	North End Historic District	North End Historic District	April 20, 2006 (#06000298)	Canal, Dayton, Friendship, High, Pearl, Pierce, Pleasant, Pond, West, Industrial Lila, Geranium, Marriott, and Turano; 41°23′16″N 71°49′38″W	Westerly	
77	Stephen Northup House	Stephen Northup House	July 19, 1985 (#85001653)	99 Featherbed Lane; 41°33′05″N 71°26′52″W	North Kingstown	Built by early Providence and Narragansett settler, Stephen Northup
78	Nursery Site, RI-273		November 1, 1984 (#84000386)	Address Restricted	Westerly	
79	Ocean Road Historic District	Ocean Road Historic District	August 18, 1982 (#82000019)	Ocean and Wildfield Farm Rds., and Newton and Hazard Aves. 41°24′45″N 71°27′22″W	Narragansett	
80	Old Harbor Historic District	Old Harbor Historic District	May 8, 1974 (#74000012)	Roughly bounded by the Atlantic Ocean and Main St. (includes Spring and High Sts. and Main St.); 41°10′18″N 71°33′31″W	New Shoreham	
81	Old Narragansett Cemetery	Old Narragansett Cemetery	July 19, 1985 (#85001655)	Shermantown Rd. 41°31′08″N 71°28′42″W	North Kingstown	
82	Old Narragansett Church	Old Narragansett Church	July 2, 1973 (#73000009)	60 Church Lane, Wickford; 41°34′21″N 71°26′59″W	North Kingstown	
83	Palmer-Northrup House	Palmer-Northrup House	April 11, 1973 (#73000010)	7919 Post Rd. 41°34′37″N 71°27′40″W	North Kingstown	
84	Parris Brook Historic and Archeological District	Parris Brook Historic and Archeological District	December 5, 1980 (#80000023)	Address Restricted	Exeter	
85	Peace Dale Historic District	Peace Dale Historic District	October 30, 1987 (#87000493)	Roughly bounded by Kensey Rd., Oakwoods Dr., Kingstown Rd., School, Church and Railroad Sts. 41°27′04″N 71°29′42″W	South Kingstown	
86	Commodore Oliver Perry Farm	Commodore Oliver Perry Farm	August 26, 1982 (#82000020)	Commodore Perry Highway (US Route 1); 41°25′08″N 71°31′51″W	South Kingstown	
87	Perry Homestead Historic District	Perry Homestead Historic District	March 15, 2016 (#16000089)	2, 4, 8, 12, 16 Margin & 15, 17 Beach Sts. 41°22′09″N 71°49′54″W	Westerly	
88	Perry-Carpenter Grist Mill	Perry-Carpenter Grist Mill	February 22, 1990 (#90000106)	364 Moonstone Beach Rd. 41°23′35″N 71°34′34″W	South Kingstown	
89	Joseph Pierce Farm	Joseph Pierce Farm	July 19, 1985 (#85001652)	933 Gilbert Stuart Rd. 41°31′22″N 71°26′42″W	North Kingstown	
90	Plum Beach Lighthouse	Plum Beach Lighthouse	March 30, 1988 (#88000281)	Off Plum Beach, western passage of Narragansett Bay; 41°31′48″N 71°24′20″W	North Kingstown	
91	Point Judith Lighthouse	Point Judith Lighthouse	March 30, 1988 (#88000279)	1470 Ocean Rd. 41°21′39″N 71°28′55″W	Narragansett	
92	Poplar Point Lighthouse	Poplar Point Lighthouse	February 25, 1988 (#87001703)	1 Poplar Ave. 41°34′15″N 71°26′23″W	North Kingstown	
93	Potter Pond Archeological District	Potter Pond Archeological District	December 8, 1987 (#87002102)	Area surrounding Potter Pond; 41°22′55″N 71°32′02″W	South Kingstown	
94	Queen's Fort	Queen's Fort	November 26, 1980 (#80000024)	Stony Lane; 41°35′30″N 71°31′15″W	Exeter	
95	Ram Point		November 24, 2015 (#15000831)	77 Watch Hill Rd. 41°20′16″N 71°49′45″W	Westerly	
96	Rathbun House	Rathbun House	July 19, 1985 (#85001651)	343 Beacon Dr. 41°34′20″N 71°30′20″W	North Kingstown	
97	Red House	Red House	November 21, 1996 (#96001323)	2403 Post Rd. 41°24′02″N 71°34′15″W	South Kingstown	
98	Gen. Isaac Peace Rodman House	Gen. Isaac Peace Rodman House	April 23, 1990 (#90000596)	1789 Kingstown Rd. 41°27′48″N 71°30′33″W	South Kingstown	
99	Benoni Ross House	Benoni Ross House	December 28, 2008 (#08000717)	97 Lafayette Road; 41°34′24″N 71°29′24″W	North Kingstown	
100	St. Paul's Church	St. Paul's Church	June 30, 1972 (#72000009)	76 Main St. 41°34′17″N 71°27′01″W	North Kingstown	
101	Esbon Sanford House	Esbon Sanford House	July 19, 1985 (#85001649)	88 Featherbed Lane; 41°33′04″N 71°26′55″W	North Kingstown	
102	Saunderstown Historic District	Saunderstown Historic District	July 19, 1985 (#85001647)	Roughly bounded by Stillman, Waterway, Willet, Boston Neck & Ferry Rds. 41°30′28″N 71°25′21″W	North Kingstown	
103	Scrabbletown Historic and Archeological District	Scrabbletown Historic and Archeological District	April 11, 1985 (#85000790)	Address Restricted	North Kingstown	
104	Shadow Farm	Shadow Farm	February 7, 1986 (#86000785)	Kingstown Rd. 41°26′15″N 71°29′28″W	South Kingstown	
105	Shady Lea Historic District	Shady Lea Historic District	July 19, 1985 (#85001644)	Shady Lea and Tower Hill Rds. 41°32′07″N 71°27′56″W	North Kingstown	
106	Shannock Historic District	Shannock Historic District	August 4, 1983 (#83000005)	Main St., N. Shannock and W. Shannock Rds. 41°26′53″N 71°38′28″W	Charlestown and Richmond	
107	Sheffield House	Sheffield House	January 1, 1976 (#76000011)	Beach Rd. 41°20′09″N 71°42′32″W	Charlestown	
108	Six Principle Baptist Church	Six Principle Baptist Church	November 21, 1978 (#78000022)	85 Old Baptist Rd. 41°35′34″N 71°29′29″W	North Kingstown	
109	Joseph Slocum House	Joseph Slocum House	July 19, 1985 (#85001648)	Slocum Rd. 41°31′35″N 71°31′04″W	North Kingstown	
110	Sodom Mill Historic and Archeological District		November 24, 1980 (#80000025)	Address Restricted	Exeter	
111	Spink Farm	Spink Farm	July 19, 1985 (#85001650)	1325 Shermantown Rd. 41°30′34″N 71°29′50″W	North Kingstown	
112	Joseph Stanton House	Joseph Stanton House	January 11, 1980 (#80000026)	U.S. Route 1; 41°21′25″N 71°42′17″W	Charlestown	
113	Gilbert Stuart Birthplace	Gilbert Stuart Birthplace	October 15, 1966 (#66000004)	Gilbert Stuart Rd. 41°31′36″N 71°26′44″W	North Kingstown	Birthplace of Gilbert Stuart, portraitist of George Washington and other Revolutionary figures. Preserved intact.
114	Theatre-By-the-Sea	Theatre-By-the-Sea	July 10, 1980 (#80004597)	Card Ponds Rd. 41°22′37″N 71°33′46″W	South Kingstown	
115	Tomaquag Rock Shelters	Tomaquag Rock Shelters	August 12, 1977 (#77000011)	Maxson Hill Rd. 41°26′19″N 71°46′32″W	Hopkinton	
116	Tootell House	Tootell House	May 26, 2000 (#00000552)	1747 Mooresfield Rd. 41°28′51″N 71°31′02″W	South Kingstown	
117	Towers Historic District	Towers Historic District	August 18, 1982 (#82000021)	Bounded by the Atlantic Ocean, Exchange Pl., and Mathewson and Taylor Sts. 41°25′48″N 71°27′23″W	Narragansett	
118	The Towers	The Towers	November 25, 1969 (#69000001)	Ocean Rd. 41°25′50″N 71°27′22″W	Narragansett	
119	Upper Rockville Mill	Upper Rockville Mill	July 5, 2006 (#06000552)	332 Canonchet Rd. 41°31′20″N 71°45′36″W	Hopkinton	
120	US Post Office	US Post Office	August 12, 1971 (#71000004)	5 High St. 41°22′40″N 71°49′49″W	Westerly	
121	US Weather Bureau Station	US Weather Bureau Station	August 4, 1983 (#83000006)	Beach Avenue; 41°10′35″N 71°34′09″W	New Shoreham	
122	University of Rhode Island Historic District	University of Rhode Island Historic District	November 9, 2017 (#100001745)	Campus & E. Alumni Aves., Farmhouse, Greenhouse, Lippitt, Lower College, Ranger & Upper College Rds. 41°29′10″N 71°31′38″W	South Kingstown	
123	Usquepaug Road Historic District	Usquepaug Road Historic District	October 30, 1987 (#87001298)	Usquepaug Rd. 41°30′14″N 71°36′01″W	South Kingstown	
124	Wakefield Historic District	Wakefield Historic District	May 30, 1996 (#96000572)	Roughly, Main St. from Belmont Ave. to Columbia St.; also Main St., High St., Robinson St., Wright Ave.; also Main, High, and Robinson Sts., Wright Ave. 41°26′15″N 71°30′04″W	South Kingstown	Second set of addresses represents a boundary increase approved December 19, 2019; the third set represents a boundary increase approved August 1, 2022.
125	Washington County Court House	Washington County Court House	November 5, 1992 (#92001542)	3481 Kingstown Rd. 41°29′02″N 71°33′21″W	South Kingstown	former county courthouse, now an arts center
126	Watch Hill Historic District	Watch Hill Historic District	September 5, 1985 (#85001948)	Roughly bounded by Breen, Watch Hill, and E. Hill Rds., Block Island Sound, Little Narragansett Bay, and the Pawtucket River; 41°18′49″N 71°51′23″W	Westerly	Well-preserved Victorian seaside resort area
127	Weekapaug Inn	Weekapaug Inn	January 25, 2007 (#06001305)	25 Spray Rock Rd. 41°19′49″N 71°45′03″W	Westerly	
128	Westerly Armory	Westerly Armory	November 7, 1996 (#96001322)	Railroad Ave., west of downtown Westerly; 41°22′55″N 71°49′40″W	Westerly	
129	Westerly Downtown Historic District	Westerly Downtown Historic District	July 19, 1984 (#84002055)	Railroad Ave., High, Canal, Broad, Union, and Main Sts. 41°22′45″N 71°49′49″W	Westerly	
130	Wickford Historic District	Wickford Historic District	December 31, 1974 (#74000013)	Roughly bounded by Tower Hill and Post Rds. as far N as Mill Cove and S to Lindley Ave; 41°34′12″N 71°27′24″W	North Kingstown	
131	Wilcox Park Historic District	Wilcox Park Historic District	May 7, 1973 (#73000011)	Roughly bounded by Broad, Granite, High Sts. and Grove Ave. and running along Elm St. 41°22′36″N 71°49′43″W	Westerly	
132	Willow Dell	Willow Dell	November 21, 1996 (#96001321)	2700 Commodore Oliver Hazard Perry Highway; 41°23′47″N 71°33′04″W	South Kingstown	
133	Wyoming Village Historic District	Wyoming Village Historic District	May 2, 1974 (#74000014)	Roughly bounded by RI 3, RI 138, Old Nooseneck Hill Rd., Bridge and Prospect Sts. 41°30′57″N 71°42′12″W	Hopkinton and Richmond	
134	YWCA Site		November 20, 1980 (#80000027)	Address Restricted	North Kingstown	

== Former listings ==
	Name on the Register	Image	Date listed	Date removed	Location	City or town	Description
1	Lischio Site, RI-1000		June 7, 1983 (#83003431)	June 28, 1985	Address Restricted	North Kingstown vicinity	
2	Dr. William G. Shaw House		January 13, 1972 (#72001575)	March 14, 1979	41 Brown St.	North Kingstown	Relocated in 1973.

== See also ==
- List of National Historic Landmarks in Rhode Island
- National Register of Historic Places listings in Rhode Island
