= Lewis–Card–Perry House =

Historic house in Rhode Island, United States

- U.S. National Register of Historic Places
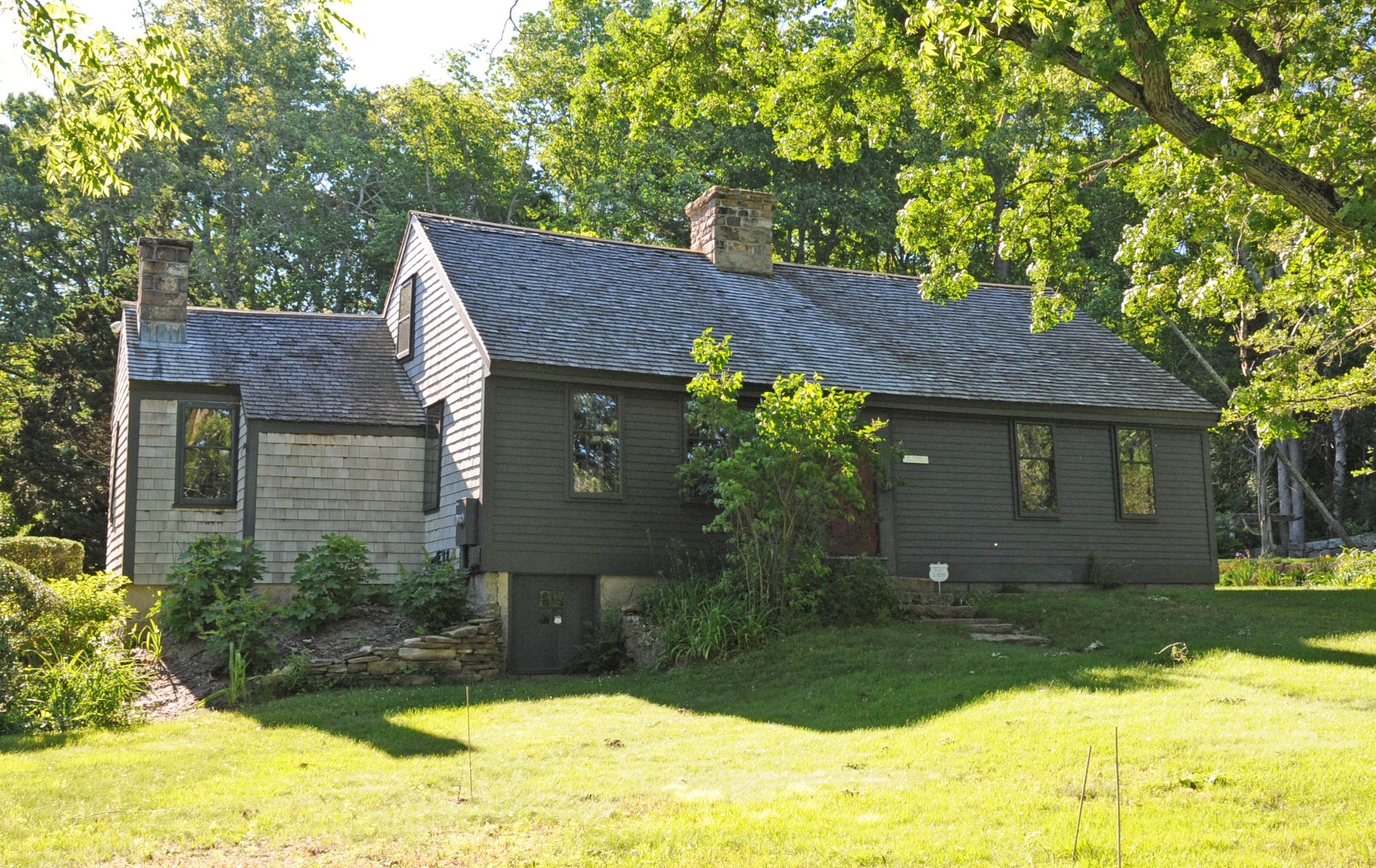

- Location within Rhode Island Location within the United States
- Location: Westerly, Rhode Island
- Coordinates: 41°22′7″N 71°51′25″W
- Built: 1929
- Architect: Isham, Norman M.; Manning, Warren and Arthur Shurcliff
- Architectural style: Colonial Revival
- NRHP reference No.: 05001152
- Added to NRHP: October 4, 2005

The Lewis–Card–Perry House is a historic house at 12 Margin Street in Westerly, Rhode Island.

== Description and history ==
The 1 1/2-story Cape style house was built sometime in the 18th century, possibly as early as 1700. By 1905, the house had deteriorated and a portion was demolished. In 1929, Harvey and Lydia Perry hired the architect and preservationist Norman Isham to restore the remaining structure and reconstruct the original south end. The house is significant as a well-preserved example of a Colonial Revival restoration of a colonial-era house. Some of its present material is original to the 18th-century house, but much of its structure is derived from either new materials, or materials salvaged from other similar properties nearby.

The house was listed on the National Register of Historic Places on October 4, 2005.

== See also ==
- National Register of Historic Places listings in Washington County, Rhode Island
