= General Babcock =

General Babcock may refer to:

- John B. Babcock (1843–1909), U.S. Army brigadier general
- Joshua Babcock (1707–1783), Rhode Island State Militia major general in the American Revolutionary War
- Orville E. Babcock (1835–1884), Union Army brevet brigadier general
