= Misquamicut State Beach =

State beach in Washington County, Rhode Island

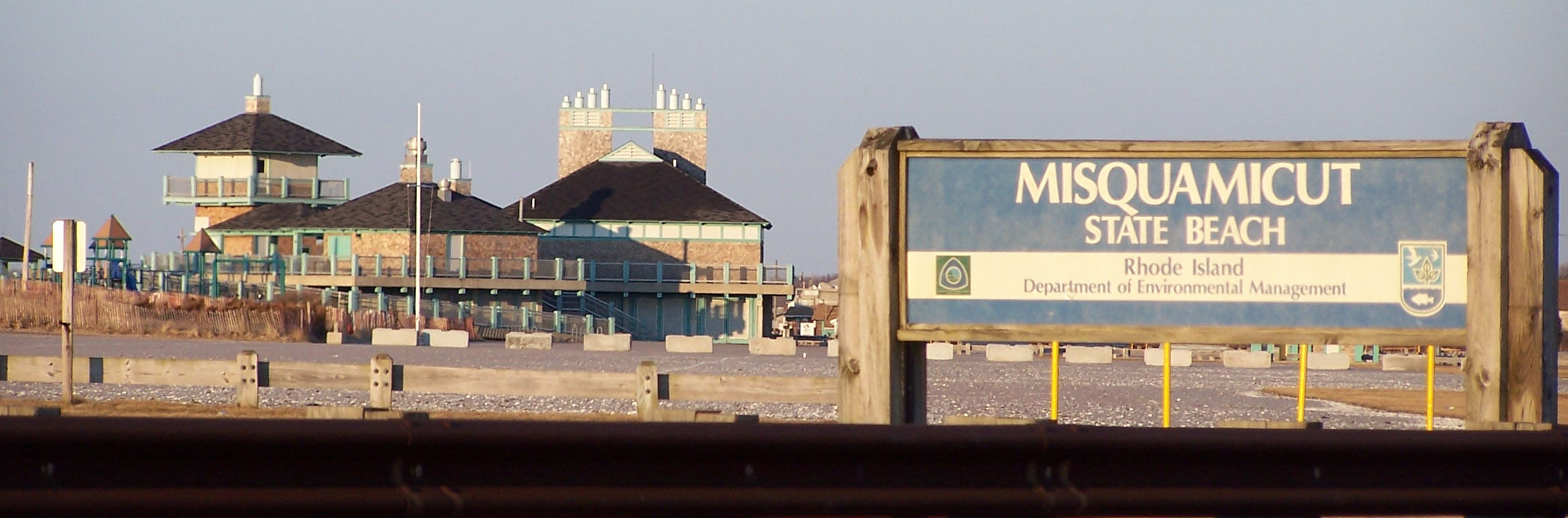
- The pavilion at Misquamicut State Beach

- Location within Rhode Island
- Interactive map of Misquamicut State Beach
- Location: Westerly, Rhode Island, United States
- Coordinates: 41°19′23″N 71°48′17″W
- Area: 51.35 acres (20.78 ha)
- Elevation: 7 ft (2.1 m)
- Established: 1959
- Administrator: Rhode Island Department of Environmental Management, Division of Parks & Recreation
- Website: Official website
- Rhode Island State Parks

Misquamicut State Beach (MISS-kwahm-eh-kut) is a seaside public recreation area in the town of Westerly, Rhode Island. It occupies a portion of Misquamicut Beach, a 3-mile-long (4.8 km) barrier island that extends westward from Weekapaug to Watch Hill and separates Winnapaug Pond from the Atlantic Ocean. The state beach covers 51 acres (21 ha) and is 2 miles long. The main beach has a large with multiple public facilities and snack bar.

Misquamicut State Beach is one of the most popular beaches along the Rhode Island coast and is used extensively by people in the region.

== History ==
A series of hurricanes in 1938, 1944, and 1954 did heavy damage to the Misquamicut beach community. As a result, Governor Dennis J. Roberts instigated condemnation proceedings that culminated in the creation of Misquamicut State Beach in 1959. The beach's 40-year old septic system failed in 1992, at which time waterless composting toilets were introduced which allowed the park to stay in operation. A beach pavilion was added to the site in 1999 at a cost of $1.5 million, named for Westerly native State Senator James J. Federico, Jr. (1946-1997). The project was completed with the addition of a 2,700-space paved parking area in 2000. Hurricane Sandy blew much of the beach into the parking area in 2012; the state moved some 30,000 cubic yards of sand back onto the shoreline, and the U.S. Army Corps of Engineers completed the beach replenishment project in 2015, using an inland sand source.

== Activities and amenities ==
The James J. Federico, Jr. State Beach Pavilion includes a bathhouse building with composting toilets, a concession building with gift shop and offices, a lifeguard tower, and shade gazebos. The Misquamicut Business Association sponsors various events throughout the year at the state beach and other locations. The beach is open seasonally.
