= Maschaug Pond =

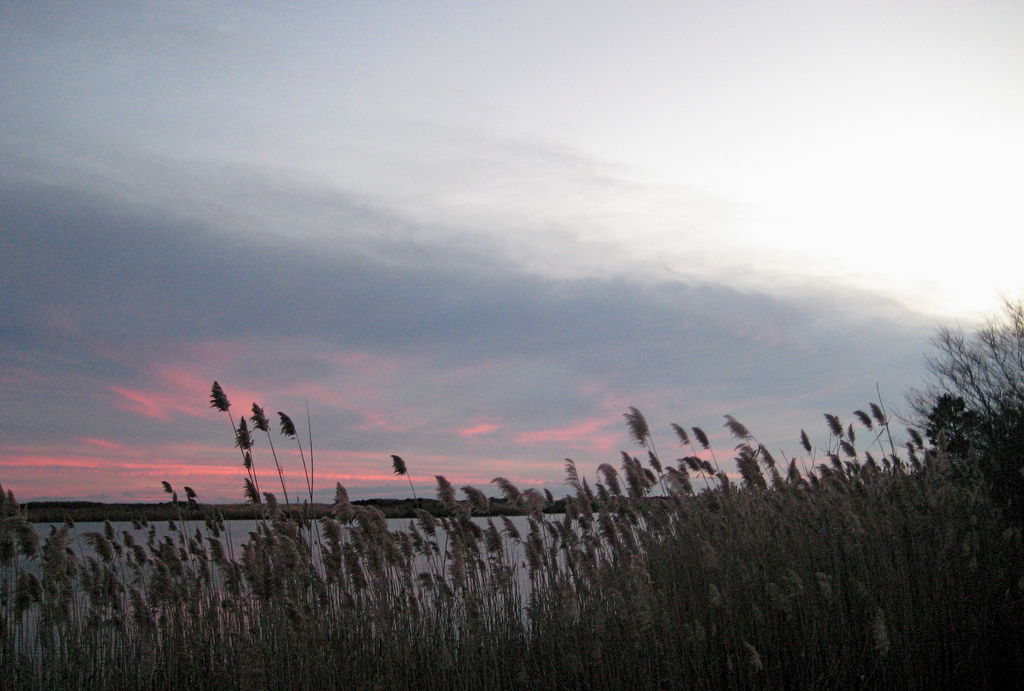
- seen from the Ocean View Highway

- Location within Rhode Island
- Location: Westerly, Washington County, Rhode Island
- Group: Salt Ponds of Rhode Island
- Coordinates: 41°19′07″N 71°49′51″W
- Type: coastal lagoon, brackish
- Primary inflows: precipitation, groundwater
- Catchment area: 392.57 acres (158.87 ha)
- Basin countries: United States
- Surface area: 34.63 acres (14.01 ha)
- Average depth: 6.89 ft (2.10 m)

Maschaug Pond is a coastal lagoon in Westerly, Washington County, Rhode Island, United States. Located at 41°19′07″N 71°49′51″W, it is one of nine such lagoons (often referred to as "salt ponds") in southern Rhode Island. A "small, brackish pond", it is not permanently connected to the Block Island Sound, and is largely bordered by the Misquamicut Club golf course. Nests of the piping plover, which has been federally designated as a threatened species, have been documented within the watershed.

Its watershed covers 392.57 acres (158.87 ha); 52.08 acres (21.08 ha) is occupied by water. Maschaug itself has a surface area of 34.63 acres (14.01 ha), while nearby Little Maschaug Pond is 11.69 acres (4.73 ha). The pond averages 6.89 ft (2.10 m) deep, and has a salinity level of approximately 7 parts per thousand, too low to sustain the growth of eelgrass. The pond is non-tidal, except when breached by storms. The water directly receives about 57,219,222 gallons of precipitation per year, though groundwater flow is unknown. No rivers or streams flow into the pond. Maschaug Pond, like others in the region, was "formed after the recession of the glaciers 12,000 years ago".

As a result of certain environmental conditions, including low elevation of surrounding land and dense residential and commercial development, Maschaug Pond is considered particularly susceptible to storm surge. It is projected that during a future hurricane, Winnapaug and Maschaug Ponds will likely be significantly changed.

== See also ==
- List of lakes in Rhode Island
- Geography of Rhode Island
