= Westerly, Rhode Island =

Town in Rhode Island

Westerly
- Town
- Town of Westerly
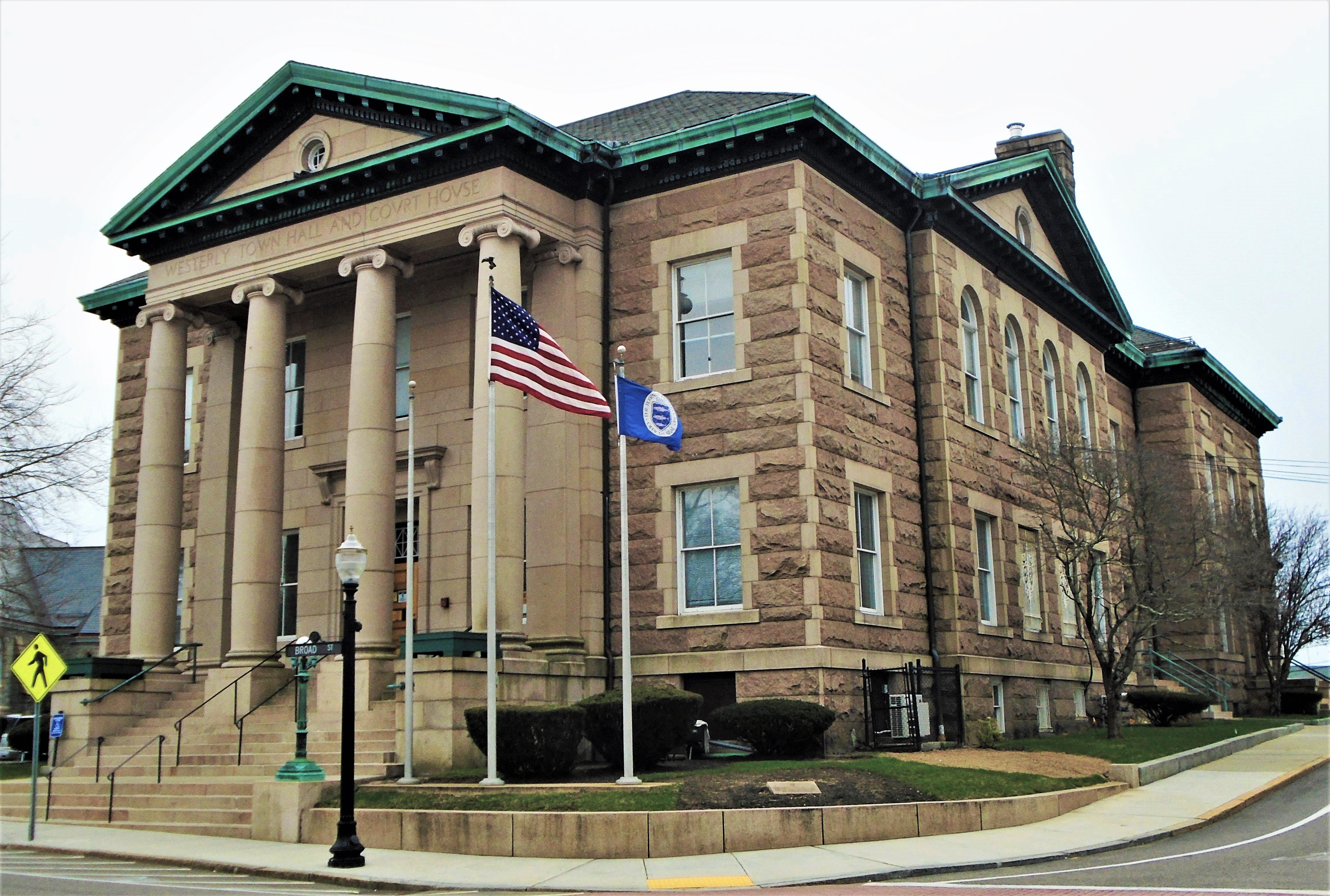
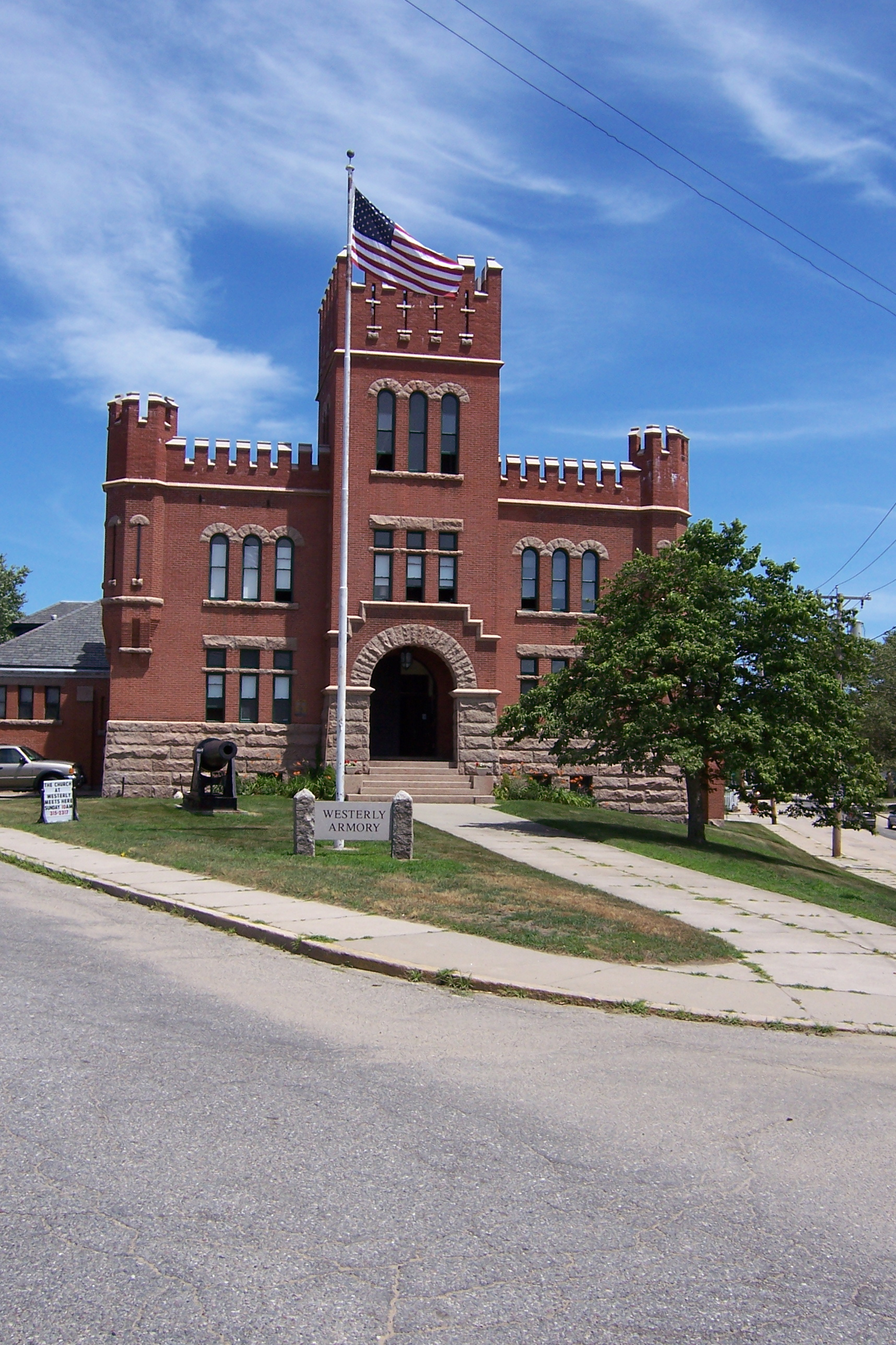
- Aerial view of Westerly The Westerly Town Hall and Court House (2021) The Westerly Armory (2005)

- Flag Seal Logo

- Location of Westerly in Rhode Island Location in the United States Location in North America
- Coordinates: 41°22′39″N 71°49′38″W
- Country: United States
- State: Rhode Island
- County: Washington
- First settled: 1661
- Incorporated: May 13, 1669
- Villages: List: Watch Hill; Bradford; Misquamicut; White Rock Shelter Harbor; Weekapaug; Dunn’s Corners; Mastuxet; Avondale; Downtown Westerly; Winnapaug

Government
  - Type: Mayor–council government
  - President: Christopher A. Duhamel (D)
  - Vice-President: Mary E. Scialabba (D)
  - Town Manager: Shawn M. Lacey
  - Town Clerk: Mary L. LeBlanc
  - Town Solicitor: William J. Conley

Area
  - Total: 74.8 sq mi (194 km^{2})
  - Land: 30.1 sq mi (78 km^{2})
  - Water: 44.7 sq mi (116 km^{2})
- Elevation: 36 ft (11 m)

Population (2024)
  - Total: 23,154
  - Density: 777/sq mi (300/km^{2})
- Time zone: UTC−5 (EST)
  - Summer (DST): UTC−4 (EDT)
- ZIP Codes: 02891; 02808 (Bradford)
- Area code: 401
- FIPS code: 44-77000
- GNIS feature ID: 1220091
- Website: westerlyri.gov

Westerly is a town on the southwestern coastline of Washington County, Rhode Island, first settled by English colonists in 1661, and incorporated as a municipality in 1669. The Town of Westerly is a beachfront community on the south shore of the state with a population of 23,359 as of the 2020 census. The western and northern borders of Westerly are defined by a natural border of the Pawcatuck River, with the bordering town of Hopkinton defined by the Pawcatuck River, while holding a straight border to the east with Charlestown.

The Pawcatuck River flows on the western border of Westerly, and was once renowned for its own species of Westerly salmon, three of which are displayed on the town's official seal. The Pawcatuck River flows from 15 mi (24 km) inland, emptying into Little Narragansett Bay. It also serves as the boundary between Westerly and Pawcatuck, Connecticut. Three large salt ponds lie along the coast, with sand bars of white sand such as the Misquamicut State Beach. From west to east, these ponds are Maschaug Pond, Winnapaug Pond, and Quonochontaug Pond. The Town of Westerly was known historically for local important granite mining and stone-cutting industry, which ran until the quarries stopped operating in the 1950s.

Westerly is a notable tourist destination from May through October, when the population nearly doubles. Its well-known beaches include Weekapaug Beach, Westerly Town Beach, Misquamicut State Beach, East Beach, and Watch Hill Beach. Westerly is also a popular surfing spot for those from the region. Due to its south-facing geography, large southerly swells often occur during late summer and fall as tropical storms pass off the East Coast.

== History ==
=== Early History and European settlement ===
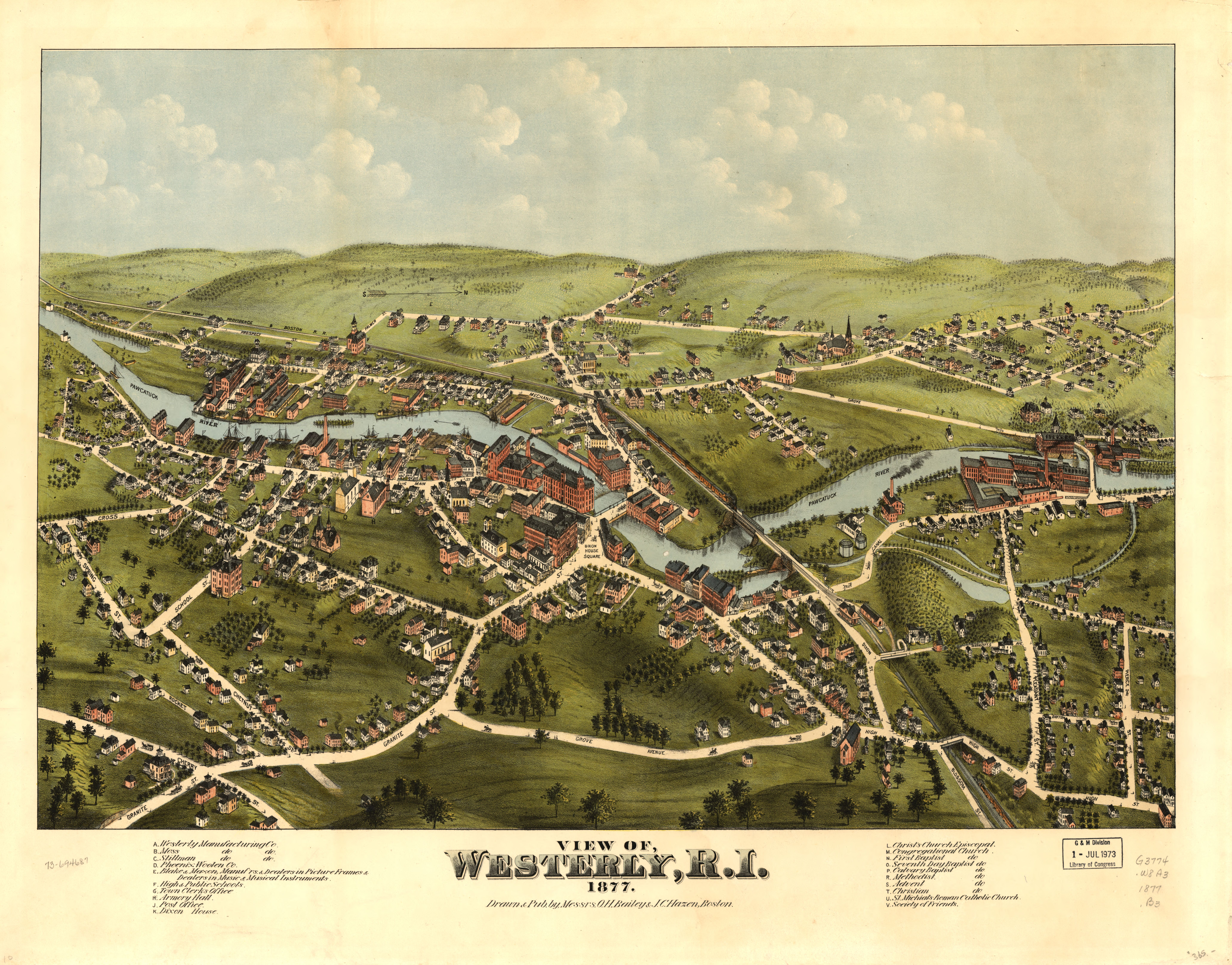
1877 panoramic map of Westerly with list of sights

It is believed that Aboriginal people arrived in Rhode Island 5,000 years ago, based on sites located in what is now Washington County. Westerly would be known as Misquamicut, home to the Narragansett people up until 1637, when the English built an outpost, forcing the Narragansett people out of the region by 1661, allowing for the permanent settlement on the coast line. The English village was the home of Elder John Crandall (c. 1618–1676), one of Westerly's founding fathers. Crandall settled in Westerly in 1661, and the early history of Westerly contains many references to him and his sons.

The Town of Westerly was founded on May 13, 1669, on the eastern shore of Pawcatuck River. There was no defined border between Connecticut and Rhode Island until 1720. It is believed that Westerly was named for the settlement's location respective to Rhode Island's geography, being the westernmost town in the Colony of Rhode Island and Providence Plantations. (Note: There is no proof to where the name Westerly comes from, rather only beliefs.) On May 18, 1669, the newly founded Town of Westerly in the southwest portion of the colony would host its first official town meeting with four elected officers to manage the town, alongside a town clerk.

In 1738, the Town of Charlestown was partitioned off from Westerly, encompassing modern day land of both Charlestown and Richmond, while Hopkinton would remain a part of the Town of Westerly until being partitioned off 19 years later as its own town. Bradford, a village built in 1732, following the partition of Hopkinton, would remain shared between both Hopkinton and Westerly with the Bradford Village Historic District. Slavery had existed in the small town of Westerly by the wealthy.

=== Revolutionary War and Post-revolution ===
Physician, American Revolution general, and Rhode Island Supreme Court justice Dr. Joshua Babcock was born in Westerly. Rhode Island Governor and Chief Justice Samuel Ward also lived here for many years. During the American Revolution, Westerly did not play any major battles compared to the nearby Battle of Newport, which happened in Rhode Island. Lieutenant-Colonel Samuel Ward Jr was a resident of Westerly, Rhode Island, commanding the 1st Rhode Island Regiment in the Battle of Rhode Island in 1778.

Slavery became illegal in the new State of Rhode Island in the 1770s to 1780s, with in 1784, the State of Rhode Island passed the Gradual Emancipation Act, stating: “children born to slave mothers were to be considered freeborn citizens." However, children of former slaves were forced to work as apprentices until the age of 21, and their earning given to their mothers’ owners.

In the early 1800s, prior to the War of 1812, Westerly had become a shipbuilding center under U.S. Navy Officer Oliver Perry, having built Gunboats.

In 1834, the Crumb Quarry, began operations, the first quarry in Westerly, to produce Westerly White and Blue granite.

The Westerly area was known for its historically important (1870-1950s) granite mining and stone-cutting industry, which quarried a unique stone known as Westerly granite. This pinkish granite has been used in buildings in several states on the eastern seaboard. Its quarries produced blue granite, in addition to pinks and reds. The Smith Granite Company employed many granite cutting craftsmen and was one of the town's major employers until the quarries stopped operating in the 1950s. Hundreds of examples of their work can be seen on the battlefields of Gettysburg and in city squares, municipal buildings, cemeteries throughout the United States, and even the Georgia State Capitol.

The four trolley lines of the Groton and Stonington Street Railway, Norwich and Westerly Railway, Pawtucket Valley Street Railway, and the Ashaway and Westerly Railway converged in Westerly and shared track between the railroad station and Dixon House Square downtown. The lines were built in the 1890s and 1900s and ran until the 1920s.

=== 20th Century ===
In 1912, the Westerly Town Hall and Courthouse was built, designed by William Walker & Son in the Academic Revival style, replacing the old town hall. Following the new town halls creation, the district of Pleasant View would be renamed to the Misquamicut in 1928, the original native name of the Westerly region, nearly 260 years after the Town of Westerly was founded. Following the creation of the new town hall, a grass strip would be built by the United States Navy in the 1920s, but would not be activated as an registered airport until the 1930s, when it was registered Westerly State Airport in December 1939 by the Rhode Island Airport Corporation, which would become one of one of six airports managed by the RIAC. The airport continued to serve under the U.S. Navy, allowing for practicing ariel war maneuvers, serving into the 1940s during World War II. On August 2, 1945, a Grumman F6F Hellcat piloted by Ensign Walter G. Davies took off from Runway 32 at the Westerly Auxiliary Naval Air Station, but lost all power and flipped on the runway during emergency landing. The aircraft was deemed a total loss, but there were no injuries or fatalities.

Westerly in 1938 would be struck by the 1938 New England Hurricane, causing severe damage, with the village of Napatree Point being completely destroyed, with buildings being sent into Little Narragansett Bay, and Sandy Point being disconnected from the rest of Napatree to where it remains today. Misquamicut, Galilee, Jerusalem, Green Hill, and Quonochontaug being heavily destroyed, and a storm surge of 12 to 15 ft tall along the coast of Rhode Island. Many factories, mines, houses, and more structures collapsed during the hurricane, and the New Haven and Hartford Railroad was damaged, shutting down transport to Westerly, RI. Following this, Westerly would be struck again six years later in 1944, and again in 1954 by major hurricanes.

In 1966, the Guild Guitar Company, founded in 1952 by Alfred Dronge in New York City, moved production to Westerly, and continued to make their well-respected archtop, acoustic, and solid body guitars there. The Westerly Town Charter, which approved the right to maintain and preserve self-government to the Town of Westerly was approved by the State of Rhode Island and Providence Plantations on November 5, 1968, and become effective July 1, 1969.

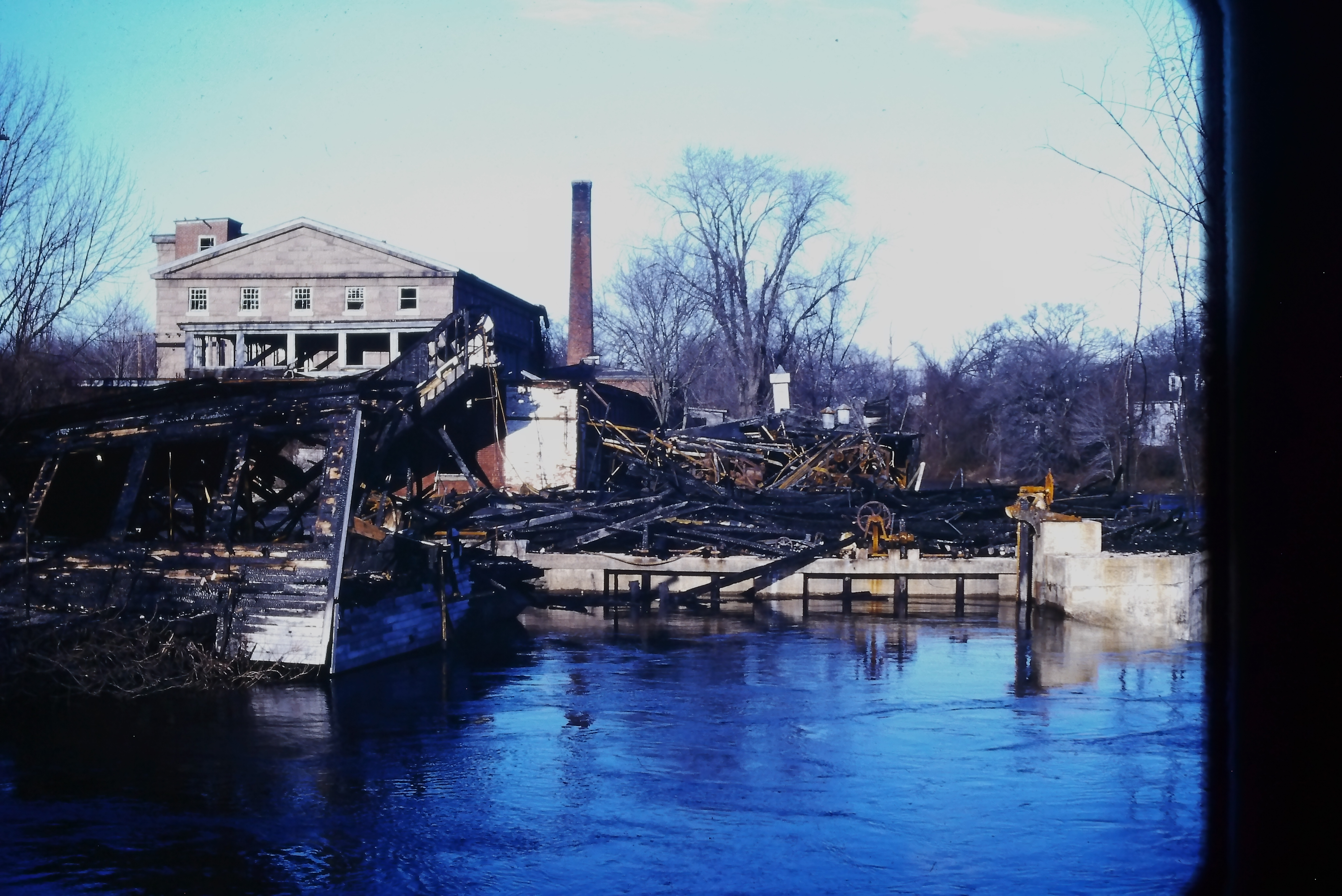
The Potter Hill Mill post-blaze in 1977.

On November 7, 1977, the Potter Hill Mill on the Pawtucket River had caught fire. Built in 1843, Mill had units from Ashaway, Rhode Island being the first to respond, and then Westerly Fire Department arrival. The mill was significantly damaged leading to its collapse, with 75 units on scene, and no injuries reported. Many years following this incident in 2020, the Town of Westerly was given $100,000 in a grant from the NOAA Restoration Center, matched by the Town of Westerly, and other sources, to study fish migration improvements, and flood mitigation improvement, continuing into 2024 with Westerly stating on the town website: "Addressing the dam and the old mill building will eliminate public safety hazards and significantly increase recreation for the community."

=== 21st Century ===
In 2008, fisheries expert Dr. Saul Saila determined that a quarter-century of efforts to establish an Atlantic salmon population were unrealistic because historically the Pawkatuck River had been the run for “Misquamicut”, recognized as an Indian word for red fish, which his accumulated evidence indicates were primarily sea run trout — either salter brook trout or brown trout (Salmo trutta was used to describe anadromous or sea-run forms of brown trout.). If free passage to the sea is re-established, Saila concluded that sea run trout, which would grow quite large, up to 15 pounds, could be established.

In 2012, Hurricane Sandy left beaches along the Westerly shoreline devastated and nearly unrecognizable, including Misquamicut. Rhode Island Governor Lincoln Chafee stated that Misquamicut, a village of Westerly Rhode Island, was the New Jersey of Rhode Island, (Note: Directly stating: "Our New Jersey.") referring to the amount of damage that was received in the State of New Jersey, to the amount of damage received by Misquamicut. The damages caused by Hurricane Sandy caused $11.3 million in damages, with almost 100,000 power outages reported in Rhode Island.

In December 2019, a shooting happened at the Babcock Village, in which three women ended up shot. The police identified the shooter, and two surviving victims. The shooting was done by 66-year old Joseph Giachello, who was found dead in his room after taking the life of 47-year old Julie Cardinal, the manager of the complex.

==== The Covid Pandemic (2020-2023) ====
On March 13 of 2020, the Rhode Island Department of Motor Vehicles would close the Westerly DMV office, deeming the closing until further notice because of complaints that it was disruptive for the employees of the Westerly Town Hall, as the Westerly DMV operated in the Town Hall once a week, however the Westerly Drop Box would remain open for all Rhode Island DMV forms, applications, or canceled plates. 15 days after the closing of the Westerly DMV Office, the Governor of Rhode Island on March 28, 2020, issued the lockdown of the entire State of Rhode Island. The Town of Westerly in response cancelled any town council meetings with only few exceptions, and urged residents to use online and mail services. All schools would initially be ordered to remain closed until April 3, 2020, to set up distance learning for all the students.

In August 2021, Tropical Storm Henri made landfall in Westerly, causing significant damage and power outages. Following Henri's impacts, in November 2021, three tornadoes were confirmed in Rhode Island, the first being an EF-1 tornado which went from Stonington, Connecticut to Westerly. On June 22, 2021, the Westerly Area Youth Lacrosse 14U girls won the Rhode Island Youth Lacrosse League Division 2 title.

On January 4, 2022, the Westerly Public Schools system had reopened to the public with mask policies still in place in place, and extended quarantine times for students and faculty who got sick, while many had chosen to remain home due to the ongoing at the time COVID-19 pandemic still infecting many.

==== Aftermath of the Covid Pandemic ====
In August 2024, the Westerly Public Schools announced the plans to renovate the Spring Brook and Dunn's Corners Elementary Schools, along with the construction of a new State Street Elementary to replace the existing State Street built in 1955, with the new building planned to cover a 48,000 square foot area behind the existing school, and estimated to serve 300 students in grades K–4. Westerly Public Schools plans for the students and staff to transition to the new building in the summer of 2026 following the completion of its construction, after which the existing elementary will be demolished.

Following the covid pandemic, in September 2024, the Rhode Island Department of Environmental Management announced that samples of the West Nile virus had been collected within Westerly and East Providence, found in five of the 114 samples statewide. During the samples, no samples of Eastern equine encephalitis had been detected, with only one case in the entire state.

== Geography ==
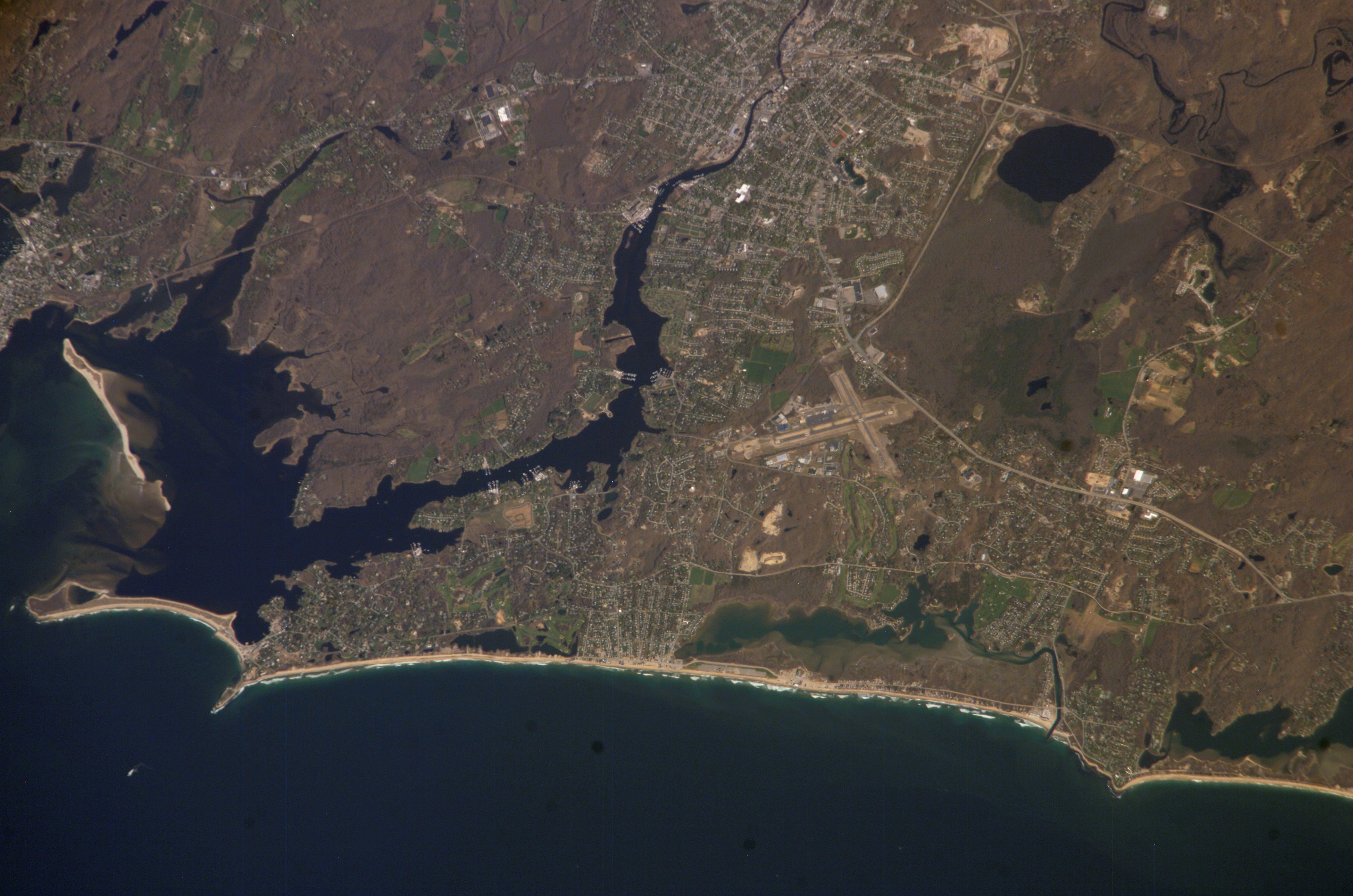
Town of Westerly seen from the International Space Station in 2007.

According to the United States Census Bureau, the town has a total area of 74.8 square miles (194 km^{2}), of which 30.1 square miles (78 km^{2}) is land and 44.7 square miles (116 km^{2}) (59.78%) is water, with Westerly being the 14th biggest town in the State of Rhode Island. The Bureau includes Westerly in the RI-MA Providence metropolitan area defined at the county level, while formerly in the CT-RI Norwich-New London NECTA defined at the municipal level until NECTA was discontinued in 2023.

=== Geology ===
Westerly sits atop a glacial moraine, a series of small hills of debris left behind by receding glaciers in the last Ice Age. A pristine sample of the moraine encompasses a 140-acre (0.57 km^{2}) preserve owned in perpetuity by the Westerly Land Trust. Within the trust land are the rare kettle formations that extend out under the sea to Block Island.

=== Climate ===
Westerly has a humid subtropical climate (Köppen Cfa), defined as having a mean monthly temperature between 0 and 18 °C (32 and 64 °F) in the coldest month and at least 22 °C (72 °F) in the warmest month. Annually, Westerly has a long warm/hot season from April to mid-November, and a cool/cold season from late November through March. Westerly averages 2300 hours of sunshine annually (higher than the USA average), and receives about 1,087 mm (42.8 in) of precipitation annually. In the cold season (December through March), Westerly sees cool weather with occasional cold snaps and wintry weather, which is often brief. Snowcover is normally brief due to the coastal location and marine controlled climate.

Climate data for Westerly, Rhode Island (Westerly State Airport) 1991–2020 normals, extremes 1999–present
Month	Jan	Feb	Mar	Apr	May	Jun	Jul	Aug	Sep	Oct	Nov	Dec	Year
Record high °F (°C)	64 (18)	70 (21)	73 (23)	88 (31)	91 (33)	95 (35)	100 (38)	93 (34)	92 (33)	88 (31)	75 (24)	65 (18)	100 (38)
Mean daily maximum °F (°C)	39.5 (4.2)	41.2 (5.1)	47.2 (8.4)	57.1 (13.9)	66.6 (19.2)	75.0 (23.9)	81.6 (27.6)	80.5 (26.9)	74.4 (23.6)	63.9 (17.7)	54.0 (12.2)	44.9 (7.2)	60.5 (15.8)
Daily mean °F (°C)	32.0 (0.0)	33.4 (0.8)	39.6 (4.2)	48.9 (9.4)	58.3 (14.6)	67.2 (19.6)	73.8 (23.2)	72.4 (22.4)	65.7 (18.7)	55.2 (12.9)	45.9 (7.7)	37.6 (3.1)	52.5 (11.4)
Mean daily minimum °F (°C)	24.5 (−4.2)	25.7 (−3.5)	32.0 (0.0)	40.7 (4.8)	50.0 (10.0)	59.4 (15.2)	65.9 (18.8)	64.3 (17.9)	57.1 (13.9)	46.5 (8.1)	37.8 (3.2)	30.3 (−0.9)	44.5 (6.9)
Record low °F (°C)	−8 (−22)	−10 (−23)	2 (−17)	22 (−6)	29 (−2)	40 (4)	47 (8)	47 (8)	34 (1)	25 (−4)	13 (−11)	4 (−16)	−10 (−23)
Average precipitation inches (mm)	3.34 (85)	2.75 (70)	4.17 (106)	3.90 (99)	3.32 (84)	3.55 (90)	2.91 (74)	3.49 (89)	3.81 (97)	4.29 (109)	3.50 (89)	3.77 (96)	42.80 (1,087)
Average precipitation days (≥ 0.01 in)	10.6	9.1	9.6	11.3	11.8	11.0	9.3	9.4	9.5	10.9	9.5	11.2	123.2
Source: NOAA

=== Villages ===
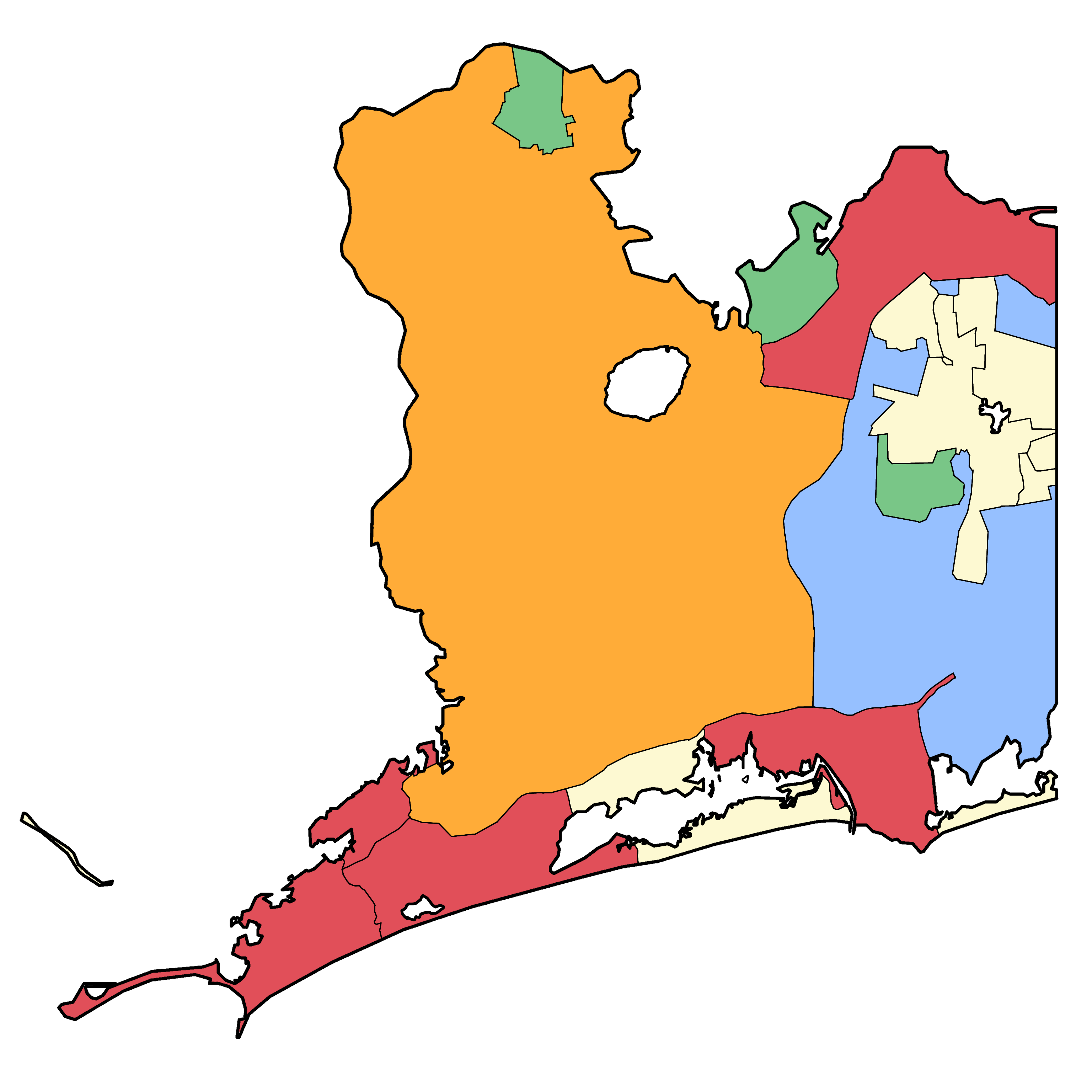
Division map of Westerly R.I.: Census Areas and Villages (Note: To currently available, not every village has a defined border. Villages displayed are Misquamicut, Bradford, Watch Hill, Avondale, Weekapaug, and Ram Point.) Historical District Wildlife preserves Land Management and Land Trusts Unknown

Westerly consists of a number of small villages. Downtown Westerly on the Pawcatuck River is the municipal seat of the area, with the old town post office, library, YMCA, railroad station, former police headquarters (the current headquarters is located on Airport Road), granite buildings, and Wilcox Park. Other villages include Avondale, with antique colonial-style and Queen Anne-style homes; Bradford, with its own post office and postal code; Dunn's Corners; Mastuxet; Misquamicut, a beachfront community with small amounts of nightlife and several hotels; Potter Hill, where the Town Forest is located; Shelter Harbor; Watch Hill, with beaches and summer cottages; Weekapaug; White Rock; and Winnapaug, with public golf courses.

Annual events include the Pawcatuck River Duck Race in April, Virtu Art Festival in May, Shakespeare in the Park and the Summer Pops in June, and Riverglow in July. Movies are shown outdoors on the beach in July and August, and there is a Columbus Day parade in October. Also, the Westerly-Pawcatuck Veterans Board of Control hold two of the oldest parades in the United States. The Memorial Day Parade started in 1867, held in May on Memorial Day, and the Veterans Day Parade started in 1917, held in November on the Saturday of Veterans Day week.

== Demographics ==
Historical population
Census	Pop.	Note	%±
1790	2,298		—
1800	2,329		1.3%
1810	1,911		−17.9%
1820	1,972		3.2%
1830	1,915		−2.9%
1840	1,912		−0.2%
1850	2,763		44.5%
1860	3,470		25.6%
1870	4,709		35.7%
1880	6,104		29.6%
1890	6,813		11.6%
1900	7,541		10.7%
1910	8,696		15.3%
1920	9,952		14.4%
1930	10,997		10.5%
1940	11,199		1.8%
1950	12,380		10.5%
1960	14,267		15.2%
1970	17,248		20.9%
1980	18,580		7.7%
1990	21,605		16.3%
2000	22,966		6.3%
2010	22,787		−0.8%
2020	23,359		2.5%
U.S. Decennial Census

As of the census of 2020, there were 23,359 people and 10,657 households in the town. The population density was 791.3 inhabitants per square mile (305.5/km^{2}). There were 13,245 housing units in the town. The racial makeup of the town was 88.60% White, 0.98% Black or African American, 0.84% Native American, 2.68% Asian, 1.35% from other races, and 5.48% from two or more races. Hispanic or Latino people of any race were 4.61% of the population.

There were 10,657 households, out of which 17.2% had children under the age of 18 living with them, 48.2% were married couples living together, 25.2% had a female householder with no spouse present, and 19.0% had a male householder with no spouse present. Of all households, 13.5% were made up of individuals, and 3.9% had someone living alone who was 65 years of age or older. The average household size was 2.16 and the average family size was 2.69.

In the town, the population was spread out, with 13.0% under the age of 18, 8.7% from 18 to 24, 18.4% from 25 to 44, 31.6% from 45 to 64, and 28.2% who were 65 years of age or older. The median age was 53.7 years.

The median income for a household in the town was $90,933, and the median income for a family was $117,854. The per capita income for the town was $47,826. About 6.2% of the population were below the poverty line, including 4.9% of those under age 18 and 7.7% of those age 65 or over.

The most frequent ancestries among the town's population, according to the 2000 census, were Italian (34.2%), Irish (17.9%) and English (14.2%). Many Italians moved to Westerly from Italy around the start of the 20th century, a majority from Sicily and Calabria, with Italian dialects still being spoken at the homes of many older residents in the town. Many Italian immigrants had come and resided in the Town of Westerly originated from the Town of Acri, Calabria.

== Economy ==
Located within the Town of Westerly are two regional banks headquartered in the town, including Washington Trust Bancorp Inc., a publicly traded regional bank with operations in Rhode Island and Connecticut, and the Westerly Community Credit Union.

== Education ==
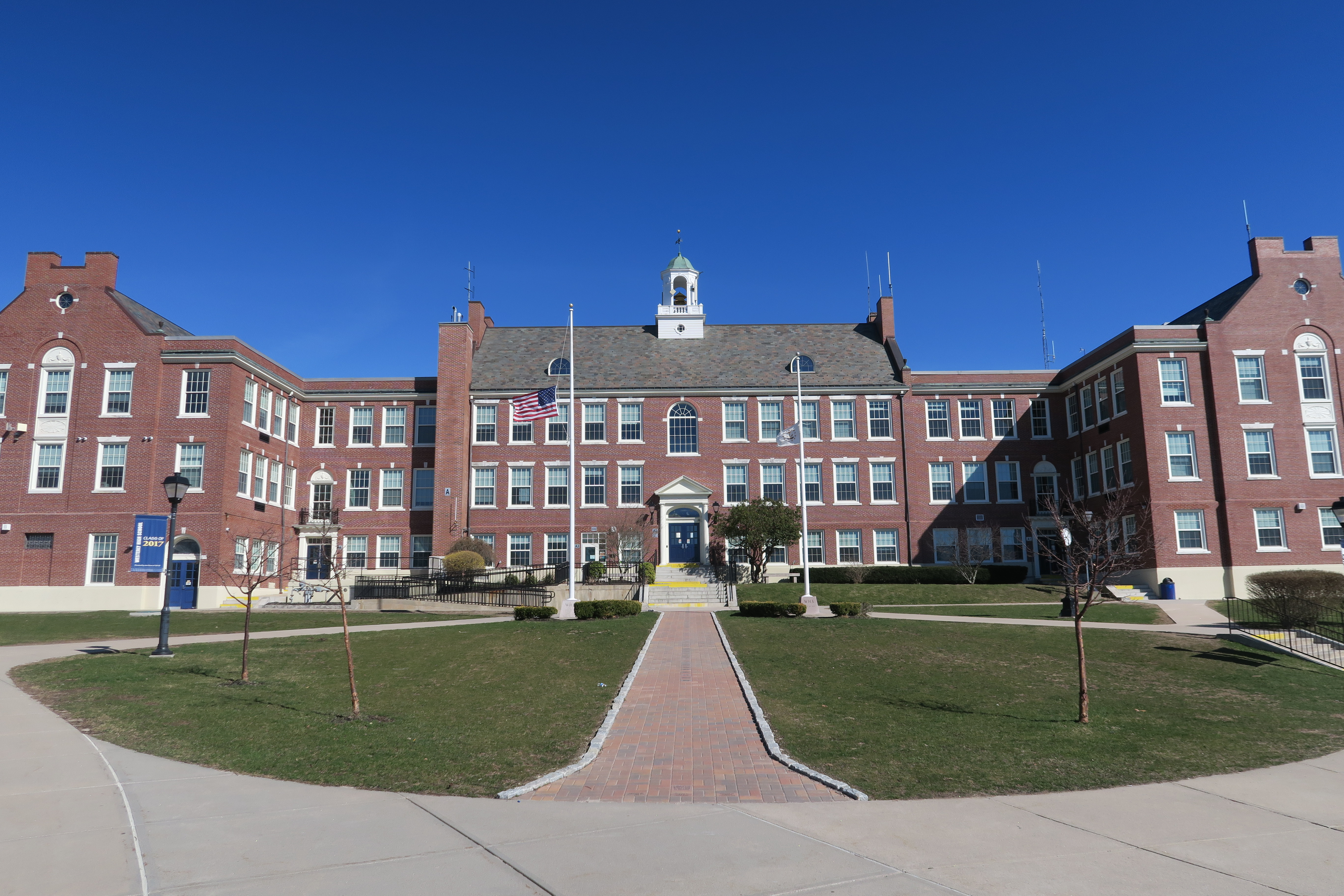
The Westerly High School seen from the front.

The main school system of the Town of Westerly is operated by the Westerly Public Schools, which operates the Westerly High School, Westerly Middle School, Westerly High School Career and Tech (WHS-CTE), and the local elementary schools, including State Street Elementary School, Springbrook Elementary School, and Dunn's Corners Elementary School.

The Rhode Island Office of the Postsecondary Commissioner offers operates three educational centers, one of which is located in the Town of Westerly, the Westerly Education Center, with the purpose of giving residents higher education in business, industry, and provide high-quality educational programs to meet projected workforce growth in the region. The Westerly Education Center works with the Community College of Rhode Island, University of Rhode Island, Rhode Island College, Skills for Rhode Island's Future, the Rhode Island Office of Veteran Services, and more.

=== High School & Career and Tech ===
According to USnews, the Westerly High School ranked #2,806 across the entire United States, and 12th within the State of Rhode Island. Westerly High School hosts a RIDE-certified pathways in its career and technical school branch, the WHS-CTE, offering technical education in different fields. Westerly High School, along with other Rhode Island High Schools such as Chariho Regional High School, participates in SkillsUSA.

== Media ==
Local media sources in Westerly include the daily newspaper company, The Westerly Sun, a daily newspaper with its weekly subdivision The Express, and two local radio stations, being WBLQ (AM) and WPVD-FM. The Westerly Sun is the biggest source of media local to the Town of Westerly, spreading across other towns in Washington County, Rhode Island, and into the State of Connecticut.

== Government ==
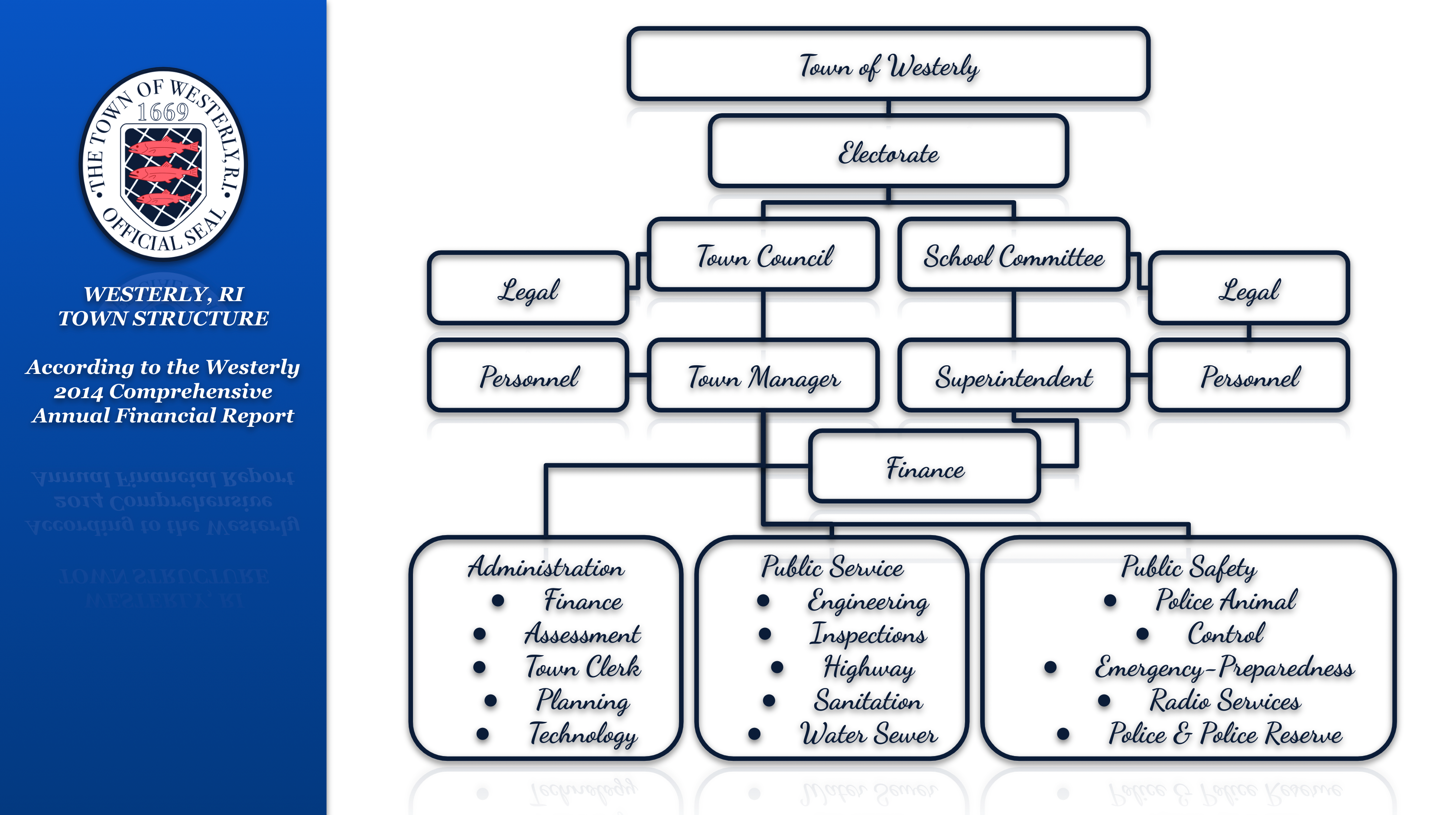
Hierarchy chart of the Town of Westerly according to 2014 Financial Report.

Westerly has a mayor–council government system, which the mayor is called the council president. The current mayor is William J. Aiello since 2022. The Town of Westerly has other positions, including the school committee, and administration, with town manager being Shawn Lacey. Terms of the local council, senator and representative in the Rhode Island General Assembly last two-years, and school committee officials having four-year terms.

=== Town Charter and Town Council ===
Town Council Meeting Room inside of the Westerly Town Hall, with the town seal present on the conference table.

Since 1969, the Town of Westerly has held a charter approved by Rhode Island, structuring the towns government, and allowing autonomy. The town has to abide by state law, but by the town charter can enforce its own laws and policies. Article V, Chapter 1 of the charter defines the number of people who are on the town council. The charter sets the hierarchy of the town government, and allowing town agencies to function similarly to the way department agencies to the United States of to the State of Rhode Island function.

The charter defines the powers of positions, and to what those in power can and cannot do. The Westerly School Committee and Westerly Town Council play a role in town finances and structure, both holding legal power. Along with the divisions of local government, the Westerly Municipal Land Trust plays a role in local politics, which oversees and assists local town departments and commissions with the execution of policies related to land use and preservation, currently as of 2025 holding eleven personnel on the board.

=== Local Elections ===
The Town of Westerly, Rhode Island holds its own local elections, politics, and hosts its own political parties separate from the state and federal political parties such as the United States Democratic Party or the Rhode Island Democratic Party. In the Town of Westerly, there are the parties of Westerly Democratic Town Committee (WDTC) and Westerly Republican Party, which the WDTC holds no affiliation with the Democratic Party of Rhode Island or United States, while the Westerly Republican Party is affiliated with the Republican Party of Rhode Island. The local parties of the Town of Westerly oversee the development of law within the Town Council of Westerly.

Many seats in the local town government of the Town of Westerly local elections, but also a process of also volunteering. Important positions in the town such as Town Council members require election by local residents, while other governmental positions elect members by volunteering with candidates applying to the Town of Westerly government.

=== Public safety ===
Westerly has a set budget of $102 million for the Westerly Police Department in the 2024–2025 fiscal budget. Westerly, RI has a general crime rate of 10 per 1000 residents, with most crime happening in Downtown Westerly, and along the coast. The motto of the Westerly Police Department is Pride, Integrity, and Commitment, with the mission of serving with pride in knowing the excellence delivered on each and every call for service, serving with highest level of moral and ethical standards, and commitment to non-bias, professional service to Westerly residents and tourists.

All law enforcement officers in the Town of Westerly of the Department of Public Safety are appointed or promoted by the Westerly Town Manager, who also holds the power to discipline members of the permanent police force. The disciplinary procedure shall follow Rhode Island General Law, the Law Enforcement Officers' Bill of Rights, and the Collective Bargaining Agreement.

== Transportation ==
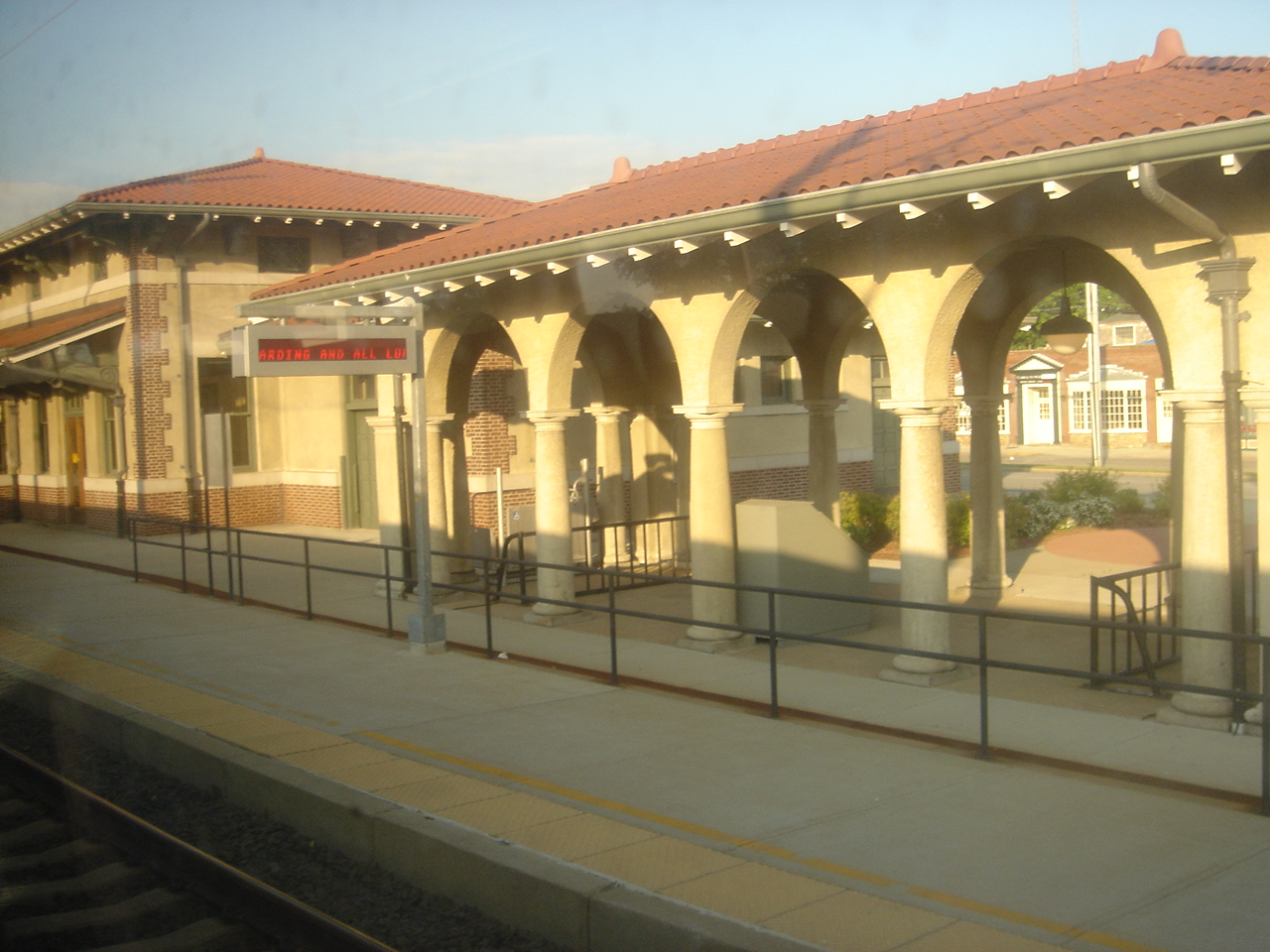
The Westerly Amtrak Station.

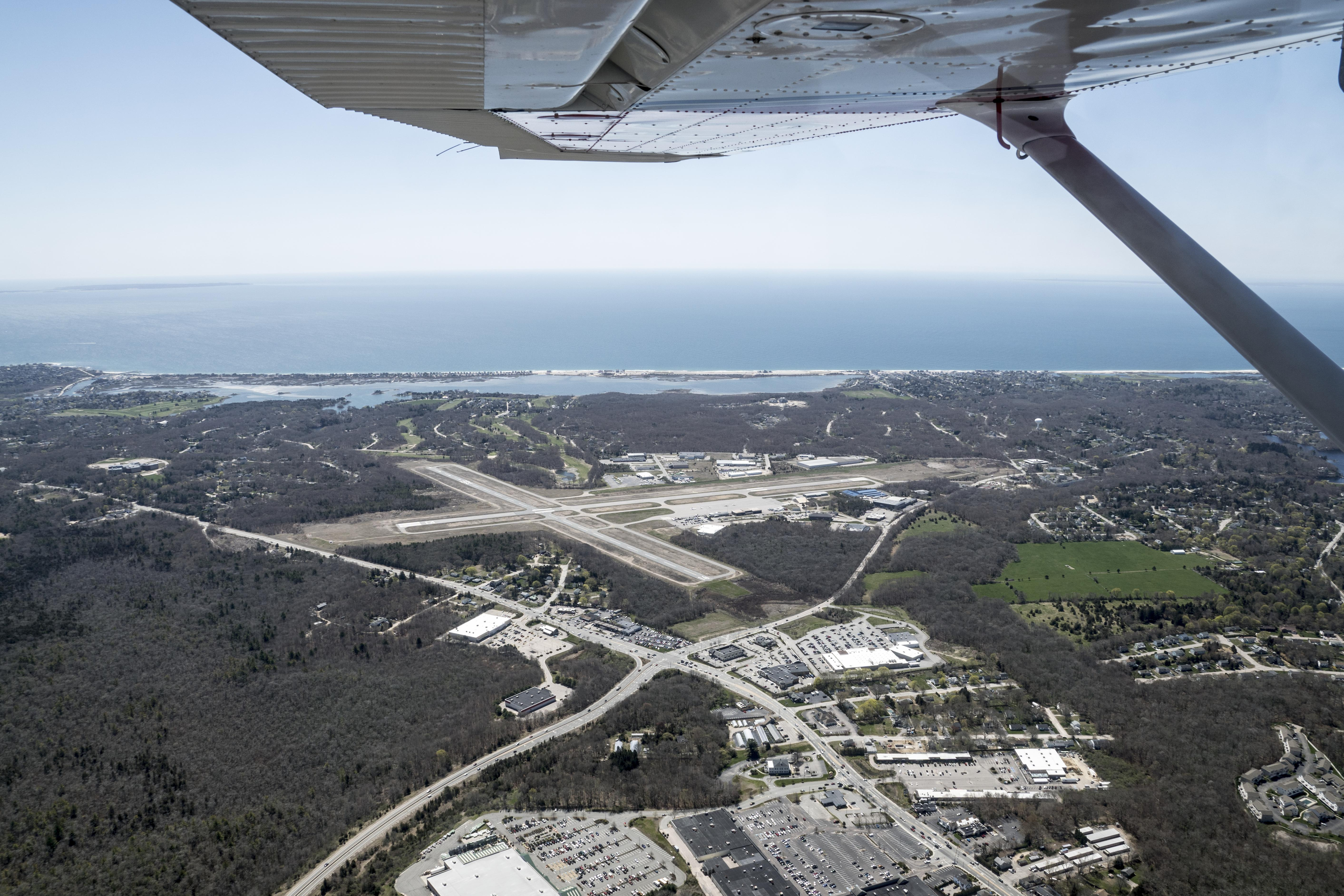
The Westerly State Airport seen in 2016.

In the Town of Westerly, there is the Westerly State Airport, which is served by New England Airlines. Amtrak Northeast Regional trains stop at the Westerly station near downtown, offering service between Washington, DC and Boston. The station itself was closed in October 2016, but passengers can still board and disembark at the platform. Additionally, there have been proposals for CTrail to extend its Shore Line East service eastwards to Westerly station. Rhode Island Public Transit Authority also provides limited service in Westerly, including a weekday express route to Providence, a Friday's only route towards Hope Valley, and a demand-responsive van service that serves the local area on weekdays.

=== Highways and streets ===
The Town of Westerly has U.S. Route 1, and the state routes of: Route 1A, Route 3, Route 91, and Route 78, which Route 78 forms a bypass around Downtown Westerly, nicknamed the Westerly Bypass, and ending near the Westerly State Airport, with three interchanges in Rhode Island; the other endpoint is in Stonington, Connecticut. The Interstate I-95 is approximately five miles away from Westerly, and can be accessed by Connecticut Route 2 and or Rhode Island Route 3. According to a census on all streets, excluding highways and routes, there are currently 626 streets within the Town of Westerly. All streets are managed by the Westerly Department of Development Services, Westerly Public Works Department, and the Rhode Island Department of Transportation, with the WDDS managing street names and management.

== Points of interest ==
There are many places in the Town of Westerly deemed points, including the:

- Westerly High School
- Misquamicut State Beach
- Watch Hill
- Westerly (Amtrak station)
- Westerly State Airport
- Wilcox Park
- Watch Hill
- Misquamicut

=== National Historic Register sites ===
- Babcock-Smith House
- Bradford Village Historic District, in Hopkinton and Westerly
- Flying Horse Carousel
- Former Immaculate Conception Church
- Lewis-Card-Perry House
- Main Street Historic District
- North End Historic District
- Nursery Site, RI-273
- Perry Homestead Historic District
- Ram Point
- U.S. Post Office (Westerly, Rhode Island)
- Watch Hill Historic District
- Weekapaug Inn
- Westerly Armory
- Westerly Downtown Historic District
- Wilcox Park Historic District

== Notable people ==
There have been notable people who are from Westerly, Rhode Island who lived, resided within, or were born in the town. Samuel Ward, Former Governor and Chief Justice of the Rhode Island is one notable person who resided within the Town of Westerly following his retirement from the Title of Colonial Governor. Another example of notable people who have resided or reside in the Town of Westerly, Rhode Island include American singer and songwriter, Taylor Swift, who holds non-permanent beach-side residence in the village of Watch Hill near the Ocean House.

== See also ==
- National Register of Historic Places listings in Washington County, Rhode Island
- The United Theatre
- Stonington, Connecticut
- Westerly Hospital
