= Weekapaug, Rhode Island =

Census-designated place in Rhode Island, United States

- Census-designated place
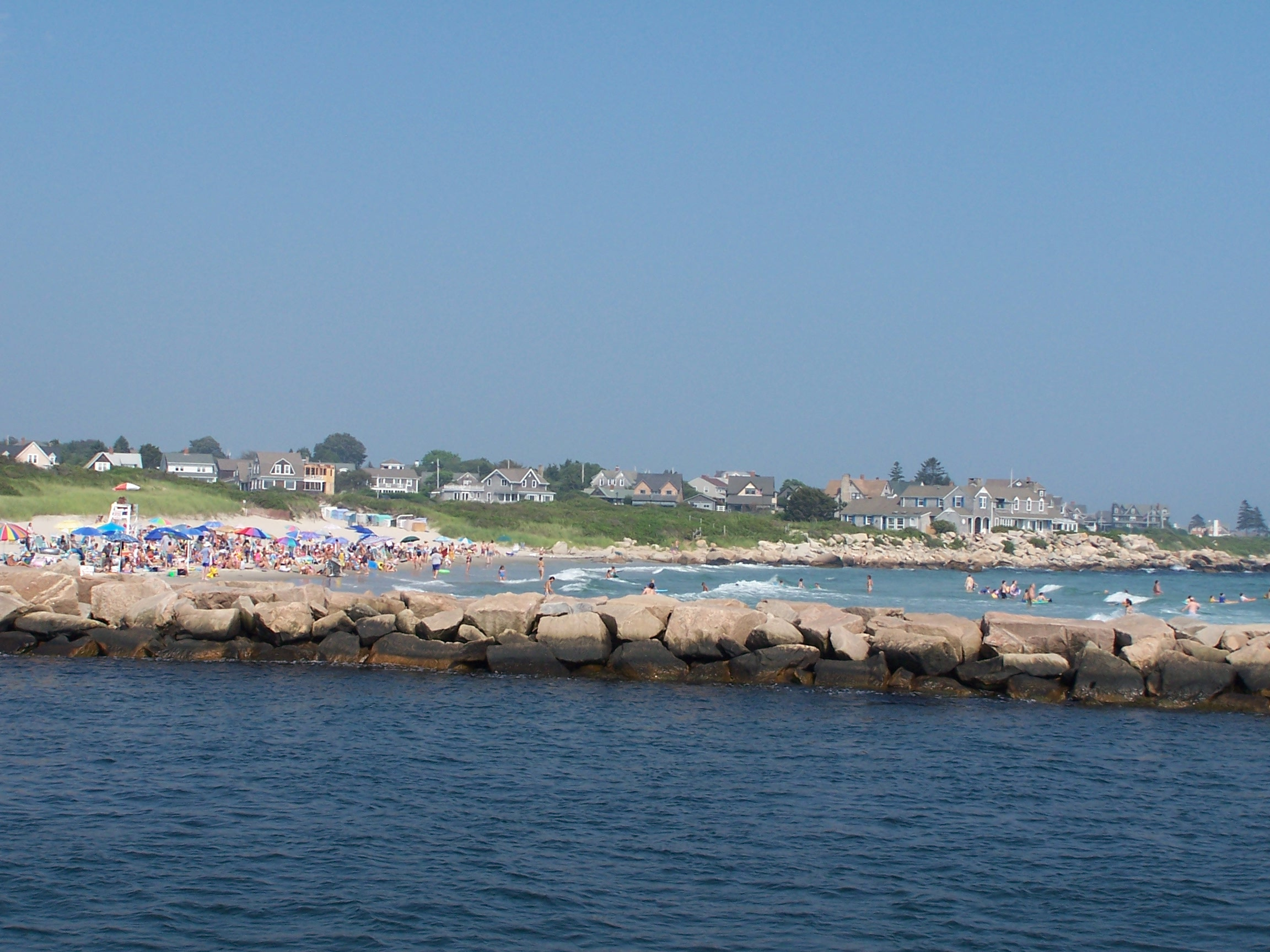
- A photo of Weekapaug showing the breachway, jetty, channel, Fenway Beach, and numerous ocean front homes.

- Location in the state of Rhode Island
- Coordinates: 41°19′51″N 71°45′18″W
- Country: United States
- State: Rhode Island
- County: Washington

Area
  - Total: 1.20 sq mi (3.10 km^{2})
  - Land: 1.16 sq mi (3.01 km^{2})
  - Water: 0.035 sq mi (0.09 km^{2})
- Elevation: 6.6 ft (2 m)

Population (2020)
  - Total: 467
  - Density: 401.7/sq mi (155.09/km^{2})
- Time zone: UTC-5 (Eastern (EST))
  - Summer (DST): UTC-4 (EDT)
- ZIP code: 02891
- Area code: 401
- FIPS code: 44-75920
- GNIS feature ID: 2631342

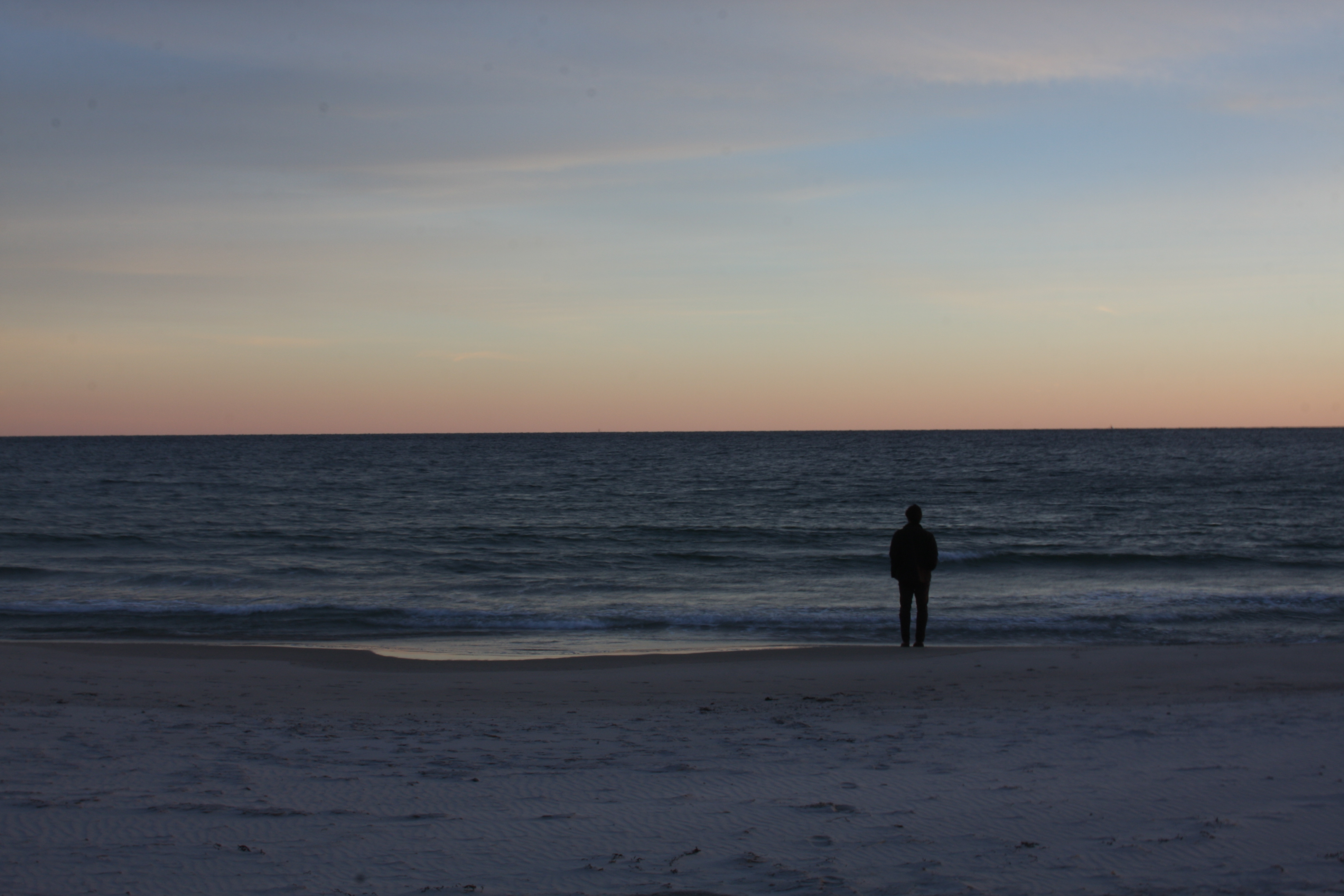
Weekapaug, Rhode Island at sunset

Weekapaug (/ˈwiːkəpɔːɡ/) is a census-designated place in southern Washington County, Rhode Island, United States, part of the town of Westerly. As of the 2020 census, Weekapaug had a population of 467.

== History ==
"Weekapaug" is a Narragansett word meaning "at the end of the pond". The area is not as well known as neighboring Watch Hill, although it has had summer cottages since 1877. It was known as "Noyes Beach" from 1701 to 1899, named after Reverend James Noyes who purchased 300 acres (1.2 km^{2}).

== Geography ==
According to the United States Census Bureau, the CDP has a total area of 1.20 mi^{2} (3.1 km^{2}), of which 1.16 mi^{2} (3.0 km^{2}) is land and 0.036 mi^{2} (0.09 km^{2}) (3.00%) is water. The Winnapaug and Quonochontaug salt ponds dominate the area. Each pond is open to the Atlantic Ocean via a breachway lined with rock jetties. Most of the rock is granite which is readily available in the Westerly area, the quarrying of which was once its primary industry.

== Demographics ==
Historical population
Census	Pop.	Note	%±
2020	467		—
U.S. Decennial Census

=== 2020 census ===
The 2020 United States census counted 467 people, 243 households, and 82 families in Weekapaug. The population density was 401.5 inhabitants per square mile (155.0/km^{2}). There were 657 housing units at an average density of 564.9 per square mile (218.1/km^{2}). The racial makeup was 95.07% (444) white or European American (94.65% non-Hispanic white), 0.43% (2) black or African-American, 0.21% (1) Native American or Alaska Native, 1.28% (6) Asian, 0.0% (0) Pacific Islander or Native Hawaiian, 0.21% (1) from other races, and 2.78% (13) from two or more races. Hispanic or Latino of any race was 1.28% (6) of the population.

Of the 243 households, 15.2% had children under the age of 18; 55.6% were married couples living together; 21.4% had a female householder with no spouse or partner present. 33.3% of households consisted of individuals and 17.7% had someone living alone who was 65 years of age or older. The average household size was 2.1 and the average family size was 3.0. The percent of those with a bachelor's degree or higher was estimated to be 31.3% of the population.

12.4% of the population was under the age of 18, 4.3% from 18 to 24, 15.8% from 25 to 44, 32.3% from 45 to 64, and 35.1% who were 65 years of age or older. The median age was 59.0 years. For every 100 females, the population had 97.0 males. For every 100 females ages 18 and older, there were 96.6 males.

The 2016–2020 5-year American Community Survey estimates show that the median household income was $59,583 (with a margin of error of +/- $11,252) and the median family income was $48,482 (+/- $7,123). Males had a median income of $31,583 (+/- $16,694) versus $34,167 (+/- $17,926) for females. The median income for those above 16 years old was $33,250 (+/- $12,323). Approximately, 7.3% of families and 4.4% of the population were below the poverty line, including 7.4% of those under the age of 18 and 0.0% of those ages 65 or over.

== In popular culture ==
Phish's song "Weekapaug Groove" is named after the town.
