= Ram Point =

Historic house in Rhode Island, United States

- U.S. National Register of Historic Places
- Location within Rhode Island Location within the United States
- Location: 77 Watch Hill Rd., Westerly, Rhode Island
- Coordinates: 41°20′16″N 71°49′45″W
- Built: 1903
- Architectural style: Colonial Revival
- NRHP reference No.: 15000831
- Added to NRHP: November 24, 2015

Ram Point is a historic summer estate property at 77 Watch Hill Road in Westerly, Rhode Island. It is located at the head of an eponymous geographic features, which projects into the Pawcatuck River between downtown Westerly and the Watch Hill area. The property includes a suite of buildings, the principal one being a large two story Colonial Revival wood-frame building. The house was built c. 1903 for Dr. John Whitridge Williams to a design most likely by Douglas Thomas, Jr. of Baltimore, Maryland. The property is believed to be one of only two Rhode Island works by Thomas; the other, also designed for a member of the Williams family, is located across Babcock Cove from Ram Point.

The house was listed on the National Register of Historic Places in 2015.

== See also ==
- National Register of Historic Places listings in Washington County, Rhode Island
