= Babcock–Smith House =

Historic house in Rhode Island, United States

- U.S. National Register of Historic Places
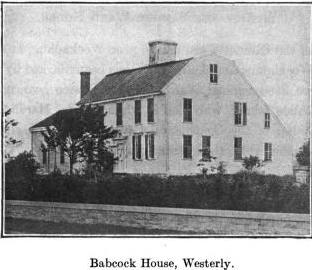

- Location within Rhode Island Location within the United States
- Interactive map showing the location for Babcock-Smith House
- Location: 124 Granite St., Westerly, Rhode Island
- Coordinates: 41°22′16″N 71°49′13″W
- Built: 1750
- Architectural style: Early Georgian
- NRHP reference No.: 72000008
- Added to NRHP: July 24, 1972

The Babcock–Smith House is a historic house in Westerly, Rhode Island.

The house was built around 1734. Dr. Joshua Babcock, a correspondent with Benjamin Franklin, lived in the house and hosted Franklin and likely General George Washington at the home. Babcock served also as a general in the state militia, as a justice of the Rhode Island Supreme Court, and as Westerly's first postmaster in the 1770s. He operated the post office and a general store out of this house. Babcock died in 1783 and "his family occupied the house until 1817. When his second wife, Anna Maxson Babcock, died in 1812, the property was passed to Joshua’s grandchildren, Dudley Babcock, Paul Babcock, and Hannah Phelps, who sold the house and 200 acres to Joseph Noyes 2nd. The property then had several owners, became a tenant farm and gradually fell into disrepair.

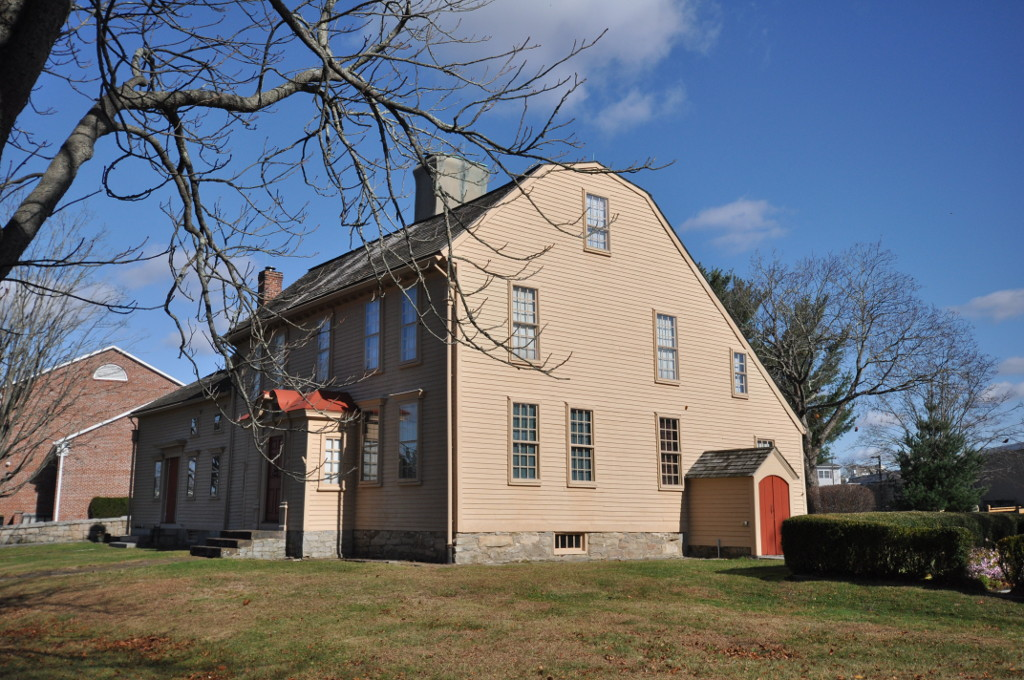
The house in 2019

Orlando Smith bought the property in 1848; he repaired the house and started a successful granite business based on a granite outcrop he had discovered there.

The house was added to the National Register of Historic Places and became a museum in 1972.

== See also ==
- National Register of Historic Places listings in Washington County, Rhode Island
