= Misquamicut, Rhode Island =

Census-designated place in Rhode Island, United States

Misquamicut
- Census-designated place and Village
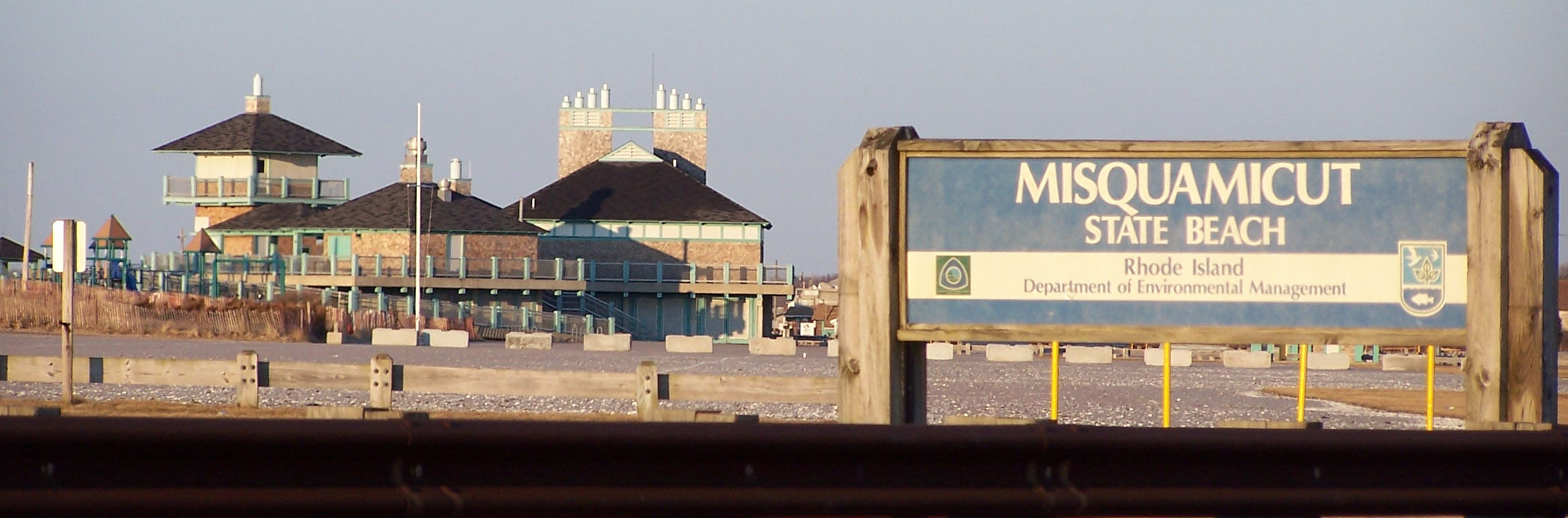
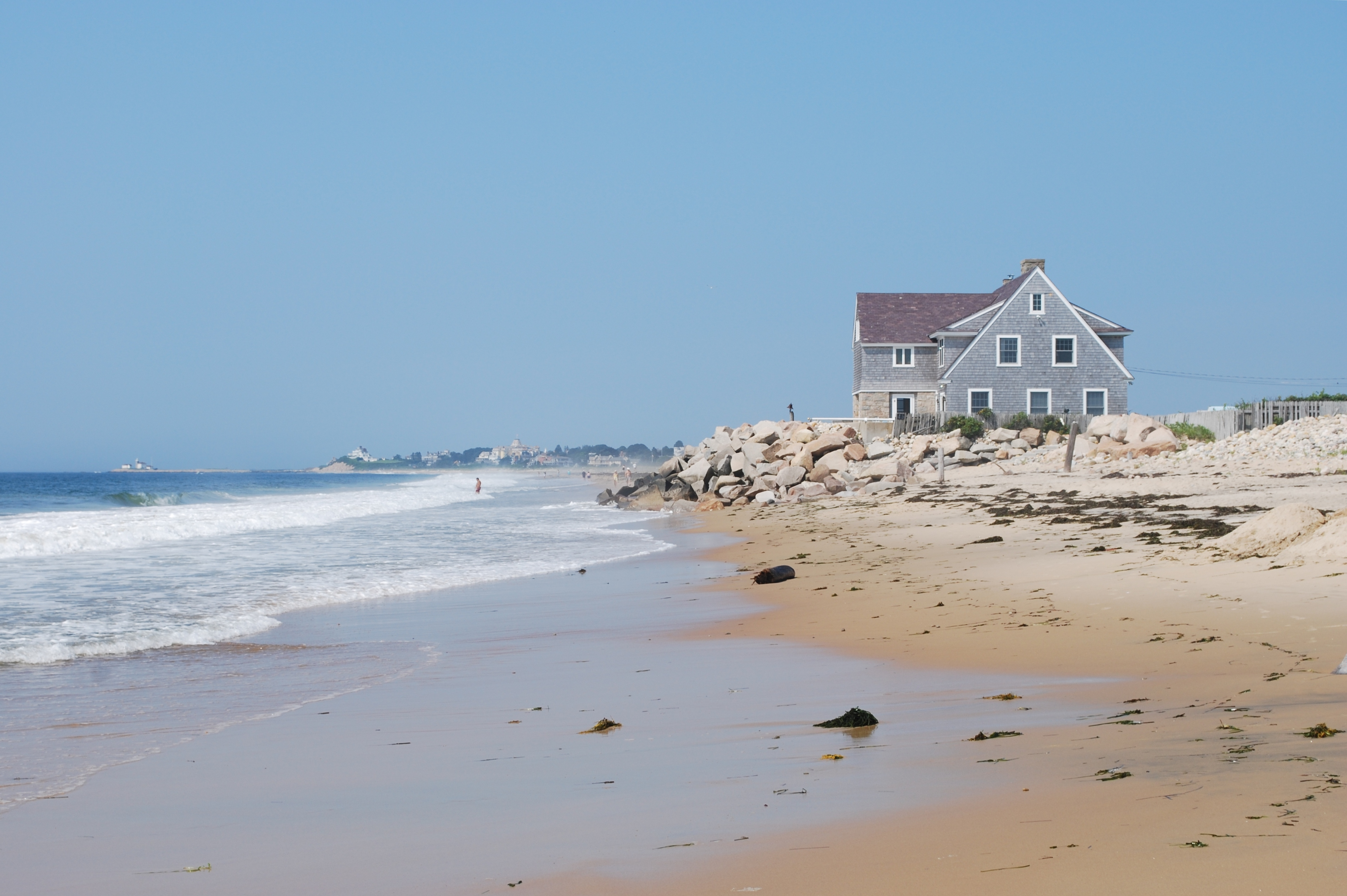
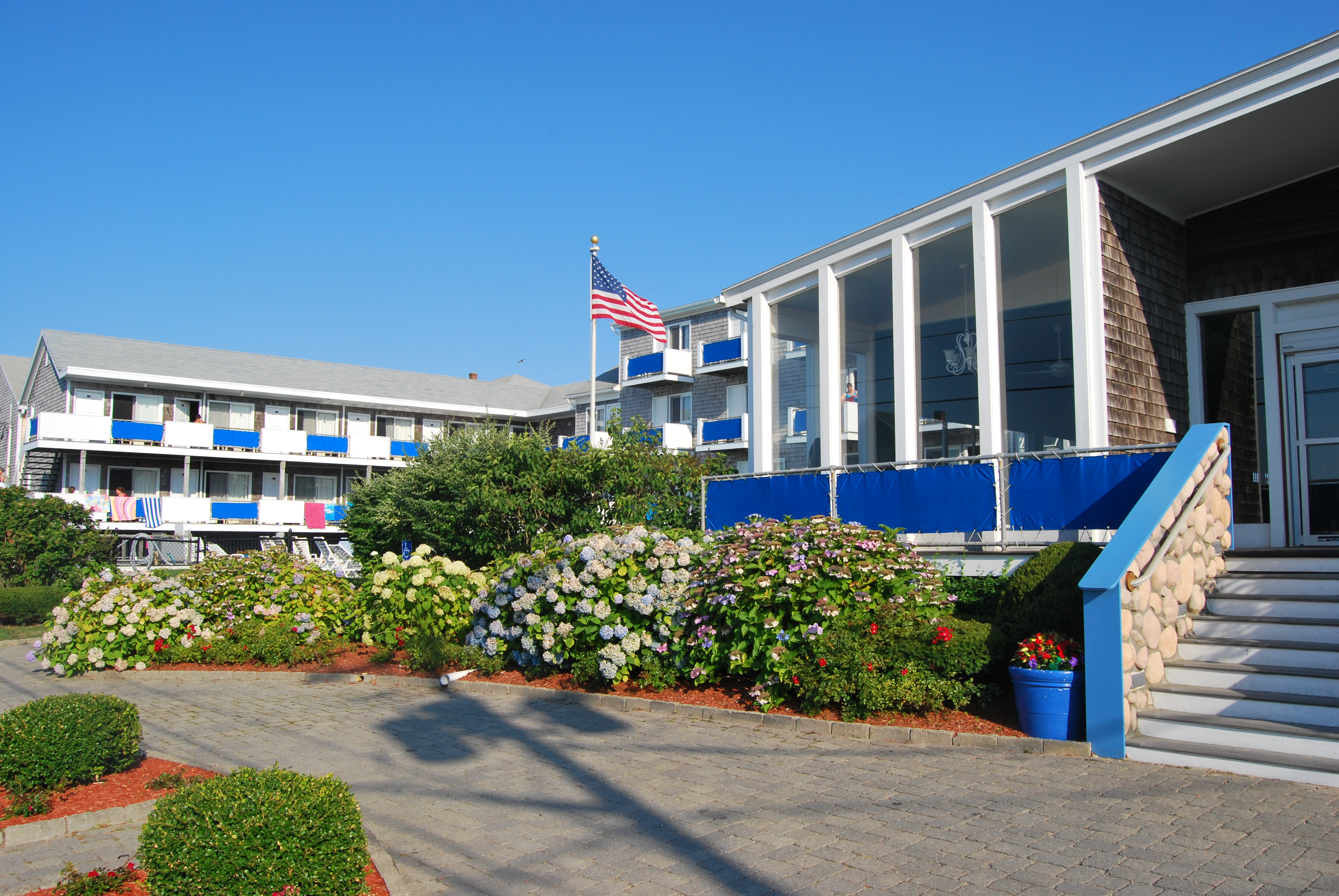
- Panorama of Misquamicut State Beach (2008) Beach house located in Misquamicut (2009) Pleasant View Inn (2010)

- Location in the state of Rhode Island Misquamicut (the United States)
- Coordinates: 41°19′26″N 71°49′19″W
- Country: United States
- State: Rhode Island
- County: Washington
- Town: Westerly

Area
  - Total: 1.25 sq mi (3.23 km^{2})
  - Land: 1.17 sq mi (3.04 km^{2})
  - Water: 0.073 sq mi (0.19 km^{2})
- Elevation: 3.3 ft (1 m)

Population (2020)
  - Total: 434
  - Density: 370.1/sq mi (142.89/km^{2})
- Time zone: UTC-5 (Eastern (EST))
  - Summer (DST): UTC-4 (EDT)
- ZIP code: 02891
- Area code: 401
- FIPS code: 44-46000
- GNIS feature ID: 1217591

Misquamicut (MISS-kwahm-eh-kut) is a census-designated place and fire district in southern Washington County, Rhode Island, United States. It is part of the town of Westerly. The population was listed as 434 in the 2020 census.

== Name ==
Misquamicut is a Narragansett word meaning "Red Fish Place" or "Salmon Place". In 2008, fisheries expert Saul Saila determined "Salmon Place" was a misinterpretation and that instead the fish was a large sea-running trout.

== History ==
The district was once known as Pleasant View. The land was purchased from Chief Sosoa of the Montauks in 1661. The name was changed from Pleasant View to Misquamicut in 1928. The area suffered a series of devastating hurricanes that wiped out beach homes, hotels, and other structures in 1938, 1944, and 1954. A portion of the oceanfront became Misquamicut State Beach in 1959.

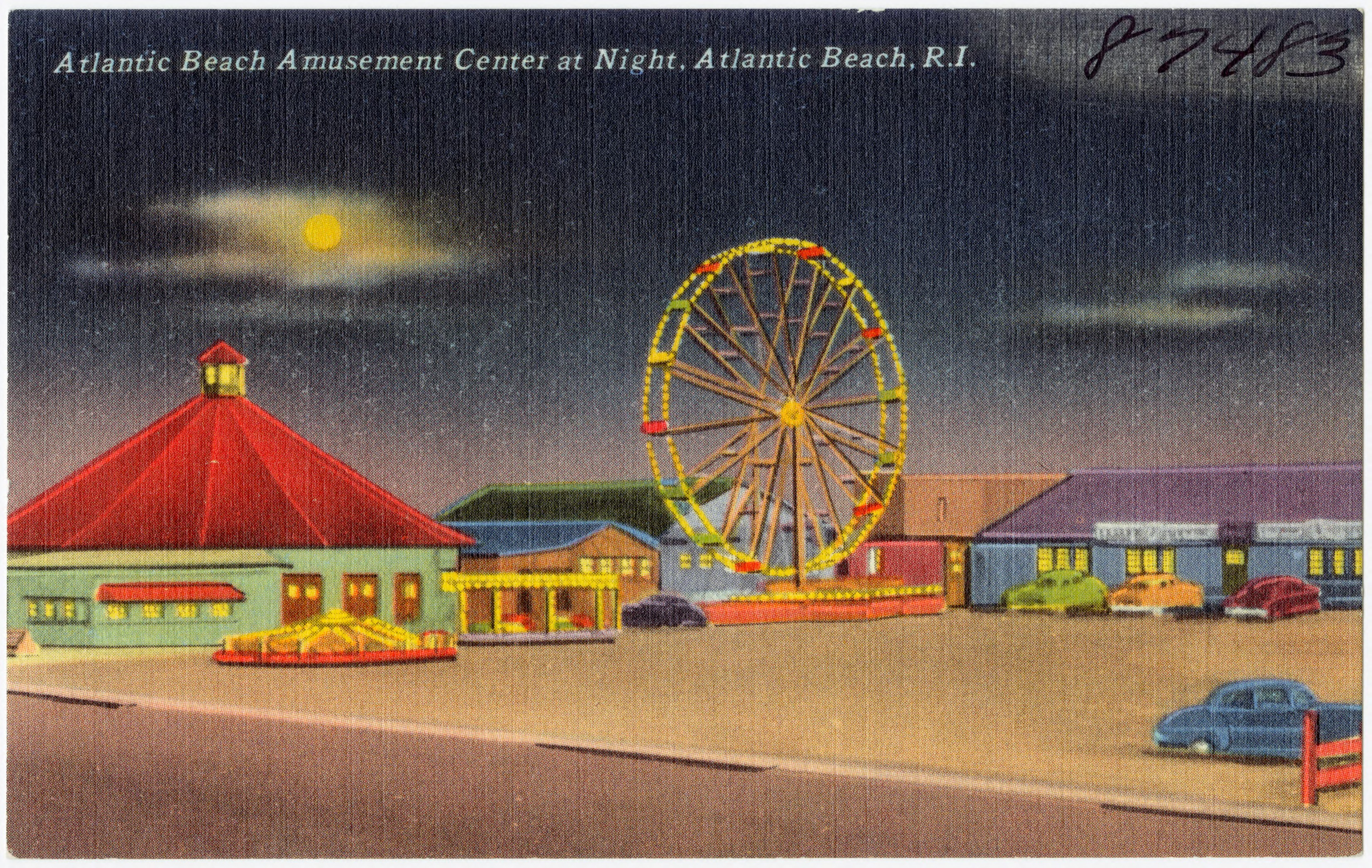
1940s postcard

Atlantic Beach Park is a privately operated amusement center with 12 acres (49,000 m^{2}) of land and buildings within the Misquamicut section of beachfront. It lies south of Misquamicut State Beach and north of Winnapaug Pond, a source of Rhode Island quahogs and bay scallops.

This section of Misquamicut was originally called "Atlantic Beach Casino". It retains a carousel with antique band organ, rides, bumper cars, a game room, and an ice cream stand. More recently, miniature golf, go-carts, a batting cage, water slides, and a gift shop have been added.

== Geography ==
According to the U.S. Census Bureau, Misquamicut has a total area of 1.25 mi^{2} (3.23 km^{2}), of which 1.17 mi^{2} (3.04 km^{2}) is land and 0.075 mi^{2} (0.19 km^{2}), or 6.0%, is water.

== Demographics ==
Historical population
Census	Pop.	Note	%±
2010	390		—
2020	434		11.3%
U.S. Decennial Census

=== 2020 census ===
The 2020 United States census counted 434 people, 254 households, and 120 families in Misquamicut. The population density was 370.0 per square mile (142.9/km^{2}). There were 869 housing units at an average density of 740.8 per square mile (286.0/km^{2}). The racial makeup was 96.54% (419) white or European American (96.31% non-Hispanic white), 0.0% (0) black or African-American, 0.69% (3) Native American or Alaska Native, 0.46% (2) Asian, 0.0% (0) Pacific Islander or Native Hawaiian, 0.23% (1) from other races, and 2.07% (9) from two or more races. Hispanic or Latino of any race was 1.15% (5) of the population.

Of the 254 households, 10.6% had children under the age of 18; 40.6% were married couples living together; 28.3% had a female householder with no spouse or partner present. 47.2% of households consisted of individuals and 24.8% had someone living alone who was 65 years of age or older. The average household size was 1.8 and the average family size was 2.2. The percent of those with a bachelor’s degree or higher was estimated to be 44.2% of the population.

6.0% of the population was under the age of 18, 2.5% from 18 to 24, 11.3% from 25 to 44, 35.3% from 45 to 64, and 44.9% who were 65 years of age or older. The median age was 63.7 years. For every 100 females, the population had 109.7 males. For every 100 females ages 18 and older, there were 107.1 males.

The 2016–2020 5-year American Community Survey estimates show that the median household income was $74,375 (with a margin of error of +/- $47,378) and the median family income was $118,214 (+/- $26,394). Females had a median income of $45,536 (+/- $27,563). The median income for those above 16 years old was $47,500 (+/- $32,404). Approximately, 10.0% of families and 8.2% of the population were below the poverty line, including 53.8% of those under the age of 18 and 0.0% of those ages 65 or over.

The ancestry was 36% Italian, 23.6% Irish, 20.9% English, 10.6% German, 4.7% Polish, 3.4% French, and 2.2% Scottish.
