= John Whitridge Williams =

American physician (1866–1931)

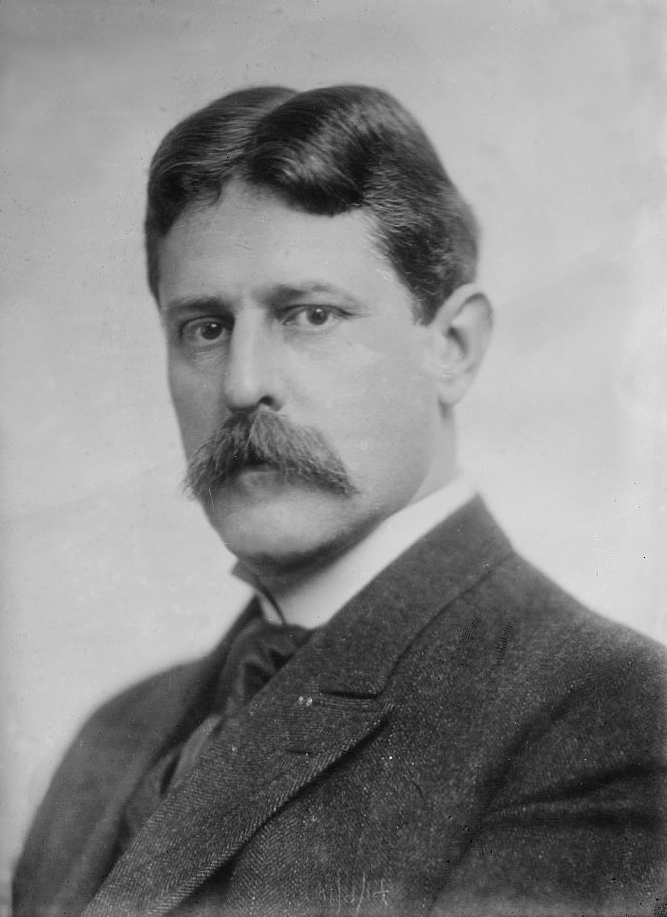
- Born: January 26, 1866; Baltimore, Maryland, U.S.
- Died: October 21, 1931 (aged 65); Baltimore, Maryland, U.S.
- Resting place: Green Mount Cemetery; Baltimore, Maryland, U.S.
- Education: Johns Hopkins University (AB); University of Maryland School of Medicine (MD); University of Pittsburgh (LLB)
- Spouses: Margaretta S. Brown (m. 1892) C. DeW. Thebald Pennington (m. 1930)
- Children: 3

Signature
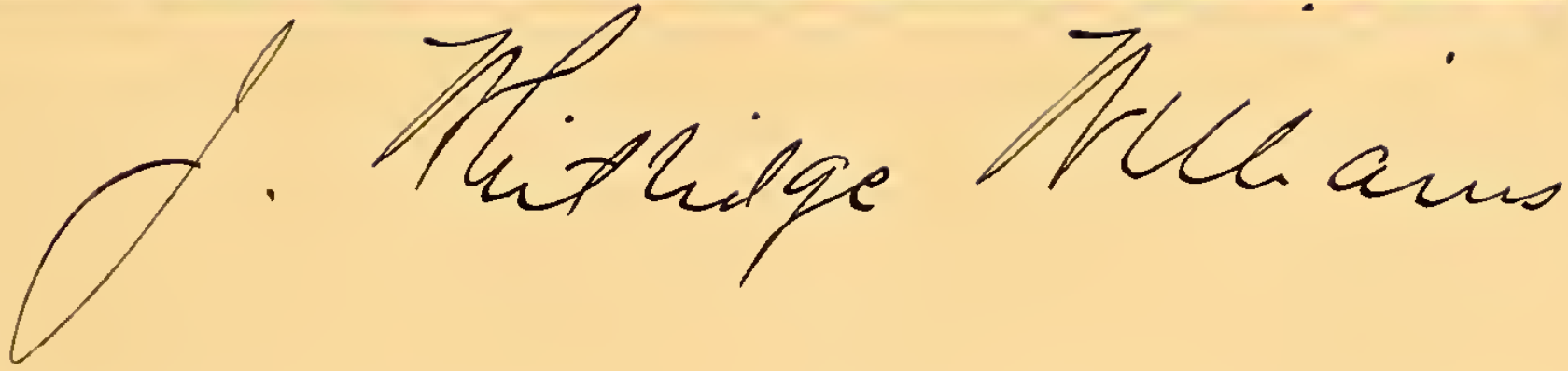

John Whitridge Williams (January 26, 1866 – October 21, 1931) was a pioneering obstetrician at Johns Hopkins Hospital. Williams was also an acclaimed author, as he was able to contribute 137 publications regarding his findings.

== Early life ==
John Whitridge Williams was born in Baltimore, Maryland, on January 26, 1866.

He received his A.B. from the Johns Hopkins University in 1886. He received his M.D. from the University of Maryland School of Medicine in 1888. He then studied bacteriology and pathology at universities in Berlin, Vienna, Leipzig, Prague and Paris from 1888 to 1895. He graduated with a Bachelor of Laws from the University of Pittsburgh in 1915. He later returned to Heidelberg for a year of research and visited Trinity College Dublin in 1912.

== Career ==
After serving under Dr. Howard A. Kelly, he was appointed as chief of Obstetrics at the Johns Hopkins Hospital. In 1889 he returned to Baltimore to be an assistant to Howard Kelly at the Johns Hopkins Hospital. From 1909 to 1923, Williams served as dean of the Johns Hopkins University Medical School. In 1923, Williams resigned to resume research in obstetrics and direct a women's clinic at the hospital.

In 1931, Williams was active in efforts to repeal the federal law forbidding sending birth control information through the mail.

IN 1913, Williams was president of the American Gynecological Society. In 1913, Williams headed the American Society of the Study and Prevention of Infant Mortality.

== Personal life ==
Williams married Margaretta S. Brown, daughter of General Stewart Brown, in 1892. They had three daughters, Mrs. F Brayton Wood, Mrs. Eveleth W. Bridgeman and Mrs. Emory Niles. He later married Mrs. C. DeW. Thebald Pennington in April 1930. Williams lived at 107 East Chase Street in Baltimore.

He died on October 21, 1931, at Johns Hopkins Hospital from complications following an abdominal surgery performed by his colleague J. M. T. Finney. He was buried at Green Mount Cemetery in Baltimore.

== Legacy ==
J. Whitridge Williams was the author of the first five editions of the Williams Obstetrics textbook.

== See also ==
- Ram Point, Williams' summer estate in Rhode Island
