= Joshua Babcock =

American physician, military officer and judge (1707–1783)

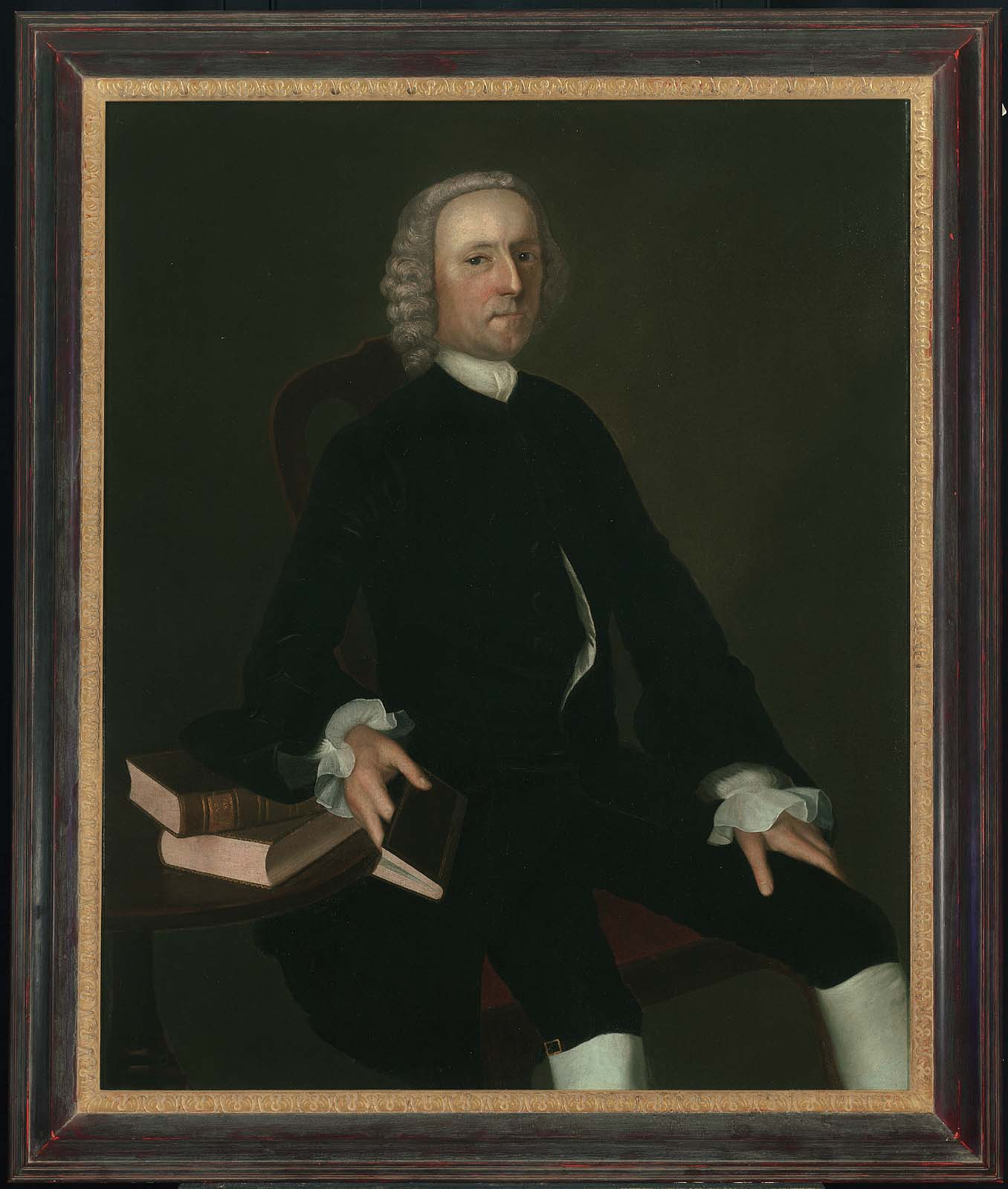
- Portrait by Joseph Blackburn

2nd and 10th Chief Justice of the Rhode Island Supreme Court
- In office January 1749 – May 1751
- Preceded by: Gideon Cornell
- Succeeded by: Stephen Hopkins
- In office August 1763 – October 1763
- Preceded by: Joseph Russell
- Succeeded by: John Banister

Personal details
- Born: 1707 Westerly, Rhode Island
- Died: 1783 (aged 76)
- Relations: John B. Babcock (great-great grandson)
- Children: 9
- Education: Yale College, 1724
- Occupation: Physician, postmaster, chief justice

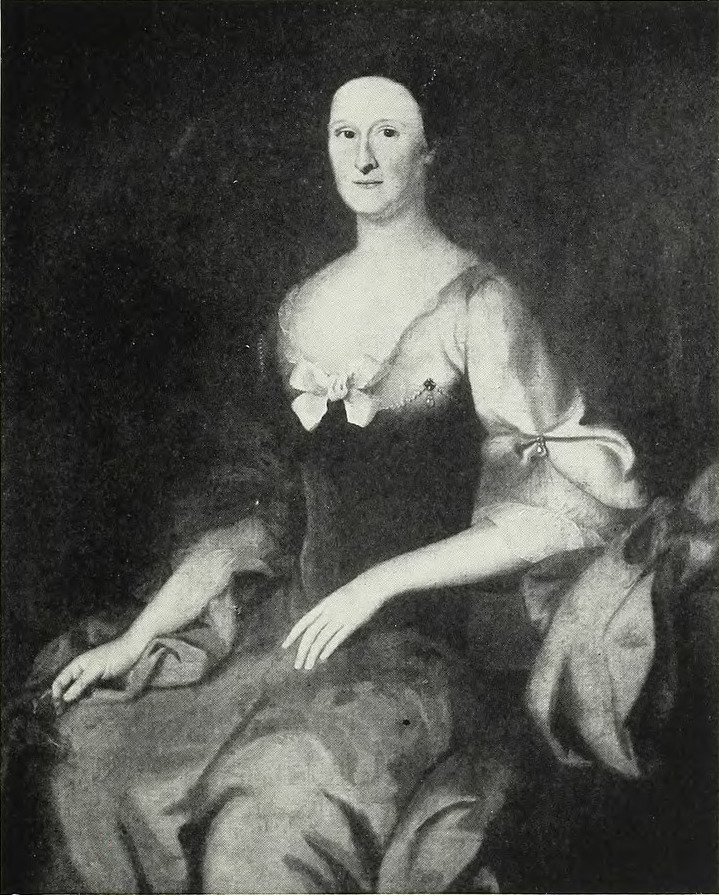
Hannah Stanton Babcock

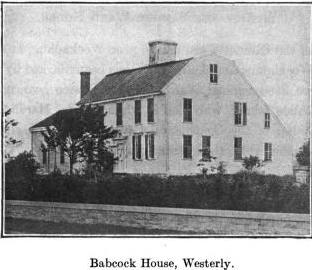
Babcock-Smith House in Westerly

Joshua Babcock (1707 – 1783) was an American physician, military officer and judge.

== Biography ==
=== Early life ===
Babcock was born in Westerly, Rhode Island, in 1707 to James Babcock and Elizabeth Saunders, who were amongst Westerly's earliest settlers. Babcock became a Seventh Day Baptist as a young man. In 1724, he graduated from Yale College as Yale's first Rhode Island graduate. He then studied medicine in Boston and London and returned to Westerly to practice medicine in 1734. Around this time he married and purchased the Babcock-Smith House. Babcock later served as a justice of the Rhode Island Supreme Court, serving as an associate justice from May 1747 to May 1749 and chief justice from May 1749 to May 1751 and from August 1763 to May 1764.

In May 1758, he was elected a deputy from Westerly to the Rhode Island General Assembly. In May 1759, he was elected speaker of the House of Deputies and served for one year. He left office in May 1761.

Babcock joined John Brown, Nicholas Brown, William Ellery, Stephen Hopkins, the Reverend James Manning, the Reverend Ezra Stiles and several others as an original fellow or trustee for the chartering of the College in the English Colony of Rhode Island and Providence Plantations.

Babcock became Westerly's first Postmaster in the 1770s, operating a post office from his home.

=== Revolutionary War service ===
Babcock returned as a deputy to the General Assembly in May 1773 and served until May 1777.

During the American Revolution, Babcock served as the major general in command of the state militia, beginning in October 1775, and hosted General George Washington while serving in that capacity in 1776. He was relieved as militia commander in December 1776 by Major General Joseph Nightingale. Babcock also served on the War Council, procured equipment for the town's troops, and served as a paymaster.

As a legislator, he signed Rhode Island's state declaration of independence on May 4, 1776, before the national Declaration of Independence on July 4. Joshua Babcock was also a friend of Benjamin Franklin and often hosted Franklin when he passed through Rhode Island to Boston on postmaster duties.

In May 1779, he was elected one the state's ten assistants which were, effectively, the state's senators in the state General Assembly. He served a single one-year term.

Babcock died in 1783, aged 76.

== Family ==
Joshua Babcock married Hannah Stanton in 1735 and they had several children: Henry Babcock, Luke Babcock, Adam Babcock, Hannah Babcock, Frances Babcock, Paul Babcock, Amelia Babcock, Sally Babcock, and Harriet Babcock. Babcock married Anna Maxson Babcock after Hannah's death in 1778. Anna died in 1812.

He was the great-great-grandfather of John B. Babcock.

== Legacy ==
Babcock's home in Westerly, the Babcock-Smith House, has been preserved and restored and is open to the public.
