= John B. Babcock =

United States Army general

John Babcock
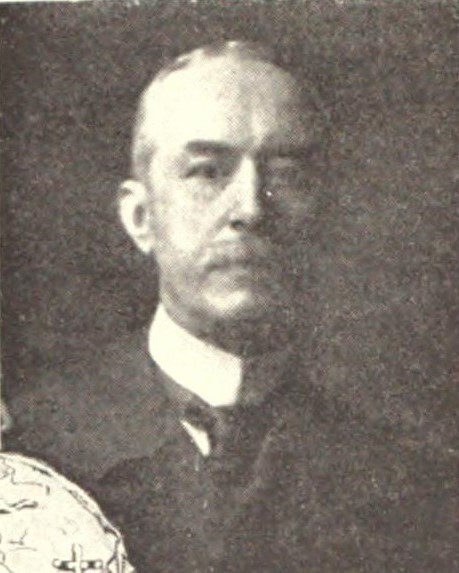
- Born: February 7, 1843; New Orleans, Louisiana, U.S.
- Died: April 26, 1909 (aged 66) on board the SS Prinz Friedrich Wilhelm
- Military career
- Allegiance: United States
- Branch: United States Army
- Service years: 1862 – 1865, 1867 – 1903
- Rank: Brigadier general
- Unit: 5th Cavalry Regiment
- Conflicts: American Civil War; Indian Wars

John Breckinridge Babcock (February 7, 1843 – April 26, 1909) was a US Army officer who received the Medal of Honor for his actions during the Indian Wars. (Note - his obituary in the New York Times states he was born in 1847, but this is not supported by the Official Army Register.)

== Life and military career ==
Babcock was born in New Orleans, a great-great-grandson of Joshua Babcock. He joined the 37th New York Volunteer Infantry as a sergeant in 1862. After being commissioned a second lieutenant in November 1862, he fought in several battles that took place in Louisiana. He reached the rank of major of volunteers in the 62nd New York Volunteer Infantry on January 1, 1865, three months before the end of the war. He resigned his commission on July 23, 1865.

Babcock was appointed to the Regular Army as second lieutenant on January 22, 1867, and fought against the Kiowa and the Cheyenne during the Indian Wars. He was promoted to first lieutenant in 1868, to captain in 1877, to major in 1893 and to lieutenant colonel in 1897.

In 1897 he received the Medal of Honor for gallantry in action in 1869.

After the outbreak of the Spanish–American War, he was promoted to brigadier general of volunteers in June 1898 but reverted to his Regular Army rank of lieutenant colonel in November of the same year.

He was promoted to colonel in February 1901 and was promoted to the rank of brigadier general on August 7, 1903, and retired the next day.

General Babcock died from Bright's disease on board the SS Prinz Friedrich Wilhelm, while traveling from Bremen to New York City.

He was a member of the California Commandery of the Military Order of the Loyal Legion of the United States (MOLLUS). He was also a member of the Sons of the Revolution and the Sons of the American Revolution.

== Family ==
General Babcock's son, Conrad S. Babcock, graduated from West Point in 1898 and served during the Spanish–American War and the Philippine Insurrection. He rose to the rank of colonel during the First World War and received the Distinguished Service Medal and two Silver Stars. He was a hereditary member of MOLLUS. He retired from the Army in 1937 and was promoted to brigadier general on the retired list in 1940.

Conrad Babcock had two sons who were career army officers: Major General C. Stanton Babcock, who was an aide to Secretary of State John Foster Dulles and Colonel Charles P. Babcock.

== Medal of Honor citation ==
Rank and organization: First Lieutenant, 5th U.S. Cavalry. Place and date: At Spring Creek, Nebr., May 16, 1869. Entered service at: Stonington, Conn. Birth: New Orleans, La. Date of issue: September 18, 1897.

Citation

While serving with a scouting column, this officer's troop was attacked by a vastly superior force of Indians. Advancing to high ground, he dismounted his men, remaining mounted himself to encourage them, and there fought the Indians until relieved, his horse being wounded.

== Awards ==
- Medal of Honor
- Civil War Campaign Medal
- Indian Campaign Medal
- Spanish War Service Medal

== See also ==
- List of Medal of Honor recipients for the Indian Wars
- List of people from New Orleans
