= Winnapaug Pond =

Lake in Washington County, Rhode Island, United States

- Brightman Pond
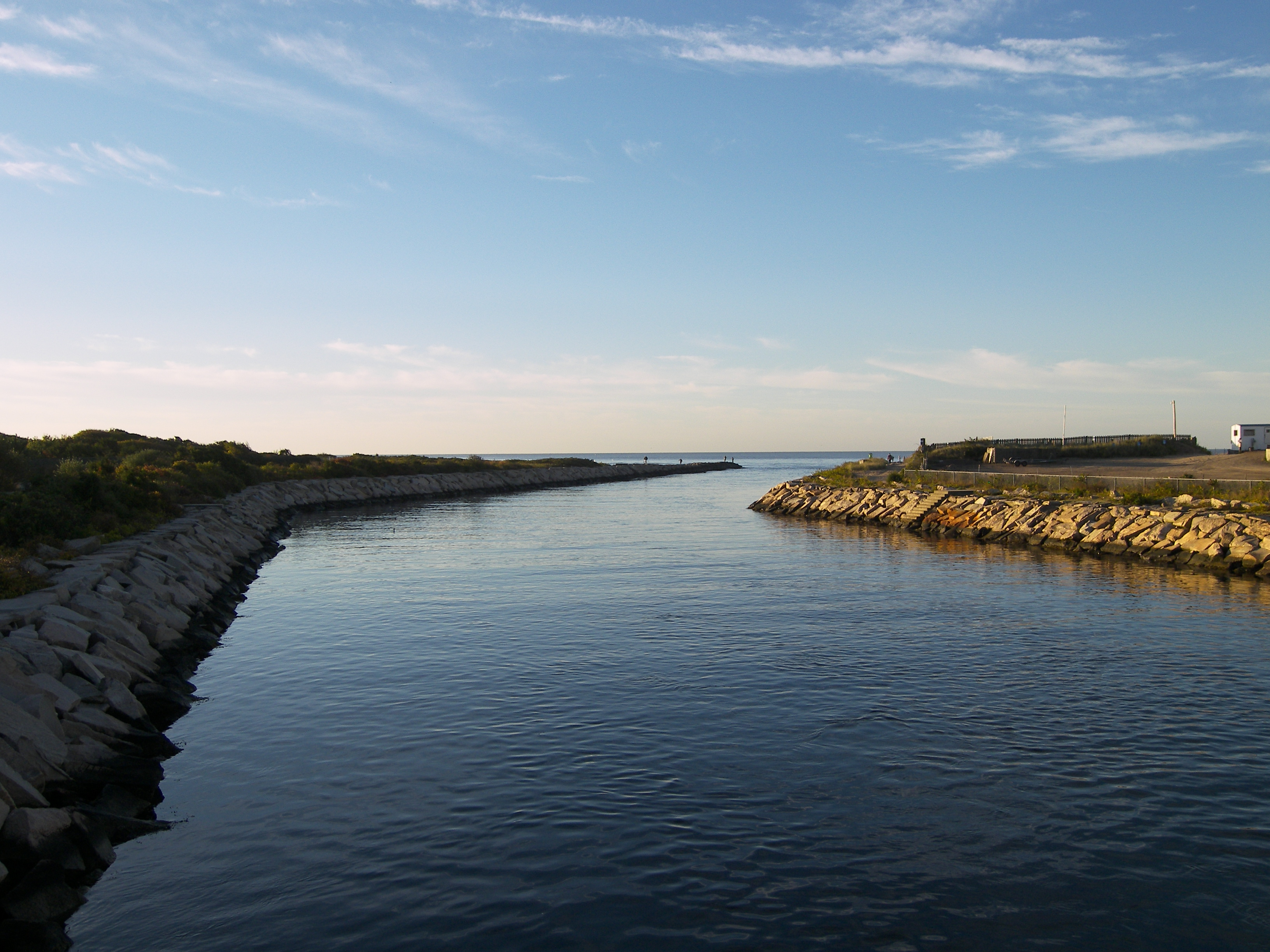
- Weekapaug Breachway looking south

- Location within Rhode Island
- Location: Westerly, Washington County, Rhode Island, United States
- Coordinates: 41.331767°N 71.786734°W
- Type: saline
- Basin countries: United States
- Max. length: 2.5 mi (4.0 km)
- Surface area: .7439 sq mi (1.927 km^{2})

Winnapaug Pond (also known as Brightman Pond) is a breached saltwater lagoon in Westerly, Rhode Island, United States, connected to Block Island Sound by the Weekapaug Breachway, which was constructed during the mid-1950s. The 2.5-mile (4.0 km) lake is separated from the Atlantic by a large sandbar. The Atlantic side of the sandbar is lined by beaches, including Misquamicut Beach, Atlantic Beach, and Westerly Town Beach. In 2010, its overall water quality was assessed as "good". Winnapaug is relatively small and shallow, and is favorable for kayaking. It is one of nine coastal lagoons, referred to as "salt ponds" by locals, in southern Rhode Island.
