= Cocumscussoc Association =

Nonprofit organization operating Smith's Castle in Rhode Island

- Established: August 9, 1948
- Type: 501(c)(3) nonprofit organization
- Tax ID no.: 05-0305722
- Location: 55 Richard Smith Drive, North Kingstown, Rhode Island, U.S.
- Coordinates: 41°35′00″N 71°27′16″W
- Origins: Formed to acquire and preserve Smith's Castle after it was threatened with demolition
- Services: Museum operations, tours, and events
- Main organ: Castle Chronicle
- Website: https://www.smithscastle.org

The Cocumscussoc Association is a nonprofit organization based in North Kingstown, Rhode Island, that owns and operates the Smith's Castle property as a publicly accessible historic site. In addition to operating the house as a museum, the Association manages the surrounding grounds, including the National Historic Landmark-designated Cocumscussoc archaeological site, colonial-era gardens, and a King Philip's War memorial, across roughly 22 acres.

== History ==
In 1940, the Providence-based Vesta Underwear Company, which held loans secured against the property, took possession of Smith's Castle after the Fox family fell behind on payments; the house then stood vacant and at risk of collapse for several years while the company sold off surrounding parcels. Vesta sold the remaining land and house to John A. Lawson in 1947.

A group of local citizens then organized to save the property, and the Cocumscussoc Association was incorporated on August 9, 1948. Within a month the Association secured an option to purchase the house and remaining two acres of land from Lawson for $13,000 after a fundraising drive. The founding trustees were Norman B. Smith, Arthur B. Lisle, Joseph W. Greene Jr., William Green Roelker, John Hutchins Cady, Mary S. Whitford, and Adelaide B. Viall, with Smith serving as the first president. Cady, a Providence architect and architectural historian, went on to supervise the Association's 1951–1956 restoration of the house. The Association opened the house to the public as a museum in the early 1950s and by 1991 held approximately 22 acres of the original property, including Rabbit Island.

== Activities and governance ==
The Association's 1948 bylaws describe its purpose as acquiring, restoring, and maintaining the property historically known as the Richard Smith Blockhouse for public education and as an example of early Rhode Island architecture. In 1999 the Association adopted a supplementary vision statement committing to teach Rhode Island history through three eras represented at the site: the Native American period, the early colonial period, and the plantation era.

The Association operates Smith's Castle as a seasonal museum with guided tours and maintains recreated colonial-era gardens on the grounds. The grounds also include a monument marking the burial site of colonial militiamen killed during King Philip's War. It hosts recurring public events including lectures and seasonal festivals.

The Association is governed by a volunteer board of trustees. It has been recognized by the Internal Revenue Service as tax-exempt under section 501(c)(3) since January 1950. The Association relies substantially on volunteers—including docents, greeters, and trustees—for its operations and events. As of its 2024 filing, it held net assets of roughly $1.6 million.

== See also ==
- Smith's Castle
- Cocumscussoc
