= Cocumscussoc =

River in Rhode Island

Coordinates: 41.581°N 71.473°W

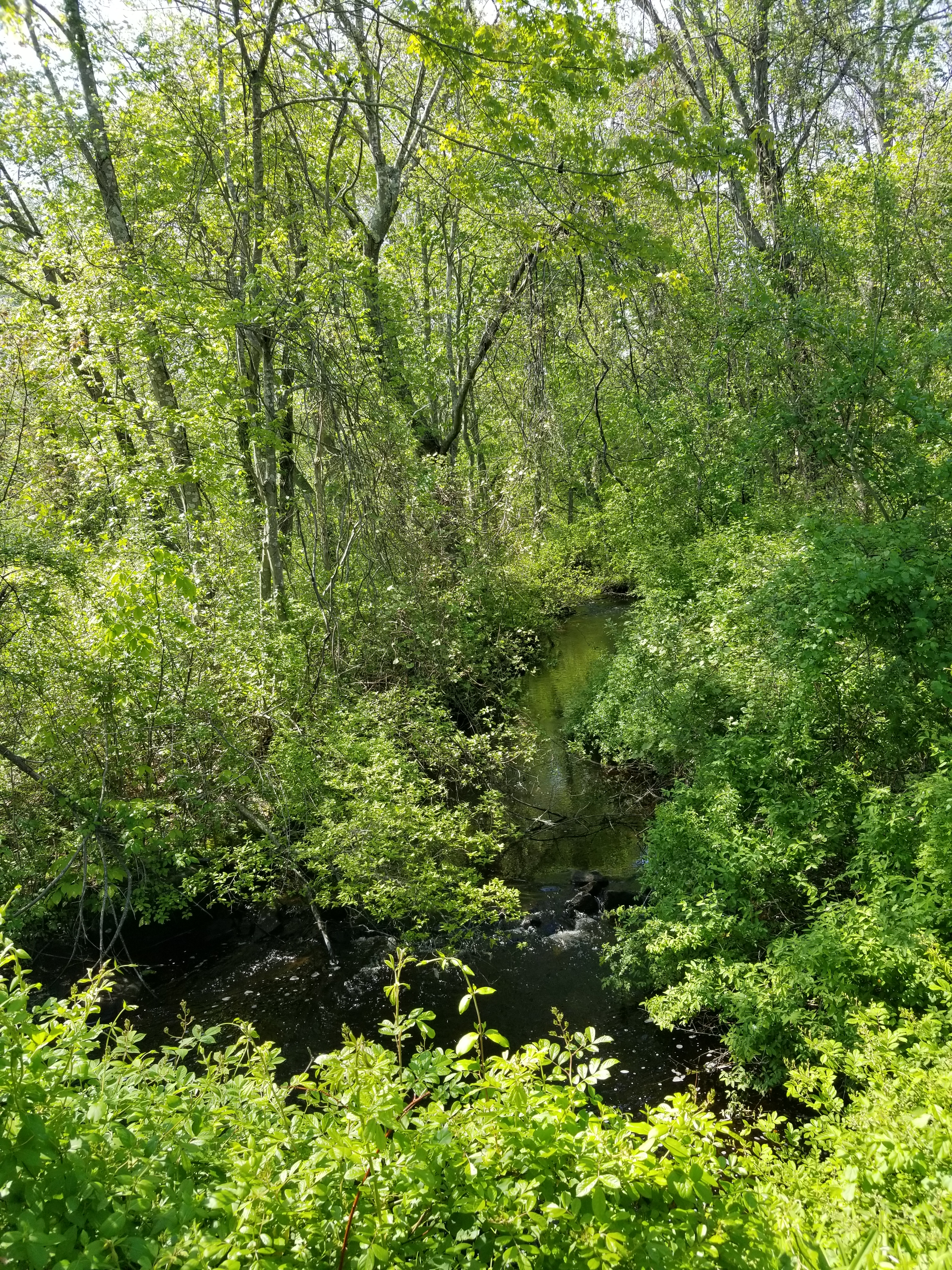
Cocumscussoc Brook near Smith's Castle

Cocumscussoc is a brook and surrounding region in Wickford, Rhode Island. The Cocumscussoc Brook flows into Mill Cove off of Wickford Harbor. Roger Williams started a trading post with the Narragansett people in the 1630s, likely northeast of the brook and harbor. The exact location of Williams' trading post is not known, but Smith's Castle (1678) was located nearby. This homestead was originally a fortified house and trading post of Richard Smith. Female sachem Quaiapen lived near Cocumscussoc and was associated with nearby Queen's Fort after inheriting her husband's lands in 1657. Most of Cocumscussoc was used for agriculture, though the last dairy farm closed in 1948. The creation of a railroad in the 1800s and the expansion of Route 1 greatly altered the course of Cocumscussoc Brook. Today Cocumscussoc State Park preserves much of the land surrounding Cocumscussoc Brook.
