= F. Burge Griswold =

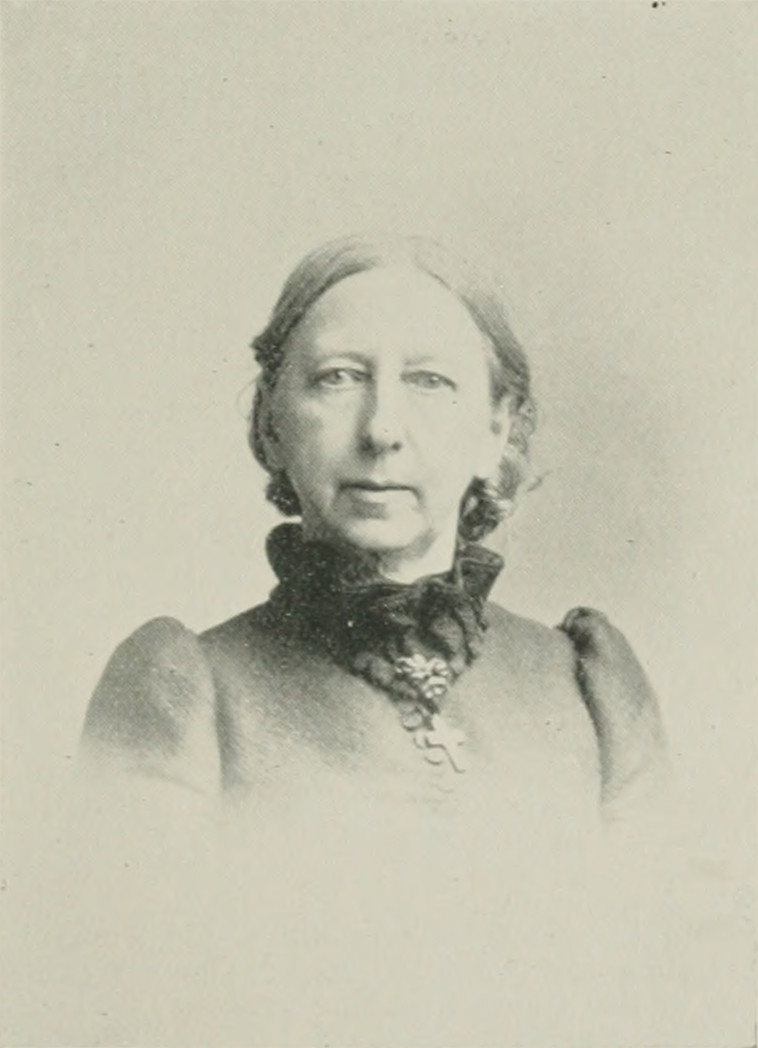
- Photo in A Woman of the Century
- Born: Frances Irene Burge; April 28, 1826; Wickford, Rhode Island, U.S.
- Died: November 11, 1900 (aged 74); Wickford, Rhode Island, U.S.
- Occupation: author
- Spouse(s): Allen N. Smith, Elias Griswold (m. 1885)
- Relatives: Roger Williams, Samuel Cranston, William Brenton, Jahleel Brenton
- Writing career
- Pen name: F. Burge Smith; Mrs. S. B. Phelps; Fan-Fan
- Genre: short stories
- Subject: religion
- Notable works: Bishop and Nanette series, Miriam's Reward, Fan-Fan Stories, Asleep

F. Burge Griswold (née, Burge; after first marriage, Smith; after second marriage, Griswold; pen names, F. Burge Smith, Mrs. S. B. Phelps, Fan-Fan; April 28, 1826 – November 11, 1900) was a 19th-century American author. She wrote Sunday school tales and other semi-religious works, among which were Bishop and Nanette series, and Miriam's Reward. Other popular writings were the Fan-Fan Stories and Asleep.

== Early life and family ==
Frances Irene Burge was born in Wickford, Rhode Island, April 28, 1826. She was a daughter of Rev. Lemuel Burge and Elizabeth Frances Shaw. She grew up in the St Paul's Narragansett Church, of which her father was for 20 years the rector, having thrice been elected to that pastorate. Griswold descended, on her father's side, from the Mucklestons of Muckleston Manor, Oswestry, and on her mother's side, from the Brentons of Hammersmith, England. She was a descendant of Roger Williams, Governor Samuel Cranston, and Governor William Brenton, and collaterally related to Admiral Jahleel Brenton, of the British Navy.

== Career ==
Griswold began to publish her literary work in 1853, and, by 1893, had published 32 volumes, besides innumerable fugitive articles for newspapers and other periodicals. Perhaps the most widely known of her books are the Bishop and Nanette series, which, as a carefully prepared exposition of the Book of Common Prayer, were used in advanced classes of Episcopal Sunday schools; Sister Eleanor's Brood, a story of the lights and shadows of a country clergyman's family life, in which the gentle, optimistic nature of the author works is used, and which is understood to figure, under a thin veil of fiction, the actual experience of her mother, and the third book, Asleep, addressing bereavement. Griswold was an ardent Episcopalian, and the church was always important to her. Her Christmas and Easter poems represented her most finished poetic work.

== Personal life ==
Griswold married twice. After the death of her first husband, Allen N. Smith, of Stockbridge, Massachusetts, she married, in 1885, one of her distant relatives, Judge Elias Griswold, of Maryland (or of Washington). Her last book, entitled Old Wickford, the Venice of America, was published this year by The Young Churchman Company, of Milwaukee.

Judge Griswold passed the latter days of his life in Brooklyn, New York, the home through many years of Mrs. Griswold's family, where she continued to reside. Most of her books were written under the name of "F. Burge Smith", and some under "Mrs. S. B. Phelps", though her favored pen name was "Fan-Fan". She died at Wickford, on Sunday, November 11, 1900.

== Selected works ==
- Miriam's Reward
- Elm tree tales, 1856
- Nina : or, Life's caprices : a story founded upon fact, 1861
- Asleep, 1871
- Sister Eleanor's brood, 1872
- The bishop and Nannette, 1874
- Asleep; words of comfort to the bereaved, 1876
- Old Wickford : the Venice of America, 1900
