= Rabbit Island (Rhode Island) =

Coordinates: 41°34′50″N 71°27′14″W

Rabbitt Island is a small island in Wickford Harbor, Narragansett Bay, Wickford, Rhode Island. Roger Williams received the island from Chief Canonicus' wife as a gift for a place to raise his goats. Richard Smith, who built Smith's Castle, later owned the island.
