= St. Paul's Church (North Kingstown, Rhode Island) =

Historic church in Rhode Island, United States

- U.S. National Register of Historic Places
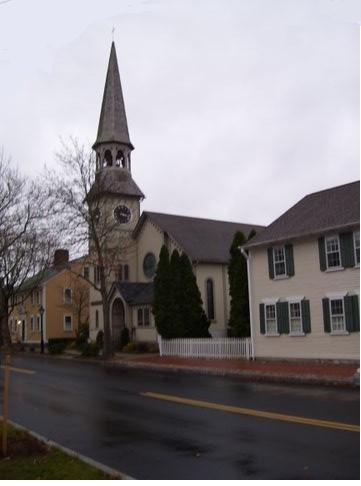

- Location within Rhode Island Location within the United States
- Location: North Kingstown, Rhode Island
- Coordinates: 41°34′17″N 71°27′1″W
- Built: 1847
- Architect: Thomas A. Tefft
- Architectural style: Romanesque
- NRHP reference No.: 72000009
- Added to NRHP: June 30, 1972

St. Paul's Church is an historic church at 55 Main Street in the village of Wickford within the town of North Kingstown, Rhode Island, United States. It is a single-story Romanesque Revival structure, designed by Rhode Island architect Thomas Tefft and built in 1847. Its main rectangular block has a gable roof, and narrow round-arch windows on the side walls with molded surrounds. The front of the church is asymmetrical, with the tower on the left and its entry slightly off-center between the tower and a small projecting narthex area. The square tower has single, narrow, round-arch windows on the first level, paired round-arch windows on the second, and clock faces on the third. A roof skirt rises to an open octagonal belfry, which is capped by a steeple and spire.

The church was listed on the National Register of Historic Places in 1972.

== See also ==
- Old Narragansett Church, also sometimes called St. Paul's
- National Register of Historic Places listings in Washington County, Rhode Island
