= John Cady =

John Cady may refer to:

- John W. Cady (1790–1854), U.S. Representative from New York
- John Cady (golfer) (1866–1933), American golfer
- John Hutchins Cady (1881–1967), American architect and author
