= James MacSparran =

Irish-born Anglican clergyman (1693-1757)

- portrait by John Smibert
- Born: 1693
- Died: 1757 (aged 63–64)
- Occupation: Minister
- Spouse(s): Hannah Gardiner MacSparran

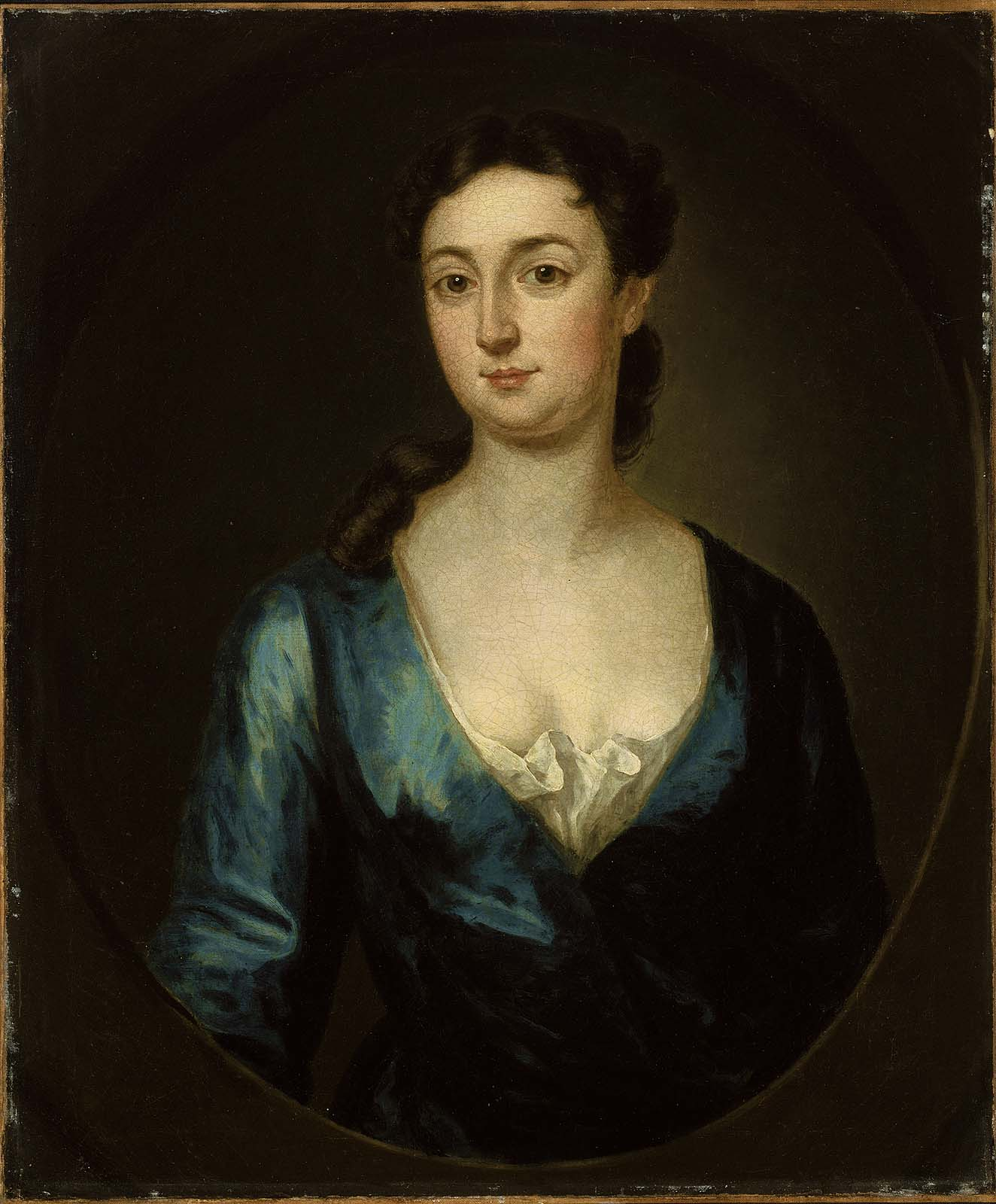
Hannah Gardiner MacSparran, portrait by John Smibert

James MacSparran (10 September 1693 – 5 December 1757) was an Irish-born American Anglican clergyman, writer, diarist, and slaveowner.

== Biography ==
=== Early life ===
James MacSparran was born at Dungiven, co. Deny, and received his education at the University of Glasgow, where he was admitted M.A. on 5 March 1709. He appears to have been brought up as a Presbyterian, but having, as he says, been afflicted and abused by a false charge in his youth he was induced to become an Anglican clergyman in 1720, and in 1721 was sent by the Society for the Propagation of the Gospel in Foreign Parts as a missionary to Narragansett, Rhode Island. On 22 May 1722 he married Hannah, daughter of William Gardiner of Boston Neck, Narragansett.

=== Career ===
He was minister of St. Paul's Church there for thirty-six years. Furthermore, he was also instrumental in erecting the church at New London in 1725, and occasionally preached there. When in 1729 Dean (afterwards Bishop) George Berkeley and the portrait-painter John Smibert, F.S.A., arrived at Rhode Island, they made a lengthened stay with MacSparran, and Smibert painted the portraits of both him and his wife. (The portraits are currently owned by the Bowdoin College Museum of Art and the Museum of Fine Arts, Boston, respectively.) The climate did not agree with MacSparran, and he was besides involved in a lawsuit with the non- conformists about glebe land which lasted for twenty-eight years. In June 1736 he went to England for a year.

On 4 Aug 1751 MacSparran preached at St. Paul's Church, Narragansett, a sermon on the 'Sacred Dignity of the Christian Priesthood vindicated,' which he afterwards had printed at Newport, Rhode Island. The object of his discourse was to correct sundry irregularities which had crept into the worship of the English church in America; but the congregational clergy chose to understand it as directed against themselves, and some vigorous pamphleteering ensued, in which, however, MacSparran declined to take part. In 1752 the lawsuit, on which MacSparran expended at least 600 pounds, ended in favour of the 'independent teacher,' The Bishop of London condoled with him on the loss of a cause 'so just on the church's side,' and hinted that there would be no difficulty in making him bishop of Rhode Island were he so inclined. MacSparran accordingly went to England in the autumn of 1754, accompanied by his wife; but the death of his wife induced him to return to America in February 1756 without becoming a bishop. 'He had rather dwell,' he said, 'in the hearts of his parishioners than wear all the bishop's gowns in the world.' He longed in reality for preferment in Ireland, for which he knew himself to be peculiarly well qualified, as he could read and write, and upon occasion preach, in Irish. The University of Oxford, to mark their appreciation of the sacrifices which he had made in resisting the dissenters, conferred on him the degree of D.D. on 5 April 1787.

His chief work is entitled America Dissected: being a Full and True Account of the American Colonies, Dublin, 1753. It consists of three letters addressed respectively to the Hon. Colonel Henry Cary, his cousin the Rev. Paul Limrick, and William Stevenson, and was published to warn 'unsteady people' against emigrating to America on account of bad climate, bad money, danger from enemies, pestilent heresies, and the like. This curious work, which is among the scarcest of Americana, was reprinted in an appendix to Wilkins Updike's History of the Episcopal Church in Narragansett, New York City, 1847, with portraits of MacSparran and his wife. MacSparran likewise published several sermons, which are also very scarce. He contemplated printing an extended history of the colonies, especially of New England, but of this no trace could be found among his papers.

== Death ==
MacSparran died at his house in South Kingston, Rhode Island, on 1 Dec 1757, and was buried on 6 Dec under the altar of St. Paul's Church, North Kingstown. The church was moved to Wickford in the year 1800 and the site of the church is now known as the Platform Cemetery on Shermantown Road. There is an obelisk marking MacSparran's grave. His wife died in London of smallpox on 24 June 1755, and was buried in Broadway Chapel burying-yard in Westminster, leaving no issue.

He was inducted into the Rhode Island Heritage Hall of Fame in 1998.

This article incorporates text from a publication now in the public domain: "Macsparran, James". Dictionary of National Biography. London: Smith, Elder & Co. 1885–1900.
