= Old Narragansett Church =

Historic church in Rhode Island, United States

- U.S. National Register of Historic Places
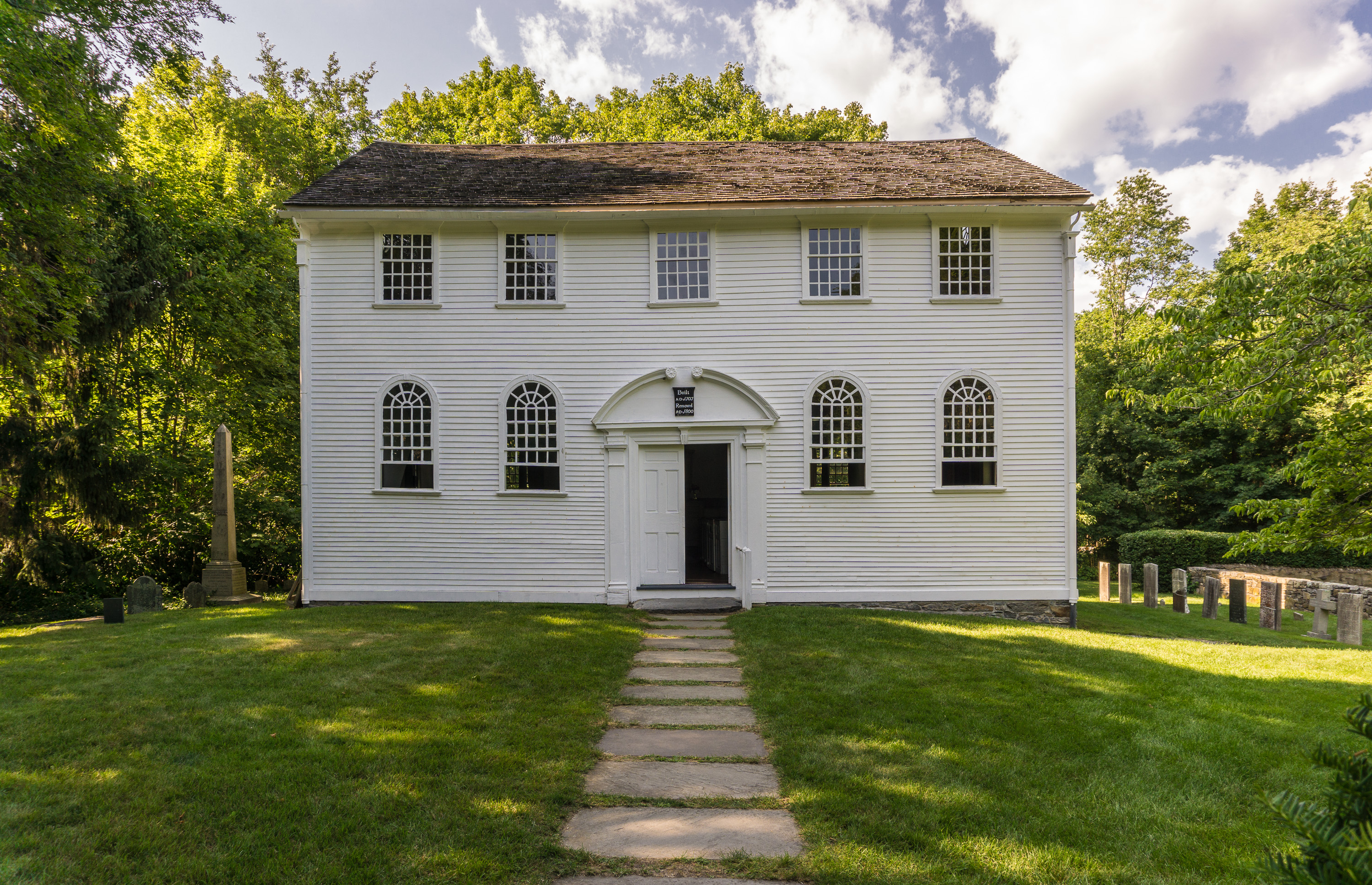
- Old Narragansett Church in 2015

- Location within Rhode Island Location within the United States
- Location: North Kingstown, Rhode Island
- Coordinates: 41°34′21″N 71°26′59″W
- Built: 1707
- NRHP reference No.: 73000009
- Added to NRHP: July 2, 1973

Old Narragansett Church (also known as Old St. Paul's Church and St. Paul's Episcopal Church) is a historic Episcopal church located at 60 Church Lane in Wickford, Rhode Island, believed to be the oldest Episcopal church building in the Northeastern United States.

== History ==
The church congregation was founded in 1706 as St. Paul's Church and was established by the Society for the Propagation of the Gospel in Foreign Parts (SPG). The original congregation consisted of 17 landholder families. The rector of the church for 36 years was The Reverend James MacSparran from 1721 until his death in 1757. The Rev. Samuel Fayerweather closed the church in 1774 due to the American Revolutionary War, and in 1780 the SPG withdrew its support for Fayerweather because of his support for the American cause.

The church re-formed by the Rev. William Smith in 1787 after a thirteen-year hiatus. In 1799 the congregants voted to move the church to its present location in Wickford.

On April 11, 1756, the infant "son of Gilbert Stewart ye Snuff Grinder" was baptized in the church. The child later changed his name to Gilbert Stuart and grew up to be known as one of America's foremost portraitists.

== Building ==
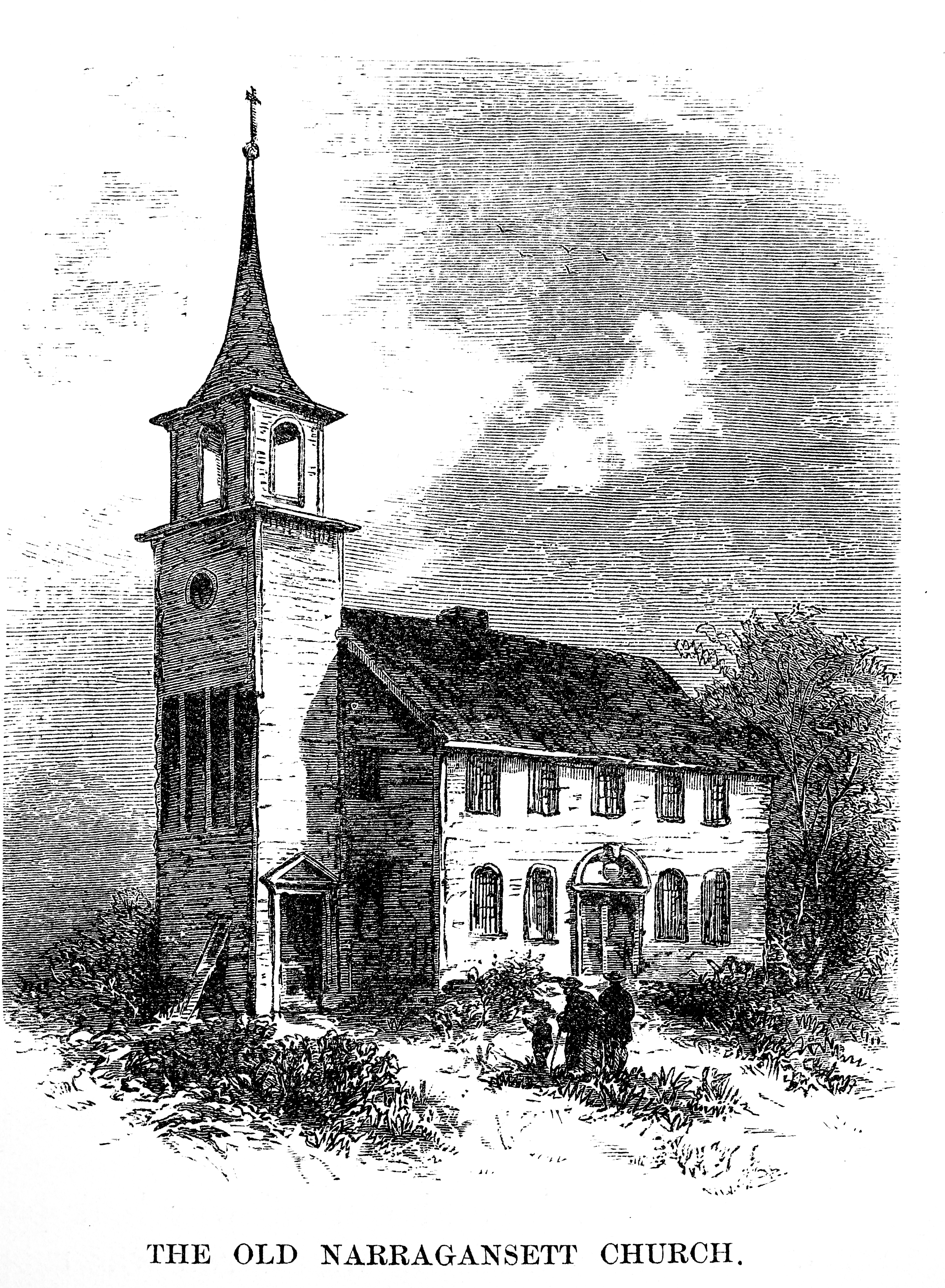
The church had a steeple from 1811 to 1846.

The church building was constructed in 1707, about five miles southwest of Wickford, on what is now Pendar Road. At the time, this road was expected to become the main route between Boston and New York, but this never came to pass. After some time the neighborhood became scarcely populated, and in 1800 the church was disassembled and moved to its current location.

The church contains box pews, a balcony, and an organ built in 1680 by Bernard Smith, which is among the oldest organs still used in services in the United States. The church had a steeple attached to its western end from 1811 to 1846, but the steeple was not strong enough to hold the swinging bell, and it collapsed.

The Episcopal Diocese of Rhode Island currently owns the building, and it is administered by a trust which has representatives of the modern Saint Paul's Church in Wickford. A more modern church building, known as St. Paul's Church, was built nearby in 1847. Currently the congregation of St. Paul's meets in the Old Narragansett Church during the summer months.

The church was added to the National Register of Historic Places in 1973 and has a small churchyard cemetery.

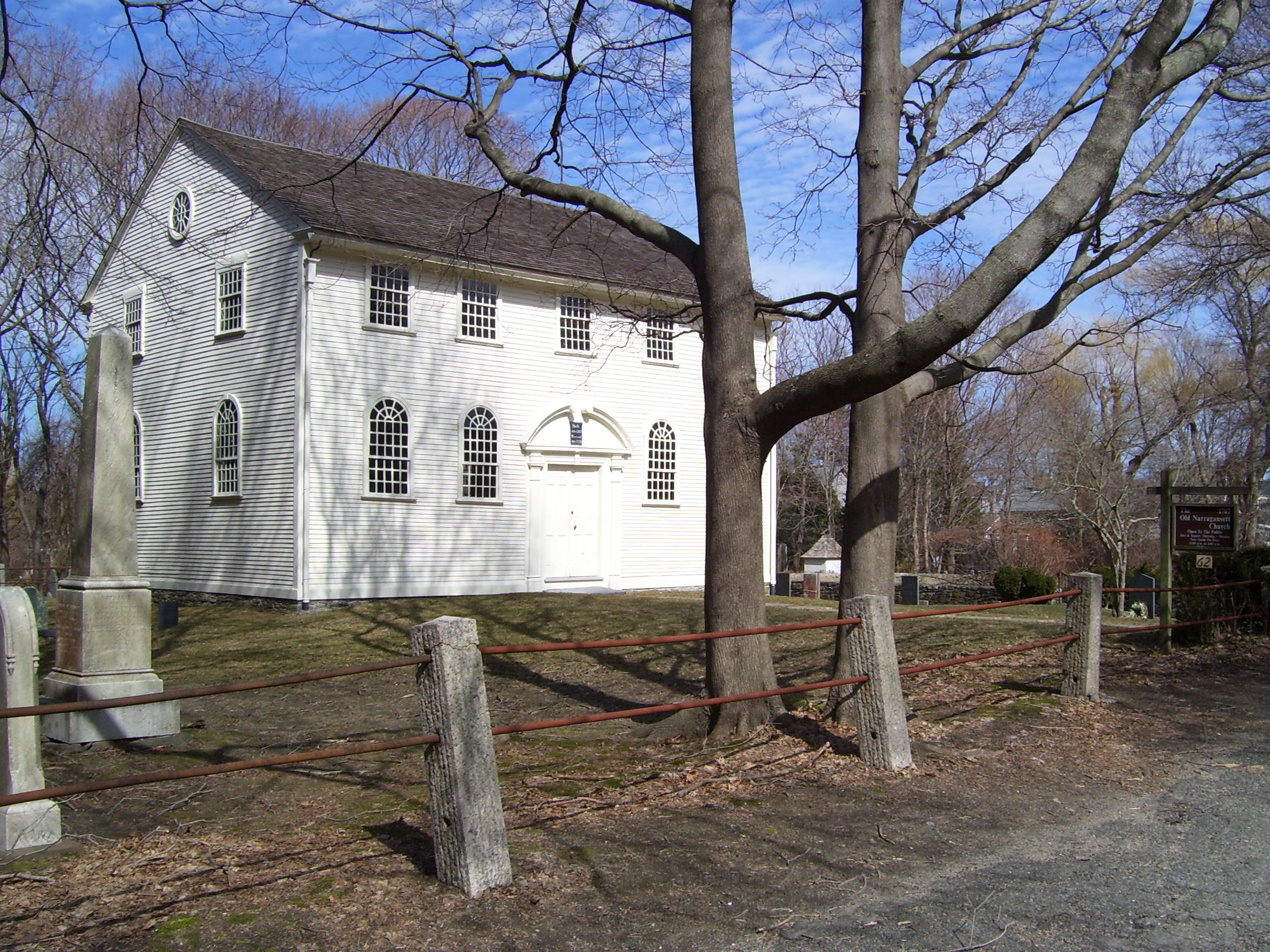
Old Narragansett Church in 2009

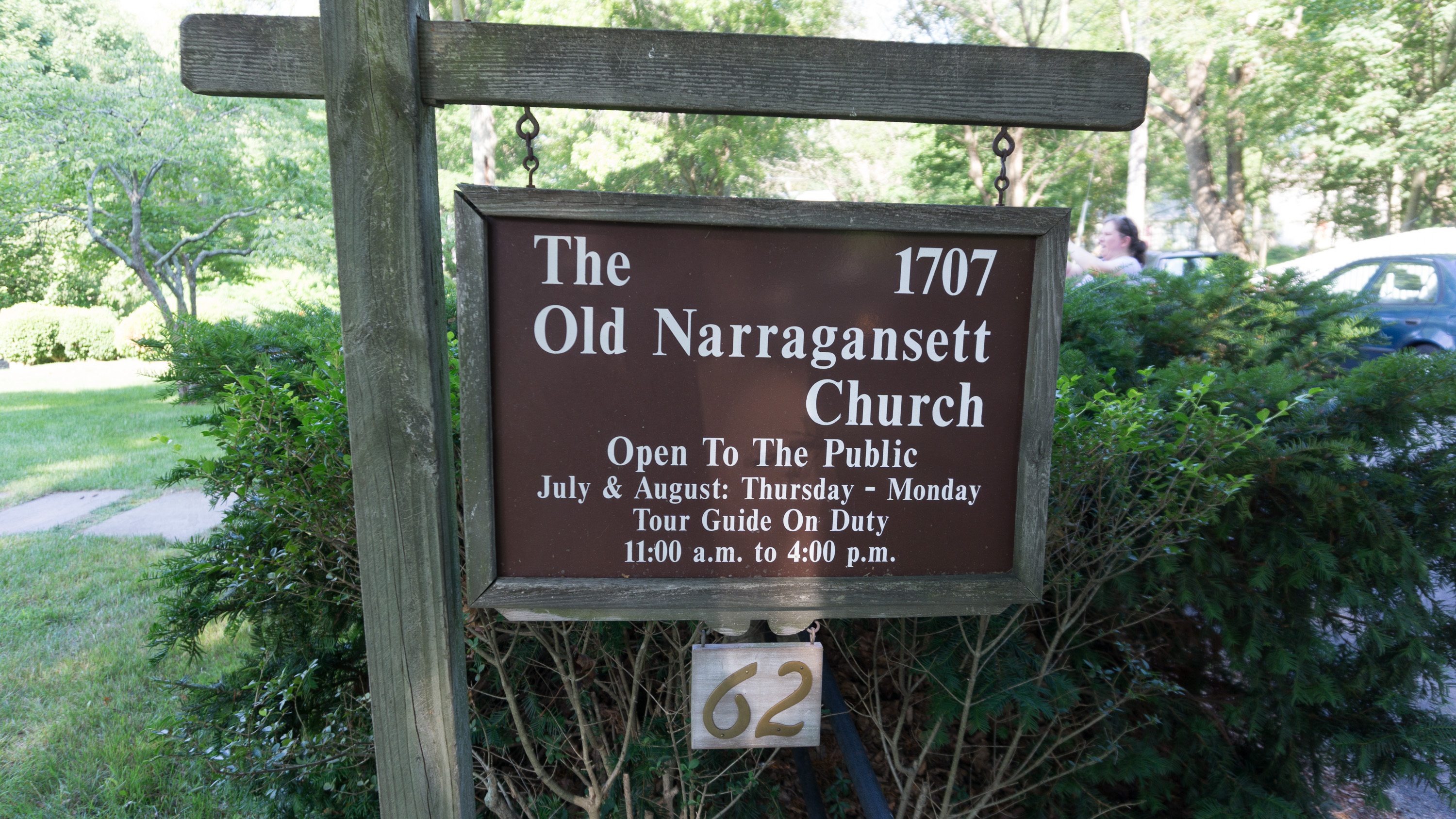
Sign

== See also ==
- St. Paul's Church (North Kingstown, Rhode Island)
- Oldest churches in the United States
- List of the oldest buildings in Rhode Island
- National Register of Historic Places listings in Washington County, Rhode Island
