= Smith's Castle =

Historic house in Rhode Island, US

- Cocumscussoc Archeological Site
- U.S. National Register of Historic Places
- U.S. National Historic Landmark
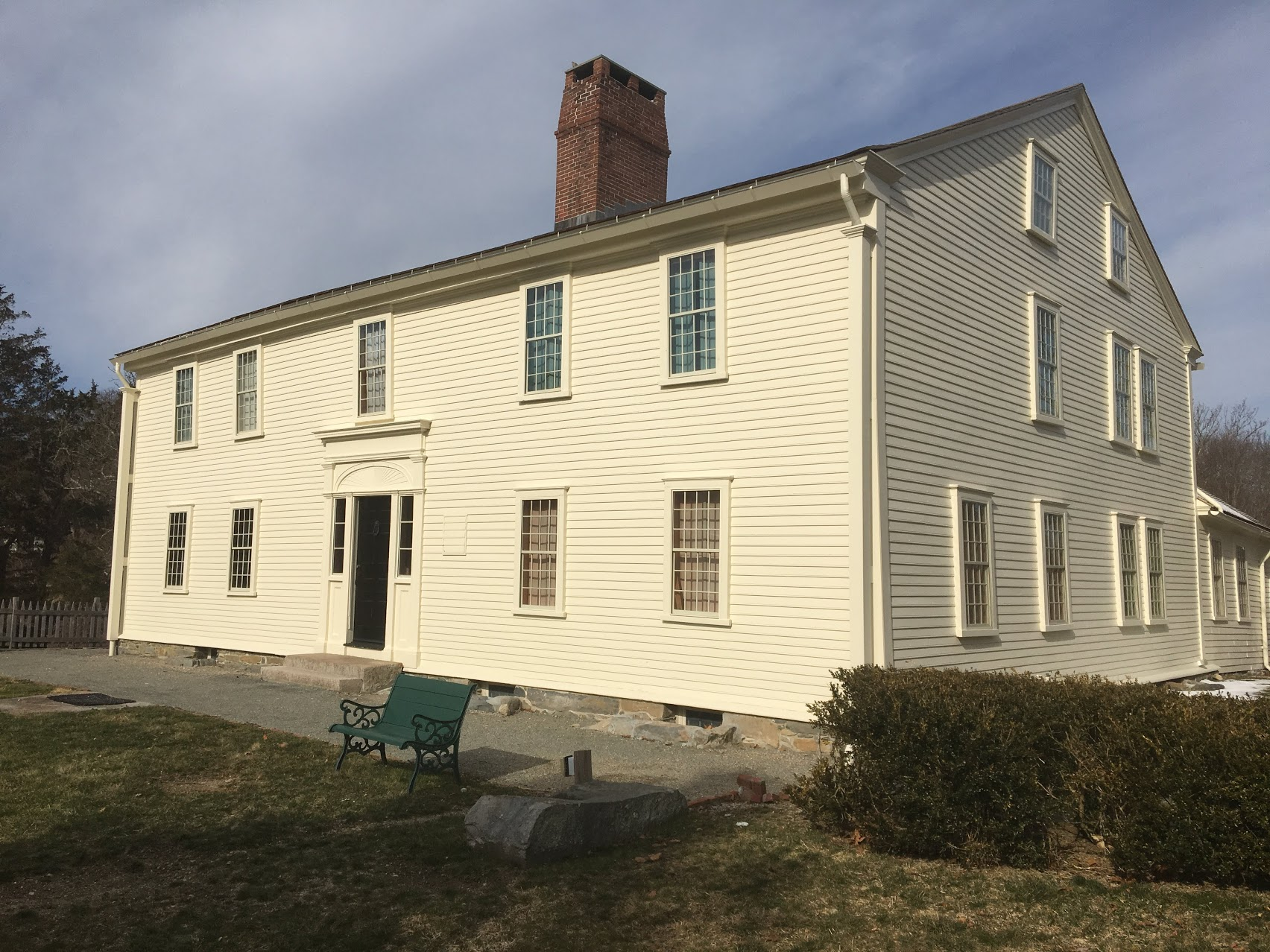
- Front elevation of Smith's Castle house, 2018
- Location: Wickford, RI
- Nearest city: Warwick
- Coordinates: 41°35′00″N 71°27′16″W
- Area: 10 acres (4.0 ha) (1972 NRHP nomination); 1.8 acres (0.73 ha) (1993 NHL nomination)
- Built: 1678 (house)
- Owner: Cocumscussoc Association
- Architectural style: Colonial
- NRHP reference No.: 72000010 (original); 93000605 (increase)

Significant dates
- Added to NRHP: February 23, 1972
- Boundary increase: April 12, 1993
- Designated NHL: April 12, 1993

Smith's Castle, built in 1678, is a house museum at 55 Richard Smith Drive, near Wickford, a village in North Kingstown, Rhode Island. Smith's Castle is one of the oldest houses in the state. It was designated a National Historic Landmark in 1993 as Cocumscussoc Archeological Site due to the artifacts and information that digs have yielded in the area. It is located just off U.S. Route 1 in Rhode Island.

== History ==
Smith's Castle was built in 1678 to replace an earlier structure which the Narragansett Tribe destroyed during King Philip's War. The land on which the house was built was known as Cocumscussoc (or Cocumscossoc) and was near the original site of Roger Williams' trading post. Williams was the founder of Providence Plantations and a prominent Baptist theologian. He built the trading post on the site in 1637 to trade with the Narragansetts after receiving the land from the tribe. Eventually, he sold the trading post to Smith to finance his trip to Great Britain to secure a charter for Rhode Island.

Richard Smith constructed a large house which was fortified, giving the house its nickname as a castle. His son Richard Smith Jr. inherited the plantation in 1666 and invited militias from Massachusetts and Connecticut to use the property during King Philip's War. The house was burned in retaliation for the Great Swamp Fight, and the present structure was built in its place, originally as a saltbox house, and later modified into its current form. Approximately 40 soldiers were buried on the property during King Philip's War. Additionally, the only incident of an individual being hanged, drawn, and quartered on American soil took place at Smith's Castle in 1676. Joshua Tefft, an English colonist found guilty of having fought on the side of the Narragansetts during the Great Swamp Fight, was executed by this method.

In 1683, Smith's Castle was the site of a royally appointed boundary commission to adjudicate ownership of the King's Province. Edward Cranfield, William Stoughton, Nathaniel Saltonstall, and a few others, met there to hear the arguments in favor of Connecticut Colony or Plymouth Colony ownership. Rhode Island boycotted the meeting and sent the militia to send them away.

Eventually, the property was transferred to the Updike, Congdon, and Fox families. Among the Updikes who lived there were Lodowick and Abigail Updike, whose daughter Sarah Updike Goddard and grandchildren Mary Katherine Goddard and William Goddard were all notable colonial-era printers and publishers. It was the site of a large dairy farm into the twentieth century until it became a museum. In the early twentieth century, preservationists Norman Isham and John Hutchins Cady stabilized the house and performed several minor restorations.

A slab table belonging to Lodowick Updike is currently in the Newport Restoration Foundation in Newport, Rhode Island. The table was possibly made by John Goddard in the 1760s at Goddard and Townsend.

== See also ==
- List of the oldest buildings in Rhode Island
- List of National Historic Landmarks in Rhode Island
- National Register of Historic Places listings in Washington County, Rhode Island

== Images ==
Smith's Castle from an 1882 drawing

Smith's Castle in a turn of the 20th century postcard

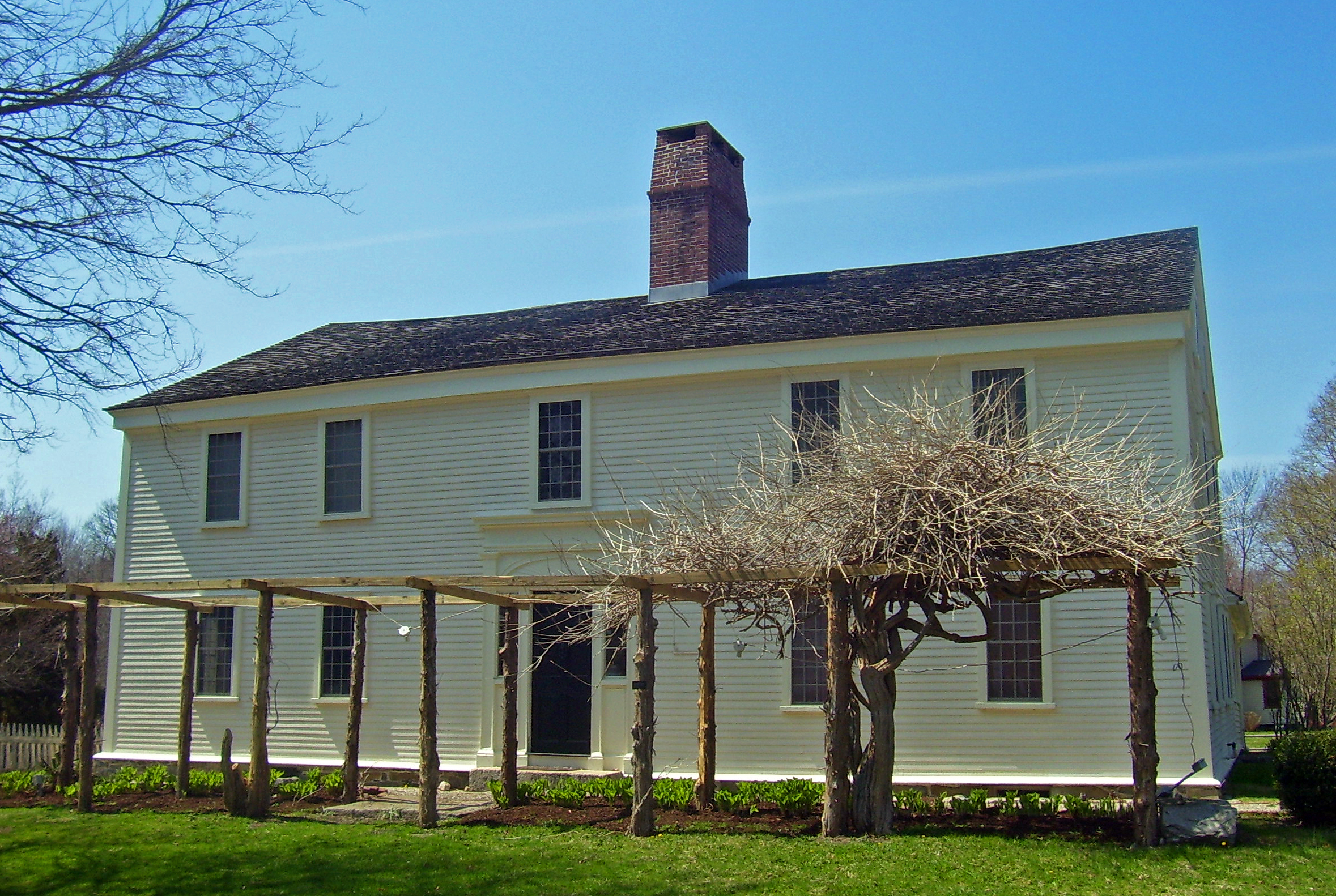
Smith's Castle in 2008

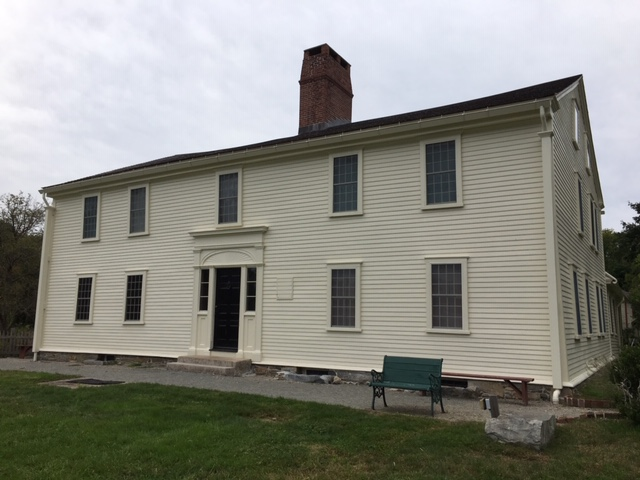
Smith's Castle in 2018

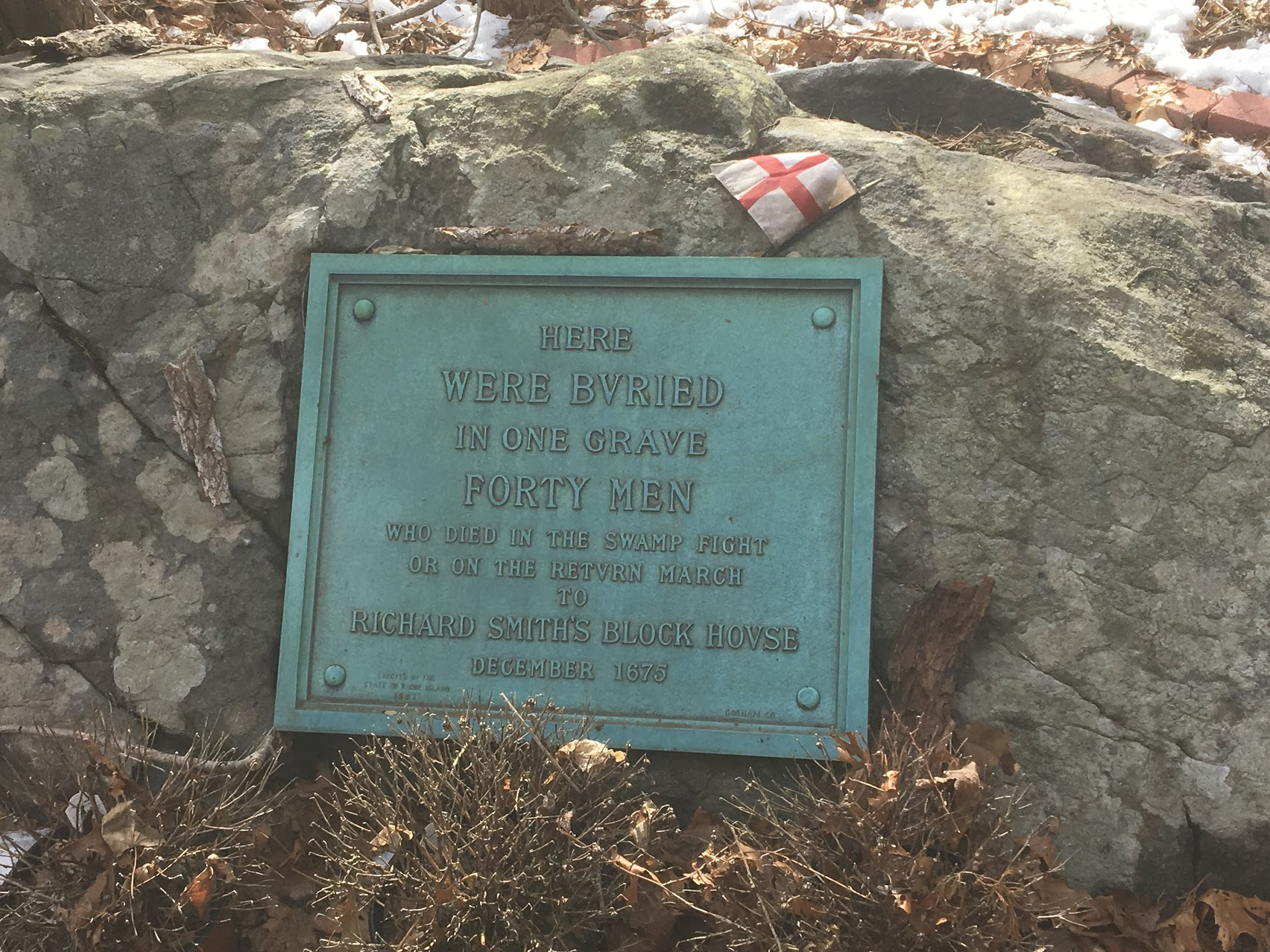
Mass grave of forty unnamed men who died in the Great Swamp Fight or on the return march in December 1675
