= Richard Smith (settler) =

- Born: c. 1596; Gloucestershire, England
- Died: 1666; Wickford, Rhode Island
- Spouse: (name unknown)
- Children: Richard, James, Elizabeth, Joan, Katharine

Richard Smith (c. 1596–1666) was the first European settler in the Narragansett country (later Washington County, Rhode Island) in the Colony of Rhode Island and Providence Plantations. He established a trading post on the western side of the Narragansett Bay at a place called Cocumscussoc which became the village of Wickford in modern-day North Kingstown, Rhode Island.

Smith had his establishment in the Narragansett lands which were highly contested by several colonies, and he wanted his properties to fall under the jurisdiction of the Connecticut Colony. Conflicting claims to the area resulted in it being put directly under the governance of the English crown and being called King's Province for a while, but this still didn't end the disputes. It wasn't until 1726 when the Narragansett lands were put under the governance of the Rhode Island colony by royal decree.

Smith's neighbor, colony co-founder Roger Williams, remembered him very fondly in a deposition that he made many years after Smith's death, in spite of their strong difference of views concerning Connecticut's authority over the land, and this testimony suggests that Smith had lived a good, earnest, and peaceful life.

== Life ==
Richard Smith had come from Gloucestershire in England, according to Colony of Rhode Island and Providence Plantations co-founder Roger Williams, where "he left a fair possession" because of his "conscience toward God." He arrived in New England at an unknown date, where he settled for a while in Taunton in the Plymouth Colony, but soon established a trading post on the western side of the Narragansett Bay, the year being about 1637 by Williams' recollection, but Francis Brinley puts the year closer to 1641. Here he built the first English house among the native Narragansett people, and though destroyed during King Philip's War, another was built by his son, Richard Jr., at the same location, and continues to stand as a local landmark called Smith's Castle. Smith employed Narragansett workers including stone mason, Stonewall John. Within a few years, by 1645, Roger Williams left Providence and built another trading post about a mile north of Smith's establishment, along the main road, called the Pequot Path or Post Road. This main road connected the New York colony to Boston, and all travelers along the road passed Smith's and Williams' trading houses. Williams remained in the area until 1651, when he sold his property to Smith to generate funds for his proposed trip to England.

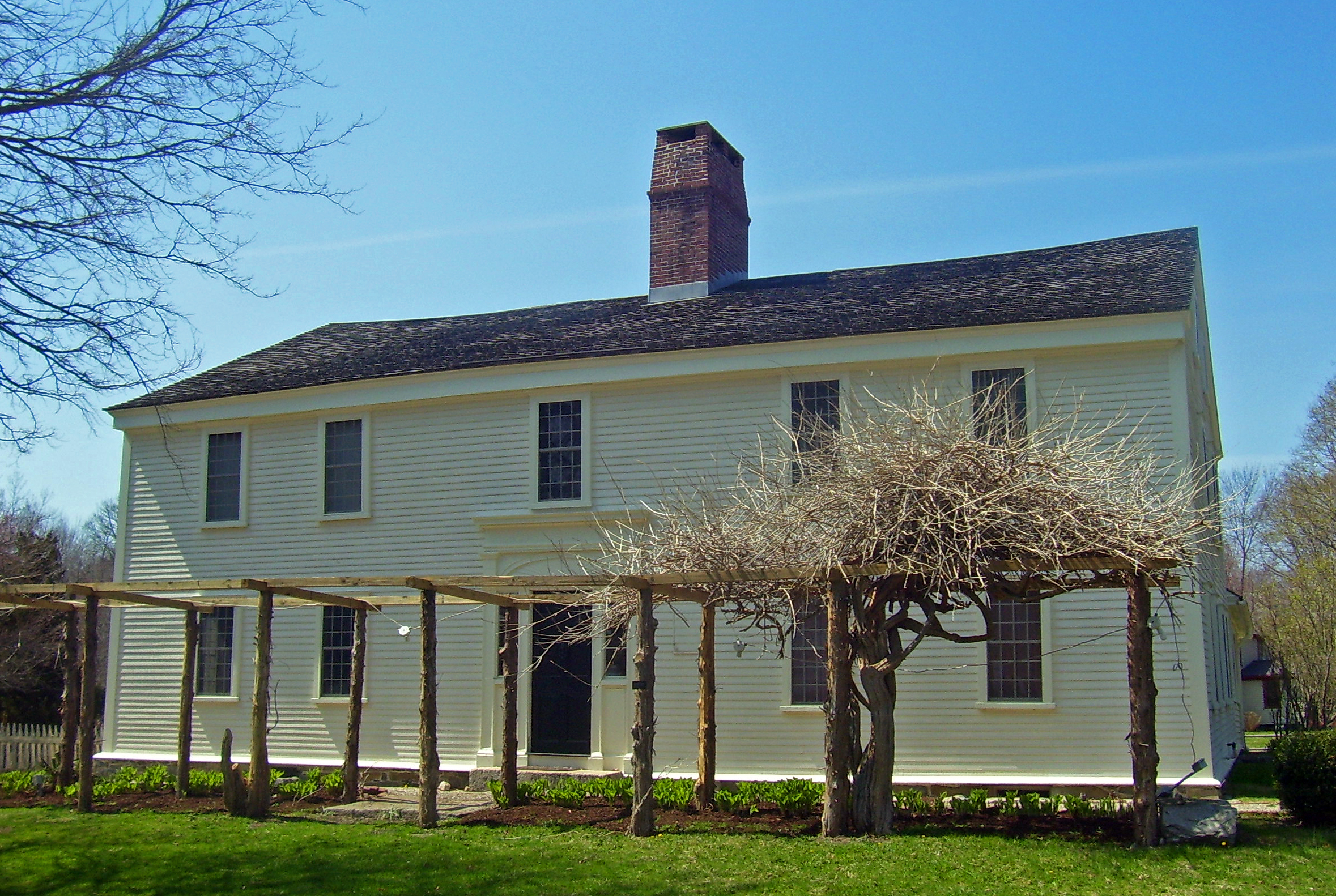
Smith's Castle, home of Richard Smith Jr., and the site where Richard Sr. first built his original house

As Roger Williams later related, the wilderness arrangement in which Smith lived was suitable to him for being "instrumental under God in propagating the gospel among the natives, who knew not God as they ought to know him," and Smith took great pains in this regard until his dying day. Until Williams built his trading post nearby, the closest English settlers to where Smith built his home were at Pawtuxet, nearly 20 miles away.

Beginning in the 1650s, Smith, now with extensive land holdings, sought to have his lands put under the jurisdiction of either the Plymouth Colony or the Connecticut Colony. The lands on the west side of the Narragansett Bay were in dispute, and would continue to be for more than half a century. Smith owned an island in the bay called Hog Island, and in 1659 sought to put it under Plymouth jurisdiction, but not without reaction from the Rhode Island General Assembly. In 1663 an agreement had been brokered by John Clarke of Rhode Island and Governor John Winthrop of Connecticut. Members of the Atherton Company, which had extensive land holdings in the Narragansett country, were asked under whose jurisdiction they chose to be, and they promptly decided on Connecticut. This was accepted, and Richard Smith Sr., Edward Hutchinson, and John Hewes were made selectmen and Richard Smith Jr. became constable. Public business was conducted at Smith's trading house, and the settlement was given the name of Wickford. Clarke and Winthrop agreed that other than this settlement, the western boundary of Rhode Island's claim to the territory would be the Pequot River, where the State of Rhode Island would eventually have its western boundary.

There were so many parties interested in the valuable Narragansett lands, that the fragile agreement made by Clarke and Winthrop did not hold, and disputes leading into violence erupted. The Crown, tired of dealing with the constant claims and counter claims, turned the Narragansett country into a separate royal province known as King's Province in March 1665. This lasted until King Philip's War, when the territorial battle resumed once again, and it wasn't until 1726 (by royal decree) that the Narragansett lands were ultimately put into the hands of the Rhode Island colony, as spelled out in its Royal Charter of 1663.

Smith wrote his will in 1664, and it was proven in late 1666. Following his death, Roger Williams described Smith as "coming and going, himself, children, and servants; and he had quiet possessions of his housing, land and meadows, and there in his own house, with much serenity of soul and comfort, he yielded up his spirit to God (the Father of spirits) in peace."

== See also ==
- List of early settlers of Rhode Island
- Colony of Rhode Island and Providence Plantations
