= John Hutchins Cady =

American architect and historian (1881–1967)

John Hutchins Cady FAIA
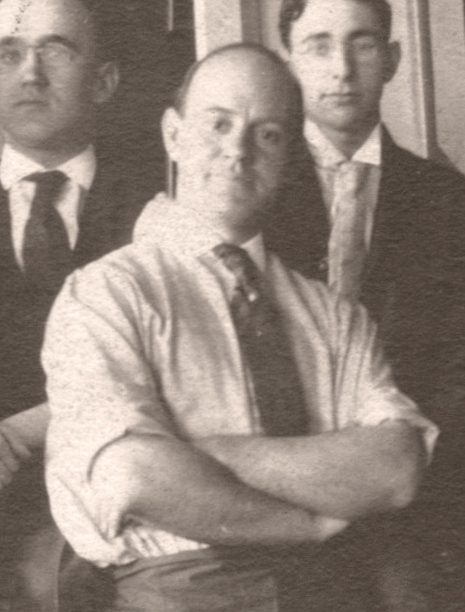
- Born: January 17, 1881; Providence, Rhode Island, U.S.
- Died: September 27, 1967 (aged 86); Providence, Rhode Island, U.S.
- Burial place: Swan Point Cemetery
- Education: Hope High School; Brown University Ph.B. (1903); Massachusetts Institute of Technology (1906)
- Relatives: Walter Guyton Cady (brother)

29th President of Rhode Island AIA
- In office 1943–1945
- Preceded by: Edwin E. Cull
- Succeeded by: Albert Harkness

Chairman of the City Plan Commission of Providence, Rhode Island
- In office February 27, 1929 – February 1, 1935
- Preceded by: Henry Ames Barker

19th President of Rhode Island AIA
- In office 1923–1925
- Preceded by: F. Ellis Jackson
- Succeeded by: Robert C. N. Monahan

John Hutchins Cady FAIA (January 17, 1881 – September 27, 1967) was an American architect, architectural historian, author, and historical preservationist in Rhode Island.

== Biography ==
Cady was born January 17, 1881, in Providence, Rhode Island. He was the youngest son of John Hamlin Cady of Providence, and Mary Tabitha Eddy, of Somerset, Massachusetts. His older brothers were Walter Guyton Cady and William H. Cady. Cady attended the University Grammar School and Hope High School before graduating from Brown University in 1903 with a Bachelor of Philosophy. He was President of his class of 1903 at Brown and member of Alpha Delta Phi.

Afterwards, he went to study architecture at the Massachusetts Institute of Technology and graduated in 1906. Cady worked for numerous architectural firms in the area during this period including Clarke & Howe (1904); Stone, Carpenter & Wilson (1905); Peabody & Stearns (1906–1907); Howells & Stokes (1907); and for a brief time, the Atelier Duquesne in Paris with Raymond Hood and F. Ellis Jackson. Cady returned to Providence in 1908 where he started his own architectural practice. He mainly designed private residences and performed restoration work. Cady was a disciple and admirer of Norman Isham's works, particularly his historic architecture and contributions to the historic preservation movement.

During World War I, Cady served with Battery A in the Rhode Island National Guard and attended a trancing school for Field Officers in 1918 at Camp Zachary Taylor. During World War II, Cady served on air raid shelter committees under the Providence Civilian Defense Council.

Cady served on the City Plan Commission of Providence starting in 1915 and was elected chairman following the death of Henry Ames Barker in 1929. He was reelected in 1933 and served until 1935. In 1934, Cady was appointed by the National Planning Board as Federal consultant of the new State Planning Board of Rhode Island, and later served as the Board's secretary. He was also a member of the Providence Housing Association, serving as its president in 1943.

Cady died September 27, 1967, at the Rhode Island Hospital in Providence. He was buried at Swan Point Cemetery.

== Memberships and awards ==
Cady became member of the American Institute of Architects in 1912 and was elected a Fellow in 1937. Cady served twice as the president of the Rhode Island Chapter from 1923 to 1925 and from 1943 to 1945. Cady was also an active member of numerous other societies, clubs, and associations throughout his life including:

- American Planning and Civic Association
- Appalachian Mountain Club (served as the chairman for Rhode Island)
- English-Speaking Union
- National Trust for History Preservation
- Providence Preservation Society
- Public Park Association
- Rhode Island Historical Society
- Society for the Preservation of New England Antiquities
- Society of Architectural Historians
- Society of Colonial Wars
- Society of Technology Architects
- World Affairs Council

Cady served as president of the Board of Directors of the Proprietors of Swan Point Cemetery for 33 years. He also served as secretary of The Players of Providence for 16 years and was on the Board of Managers for 21 years. Cady received an honorary Doctor of Fine Arts (D.F.A.) from Brown University in 1958 and was awarded the Providence Art Club Medal in June 1963.

== Works ==
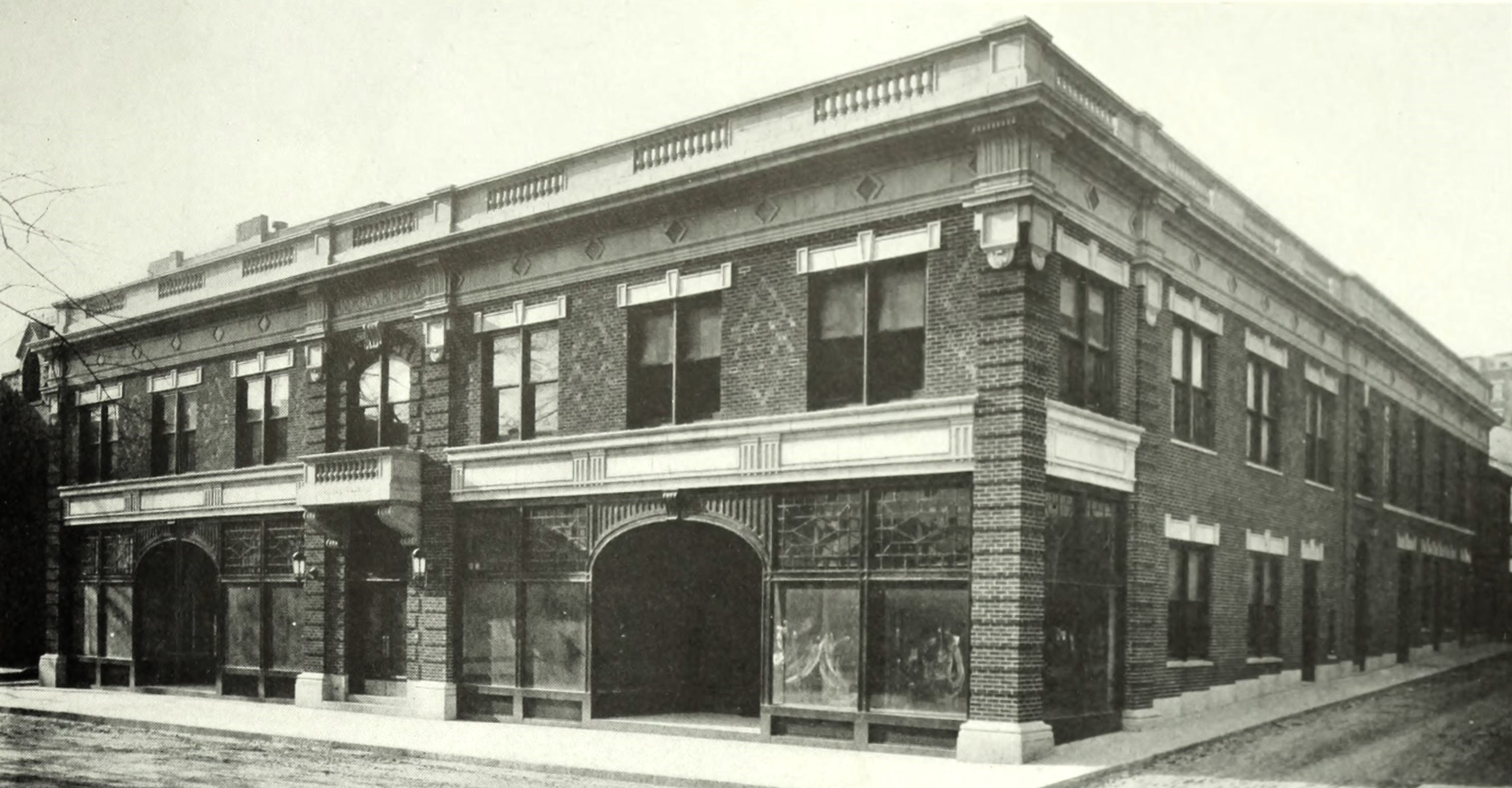
The Andrews Building

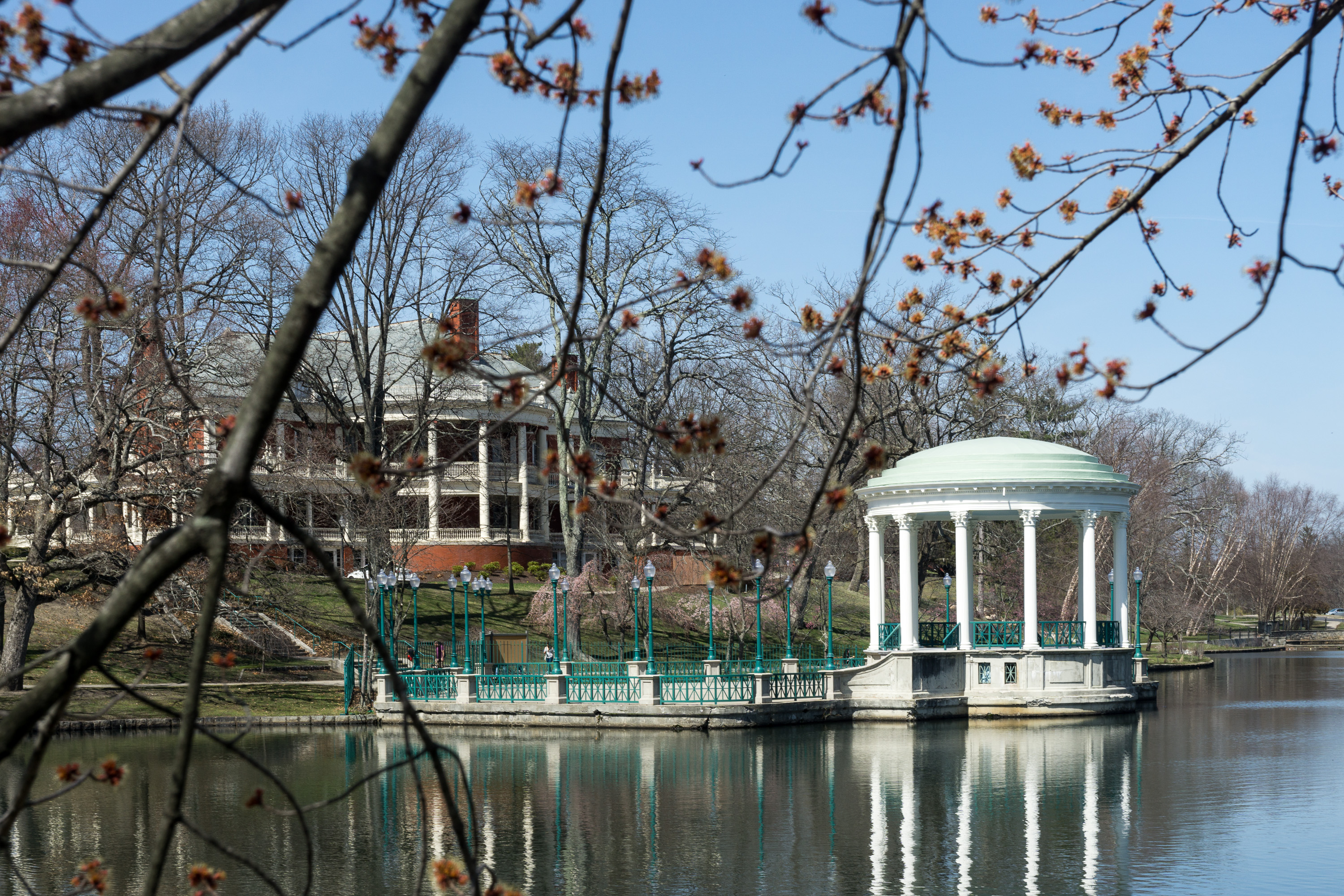
Roger Williams Park bandstand

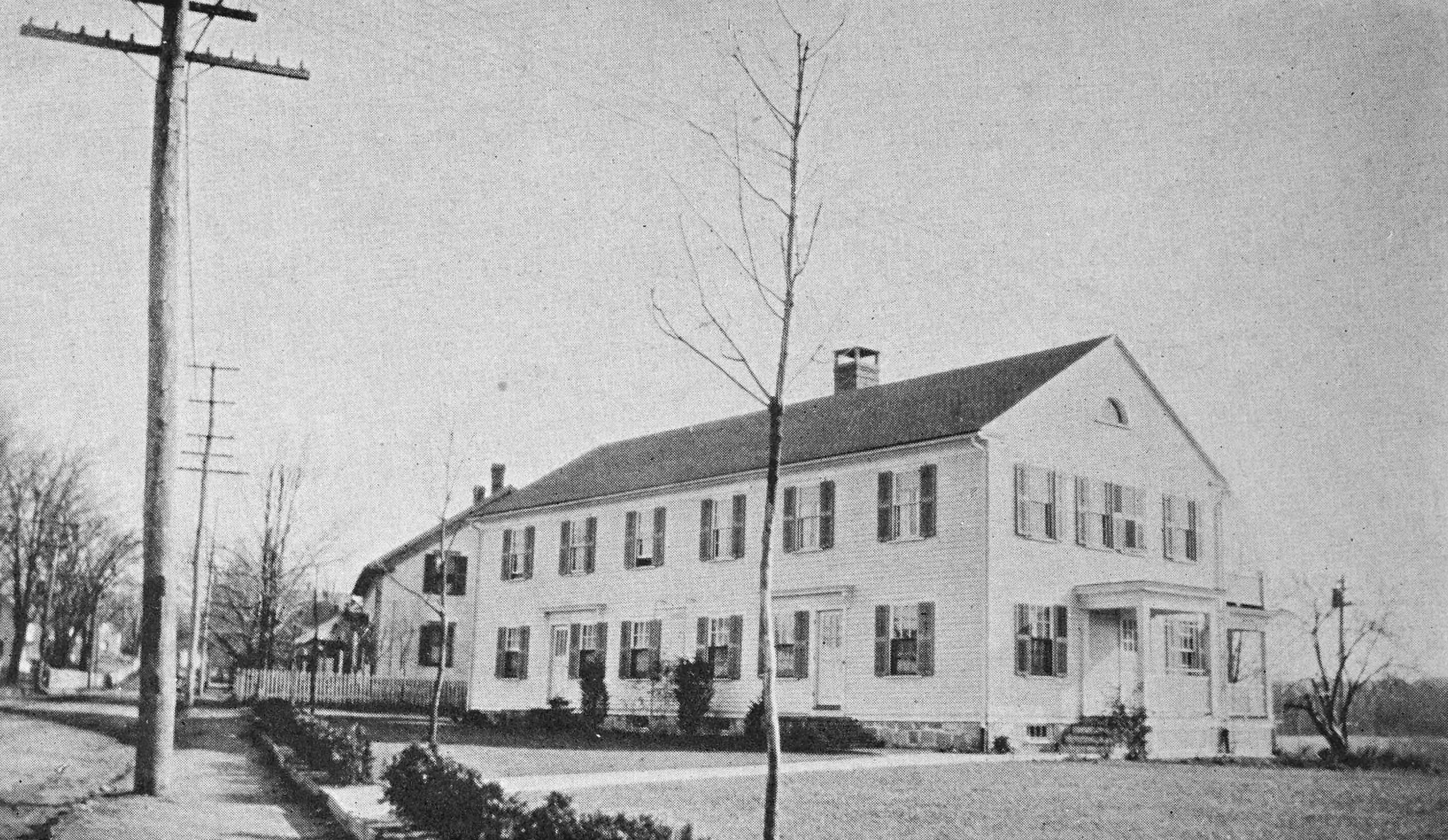
Stillwater Worsted Mills Apartment

=== Designs ===
- The Andrews Building (1913), Providence, Rhode Island
- Packard Motor Company Showroom (1915), 202 Washington St., Providence, Rhode Island
- Roger Williams Park bandstand (1915), Providence, Rhode Island
- Rhode Island State Hospital for Mental Diseases, C Building (1918), 16 Howard Ave., Cranston, Rhode Island — remodeled in 1936 by Albert H. Humes
- "Workers' Housing" (c. 1920), 93–95 East Ave., Burrillville, Rhode Island
- Apartment House for Stillwater Worsted Mills (c. 1924), Harrisville, Rhode Island
- Swan Point Cemetery chapel (1932), Providence, Rhode Island

=== Renovations and remodels ===
- Market House — hired to remodel the interior with classrooms and studios
- Smith's Castle — Cady and Norman Isham stabilized the house and performed several minor restorations
- Swan Point Cemetery — enlarged chapel and crematorium wing (1947)

=== Publications ===
- Rhode Island Boundaries (1936)
- Planning and zoning in Rhode Island (1937) — with Howard K. Menhinick
- Walks Around Providence (1942)
- Highroads and Byroads of Providence (1943)
- Rhode Island History (1943) — with Richard LeBaron Bowen and George L. Miner
- Swan Point Cemetery, Centennial History (1947)
- The Providence Market House and its neighborhood (1952)
- Civic and Architectural Development of Providence (1957)
