= Wickford, Rhode Island =

Village in North Kingstown, Rhode Island, US

- Wickford Historic District
- U.S. National Register of Historic Places
- U.S. Historic district
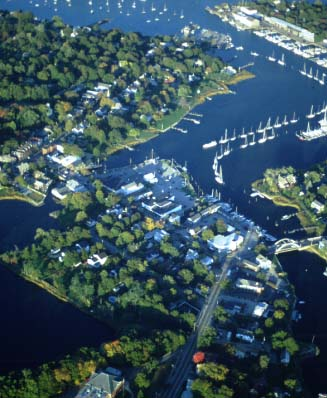
- Wickford from the air, looking east.

- Location within Rhode Island Location within the United States
- Location: North Kingstown, Rhode Island
- Coordinates: 41°34′26″N 71°27′41″W
- Area: 380 acres (150 ha)
- Architect: Tefft, T.A.; Sawtelle, W.C.
- Architectural style: Greek Revival, Late Victorian, Federal
- NRHP reference No.: 74000013
- Added to NRHP: December 31, 1974

Wickford is a small village in the town of North Kingstown, Rhode Island, United States. Wickford is located on the western side of Narragansett Bay, just about a 20-minute drive across two bridges from Newport, Rhode Island. The village is built around one of the most well-protected natural harbors on the eastern seaboard, and features one of the largest collections of 18th century dwellings to be found anywhere in the Northeast. Today, the majority of the village's historic homes and buildings (most in private hands) remain largely intact upon their original foundations.

== History ==
Wickford was named after Wickford in Essex, England, and is generally said to have been settled around 1637, when theologian and Rhode Island state founder Roger Williams bought a parcel of land from sachem Canonicus and established a trading post there. Prior to European contact, the lands in and around Wickford had long served as dwelling, fishing, and hunting grounds to the Narragansett people, who were one of New England's more powerful and prominent tribes at the time when Williams found his way to their shores.

Richard Smith established a trading post on Narragansett Bay near the mouth of Cocumscussoc Brook at about the same time as Williams' purchase. He was a Puritan from Gloucester, England who had originally settled in the Plymouth Colony's town of Taunton. In 1637, he built what appears to have been a rather grand, gabled house on the site, which Williams described in his letters as the first English house in the area. This house was also heavily fortified, and thus became known as Smith's Castle.

During 1651, Smith purchased Roger Williams' trading post, and continued expanding his holdings over the years, building what came to be called the Cocumscussoc Plantation. His plantation became a center of social, religious, and political life in the area. During King Philip's War, the only incident of an individual being hanged, drawn, and quartered for treason on American soil took place at Smith's Castle in 1676. Joshua Tefft was executed by this method, an English colonist accused of having fought on the side of the Narragansetts during the Great Swamp Fight.

During King Philip's War, many of the homes that had been built during this brief period of expansion were destroyed. One of the homes that went was Smith's Castle, which was burned to the ground in 1676. Two years later, Richard Smith Jr. built a new home on the old foundation, retaining the name "Smith's Castle". This structure remains standing today and is one of the area's most visited historic sites.

Following King Philip's War, Wickford grew steadily as a port and shipbuilding center. To this day, the waterfront remains very active. Captain Lodowick Updike developed much of the early village between 1709 and 1715 after inheriting the land in 1692 from his grandfather Richard Smith, owner of Smith's Castle and the surrounding lands. The village was often interchangeably called "Updike's New Town" or "Wickford" in honor of the English home town of the wife of Governor John Winthrop of Connecticut. In 1707, the Old Narragansett Church was founded in downtown Wickford, and survives as the oldest Episcopal church building in the northeastern United States. The British military attempted to raid Wickford during the American Revolution in 1776, but the "Wickford gun" was used to thwart the invading British expedition, a single cannon commissioned by the General Assembly for the town to defend itself. Later, the gun was taken to Point Judith, despite local Tories' attempts to disable the weapon. There it was used to force a British ship to surrender its crew. The prisoners were removed to Providence.

In the 1800s, the Washington Academy was established as a crucial institution to meet the growing need for public education. Founded in North Kingstown, with contributions from leaders in Providence and Newport, this academy aimed to train young men as educators. Samuel Elam, a prominent businessman from New York and Newport, served as its first president. He maintained a summer estate near the small mill village of Annaquatucket in North Kingstown.

The prosperity of Wickford began to decline when it was bypassed by the Providence and Stonington Railroad in the late 1830s. Additionally, a shipping dispute with Providence, fueled by exorbitant wharfage prices set by waterfront property owners, deterred major trading companies like Brown & Ives from utilizing Wickford.

The revitalization of Wickford commenced with the construction of the Sea View Trolley Line about two decades later. Wealthy Narragansett casino owners, eager to facilitate access to their resorts and beaches, largely funded this initiative, following the success of the Newport Line.

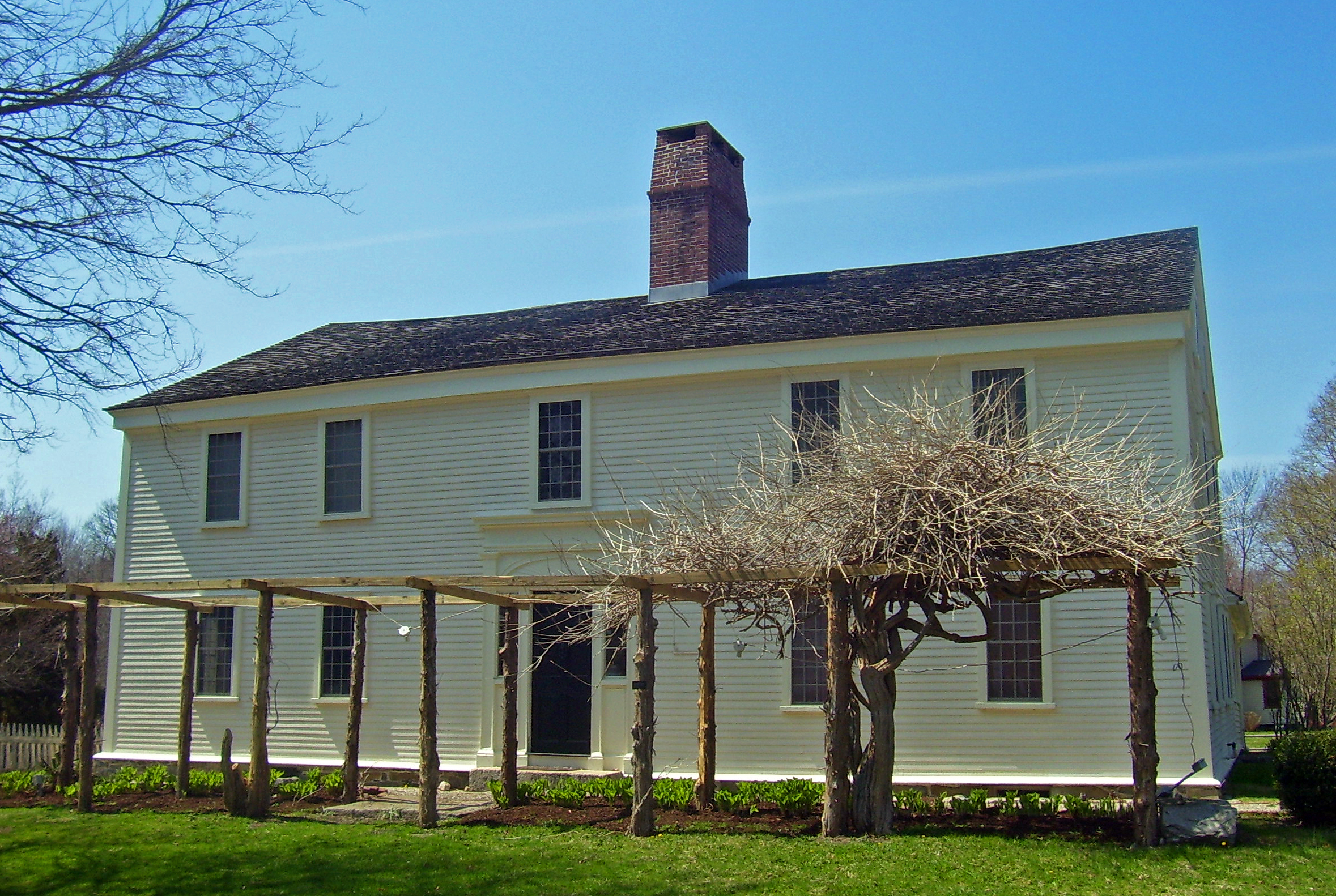
Smith's Castle, built in 1678

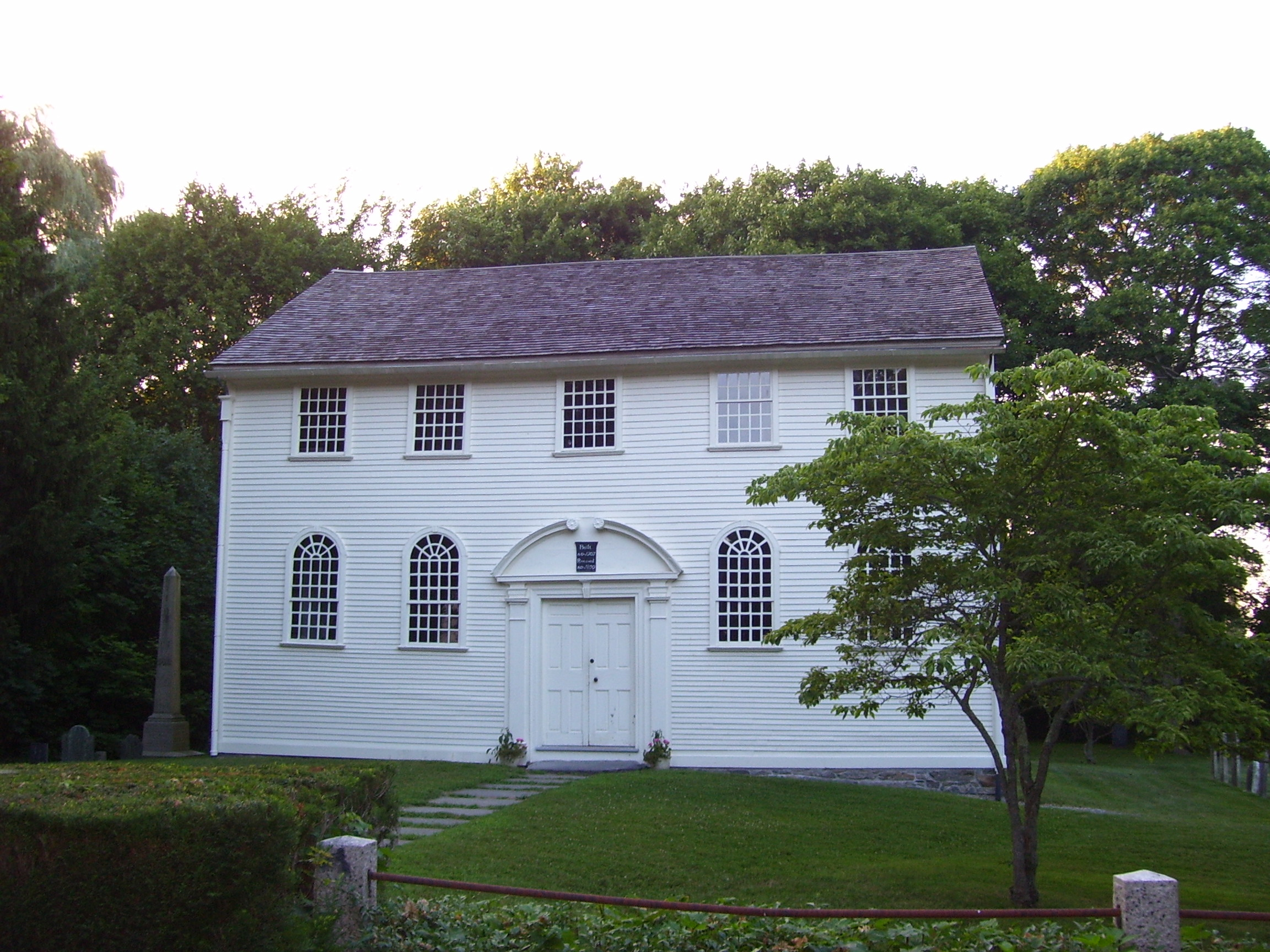
Old Narragansett Church, built in 1707, is the oldest Episcopal Church in the Northeast.

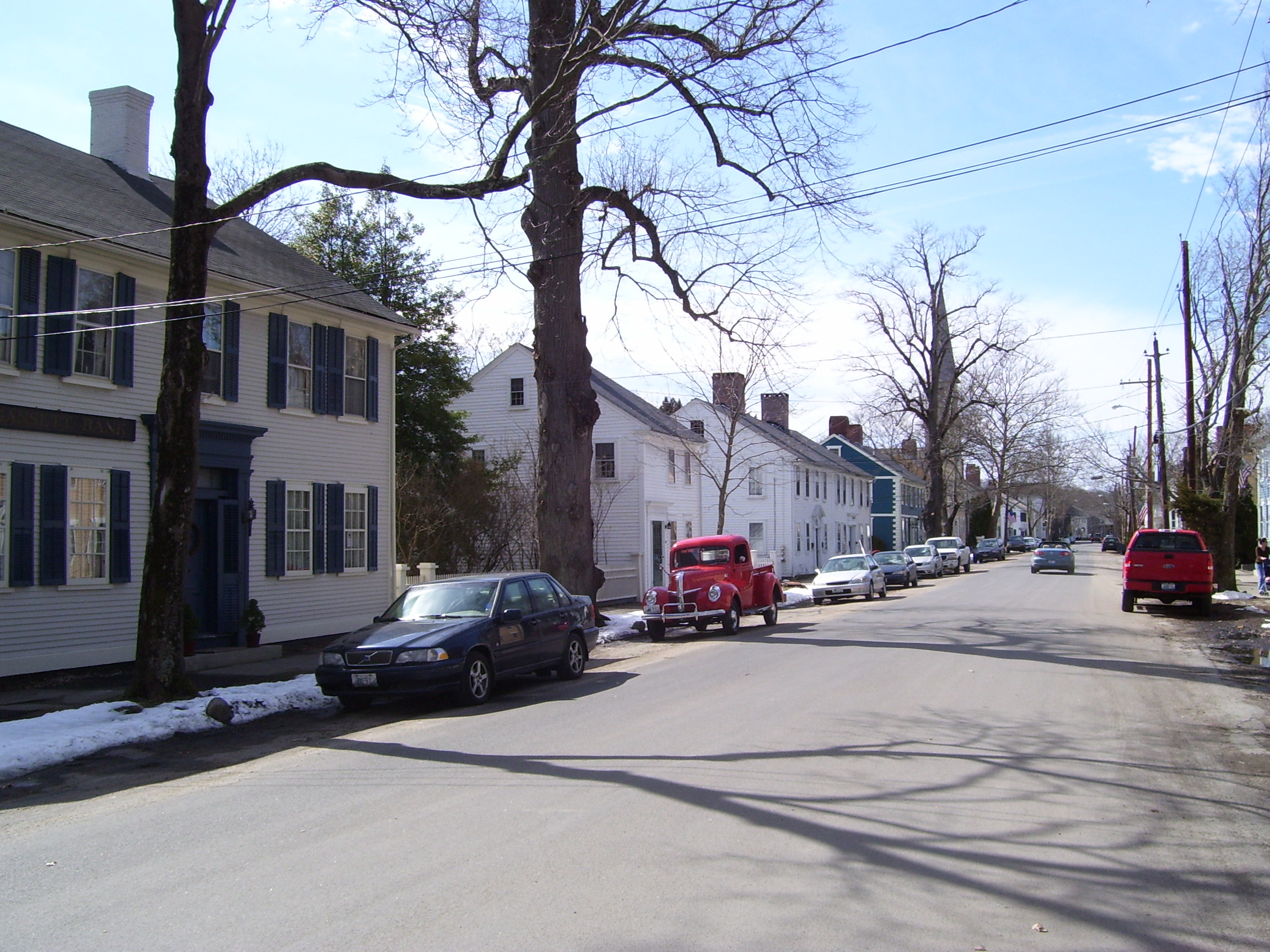
Wickford in 2009

== Notable residents ==
In 1755, painter Gilbert Stuart was born in Saunderstown, a village to the south of Wickford, in a snuff-mill that still stands and is open to the public in season. Other famous residents have included novelist Owen Wister, who for decades summered in a home just to the south of the village. Wickford was also home to Paule Stetson Loring, artist for Yachting magazine and other publications, and longtime editorial page cartoonist for The Providence Journal. A popular urban legend maintains that novelist John Updike hailed originally from Wickford—but this is not the case. Updike was born and raised in Pennsylvania. Updike did, however, use Wickford as the model for the fictional village of Eastwick in his novel, The Witches of Eastwick (Knopf: 1984). (Nevertheless, a branch of the Updike, or Op Den Dyck, family was among the first settling families of Wickford; the original village was at one time called Updike's Newtown. The descendants of Richard Smith and Lodowick Updike intermarried and the Updikes were residents of Smith's Castle in the colonial era.) Christian leader Joshua V. Himes grew up in Wickford.

== Notable people ==
- Frances Irene Burge Griswold, writer
- Louis Sauzedde, shipwright

== Wickford Art Festival ==
The Wickford Art Festival—held in July of every year since 1962 and hosted by the Wickford Art Association—is one of the leading such events on the Eastern Seaboard, attracting hundreds of prominent artists and thousands of spectators from across the country and around the world.

== See also ==
- National Register of Historic Places listings in Washington County, Rhode Island
