= List of people from South Kingstown, Rhode Island =

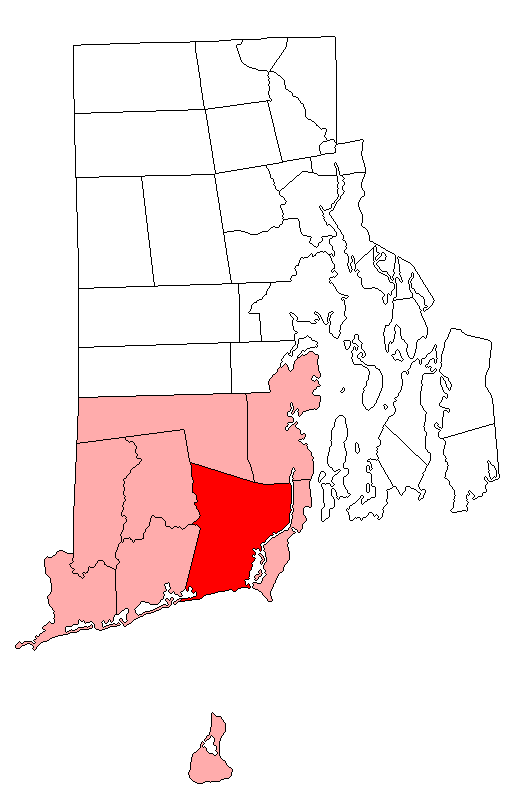
Location of South Kingstown on the Rhode Island map

This is a list of prominent people who were born in the town of South Kingstown, Rhode Island or who spent significant periods of their lives in the town.

== Academia ==
- Herman Churchill (1869–1941) – historian, college professor, and founder of the University of Rhode Island's history department
- T. Stephen Crawford (1900–1987) – chemical engineer and dean of the College of Engineering at the University of Rhode Island
- Caroline Hazard (1856–1945) – fifth president of Wellesley College
- William Metz (1914–2013) – historian and chairman of the University of Rhode Island's history department
- Roy G. Poulsen (1918–2006) – economist and director of the Research Center in Business and Economics at the University of Rhode Island
- Michael Rice (born 1955) – chairman of the Department of Fisheries, Animal and Veterinary Science at the University of Rhode Island
- Hermann Viets (1943–2017) – astronautics engineer and president of the Milwaukee School of Engineering
- Homer Jay Wheeler (1861–1945) – chemist and director of the Rhode Island Agricultural Experiment Station at the University of Rhode Island

== Activism, civil rights, and philanthropy ==
- George Fayerweather (1802–1869) – abolitionist and blacksmith
- Sarah Harris Fayerweather (1812–1878) – abolitionist
- Edward Everett Hale (1822–1909) – religious leader and abolitionist
- Joe Patrick II (born 1963) – activist and retired Army soldier

== Art, literature, and design ==
- C. J. Chivers (born 1964) – author
- Jhumpa Lahiri (born 1967) – author

== Business ==
- Augustus George Hazard (1802–1868) – businessman and gunpowder manufacturer
- Rowland G. Hazard (1801–1888) – industrialist and politician
- Rowland Hazard III (1881–1945) – businessman and politician

== Crime ==
- Michael Woodmansee (born 1958) – child murderer

== Film, television, and stage ==
- Mark Atkinson – actor
- Andrew Burnap (born 1991) – actor
- Kate French (born 1984) – actress
- Brendan O'Malley (born 1969) – actor

== Journalism ==
- Lindsay Crouse (born 1984) – documentary film producer
- Bob Rathbun (born 1954) – sportscaster

== Military ==
- William J. Babcock (1841–1897) – Medal of Honor recipient
- David B. Champagne (1932–1952) – Medal of Honor recipient
- Stephen Champlin (1789–1870) – Navy officer
- William G. Fournier (1913–1943) – Medal of Honor recipient
- Christopher Raymond Perry (1761–1818) – Navy officer and chief justice of the Court of Common Pleas for Washington County
- Matthew C. Perry (1794–1858) – Navy officer
- Oliver Hazard Perry (1785–1819) – Navy officer
- Isaac P. Rodman (1822 – 1862) – Army officer and politician

== Music ==
- Aaron Rossi (born 1980) – drummer
- Erika Van Pelt (born 1985) – singer

== Politics and government ==
- Lemuel H. Arnold (1792–1852) – governor of Rhode Island and U.S. representative from Rhode Island
- James V. Aukerman (born 1948) – member of the Rhode Island House of Representatives
- George Brown (1746–1836) – lieutenant governor of Rhode Island
- Erasmus D. Campbell (1811–1873) – governor of Wisconsin
- Kathleen Fogarty (born 1965) – member of the Rhode Island House of Representatives
- John Gardner (1747–1808) – delegate to the Congress of the Confederation from Rhode Island
- Walter Gray (born 1926) – member of the Rhode Island House of Representatives
- Grafton Kenyon (1882–1960) – member of the Rhode Island House of Representatives and Rhode Island Senate
- Carder Hazard (1734–1792) – associate justice of the Rhode Island Supreme Court
- George Hazard (1700–1738) – deputy governor of Colonial Rhode Island
- Robert Hazard (1702–1751) – deputy governor of Colonial Rhode Island
- Edward Holland (1931 or 1932–2015) – Rhode Island senator
- Gilbert V. Indeglia (born 1941) – associate justice of the Rhode Island Supreme Court
- Henry Marchant (1741–1796) – Founding Father and attorney general of Rhode Island
- Paul Mumford (1734–1805) – lieutenant governor of Rhode Island and chief justice of the Rhode Island Supreme Court
- Thomas Mumford (1625–1692) – settled South Kingstown and served as the first high sheriff
- Peter Neronha (born 1963) – 74th attorney general of Rhode Island
- Nathaniel Niles (1741–1828) – U.S. representative from Vermont
- Elisha R. Potter (1764–1835) – U.S. representative from Rhode Island
- Elisha R. Potter Jr. (1811–1882) – U.S. representative from Rhode Island
- Samuel J. Potter (1753–1804) – lieutenant governor of Rhode Island and U.S. senator from Rhode Island
- Rob Roy Rawlings (1920–2001) – member of the Rhode Island House of Representatives
- Roy Willard Rawlings (1883–1973) – speaker of the Rhode Island House of Representatives
- William Robinson (1693–1751) – deputy governor of Colonial Rhode Island
- John Shanley Jr. (1944–2021) – member of the Rhode Island House of Representatives
- V. Susan Sosnowski (born 1955) – Rhode Island senator
- Teresa Tanzi (born 1971) – member of the Rhode Island House of Representatives
- Robert Tiernan (1929–2014) – U.S. representative from Rhode Island
- Lucy Rawlings Tootell (1911–2010) – member of the Rhode Island House of Representatives

== Science ==
- John Barlow (1872–1944) – entomologist
- Dorothy Bliss (1916–1987) – carcinologist and president of the American Society of Zoologists
- Alexander M. Cruickshank (1919–2017) – chemist and director of the Gordon Research Conferences
- Silvester Gardiner (1708 – 1786) – physician
- W. George Parks (1904–1975) – chemist and director of the Gordon Research Conferences
- John Sieburth (1927–2006) – biologist
- Samuel Slocum (1792–1861) – inventor
- Clarence M. Tarzwell (1907–1993) – biologist
- Malford W. Thewlis (1889–1956) – physician
- Richard W. Traxler (1928–2010) – microbiologist

== Sports ==
- William Beck (1929–2017) – U.S. Olympian (1952 and 1956)
- Harry P. Cross (1873–1955) – football player and coach
- Martha Fierro (born 1977) – chess grandmaster and vice president of FIDE
- Parker Ford (born 2000) – NHL hockey player
- Ron Locke (born 1942) – baseball player
- Sean Maloney (born 1971) – baseball player
- Fred Tootell (1902–1964) – U.S. Olympian (1924)

== See also ==
- List of University of Rhode Island people
- List of people from Rhode Island
- Hazard family
- Perry family
