= Tavern Hall Preservation Society =

Non-profit company

The Elisha Reynolds House (1738), home of the Tavern Hall Preservation Society, Kingston, RI.

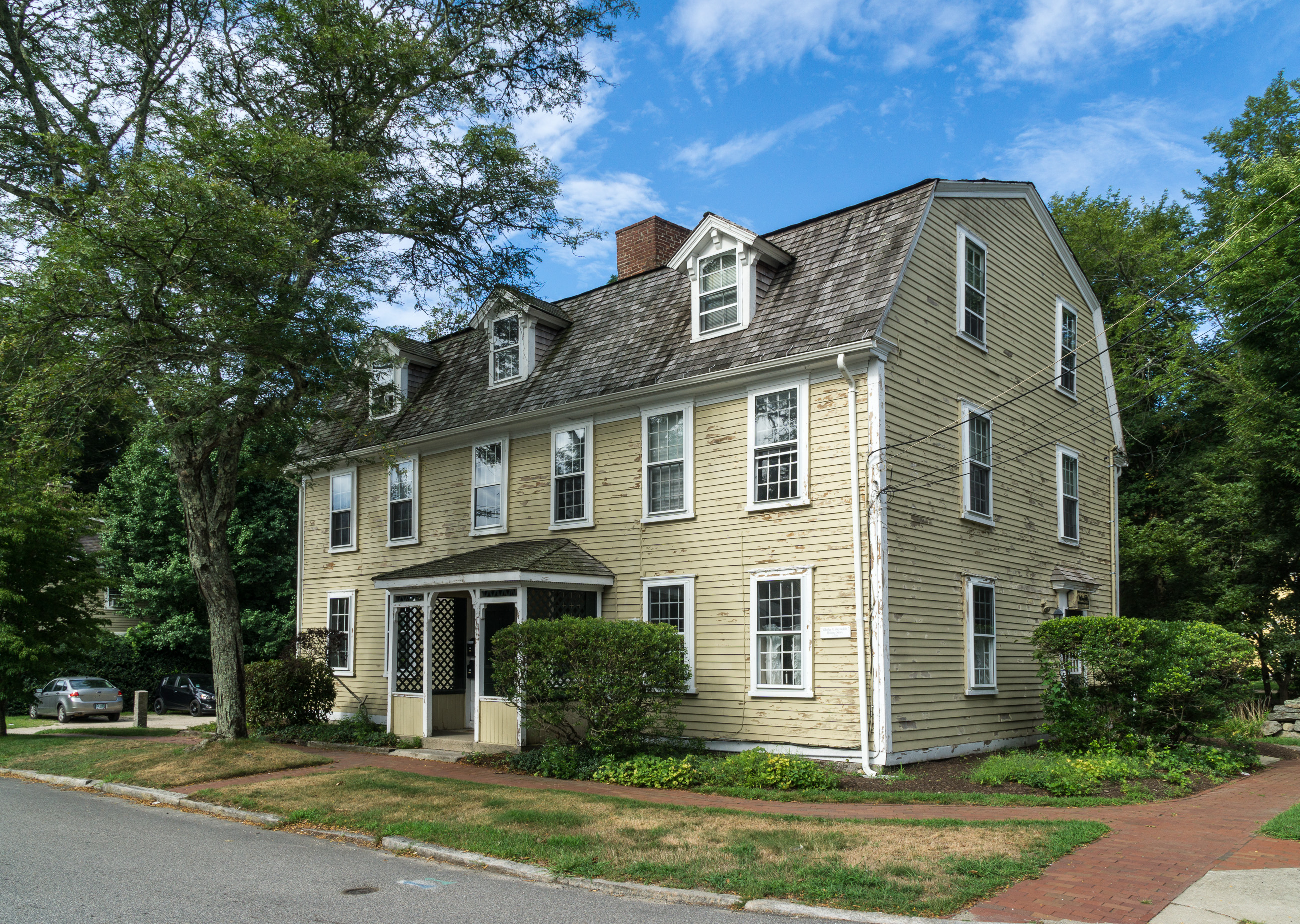
Elisha Reynolds House in 2016.

The Tavern Hall Preservation Society is a not-for-profit corporation dedicated to the preservation and upkeep of the Elisha Reynolds House (1738) in Kingston, Rhode Island. The society was founded as the Tavern Hall Club in 1911 to foster understanding and cooperation between the people of the Village of Kingston and the nearby Rhode Island State College community.

== Organizational history ==
The Tavern Hall Preservation Society was founded in 1911 as the Tavern Hall Club by Robert A. Lichtenthaeler and four other professors from Rhode Island State College at the Hagar House on Old North Road in Kingston, Rhode Island to foster understanding and cooperation between the people of the Village of Kingston and the community of students, faculty, administrators and staff at the college. The name of the club was derived from the fact that from 1911 to 1919 the club met at the no longer extant Joseph Reynolds' Tavern (Note: Also known at various points in time as the Caleb Wescott Tavern, Taylor's Tavern, or The Locusts. In The Jonny-Cake Papers of Shepherd Tom, Thomas Robinson Hazard (1915) wrote of the conviviality of patrons of Joe Runnel's Tavern (sic).) in the west end of the Caleb Wescott House 41.480302°N 71.5241705°W in Kingston. The club was first registered as a corporation with the Secretary of State of Rhode Island on 23 March 1914 with its charter president, Robert A. Lichtenthaeler and the charter board of directors Frank H. Bills, Wilbur E. Dove, George E. Merkle, Lawrence S. Crosby, and Roy B. Cooley as signatories.

The Tavern Hall Club has been the institutional sponsor of Boy Scout Troop 1, Kingston, since its founding in 1923. Troop 1 is now one of the oldest continuously operating boy scout troops in America. From its earliest days, the Tavern Hall Club has served the community by providing educational programs and social activities for residents of Kingston.

In 1994, the membership voted unanimously to amend the constitution to admit women as full members, and in 1996, the first woman president of the club, Elizabeth L. Indeglia, was elected.

Beginning in 2004, the Tavern Hall Club was superseded by the Tavern Hall Preservation Society through incorporation as a 501-(c)3 not-for-profit corporation dedicated to the preservation of its meeting house, built in 1738 by Elisha Reynolds (1706-1791). Reynolds served as a colonel in the militia and was a judge of the Court Martial during the French and Indian War, and was a signatory on the Charter of Brown University in 1768. The Reynolds House is one of the oldest continuously occupied buildings in the village of Kingston.

The year 2011 was marked by a centennial celebration by the society.

Presidents of the Tavern Hall Club and Tavern Hall Preservation Society
Year	President	Year	President	Year	President	Year	President	Year	President
1911-1914	Robert A. Lichtenthaeler	1915-1916	John Barlow	1917	C.L. Coggins	1918	L.W. Boardman	1919	Samuel C. Damon
1920-1921	Earnest K. Thomas	1922	Walton H. Scott	1923	Joseph W. Ince	1924	A.E. Stene	1925	William Andersen
1926	B.L. Hartwell	1927	John E. Ladd	1928	John B. Smith	1929	Herman Churchill	1930	Herbert C. Wells
1931	Frank H. Bills	1932	Theodore E. Odland	1933	Carroll D. Billmyer	1934	Harry L. Thomas	1935	Lee C. McCauley
1936	D.E. Stearns	1937-1938	V.H. Noll	1939	Edward M.J. Pease	1940	Jesse DeFrance	1941	Thomas Higgins
1942	W. George Parks	1943	T. Stephen Crawford	1944	Basil E. Gilbert	1945	Lorenzo F. Kinney, Jr.	1946	Ralph K. Carlton
1947	J. Rieff K. Stauffer	1948	John G. Albright	1949	John R. Elred	1950	Theodore W. Kerr, Jr.	1951	Harland F. Stuart
1952	Arthur E. Tremaine	1953	Clifford W. Whiteside	1954	Arthur L. Svenson	1955	Frank N. VanBuren	1956	Samuel G. Blount
1957	Alexander M. Cruickshank	1958	Arnold S. Knowles, Jr.	1959	Roy G. Poulsen	1960	James Ainsworth	1961	George T. Marsh
1962	Frank O. Barton	1963	Kenneth H. Mairs	1964	Carlton H. Towle	1965	Robert Paulis	1966	Clifford J. Cosgrove
1967	Earl R. Handy	1968	Gilbert S. Stafford	1969	H. Wesley Hilding	1970	William D. Metz	1971	Bruce C. Dunham
1972	Philip H. Wilson	1973-1975	Edward A. Whalen	1976	Dorman J. Hayes	1977	James V. Aukerman	1978	John D. Avedisian
1979	Kenneth L. Coombs	1980	Clarence M. Tarzwell	1981	Gilbert V. Indeglia	1982	Kevin S. Munroe	1983	E. Arthur Robinson
1984	Peter A. Gionis	1985-1986	R.B. Reaves	1987	Clarence M. Cummins	1988	Clarence M. Tarzwell	1989	Clifford J. Fantel
1990	William D. Metz	1991	Ward Abusamra	1992	Daniel E. Healy	1993	James V. Aukerman	1994	Irving A. Spaulding
1995	Richard W. Traxler	1996-1997	Elizabeth L. Indeglia	1998	Angelo Mendillo	1999-2000	Michael A. Rice	2001	Barbara Viles
2002	Theodore F. Jakubowski	2003-2004	Robert L. Liguori	2004	Eileen Sadasiv	2005	Theodore F. Jakubowski	2006-2011	Robert J. Sirhal
2011-	Elizabeth L. Indeglia

== Elisha Reynolds House (1738) ==
The Elisha Reynolds House (1738) and the Kingston village well at the corner of Kingstown Road and South Road in Kingston, RI. Watercolor by David Davidson ca1910.

The Tavern Hall Club purchased the Elisha Reynolds House 41.479796°N 71.523325°W in 1919 to serve as its meetinghouse, located at 1800 South Road on the corner of Kingstown Road (Route 138). Over the years in addition to being the home of Col. Elisha Reynolds, the house served as the home of Elisha Reynolds Potter (1764–1835), Reynolds's grandson, who served as the Speaker of the Rhode Island House of Representatives and became a U.S. Congressman. It was also one of several homes owned by Potter's son Elisha Reynolds Potter, Jr. (1811–1882) who was a Justice of the Rhode Island Supreme Court, and also a U.S. Congressman like his father.

During the Revolution, the house was used as a meeting place for the 3rd Kings County Regiment of the Rhode Island militia (known as the Kingston Reds), that was formed in May 1779 under the command of Col. Thomas Potter. On 5 March 1781, Col. Potter served as host of General George Washington and his officers in the house on a final stop on their famed journey to confer with General Rochambeau in Newport, Rhode Island where the two commanding generals possibly planned Rochambeau's mobilization and the decisive Siege of Yorktown.

In 1785, the ground floor of the house was used as a residence and general store by the name of West India Store operated by storekeeper Thomas R. Wells, whose son Thomas Robinson Wells (1785-1853) married Maria Potter (1791-1831). (Note: Descendants of Thomas Robinson Wells were prominent in the Rhode Island banking industry, including his grandson, Kingston resident and Tavern Hall Club member Herbert Johnson Wells (1850-1933), the third president of the Rhode Island Hospital Trust Company.) The house later served as the home of South Kingstown's first newspaper The Rhode Island Advocate published by James Brenton in 1832. It was succeeded in 1854 by the South County Journal, which was renamed to become the Narragansett Times in 1864. For a short time from 1838-42, the house was owned by the Kingston Boot and Shoe Company, but the house was reacquired by Justice Potter in payment for outstanding debts on the mortgage. The house was then transferred to Justice Potter's brother Thomas Mawney Potter in 1843, and it remained in the Potter family until its sale to the Tavern Hall Club on 15 March 1919 by Carroll Potter.

In the summer 1872, the house was rented to Austrian opera star Pauline Lucca and her retinue during her two-year concert tour in the United States and while she was in the beginning of a bitterly contested divorce. In 1882, Dr. Thomas Mawney Potter established a boarding house for women in the building, and in 1885, sisters Orpha and Elizabeth Rose established a millinery and women's clothing store famous for its worsted goods in a room on the ground floor. At the same time, the Rose sisters served as librarians for books held at the house that eventually became the nucleus of the book collection of the Kingston Free Library, which was later established in the mid-1890s at the Old King's County Courthouse in Kingston after the Washington County Courthouse was built in 1892. Upon the sale of the Reynolds House to the Tavern Hall Club in 1919, the building was used to house male members of the club. Later on, visitors to Kingston, including students attending Rhode Island State College (now the University of Rhode Island) stayed at the house. Additionally, in the 19th century and early decades of the 20th century it was used as a meeting place for the volunteer fire brigade of the village. The parlor and billiard room of the Reynolds House have been used since 1919 as the meeting place for the club and the boy scout troop since 1923, and as a venue for club-sponsored billiards tournaments.

In 1959, the house was designated as part of the Kingston Village Historic District by the Town of South Kingstown, and in 1974, it was placed on the National Register of Historic Places as part of the Kingston Historic District.
