= William Russell Sweet =

American artist (1860–1946)

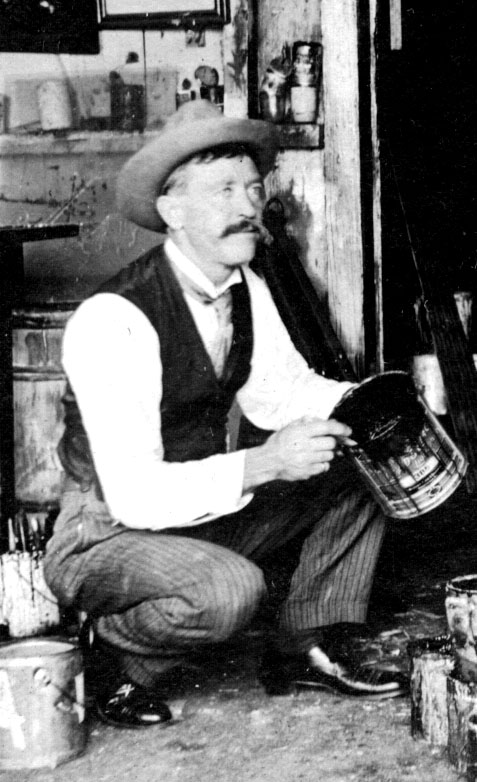
William Russell Sweet 1904 in his Peacedale, RI art studio.

William Russell Sweet (November 18, 1860 – October 15, 1946) was an early American artist, painter and sculptor.

== Biography ==
William Russell Sweet was known throughout the Narragansett, Rhode Island, area as "The Painter", (documented by the post office receiving postcards and letter under such title) because of his prolific art works in watercolor and oil paintings, many wall murals done for the Newport, Rhode Island, mansions, his restoration artwork, and his masterful wood carving of furniture and wall mounts.

Said to be "of gentle, good natured people" "I consider the Sweets a most remarkable family, not only as natural bone setters, but as an innocent inoffensive, easy going, happy people." William and his family spend many summer days along the coastline of Rhode Island where he sketched and painted pictorial scenes. On loan to South County History Center by his family, samples of William Russell Sweet carved wood chairs and wall plaques, some of his watercolors, and this magnificent hutch cabinet (photos below) themed upon the classical poem "The Song of Hiawatha" from Henry Wadsworth Longfellow. His great-grandson, Carson Young Sweet Ferri Carson Grant has donated several other artworks to the Pettaquamscutt Historical Society Museum in Rhode Island. In 2010, William Russell Sweet was included in Marquis Who's Who edition Who was Who in America Art.

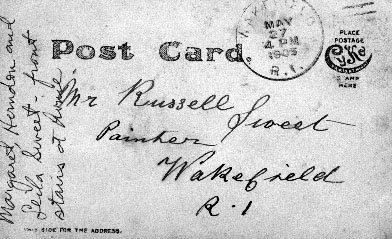
A postcard sent 1905 to general mail "Russell Sweet - Painter"

== Personal Notes ==
William Russell Sweet's family Welsh genealogy dates from John Swete 1450 (Traine, Modbury, Devon, England) through Robert Sweet (1552–1578) and Johanna Rainham (London, England) whose son, John Sweet (1579–1637), emigrated with his wife Mary Periam and their three children John, James and Meribah, to Salem, Massachusetts, March 20, 1630, on the Winthrop Fleet, which departed from Plymouth, England to arrive in Salem, Massachusetts. In 1636 John Sweet who was granted land by Roger Williams, as part of the 38 families who traveled with Williams from Massachusetts to establish the colony of Rhode Island based upon principles of complete religious toleration, separation of church and state, and political democracy; values represented in the United States constitution. "Roger Williams insisted that land must be purchased from the Indians, rather than taken from them forcefully, in order to claim title to it. Williams then purchased land from the Narragansett Indians and established the settlement of Providence, Rhode Island."

After John Sweet's death in 1637, his children John, James and Meribah (renamed Renewed) migrated to southern Rhode Island. John's wife, Mary Periam Sweet, remarried Reverend Ezekiel Holliman and her granddaughter became known in many writing as the 'Widow Sweet' living to 91 years old. The Sweet Family was known for their good disposition, and as natural bone setters. William Russell Sweet was the son of Amos Reynolds Sweet (who helped build the Old Washington County jails in 1858) and Sarah Coggshall Sweet; then married Mary De Laigle Herndon 6/15/1893; and fathered three children (Colonel Russell Herndon Sweet, Margaret Grace Waring Sweet-Treat and Leila Augusta Sweet-Hay: members of SAR and DAR) and was buried in the family plot at Oak Dell Historical Cemetery, Peace Dale, Rhode Island. These two sisters, Margaret and Leila lived to over 100 years old. Colonel Russell Herndon Sweet was honored in 1946 with the 'Legion of Merit' award for his brave work in the Military Intelligence Service of the War Department during both World War I and World War II, who married Lucy Humphrey Young in Rhode Island 1919.

The Sweet family were said to be remarkable and happy natured people. William Russell Sweet was known throughout the Narragansett area as ‘Sweet-The Painter’ (The post office delivered postcards under such title) because of his art works in watercolors, gouaches and oils, many wall murals and restorations created for the famed Newport mansions, and his wood carvings of furniture and wall mounts. William and his family spent many summer days along the coast of Rhode Island, where he sketched and painted scenes of the fields, forests, waterfronts and local architecture, as themes in his watercolors, gouache and oils.

William Russell Sweet carved many pieces including wall plaques, tables and chairs, each of individual themes; such as, the Sweet Coat of Arms, New England sea shells as Quahogs and scallops, maple leaves, nuts and berries, textile weaving patterns, and animals. William Russell Sweet greatly admired the American Indian and depicted their lifestyle in some of his art pieces. He mentored others young artists in these wood carving skills.

In 1896, William Russell Sweet created a hutch cabinet themed upon the classical poem "The Song of Hiawatha" by Henry Wadsworth Longfellow published in 1855. William Russell Sweet, painter and sculptor, carved this hutch cabinet using local oak wood. The figures were fashioned from Amos Sweet's pruned cherry and apple trees (Amos Street) in Peace Dale, RI. This piece of artwork stood in the family parlor and exhibited William's personal collection of Narragansett Indian ‘art-of-fact’ as arrow heads and stone tools found in the soil around southern Rhode Island. In 2009, Carson Grant and his family donated to the Pettaquamscutt Historical Society Museum The Song of Hiawatha' hutch cabinet which has been refinished and will be a permanent focal art piece in the center gallery in time for the Pettaquamscutt Historical Society's 50 Anniversary.
