= James V. Aukerman =

American politician (born 1948)

James Vance Aukerman

Member of the Rhode Island House of Representatives from the 49th district
- In office January 5, 1971 – January 3, 1983
- Preceded by: Joseph P. Rose (D)
- Succeeded by: John D. Hamilton (D)

Personal details
- Born: May 6, 1948 (age 78) South Kingstown, Rhode Island
- Party: Democratic
- Education: Dartmouth College, Suffolk University School of Law
- Profession: Attorney
- Website: James V. Aukerman Law

James Vance Aukerman (born 1948) is an American lawyer in private practice and former Democratic Party Rhode Island State Representative from South Kingstown serving from 1971 to 1983. He was the Democratic candidate for Rhode Island's 2nd congressional district seat for the U.S. House of Representatives in the 1982 elections.

== Biography ==
James V. Aukerman was born 6 May 1948 in South Kingstown, Rhode Island to Robert C. and Louise Aukerman. He graduated from South Kingstown High School in 1966 as class president. He earned the rank of Eagle Scout in 1962 in Kingston, Rhode Island. He earned a Bachelor of Arts degree with distinction at Dartmouth College in 1970, and attended Suffolk University School of Law graduating with a Juris Doctor degree in 1975. Aukerman is a practicing attorney and member of the Rhode Island and American Bar Associations.

== Politics and public service ==
Upon graduation from college, Aukerman ran for the Rhode Island House of Representatives as a Democrat. He won the election in November, 1970 and served as a Representative from South Kingstown until January, 1983. Aukerman did not run for reelection in 1982, but ran for U.S. Congress for the 2nd Congressional seat held by Republican incumbent Claudine Schneider. He was defeated by a margin of 44.4% to 55.6%.

Aukerman has been very active in civic affairs in South Kingstown during and after his service in elective office. He has served as president of the South Kingstown Chamber of Commerce, Kingston Improvement Association, Tavern Hall Preservation Society, and the Dartmouth Alumni Association of Rhode Island, and Treasurer of the Wakefield Rotary Club. He serves on the Board of directors of several not-for-profit organizations, including the South Kingstown Land Trust, Willow Dell Historical Association, Kenvo Foundation and as President of the Board of Narragansett Council Boy Scouts of America.
