= 1859 Rhode Island gubernatorial election =

- April 6, 1859
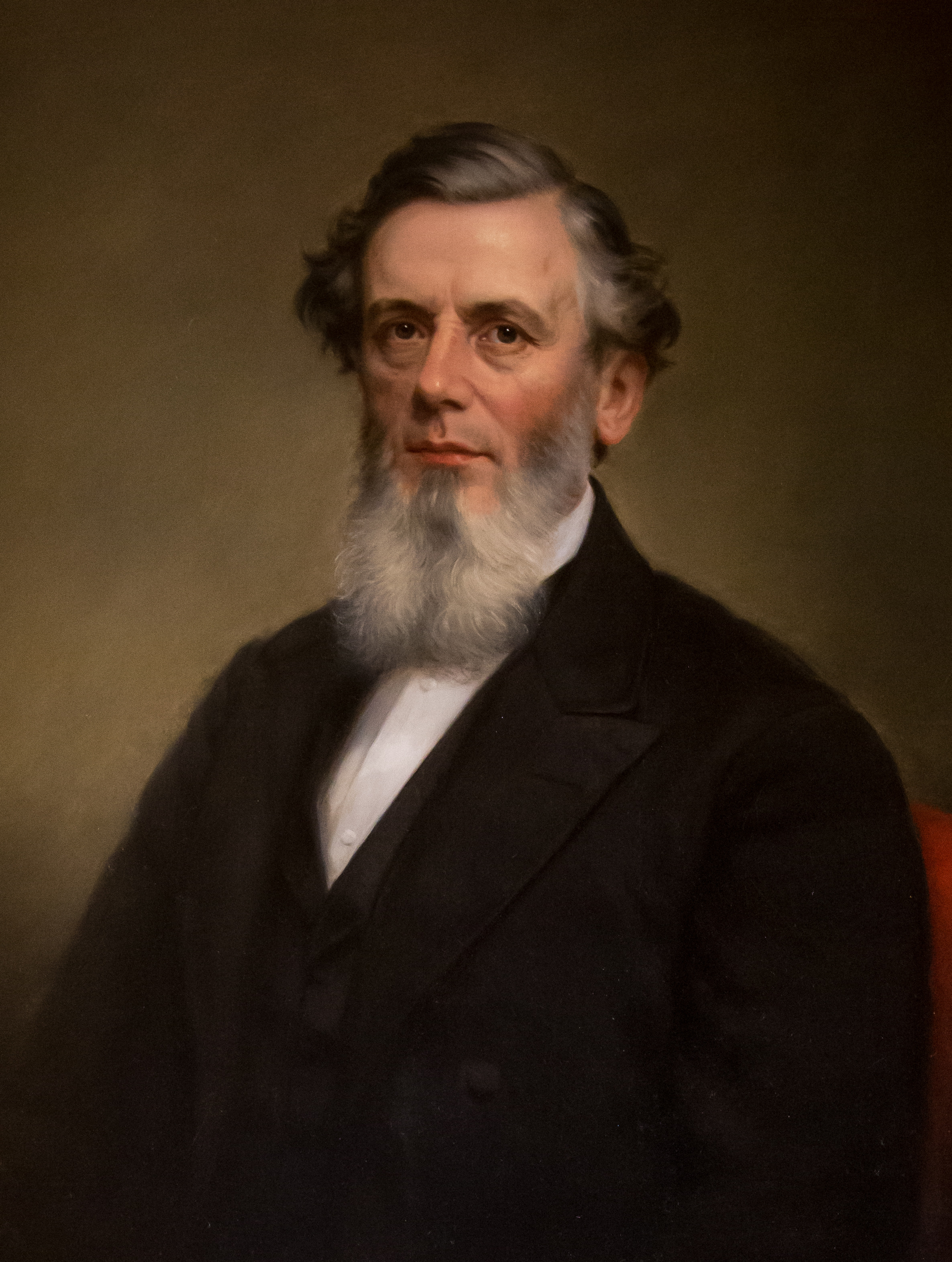

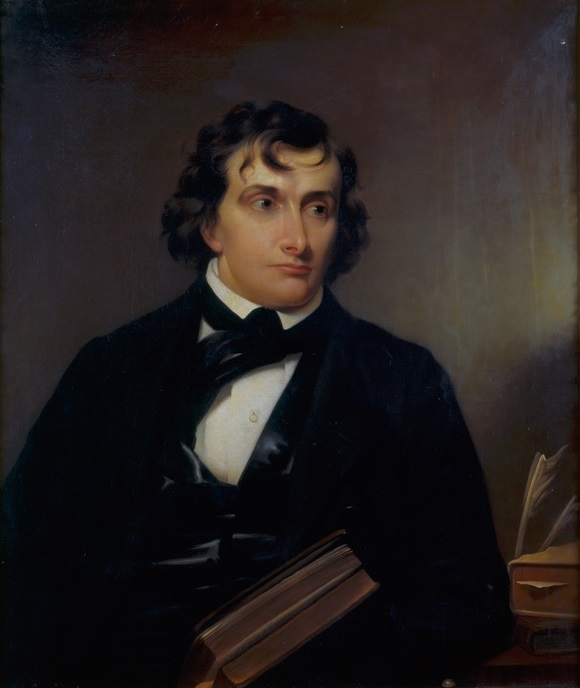
Nominee	Thomas G. Turner	Elisha R. Potter
Party	Republican	Democratic
Popular vote	8,938	3,536
Percentage	71.52%	28.29%
- County results Turner: 60–70% 70–80%
Governor before election
Elisha Dyer
Republican
Elected Governor
Thomas G. Turner
Republican

The 1859 Rhode Island gubernatorial election was held on April 6, 1859.

Incumbent Republican governor Elisha Dyer declined to stand for re-election.

Republican nominee Thomas G. Turner beat Democratic nominee Elisha R. Potter with 71.52% of the vote.

== General election ==
=== Candidates ===
- Elisha R. Potter, Democratic, former U.S. representative, former State commissioner of public schools, Democratic candidate for governor in 1858
- Thomas G. Turner, Republican, incumbent lieutenant governor

=== Results ===
1859 Rhode Island gubernatorial election (Note: Some sources give slightly different results. The result given is taken from the Rhode Island Assembly Journal.)
Party	Candidate	Votes	%	±%
Republican	Thomas G. Turner	8,938	71.52%	
Democratic	Elisha R. Potter	3,536	28.29%	
Scattering		24	0.19%	
Majority		5,402	43.23%	
Turnout		12,498		
Republican hold		Swing		
