= William D. Metz =

American historian and academic

Willam DeWitt Metz
- Born: June 13, 1914; Buffalo, New York
- Died: 11 February 2013 (aged 98); Kingston, Rhode Island
- Known for: Rhode Island History, Heritage conservation
- Spouse: Clarice Stiles (McKenney)
- Children: Elizabeth J. (Metz) McNab; William C. Metz; Margaret C. (Metz) Munroe
- Awards: Distinguished Fulbright Lectureship

Academic background
- Education: University of Wisconsin–Madison

Academic work
- Discipline: American History
- Institutions: University of Rhode Island

Notes
- William Metz Papers at the University of Rhode Island

William DeWitt Metz (June 13, 1914 - February 11, 2013) was an American historian specializing in Rhode Island History. He served as chairman of the Department of History at the University of Rhode Island, retiring after 45 years at the university in 1982. He was especially noted for promotion of heritage conservation and historical preservation activities throughout Rhode Island.

== Biography ==
William DeWitt Metz was born in Buffalo, New York on June 13, 1914 to William J. and Minerva (Lamphear) Metz and was raised in the village of Perry, New York, about 50 miles east of Buffalo. Metz prepared for college at Dexter High School in Maine and graduated from Bates College in Lewiston, Maine in 1937. He subsequently earned his PhD from the University of Wisconsin–Madison in 1945. The following year, he accepted a position in the history department of the University of Rhode Island. Metz consequently spent the rest of his academic career with the history department until his retirement in 1982 as Professor Emeritus of History.

In the forty-five years that Metz was associated with the University of Rhode Island, he served the University of Rhode Island academic community and the citizens of the State of Rhode Island in numerous ways. He was active in publishing numerous articles on Rhode Island history, served as editor of Phi Alpha Theta's journal, The Historian, and was an abstracter for Historical Abstracts. He also served on many university committees, such as the Library Committee, Committee on History of URI, and the Arts and Sciences Committee. He served on the Watson House Committee, the Special URI Faculty Senate Senate Committee on Controversial Visitors, and was the Chairman of the History Department from 1962-to-1968.

From 1966-to-1967, Metz was a visiting distinguished Fulbright lecturer in American History at Makerere University in Kampala, Uganda. He served as president of Phi Alpha Theta and was involved, at one time or another, with Phi Beta Kappa society, and Phi Kappa Phi.

The activities of Professor Metz extended beyond the University as well. In 1958 he was a founding member and later served as president of the Pettaquamscutt Historical Society Museum; he was instrumental in acquiring the Washington County Jail for the home of Society. He was also active with the Cocumscussoc Association, and gave numerous talks on East Africa (because of his sabbatical leave spent in Uganda) and on Rhode Island history throughout his career. In the 1960s, he was a member of the Rhode Island Civil War Centennial Commission in which he conducted programs for marking sites where Abraham Lincoln spoke in Rhode Island in 1860. In 1977, he was elected chairman of the Rhode Island Committee for the Humanities.

He was the first chair of the South Kingstown Historic District Commission, chair of the South Kingstown Bicentennial Commission, and was a founding member of the Rhode Island Historical Preservation and Heritage Commission. Metz also acted as the member-archivist for the historic Kingston Congregational Church, and president of the Tavern Hall Club, in Kingston.

After his retirement from the University of Rhode Island in 1982, Metz was instrumental in establishing the South County Museum in Narragansett, RI. In 1997, the State of Rhode Island honored Metz for his lifelong community service by conferring the state's highest historic preservation award, the Antoinette F. Downing Volunteer Service Award, upon him at a statewide planning conference entitled "Preserving Place-Growing Smart," that was held at URI. Metz died on 11 Feb 2013 at his home in Kingston, RI.
