= Leslie P. Langworthy =

American architect (

- Born: 1848; Little Genesee, New York
- Died: 1919 (aged 70–71); Providence, Rhode Island
- Occupation: Architect
- Practice: L. P. Langworthy, L. P. Langworthy & Company
- Buildings: Washington County Courthouse, Providence Smallpox Hospital, East Hall

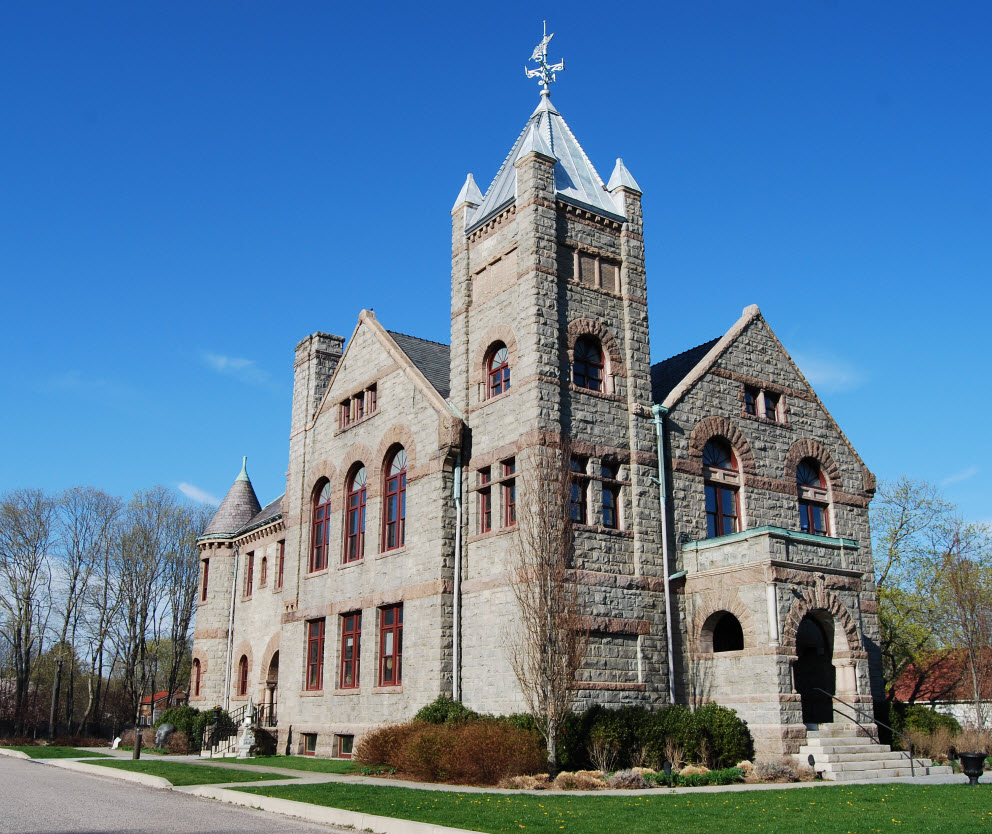
Washington County Courthouse, West Kingston, Rhode Island. 1892.

Leslie P. Langworthy (1848–1919) was an American architect from Providence, Rhode Island.

== Life and career ==
Leslie Pendleton Langworthy was born in 1848 in Little Genesee, New York. He began practicing as an architect in Rhode Island during the 1880s. He was alone until about 1910, when he incorporated his sons into his new firm of L. P. Langworthy & Company. He died in Providence in 1919.

He is best remembered for the Richardsonian Romanesque design of the Washington County Courthouse in West Kingston.

== Architectural works ==
- 1891 - Beacon Avenue Primary School, 104 Beacon Ave, Providence, Rhode Island
- 1892 - Washington County Courthouse, 3481 Kingstown Rd, West Kingston, Rhode Island
- 1897 - Hope Valley School (Remodeling), Main St, Hope Valley, Rhode Island
  - Demolished
- 1902 - Providence Smallpox Hospital, Fields Point, Providence, Rhode Island
  - Demolished
- 1908 - East Hall, University of Rhode Island, Kingston, Rhode Island
- 1912 - Riverside Grammar School, 100 Bullocks Point Ave, Riverside, Rhode Island
- 1912 - Rumford Grammar School, 64 Bourne Ave, Rumford, Rhode Island
  - Demolished
