= Kendra Anderson =

American politician

Member of the Rhode Island Senate from the 31st district
- In office January 5, 2021 – January 3, 2023
- Preceded by: Erin Lynch Prata
- Succeeded by: Matthew LaMountain

Personal details
- Born: June 27, 1957 (age 69)
- Party: Democratic
- Education: Hamilton College (BA)
- Website: https://www.kendraandersonri.com/

Kendra Anderson (born June 27, 1957) is an American politician who served as a Democratic member of the Rhode Island Senate for the 31st district from 2021 to 2023.

== Career ==
Anderson is an ESOL teacher and the founder of Climate Action Rhode Island.

In 2019, Anderson, a progressive, announced that she would challenge longtime incumbent senator and Judiciary Committee chair Erin Lynch Prata in the Democratic primary. Lynch Prata declined to run for re-election, instead accepting an appointment to the Rhode Island Supreme Court, and Anderson won the primary and general election.

In the Senate, Anderson made the climate crisis a top priority, and she cited the passage of a $15 minimum wage and climate legislation among the achievements of her term. On March 29, 2022, she announced that she would not seek re-election and endorsed Harrison Tuttle, executive director of the Black Lives Matter RI PAC, to succeed her in the redrawn district. Anderson said that after leaving the Senate she planned to take the University of Rhode Island Master Gardener course and broaden her work on sustainable food systems in Rhode Island and the Northeast.

In the 2024 presidential election, Anderson endorsed author Marianne Williamson's presidential bid.
