= Elisha R. Potter =

American judge

Elisha Reynolds Potter Jr.
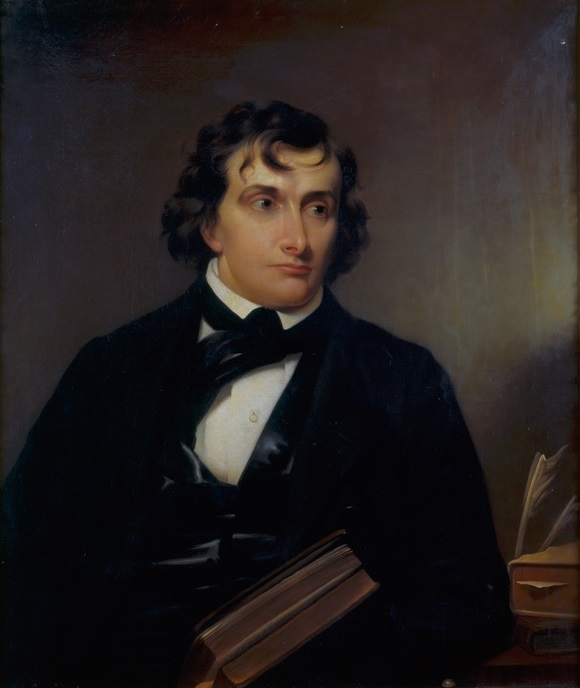

Member of the U.S. House of Representatives from Rhode Island's 2nd district
- In office March 4, 1843 – March 3, 1845
- Preceded by: District created
- Succeeded by: Lemuel H. Arnold

Member of the Rhode Island Senate
- In office 1847–1852; 1861–1863

Personal details
- Born: June 20, 1811 Kingston, Rhode Island, US
- Died: April 10, 1882 (aged 70) Kingston, Rhode Island, US
- Resting place: Colonel Thomas Potter Cemetery in South Kingstown
- Party: Law and Order
- Parent: Elisha Reynolds Potter
- Occupation: Lawyer

Elisha Reynolds Potter (June 20, 1811 – April 10, 1882) was a politician, jurist and historian from Kingston, Rhode Island. He was a justice of the Rhode Island Supreme Court, and served one term in the United States House of Representatives.

== Biography ==
Elisha Reynolds Potter Jr. was born in Little Rest (now Kingston), Rhode Island on June 20, 1811. His father Elisha Reynolds Potter Sr. was a lawyer who served in Congress.

He attended Kingston Academy and graduated from Harvard University in 1830. He studied law while teaching school, was admitted to the bar in 1832 and practiced in South Kingstown Township.

From 1835 to 1836 Potter was adjutant general of the state militia. He served in the Rhode Island House of Representatives from 1838 to 1840. He was a delegate to the state constitutional convention of 1841 to 1842.

In 1842 Potter was elected as a Law and Order Party candidate to the Twenty-eighth Congress, and he served one term, March 4, 1843, to March 3, 1845. During his term he was Chairman of the Committee on Revisal and Unfinished Business. He was an unsuccessful candidate for reelection in 1844 to the Twenty-ninth Congress.

Potter served in the Rhode Island State Senate from 1847 to 1852, and again from 1861 to 1863. He was the state commissioner of public schools from 1849 to 1854.

On March 16, 1868, Potter became an associate justice of the Rhode Island Supreme Court, and he served until his death.

He died in Kingston on April 10, 1882, and was buried in the Colonel Thomas Potter Cemetery in South Kingstown.

Potter was a prolific author of Rhode Island history. Potter's notes and correspondence now held by the Rhode Island Historical Society "may be the best collection in the holdings of the Manuscripts Division for research on either the Dorr Rebellion or early 19th-century Rhode Island politics, including Rhode Island's role in the major national issues of the day and presidential policy-making." Potter's personally annotated copy of the printed draft of what would become the Constitution of Rhode Island is generally regarded as the best extant record, beyond the bare official minutes, of the proceedings of the 1842 constitutional convention.

== See also ==
- Tavern Hall Preservation Society

Party political offices
Preceded by Americus V. Potter	Democratic nominee for Governor of Rhode Island; 1858, 1859	Succeeded by William Sprague IV
U.S. House of Representatives
Preceded by District created	Member of the U.S. House of Representatives from Rhode Island's 2nd congressional district 1843–1845	Succeeded by Lemuel H. Arnold
