= Deckerville Community Schools =

School district in Michigan, United States

Address
- 2633 Black River Street Deckerville, Sanilac County, Michigan, 48427; United States

District information
- Grades: PreKindergarten–12
- Superintendent: Matthew Connelly
- Schools: 2
- Budget: $9,602,000 2022–2023 expenditures
- NCES District ID: 2611700

Students and staff
- Students: 507 (2024–2025)
- Teachers: 35.57 (on an FTE basis) (2024–2025)
- Staff: 106.64 FTE (2024–2025)
- Student–teacher ratio: 14.25 (2024–2025)
- District mascot: Eagles

Other information
- Website: www.deckerville.k12.mi.us

Deckerville Community Schools is a public school district in Sanilac County, in The Thumb region of Michigan. It serves the village of Deckerville, Marion and Forester townships, and parts of the townships of Argyle, Bridgehampton, Custer, Delaware, Minden, and Wheatland.

== History ==
A new school was built in Deckerville in 1901. It served the community unaltered for 49 years. Additions were built in 1950, 1952, 1955, and 1958.

By 1964, the state fire marshal recommended renovations to the 1901 section to increase safety, but voters turned down a bond issue to fund construction twice that year. The addition of a gymnasium was dedicated in October 1964.

Voters approved construction of an extensive addition and demolition of the section with fire code deficiencies in August 1965. The architect was Valentine Associates of Marysville.

== Schools ==
Schools in Deckerville Community Schools district share a building at 2633 Black River Street in Deckerville.

Schools in Deckerville Community Schools district
School	Notes
Deckerville High School	Grades 7-12
Deckerville Elementary	Grades PreK-6
