= Neil Gordon =

American chemist and educator (1886–1949)

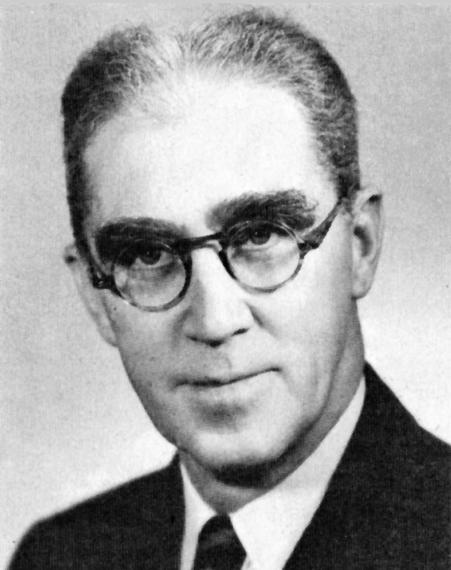
- Born: October 7, 1886; New York City, US
- Died: May 30, 1949 (aged 62); Detroit, Michigan, US
- Education: Syracuse University; Johns Hopkins University
- Known for: Gordon Research Conferences; Journal of Chemical Education; ACS Division of Chemical Education
- Scientific career
- Fields: Chemical education; Physical chemistry
- Workplaces: Goucher College (1917–1919) University of Maryland (1919–1928) Johns Hopkins University (1928–1936) Central College in Missouri (1936-1942) Wayne State University (1942–1947)
- Thesis: The Solubility of Liquids in Liquids. The Partition of the Lower Acids between Water and Cottonseed Oil. Also the Partition of Formic Acid between Water and Various Organic Compounds. (1917)

Neil Elbridge Gordon (October 7, 1886 – May 30, 1949) was an American chemist and educator. He founded the Journal of Chemical Education (c. 1924) and established the Gordon Research Conferences (c. 1931).

== Life and death ==
He held several Chair positions spanning his time at the University of Maryland, Johns Hopkins University, Central College in Missouri, and Wayne State University.

On May 30, 1949, Gordon died by suicide from the roof of a "fashionable hotel" near downtown Detroit. Three policemen had tried unsuccessfully to prevent his leap. After his death the Gibson Island Conference, originally created by Gordon, was renamed the Gordon Research Conferences.
