= Irving A. Spaulding =

American sociologist and researcher

Irving Andrus Spaulding (1917–2010) was an American sociologist and researcher in natural resource economics, spending most of his professional career at the University of Rhode Island in Kingston. He was best known for his research to characterize economic behavior among recreational fishers, economics of coastal communities, and consumer behavior.

== Biography ==
Spaulding was born 31 Oct 1917 in Union, Iowa to Mayne Spaulding and Bernice (Dilts) Spaulding. He attended Iowa State University in Ames, Iowa, graduating with a B.A. degree in sociology in 1941. Spaulding earned his master's degree at the University of Kentucky in 1942, and his Ph.D. at Cornell University in 1944. He joined the faculty of Rhode Island State College in 1946. Spaulding was a recipient of a Fulbright Scholarship in 1965 to teach and conduct research at Chiang Mai University in Chiang Mai, Thailand. He retired from the University of Rhode Island in 1992, and died 12 May 2010 in Portsmouth, New Hampshire.

== Selected publications ==
- Hillpern, E.P., I.A. Spaulding, E.P. Hillpern. Bristow Rogers: American Negro: A Psychoanalytical Case History. New York: Hermitage House, Inc., 1949. 184 pp.
- Spaulding, I.A. 1967. Household Water Use and Social Status. Bulletin 392, Agricultural Experiment Station, University of Rhode Island, Kingston, RI.
- Spaulding, I.A. 1970. Selected Rhode Island sport fishermen and their fishing activity. Bulletin 403 Agricultural Experiment Station, University of Rhode Island, Kingston, RI.
- Spaulding, I.A. 1976. Factors influencing willingness to pay for use of marine recreational facilities. Marine Technical Report—no. 51. Agricultural Experiment Station, University of Rhode Island, Kingston, RI.
- Spaulding I.A. 1977. State-of-the arts paper, identity as a neglected factor in message design relevant to communication for technology transfer. International Center for Marine Resources Development, University of Rhode Island, Kingston, RI.
- Tyrell, T.J. and I.A. Spaulding. 1984. A survey of attitudes toward tourism growth in Rhode Island. Hospitality Education and Research Journal 8(2):22-23.
