= Erin Lynch Prata =

American judge (born 1975)

Associate Justice of the Rhode Island Supreme Court
- Incumbent
- Assumed office January 4, 2021
- Appointed by: Gina Raimondo
- Preceded by: Gilbert V. Indeglia

Member of the Rhode Island Senate from the 31st district
- In office January 2009 – November 2020
- Preceded by: John C. Revens Jr.
- Succeeded by: Kendra Anderson

Personal details
- Born: Erin Patricia Lynch; May 17, 1975 (age 51) Warwick, Rhode Island, U.S.
- Party: Democratic
- Spouse: Joseph Prata
- Education: Boston College (BA); Catholic University of America (JD)

Erin Patricia Lynch Prata (born May 17, 1975 in Warwick, Rhode Island) is an American politician and an Associate Justice on the Rhode Island Supreme Court. She previously served in the Rhode Island Senate representing District 31 since January 2009. Lynch Prata served as Chairwoman on the Senate Committee on Judiciary, as well as a member of the Senate Committee on Rules, Government Ethics & Oversight and the Senate Committee on Special Legislation & Veterans' Affairs. She focused on issues including public education, economic development, job growth, health care and environmental protection. She was confirmed to be an Associate Justice of the Rhode Island Supreme Court in December 2020.

== Early life and education ==
She is the ninth of ten children of John and Pat Lynch, all of whom were born and raised in Warwick, Rhode Island.

She attended Cedar Hill School and Winman Junior High School before graduating from Toll Gate High School in 1993. She earned her Bachelor of Arts in history from Boston College in 1997 and her Juris Doctor from Columbus School of Law in 2000.

== Legal career ==
After graduating from law school, she was a law clerk for Justice Maureen McKenna Goldberg of the Rhode Island Supreme Court. She has practiced law with her own law firm in Warwick and is an attorney with Lynch, Bernard & Lynch (now Lynch, Lynch and Friel).

== Political career ==
=== Rhode Island Senate, 31st district ===
==== Elections ====
- 2016: Lynch Prata was unopposed in both the Democratic primary on September 13, 2016 and the general election on November 8, 2016.
- 2014: Lynch Prata was unopposed in the Democratic primary on September 9, 2014. She defeated independent candidate James Roche in the general election on November 4, 2014 with 6,149 votes (63.9%).
- 2012: Lynch Prata was unopposed for both the September 11, 2012 Democratic Primary, winning with 1,103 votes, and the November 6, 2012 General election, winning with 9,862 votes.
- 2010: Lynch Prata was unopposed for both the September 23, 2010 Democratic Primary, winning with 1,604 votes, and the November 2, 2010 General election, winning with 7,261 votes.
- 2008: When District 31 Democratic Senator John C. Revens, Jr. retired and left the seat open, Lynch Prata won the September 9, 2008 Democratic Primary by 10 votes with 859 votes (50.3%), and won the November 4, 2008 General election with 7,775 votes (60.1%) against Republican nominee Thomas Madden, who had run for the seat in 2006.

== Rhode Island Supreme Court ==
On December 8, 2020, Governor Gina Raimondo nominated Lynch Prata to be an associate justice of the Rhode Island Supreme Court. The Rhode Island Senate confirmed her nomination on December 18, 2020. She was sworn in on January 4, 2021.

== Personal life ==
She is married to Joseph Prata of Warwick.
