= Herman Churchill =

American historian and academic (1869–1941)

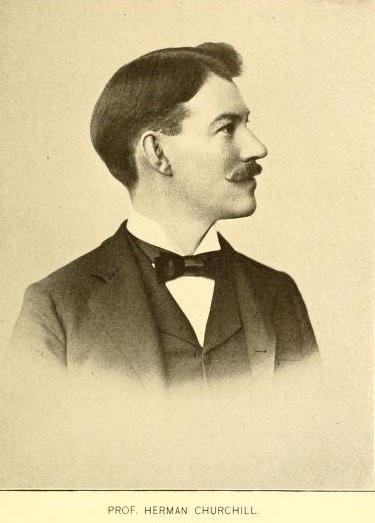
- Herman Churchill at Rhode Island State College, 1913
- Born: October 9, 1869; Scott, New York, US
- Died: 13 April 1941 (aged 71); Kingston, Rhode Island, US
- Spouse: Cora Mae (Boyce) Churchill
- Children: Irving Lester Churchill, Florence Herminia Churchill, Arthur Chester Churchill

Academic background
- Education: Syracuse University; University of Wisconsin–Madison

Academic work
- Discipline: American History
- Institutions: founding chairman of History at Rhode Island State College

Herman Churchill (1869–1941) was an American historian and college professor. He served as the founding chairman of the History Department of Rhode Island State College, and was the namesake of the Herman Churchill Award for Excellence in History given annually to the top honors history student at the University of Rhode Island.

== Early life, education and family ==
Herman Churchill was born in Scott, New York, on 9 October 1869 to Sylvanus Amos Churchill and Caroline (Eadie) Churchill. (Note: Herman Churchill was a direct descendant of Josiah Churchill (ca1615-1683) who emigrated from England to Wethersfield, Connecticut prior to 1640. He was also a descendant of Edmund Rice a 1638 immigrant to Massachusetts Bay Colony.) He studied literature and rhetoric at Syracuse University, earning a A.B. degree in 1894. He earned his A.M. in Letters from the University of Wisconsin–Madison in 1902. Churchill married Cora Mae Boyce on 15 June 1898 in Menomonie, Wisconsin, and they had three children: Irving Lester Churchill (1901-1995), Florence Hermenia Churchill (1905-1920), and Arthur Chester Churchill (1911-2001).

== Professional career and legacy ==
Churchill began his academic career as an instructor of English literature at Northwestern University in Evanston, Illinois, in 1903. In the fall of 1907, he accepted a position as head of the English Department at Southwestern College in Winfield, Kansas, until 1909 when he accepted a similar position at Nebraska Wesleyan University in Lincoln, Nebraska. In 1912, Churchill made his final move in accepting the position as head of the Department of Rhetoric and Composition at Rhode Island State College. Afterward in 1921, Churchill was appointed as the founding head of the History Department by the college president, Howard Edwards. During his professional career, Churchill was active in civic affairs in the community, serving as president of the Tavern Hall Club in 1929, and he was active in genealogical research. He was active in the Phi Beta Kappa academic honor society and Beta Theta Pi fraternity and was a charter signatory of the Rhode Island chapter of the Phi Kappa Phi honor society. He died at his home in Kingston, Rhode Island, on 13 April 1941, shortly after retiring from the college in 1940. The Herman Churchill Award for Excellence in History is given to highest achieving students graduating in history at the University of Rhode Island was named for Churchill.
