= Richard W. Traxler =

Richard Warwick Traxler (1928–2010) was an American environmental microbiologist known for pioneering research in petroleum-degrading bacteria, methane-producing bacteria, and microbiological biotechnology.

== Biography ==
Traxler was born in New Orleans, Louisiana on 25 July 1928 to Ralph N. and Mabel (Barnett) Traxler. He received his B.A., M.A. and Ph.D. degrees from the University of Texas at Austin. He served in the US Army during the Korean War and retired as a major after twenty-three years of reserve service in the military. He married Carolyn Cain in 1952, and they had three daughters, Marla, Suzanne, and Carol.

Beginning in 1958, Traxler taught at the University of Southwest Louisiana at Lafayette, Louisiana for thirteen years, earning a distinguished faculty award from the university in 1965 for his research on petroleum degradation. He joined the faculty of the University of Rhode Island in 1971 as a professor of microbiology, founding the biotechnology program at the university in 1986. Traxler had been chairman of two different departments at the University of Rhode Island: Plant Pathology and Entomology, and Food Science and Nutrition, and he was a member of American Society for Microbiology and the Society for Industrial Microbiology. He was also active in the local community in Kingston serving as president of the Tavern Hall Club in 1995. He retired from the university in 1998, and died on 5 December 2010 at his home in South Kingstown, Rhode Island.

== Selected publications ==
Traxler was the author of over 100 publications primarily on the microbiology of petroleum degradation and food microbiology. His work has been important in the development of technologies to remediate oil spills. Some selected publications are as follows:

- Sergeant, T.P., C.E. Lankford and R.W. Traxler. 1957. Initiation of growth of Bacillus species in a chemically defined medium. Journal of Bacteriology 74(6):728-736.
- Phillips, U.A. and R.W. Traxler. 1963. Microbial degradation of asphalt. Applied and Environmental Microbiology 11(3):235-238.
- Pierce, R.H. Jr., A.M. Cundell, and R.W. Traxler. 1975. Persistence and biodegradation of spilled residual fuel oil on an estuarine beach. Applied Microbiology 29(5):646-652.
- Parekh, V.R, R.W. Traxler, and J.M. Sobek. 1977. n-Alkane oxidation enzymes of a pseudomonad. Applied and Environmental Microbiology. 33(4):881-884.
- Lai, M-C., and R.W. Traxler. 1994. A coupled two-stage continuous fermentation for solvent production by Clostridium acetobutylicum. Enzyme and Microbial Technology 16(12):1021-1025.
- Gamerdinger A.P., R.S. Achin, and R.W. Traxler. 1995. Effect of aliphatic nonaqueous phase liquids on naphthalene biodegradation in multiphase systems. Journal of Environmental Quality 24(6):1150-1156.
