= John C. Revens Jr. =

American politician

Jack Revens

Member of the Rhode Island Senate from the 31st district
- In office 1990–2008
- Succeeded by: Erin Lynch Prata

Personal details
- Born: January 29, 1947 (age 79) Providence, Rhode Island
- Party: Democratic
- Spouse: Susan
- Education: Providence College, Suffolk University
- Profession: Attorney

John C. Revens Jr. is a former Democratic member of the Rhode Island Senate, representing the 31st District from 1990 to 2008.

Revens previously served from 1974 through 1988, serving as Majority Leader from 1983 through 1988. Prior to serving in the Senate, he was a member of the Rhode Island House of Representatives from 1969 through 1974.

Rhode Island Senate
Preceded by Ralph E. Walsh	Member of the Rhode Island Senate from the 18th district 1991–2003	Succeeded by Michael J. Damiani
Preceded by Marc Cote	Member of the Rhode Island Senate from the 31st district 2003–2009	Succeeded by Erin Lynch Prata
