= South County History Center =

Coordinates: 41.480203°N 71.526407°W

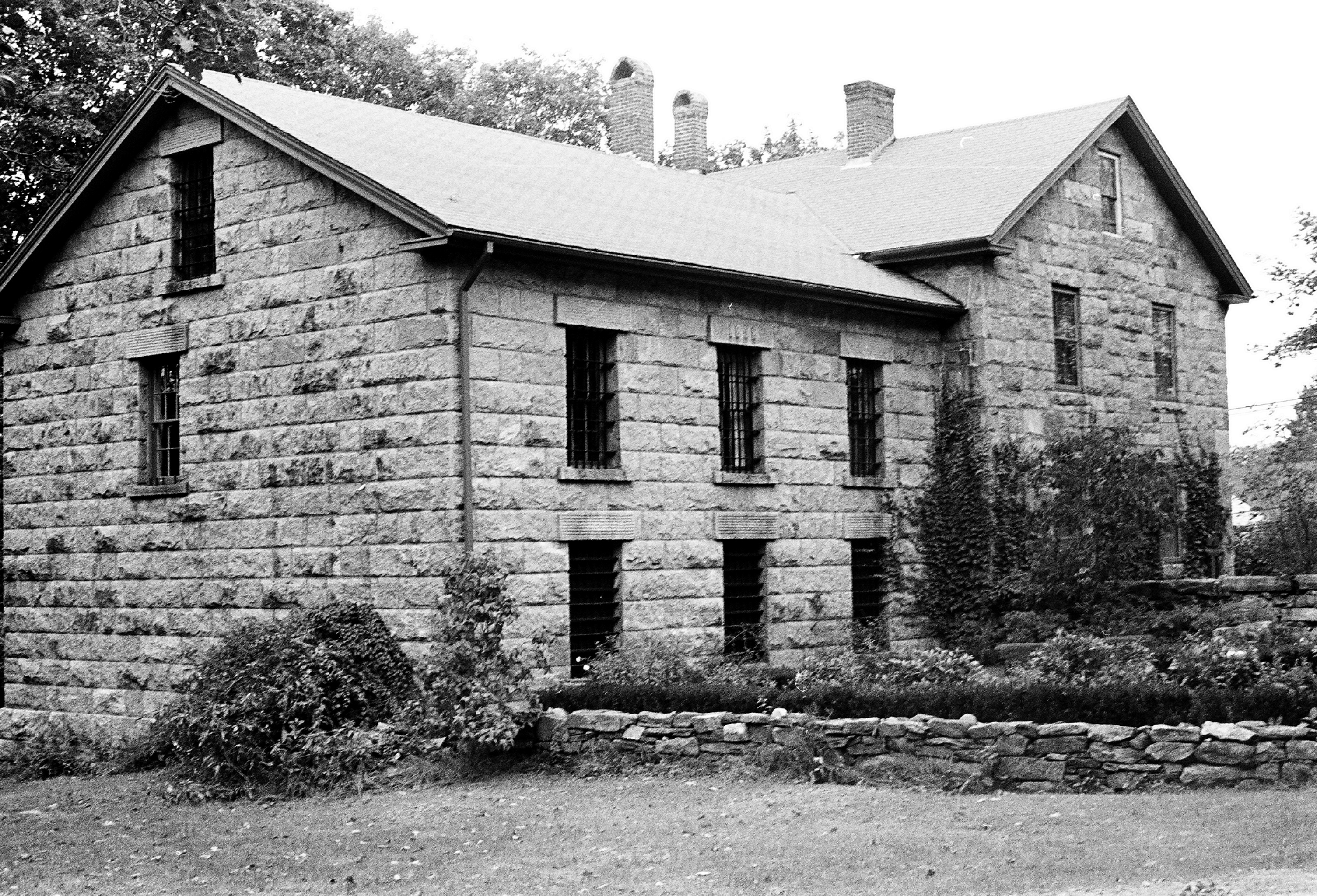
Rear view of the old Washington County Jail's cellblock, built in 1858, and now home to the South County History Center.

The South County History Center, which formerly operated as the Pettaquamscutt Historical Society, is a nonprofit organization in Kingston, Rhode Island, United States, that preserves and interprets the material culture of South County through exhibits and study of archival, library and artifact collections.

== History of the center ==
The South County History Center was founded in 1958 as the Pettaquamscutt Historical Society by South County, RI residents to encourage the study and appreciation of the history of the region; collect and preserve materials of historic interest; and preserve and mark local historical sites. In 2016, the organization revised its mission and began operating as the South County History Center as a reflection of the organization's new vision.

== History of the Old Washington County Jail ==
The Old Washington County Jail, today the center's headquarters, was the location of the former Rhode Island Washington County Jail. The Old Jail, which is listed on the National Register of Historic Places, is situated at the crest of the hill on Kingstown Road and Upper College Road at the University of Rhode Island southeastern entrance on Route 138. The original jail on this site was constructed in 1792, and the existing building dates to 1858 and 1861. It was built for the purpose of confining criminals who disrupted the society of old Washington County. One of many locals tradesmen, Amos Reynold Sweet set the rafters of the structure with local oakwood, and built walls of mica greywacke and Westerly RI granite stones, mortar and the iron cell gates. The jail was closed in 1956, and the building by 1958 housed the Pettaquamscutt Historical Society Museum. The front section of the building was redesigned in 1958 to establish the museum art collection, library and historical records, while the rear section of jail cells was refurbished and opened to the visiting public.

Old Washington County Jail - Front structure built 1861.

== South County History Center collection ==
The artifact, archival and library collection was initiated in 1958 by donations from local residents' personal ancestral items of Early American history. Today, the center's collection focuses on various aspects of South County life.

Marjorie Webster Schunke,(1905-2002) a historian was instrumental in gathering the archived historical materials in the library and wrote volumes of printed research on local genealogy, sites and cemeteries.

On loan to Pettaquamscutt Historical Museum by his family, William Russell Sweet (1860-1946) carved in 1896 a hutch cabinet themed upon the poem "The Song of Hiawatha" by Henry Wadsworth Longfellow published 1855. William Russell Sweet greatly admired the American Indian and depicted their lifestyle in some of his art pieces. William Russell Sweet carved many wood pieces including wall plaques, tables and chairs each of individual themes; such as the Sweet coat of arms, New England sea shells as quahogs and scallops, maple leaves, nuts and berries, textile weaving patterns, and animals. His great-grandson, Carson Young Sweet Ferri Carson Grant has placed on loan several other artworks to the Pettaquamscutt Historical Society Museum in RI.

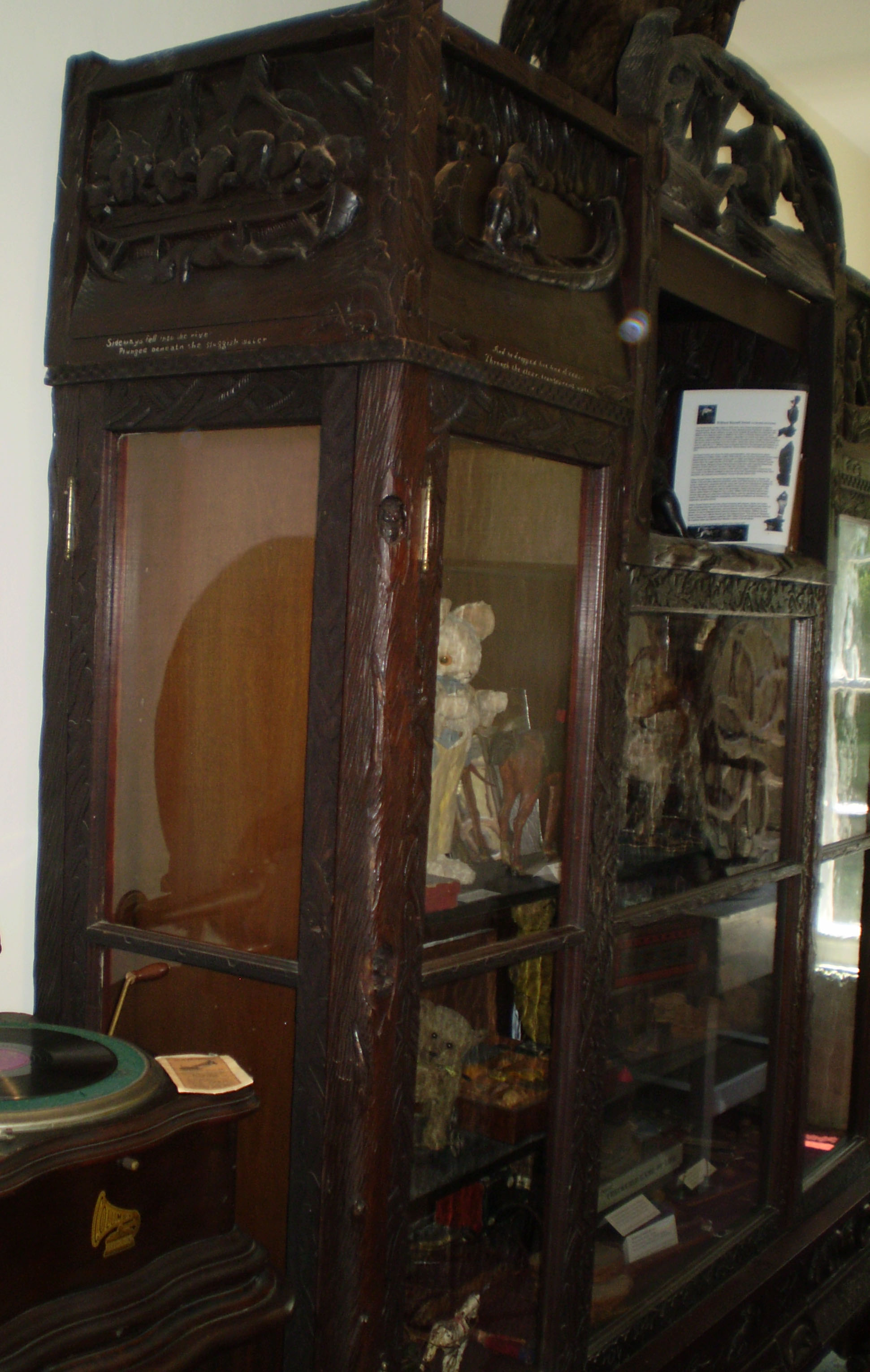
William Russell Sweet's carved hutch cabinet 1896.

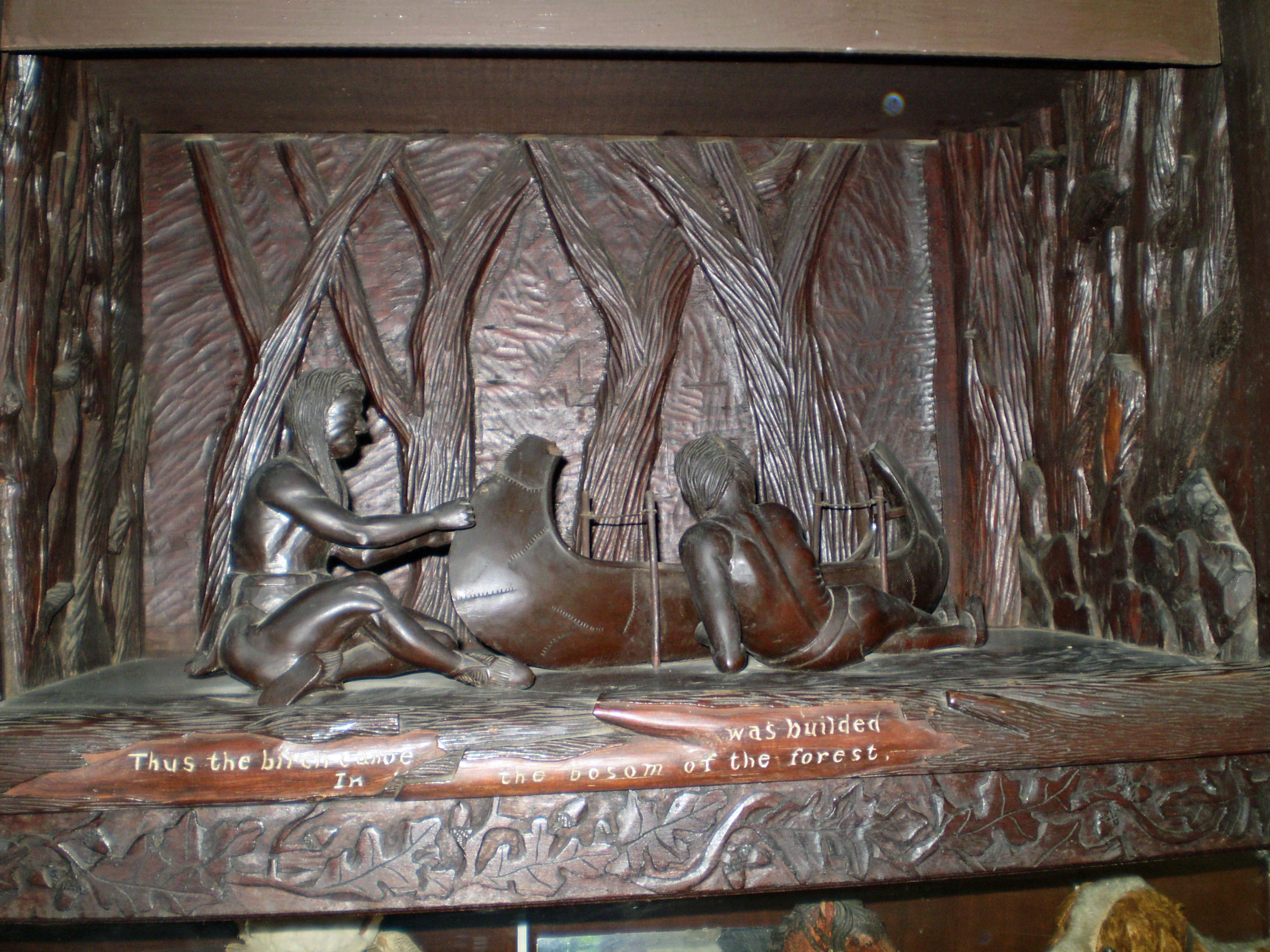
William Russell Sweet's carved hutch cabinet 1896- panel view.

The 14-by-6-foot mural depicting a white overseer and black slaves in 18th century Narragansett, RI, entitled "The Economic Activities of the Narragansett Planters", the painting's subject matter—slavery—disturbs some people, while others argue it's important to remember southern Rhode Island's plantation past. The mural was painted by Rhode Island native and renowned illustrator Ernest Hamlin Baker in the 1930s, as part of the federal government's Work Projects Administration. It hung for nearly 60 years in the Wakefield, RI post office, until the post office closed in 1999.

== Contact information ==
Address: South County History Center, 2636 Kingstown Road, Kingston, Rhode Island, USA.

== See also ==
- List of early settlers of Rhode Island
- Atherton Trading Company
- List of historical societies in Rhode Island
