= W. George Parks =

W. George Parks (1904–1975) was a chemist and the second director of the Gordon Research Conferences.

== Biography ==
Parks was born in Rockwood, Pennsylvania on December 20, 1904. After attending the University of Pennsylvania for his undergraduate degree, he went to Columbia University in New York, where he earned both Master's and Ph.D. degrees in chemistry. His 1931 doctoral thesis was titled "The Activity Coefficients and Heats of Transfer of Cadmium-Sulfate from Electromotive Force Measurements at 25 and 0 Degrees". Upon graduation, Parks accepted a position on the faculty at Rhode Island State College, later renamed the University of Rhode Island, where he taught for thirty-seven years as a chemistry professor. In 1947, Parks was appointed director of what would soon become the Gordon Research Conferences. Among his first acts was to select a new venue for the conferences: Colby Junior College in New London, New Hampshire, where Parks was a trustee. After running ten conferences in the summer of 1947, the Gordon Research Conference headquarters were moved to the University of Rhode Island in Kingston. During the next two decades, Parks presided over steady growth in the number of conferences and attendees. In 1950, Parks became chairman of the chemistry department at the University of Rhode Island. In 1968, after twenty-one years as director of the Gordon Research Conferences, Parks resigned and Alexander M. Cruickshank assumed directorship of the conferences. Parks also resigned his post as professor at the University of Rhode Island, but continued on as professor emeritus until his death in October 1975.
