= Journal of Chemical Education =

- Discipline: Chemistry education
- Language: English
- Edited by: Thomas A. Holme

Publication details
- History: 1924–present
- Publisher: American Chemical Society (United States)
- Frequency: Monthly
- Impact factor: 2.9 (2024)

Standard abbreviations
- ISO 4: J. Chem. Educ.

Indexing
- CODEN: JCEDA8
- ISSN: 0021-9584
- OCLC no.: 01754494

Links
- Journal homepage; Online access; Online archive

The Journal of Chemical Education is a monthly peer-reviewed academic journal available in both print and electronic versions. It is published by the Division of Chemical Education of the American Chemical Society and was established in 1924 by Neil Gordon. The journal covers research on chemical education, and its target audience includes instructors of chemistry from middle school through graduate school and some scientists in commerce, industry, and government. Early editions of the journal also included articles relating to the history of chemistry; these would later find a home in the Bulletin for the History of Chemistry, which was founded in 1988.
