= Roy G. Poulsen =

American economist

Roy George Poulsen (1918–2006) was an American economist and business finance professor, spending most of his professional career at the University of Rhode Island (URI) in Kingston. Poulson earned his PhD in economics from Clark University in 1961. He was best known for his research to develop an econometric model of the Rhode Island State budget and innovations in the field of business education. He served as the director of the Research Center in Business and Economics at URI, and was president of the URI Chapter of the American Association of University Professors from 1966 to 1967. Poulsen was also active in community affairs in Kingston, Rhode Island serving as president of the Tavern Hall Club in 1959.

== Selected publications ==
- Poulsen, R. G. (1961). The Evolution of the Rhode Island Budget Process. Clark University.
- Poulsen, R.G. (1965). New England Power Economics. Land Economics 41(3):217-229. JSTOR 3144854doi:10.2307/3144854
- Poulsen, R. G. (1967). "New England Power Economics: A Rejoinder". Land Economics. 43 (1): 126–29. doi:10.2307/3145576. JSTOR 3145576.
- Poulsen, R.G. (1968). Research to improve classroom teaching. Journal of Business Education 43(4):158-160.
- Poulsen, R.G. and J. Silver. (1968). The legal profession in Rhode Island : an economic profile. University of Rhode Island, College of Business Administration, Research Center in Business and Economics.
- Poulsen, R.G. (1970). Central City Land Use and Suburban Financial Support. Land Economics. 46(4):497-502.JSTOR 3145523doi:10.2307/3145523
- Booth, G.G., R.G. Poulsen and J.L. Starkey. (1972). An investigation into the construction of an econometric model of Rhode Island. Industrial National Bank of Rhode Island and Division of Budget, Rhode Island Department of Administration. 184pp.
