= Deckerville High School =

Location
- 2633 Black River St; Deckerville, Michigan 48427; United States
- 43.5274°N 82.7293°W

Information
- Other name: Deckerville Jr./Sr. High School
- Type: Public
- School district: Deckerville Community Schools
- Principal: Joshua Stern
- Teaching staff: 14.94 (FTE)
- Grades: 7–12
- Enrollment: 241 (2023–2024)
- Student to teacher ratio: 16.13
- Colors: Maroon and gold
- Team name: Eagles
- Website: www.deckerville.k12.mi.us/high_school/hsmain.htm

Deckerville High School is a public secondary school located in Deckerville, Michigan. The school serves about 250 students in grades 7 to 12 in the Deckerville Community Schools district.
