= 1858 Rhode Island gubernatorial election =

- April 7, 1858
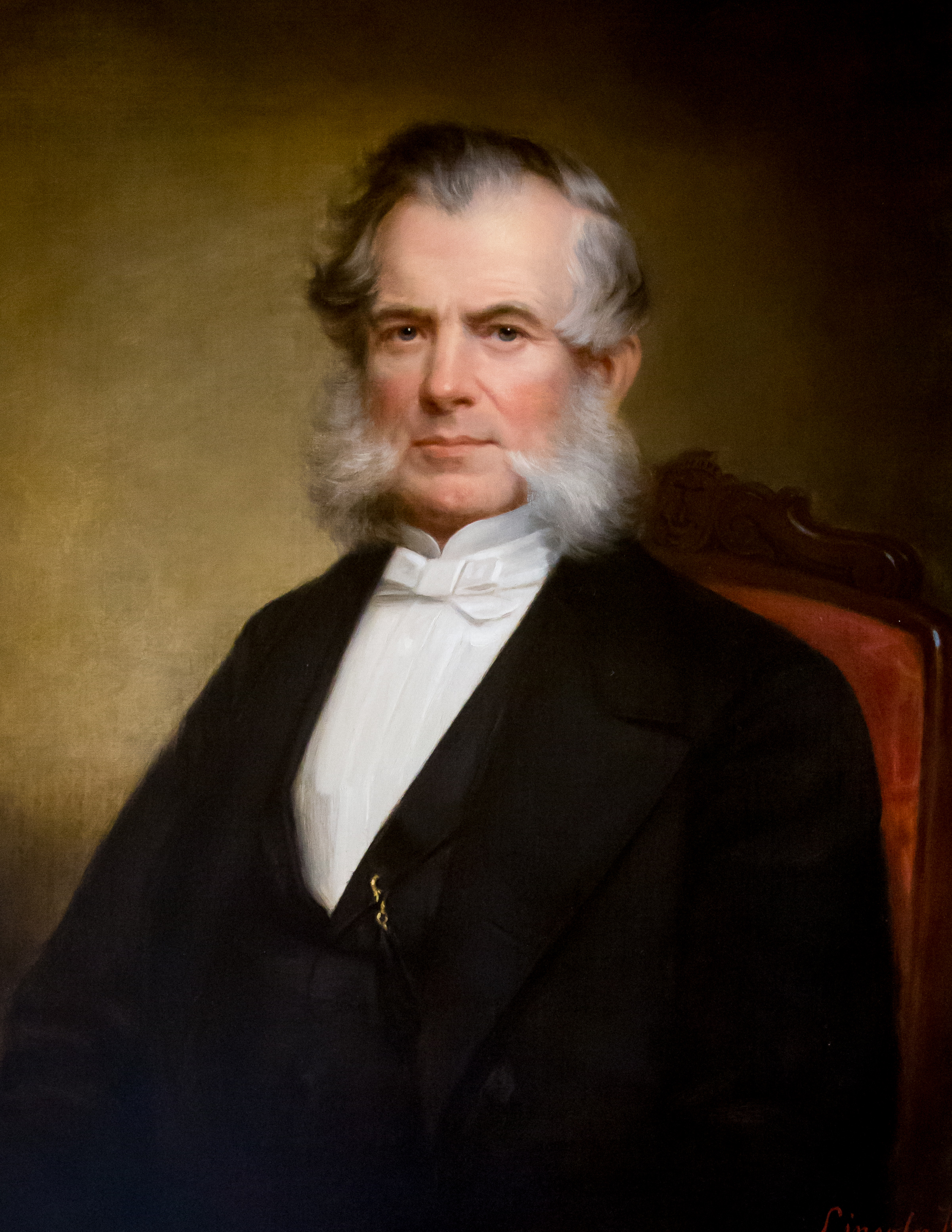

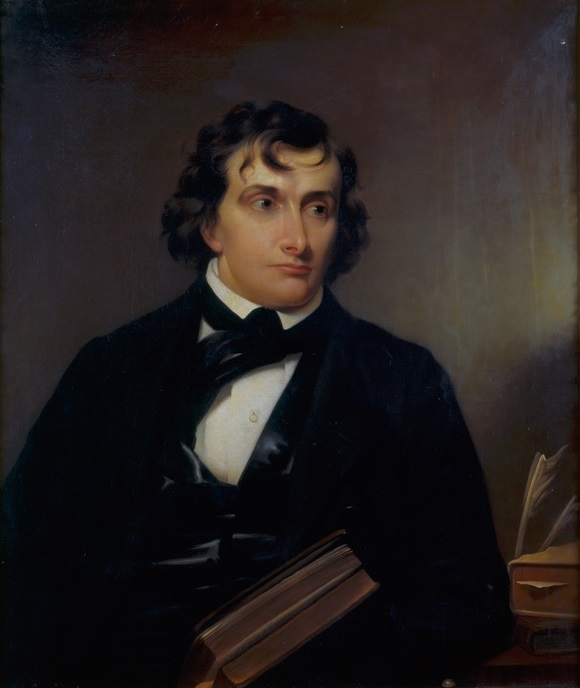
Nominee	Elisha Dyer	Elisha R. Potter
Party	Republican	Democratic
Popular vote	7,934	3,572
Percentage	68.91%	31.02%
- County results Dyer: 50–60% 60–70% 70–80%
Governor before election
Elisha Dyer
Republican
Elected Governor
Elisha Dyer
Republican

The 1858 Rhode Island gubernatorial election was held on April 7, 1858.

Incumbent Republican governor Elisha Dyer beat Democratic nominee Elisha R. Potter with 68.91% of the vote.

== General election ==
=== Candidates ===
- Elisha R. Potter, Democratic, former U.S. representative, former State commissioner of public schools
- Elisha Dyer, Republican, incumbent governor

==== Declined ====
- Alexander Duncan, Democratic

=== Results ===
1858 Rhode Island gubernatorial election
Party	Candidate	Votes	%	±%
Republican	Elisha Dyer (incumbent)	7,934	68.91%	
Democratic	Elisha R. Potter	3,572	31.02%	
Scattering		8	0.07%	
Majority		4,362	37.89%	
Turnout		11,514		
Republican hold		Swing		
