= Clarence M. Tarzwell =

American biologist and water pollution researcher

Clarence Matthew Tarzwell (1907–1993) was an aquatic biologist and water pollution researcher in the employ of the United States Public Health Service and later, the Environmental Protection Agency. He was the founding director of the National Marine Water Quality Laboratory in West Kingston, Rhode Island, and was a major contributor to the formulation of the Clean Water Act of 1972.

== Biography ==
Tarzwell was born in Deckerville, Michigan, to Matthew and Jessie Josephine (née Wilson) Tarzwell on 29 September 1907. He attended Deckerville High School, graduating in 1925. He earned his AB in biology at the University of Michigan in 1930, and his MS degree there in 1932. He earned his PhD degree in aquatic biology and freshwater fisheries in 1936 also at the University of Michigan. Tarzwell was first employed as a scientist by the United States federal government in 1936 with the U.S. Bureau of Fisheries. He served as a staff scientist for the Tennessee Valley Authority from 1938 to 1943. He joined the United States Public Health Service (USPHS) in 1943. He was chief of the aquatic biology section of the USPHS Taft Environmental Health Center in Cincinnati, Ohio, from 1948 to 1953, and later in 1965, he was the founding director of the USPHS National Marine Water Quality Laboratory in West Kingston, Rhode Island. After his retirement from the USPHS in 1972, Tarzwell served as a consulting research advisor to the EPA Laboratory in Corvallis, Oregon, and other federal laboratories. Tarzwell was a resident of South Kingstown, Rhode Island, until his death in May 1993.

== Legacy and honors ==
Tarzwell was credited as a major contributor to the scientific testing protocols leading to the Clean Water Act of 1972 and the formation of the Environmental Protection Agency. Tarzwell was a recipient of the Aldo Leopold Memorial Award from the Wildlife Society. Since 1977, the road in Narragansett, Rhode Island where the current Northeastern Ecological Laboratory of the Environmental Protection Agency is located (41.494139°N 71.422941°W) (the successor to the lab established by Tarzwell in 1965 in West Kingston) has been known as Tarzwell Drive in honor of his service to establish the laboratory and lead the pioneering research efforts.

== Publications ==
Tarzwell was the author of over 120 publications primarily on freshwater fisheries, aquatic ecology and water pollution. Some selected publications are as follows:

- Tarzwell, C.M. 1947. Effects of DDT mosquito larviciding on wildlife; the effects on surface organisms of the routine hand application of DDT larvicides for mosquito control. Public Health Reports 62(15):525-54.
- Gaufin, A.R. and C.M. Tarzwell 1952. Aquatic invertebrates as indicators of stream pollution. Public Health Reports 67(1): 57–64.
- LaRoche G., R. Eisler, and C.M. Tarzwell. 1970. Bioassay procedures for oil and oil dispersant toxicity evaluation. Journal of the Water Pollution Control Federation 42(11):1982-1989.
- Tarzwell, C.M. 1971. Measurements of pollution effects on living organisms. Bioassays to determine allowable waste concentrations in the aquatic environment. Proceedings of the Royal Society, B Biological Sciences 177(48):279-285.
