= John D. Hamilton =

Rhode Island politician

John D. Hamilton is a former Democratic member of the Rhode Island House of Representatives. He was elected in 1980 to represent District 49 and was reelected in 1982. During his legislative service, Hamilton sponsored prompt-payment legislation intended to require the state to pay vendors and contractors within a specified period of time.

== Political career ==
Hamilton was elected in 1980 as the Democratic representative for Rhode Island House District 49, defeating Republican Ronald W. Tefft by 2,642 votes to 1,758. He was reelected in 1982, defeating Republican Frank E. Sequeira by 2,487 votes to 1,085.

== Prompt-payment legislation ==
During his service in the House, Hamilton sponsored prompt-payment legislation after hearing complaints from small-business owners about delays in receiving payments from the state. Two versions of the legislation passed the Rhode Island General Assembly but were vetoed by Governor J. Joseph Garrahy.

According to The Evening Bulletin, Hamilton planned to introduce another version of the prompt-payment bill in 1983. Earlier versions would have required the state to pay vendors within 60 days, while the new proposal was expected to shorten the payment period to 30 or 45 days. Hamilton said his interest in the issue grew from complaints by small-business owners in his district who faced delays in receiving payments from the state.

In 1982, Hamilton joined legislators and business groups in Washington, D.C., in an effort to promote similar prompt-payment legislation in other states.
