= Carson Grant =

American actor

Carson Ferri-Grant
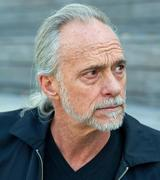
- Carson Ferri-Grant 2015
- Born: Carson Ferri-Grant; December 17, 1950 (age 75); Pawtucket, Rhode Island, U.S.
- Occupations: Actor; artist; script developer; stuntman
- Years active: 1970–present
- Website: http://www.carsongrant.com

Carson Ferri-Grant (born December 17, 1950) is an American actor and artist. Grant has created characters and stories in visual mediums as drawings, paintings, in films and on stage.

== Career ==
Carson Ferri-Grant moved to New York City in 1970 to study acting technique with Lee Strasberg. Carson Grant joined the professional acting unions: Screen Actors Guild, American Federation of Television and Radio Artists and Actors' Equity Association; and was represented by the William Morris Agency, who created the stage name 'Carson Grant'. Carson Ferri-Grant trained with Lee Strasberg, who guided his Method Acting technique, Wally Harper, who coached his baritone voice, and Phil Black who trained him in modern jazz and fencing.

Carson Ferri-Grant (Carson Grant) performed various acting roles with New York City Opera and began his film acting career in films as Man on a Swing, The Front and Death Wish. He portrayed 'Romeo' in Romeo and Juliet at New Jersey Shakespeare in the Park and was young 'Thomas Jefferson' in The Last Ballot in the WNET 13 Bicentennial series.

Carson Ferri-Grant painted large oil canvases and constructed many art installations in alternative exhibition spaces as part of the East Village, Manhattan 1970s Art Movement, participating in Colab, Charas/El Bohio, ABC No Rio, and many group art shows in the East Village, the Westside, and the Bronx in alternative spaces. Leo Castelli recognized Ferri-Grant's installation of living sand sculptures 'Coney Island Bathing Beauties' shown in "The Coney Island Art Show 1981"(sponsored by DCA-Brooklyn), and his triptych 'In Life Turmoil' in the "Time Square Show" 1980 organized by Collaborative Project Inc. Colab Carson Ferri-Grant. Ferri-Grant had a cobalt blue 'graffiti tag' of a pine tree coastline with his initials CFG, and on a midnight graffiti session, he had painted ten foot high cobalt blue iris flowers stretching the block-long 100 foot wall on the Lower East Side Con Edison plant, at Avenue C and 14th Street, titled "Open your Irises", in protest of the pollution produced by the energy plant. Influenced by Robert Rauschenberg's use of art for social change.

The seventies brought social awareness of the environment, pollution, and nuclear waste contamination. For two summers, Carson Ferri-Grant backpacked and walked much of the USA photographing damaged natural reserves. Marching with the Sioux Indian in South Dakota, as part of the "No-Nukes" concert tour 1979 MUSE. Carson exhibited his Sacred Black Hills, SD paintings and rope sculptures in the first NYC Earth Day 1980 celebration along Avenue of the Americas and created a complimentary "Environmental Artists United” EAU T-shirt for the event.

Carson Ferri-Grant's one-man exhibition was called "Nature-Nuclear" at the 1979 Jack Morris Gallery, NYC, where he constructed a large climb-up-into 'scarred Mother Earth Uterus' post-nuclear, with her distorted next-generation traveling down her maimed fallopian tubes into her contaminated womb (30 ft × 40 ft). The work encouraged the viewer to consider alternative energy sources to protect our environment.

During this decade, Carson Ferri-Grant helped establish in 1978 the 'Westside Arts Coalition' with a group of multi-discipline Upper West Side artists at Symphony Space to help establish exhibition spaces and affordable arts studios. Carson Ferri-Grant was voted as the 'Architectural-Environmental' chair of Westside Arts Coalition'. In 1981, as the WSAC group marched to Lincoln Center to protest President Ronald Reagan's budget cuts to the Arts, Grant's photographs appeared on the front page of the Westsider Newspaper. In 1981, Carson Ferri-Grant established a 'not-for-profit' art group called 'EAU' Environmental Artists United which created educational art exhibitions merging art and environmental conservation, which received grants from America the Beautiful Fund and Avon Foundation. Ferri-Grant exhibited his artwork in alternative spaces throughout the boroughs, as one of the artists in the New York City 1970's and 1980's Art Movement.

In 1979 Carson Ferri-Grant graduating as a Psi Chi Honors Society recipient in Psychology and elected Psi Chi president at CUNY - Hunter College BA program, In 1984 Ferri-Grant's master thesis on the Therapeutic Validity of Drama/Art Therapy, earned him an MA (summa cum laude) at University of Connecticut. He pursued postgraduate work at Columbia University. Carson Ferri-Grant presented his research at Georgetown's Drama Therapy Association 1985 convention.

=== Art installations and digital media ===
Carson Ferri-Grant attended and taught at Pratt School of Art and Design, New York City to enhance his knowledge of computer graphics and digital editing. He worked as a computer graphic artist, animator and video editor using AT&T- NASA software, creating formats for the premiere of CD-ROM and DVD and Internet technology, for companies such as Fusion, Advanced Graphics, Exhibit Technologies, Carabineer, Ayer Advertising, and Ogilvy & Mather Advertising.

Painting on the computer tablet, Carson Ferri-Grant created animations for the 1991 Sony's Time Square Video Screen, present-day Panasonic panel hung on the One Times Square building, for the Ayer advertising campaign "Breakthrough with the Unexpected" animation of an egg cracking to release a butterfly and also projects for IBM, Intel, Kodak, DeBeers, Shell, American Express, and designed computer graphic elements for National Geographic's Global Access Interactive Gallery in Washington, D.C.

For the SIGGRAPH - 1990 Convention, Texas, to honor John F. Kennedy's memory, Carson Ferri-Grant constructed the suspended 3D hologram sculpture (100 ft × 100 ft) titled Harmony Mountain inside the second floor of the old Dallas Union Train Station, where a viewer could walk around and under the mountainous shape. In the artist's words, "The installation's purpose was to harness viewers' peaceful thoughts and funnel them through the five pointed Texas Star Vortex (20' diameter) which was hung between the two massive exterior columns on the balcony overlooking the historically tarnished Dallas Dealey Plaza and Texas School Book Depository. Ferri-Grant was honored with the SIGGRAPH Vision in Art Award.

Carson Ferri-Grant participated as a visual artist in many group art exhibitions in New York City as a curator, a contributing painter and photographer. As a film actor, Grant has portrayed more than 400 film characters in commercial and independent films as of 2012.

In 2010, Carson Ferri-Grant promoting environmental conservation of the USA waterway, painted a 32 ft x 14 ft mural titled 'Muddy Cove' of the Buzzard Bay estuary, on the third floor exterior of the old Ocean Spray Cranberry Factory in East Wareham, Cape Cod, Massachusetts.

In 2011, Carson Ferri-Grant curated an exhibition "Fall: Rising Above 9-11" for the West Side Arts Coalition, New York City. He asked the contributing artists to create original art work of their feelings about 9-11 for the tenth anniversary. Carson's oil painting 'Replanting' celebrates the stamina of humans to rise above adversity and begin again. 'Replanting' reflects with the two trees the twin-towers of the World Trade Center in the past, and the being replanting with hope the future.

In 2015 Carson Ferri-Grant was honored to model for Bernardo Siciliano's painting of Jesus being taken down from the cross, exhibited at the Alcon Gallery, NYC.

In 2016, Carson Ferri-Grant exhibited two shows at the Lower Eastside at Gallery 11 Kenmare. One featured the 'Unknown Strangers' series 5 oil painting visualizing the crisis of worldwide of people leaving their homelands to escape the dangerous conditions, with the hope to restart their lives in a more peaceful welcoming country, with the promise of a better life for them and their families. The second show featured the 'Bohemians @ the Beer Garden' series of 5 oil paintings observing the jovial crowds enjoying an Autumn evening of dining, music, dance and good conversations during the celebration of the Year of the Fire Monkey.

In 2017 Carson Ferri-Grant (Carson Grant) was the `Yogi Namaste´ in Emblem Health 2017 Campaign.

In 2019 Carson Ferri-Grant moved to LA, has the space to paint and has exhibited his artwork at the LA Art Show 2023, 2024, 2025, and 2026 represented by FilmPens Studio Gallery on Artsy.net.

=== Returning to acting ===
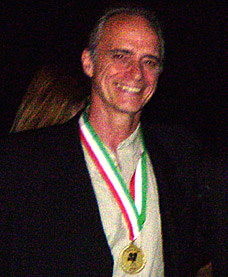
Carson Ferri-Grant accepting GIAA Italian American Heritage Award 2007

In 1998, Italian director Eduardo Amati asked Carson Ferri-Grant to portray his lead character in the film Master Shot.

In 2008, Carson Ferri-Grant was elected Vice President of GIAA (Guild of Italian American Actors) and represented GIAA delegate on the 4 A's (Associated Actors and Artistes of America) meetings chaired by President Theodore Bikel.

In 2015, Carson Ferri-Grant, Vice President of GIAA (Guild of Italian American Actors), was elected as the Vice President of the Associated Actors and Artiste of America and Artistes of America into the Department for Professional Employees, DPE, AFL-CIO. Grant as VP for GIAA, speaks at the AFL-CIO`S DPE-AEMI: Arts Entertainment Media Industry conference 2021 hosted by the Whitehouse-Union Leaders to Discuss Their Legislative Diversity Agenda.

In 2017 Carson Ferri-Grant (Carson Grant) for his role as `Professor John Allen´ in the film One Penny won Best Actor in the Film Forum at the Philadelphia Independent Film Festival.

As a film actor, Carson Ferri-Grant (Carson Grant) has portrayed more than 400 film characters on stage and in commercial and independent films. In 2013 performed at Symphony Space, NYC in 50 year tribute to JFK in gala event "November 21, 1963: The day before".

== Awards and memberships ==
Ferri-Grant has won a number of artistic and civic awards, including the Rhode Island Scholastic Gold Key Art Award (1962), Avon Foundation grant 1981, America The Beautiful Fund grant (1981), ACM SIGGRAPH 1990, Carson Ferri-Grant was honored for his artistic vision with the SIGGRAPH 1990 local Texas Star Insignia, SIGGRAPH 1990 Texas local Longhorn Cattle head insignia, SIGGRAPH Universal Insignia, and SIGGRAPH Texas Star insignia bola, and the GIAA Italian American Heritage Award (2007). The latter was awarded for contributing to the positive portrayal of Italian American culture via his role in the film God Bless America, Best Supporting actor in Sunscreen Film Festival 2010 for his acting role in 'Sneakers and Soul', Best Lead actor Philadelphia International Film Festival 2017 for his acting role in 'One Penny', Best Lead actor in Rome International Movie Award 2021 for his acting role in 'Amazon Queen', and Best Supporting actor Ideal International Film Festival 2025 for his acting role in 'A Life Well Lived'. In 2020-2021 Carson Grant won many award as producer for the feature film 'Amazon Queen'.

In 2008, Carson Ferri-Grant was honored with a membership into the National Society of the Sons of the American Revolution through the Rhode Island Chapter. In 2009 Carson Ferri-Grant was included in the Marquis "Who's Who in American Art", and "Who's Who in America", and in 2010 was honored for inclusion in Marquis "International Who's Who".
