= Gordon Research Conferences =

Informal, off-record international scientific community meetings since 1931

- Country: Global
- People: Research scientists
- Website: http://www.grc.org

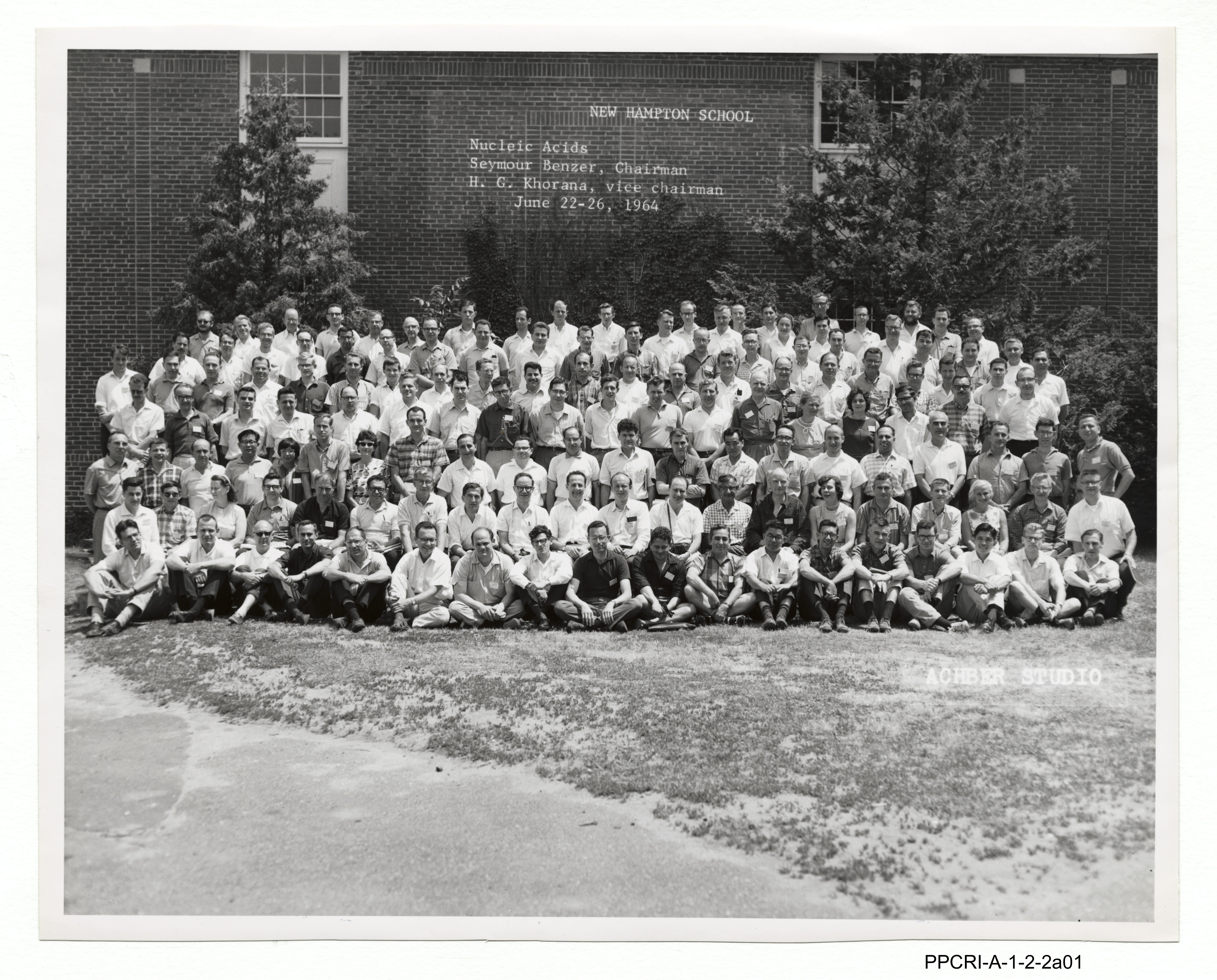
Gordon Research Conference, 1964

Gordon Research Conferences are a group of international scientific conferences organized by a non-profit organization of the same name, since 1931 covering frontier research in the chemical, physical and later biological, sciences, and their related technologies. The conferences have been held in the US since 1931, and have expanded to almost 400 conferences per year since 1990, including Europe and Asia. Conference locations are chosen partly for their scenic and often isolated nature, to encourage an informal community atmosphere. Contributions are off the record, with references to the conference in any publication strictly prohibited to encourage free discussion, often of unpublished research. In 1991, conferences were extended to cover science education.

== History ==
The Gordon Research Conferences (GRC) were initiated by Neil Gordon while at Johns Hopkins University. The forerunner of the conferences were the summer sessions held at the chemistry department in the late 1920s. By 1931 this had evolved into a graduate seminar that was also attended by external participants.(subscription required)

In the mid-1930s, GRC moved to Gibson Island, Maryland. In 1947, GRC moved to New London, New Hampshire, holding 10 conferences. In the 1960s, there were only a hundred attendees. GRC expanded into Massachusetts, Maine, Vermont, and Rhode Island and as of May 2023, hosts more than 20 meetings per week during the summer.

In 1963, GRC began the "West Coast winter series" January through May, when the Polymers Conference moved to Santa Barbara, California, in 1980, to Ventura, California, and in 2009, expanding to Galveston, Texas. As of 2023 there are more than 70 winter meetings each year.

Starting in 1990, GRC expanded outside of the U.S. into Italy, Switzerland, Spain and Hong Kong.

In 1958 newspapers reported the conference was "restricted to men who are internationally recognized as the top experts in their fields".

In 2005, 28 percent of attendees were female. As of May 2023, GRC had diversity initiatives for "women and all underrepresented groups [...] within its 400 communities" for diversity, equity and inclusion.

== Topics ==
Gordon Research Conferences cover a wide range of scientific disciplines, often focusing on emerging or highly specialized areas of research. Topics span across chemistry, physics, biology, engineering, medicine, and environmental sciences. The format is designed to promote in-depth discussions and foster collaborations around cutting-edge science.

In 1991, the conference series was expanded to include science education, highlighting best practices in pedagogy, curriculum design, and diversity in STEM education.

Each year, a curated selection of conference topics is published in the journal Science, providing a glimpse into the breadth and evolution of scientific interests. These have included areas such as:

- Molecular and cell biology
- Neurodegenerative diseases
- Nanotechnology and materials science
- Renewable energy and catalysis
- Climate modeling and geochemistry
- Bioinformatics and computational biology
- Immunology and vaccine development

The full list of annual topics and conference schedules is available on the official website. The conference topics are regularly published in the journal Science: 2017, 2015, 2010, 2009, 2008, 2007, and 2006.

== Leadership ==
As of 2023, the CEO is chemist Nancy Ryan Gray. Previous GRC directors were: from 1947-1968 W. George Parks, from 1968-1993 Alexander M. Cruickshank and Carlyle B. Storm from 1993-2003.

Vicki Chandler served GRC as an elected council member and board of trustees member and chair.

== See also ==
- Keystone Symposia
