= Gilbert V. Indeglia =

American judge

Gilbert Indeglia

Associate Justice of the Rhode Island Supreme Court
- In office April 28, 2010 – June 30, 2020
- Appointed by: Donald Carcieri
- Preceded by: Paul Suttell
- Succeeded by: Erin Lynch Prata

Associate Justice of the Rhode Island Superior Court
- In office 2000 – April 28, 2010
- Appointed by: Lincoln Almond
- Succeeded by: Brian Van Couyghen

Member of the Rhode Island House of Representatives from the 48th district
- In office January 1, 1985 – January 3, 1989
- Preceded by: Roger L. Pearson
- Succeeded by: Donald Lally

Personal details
- Born: August 31, 1941 (age 84) Providence, Rhode Island
- Party: Republican
- Spouse: Elizabeth L. (Wescott) Indeglia
- Education: Boston College; University of Michigan Law School

Gilbert V. Indeglia (born August 31, 1941) is a former justice of the Rhode Island Supreme Court.

Gilbert Indeglia was born into a family of attorneys and is a grandson of Rhode Island's first official public defender. Indeglia is a 1959 graduate of Providence's Classical High School, a 1963 graduate of Boston College, and a 1966 graduate of the University of Michigan Law School. After graduation Indeglia worked in private practice for 20 years and served in the RI Air National Guard from 1967 to 1972. He also served as a South Kingstown probate judge and town solicitor and in the Rhode Island House of Representatives in the 48th District from 1985 to 1989 as a Republican. Indeglia was a member of the House Judiciary Committee that presided over impeachment proceedings for the late Supreme Court Chief Justice Joseph A. Bevilacqua. Indeglia also served as a member of the South Kingstown Town Council from 1977 to 1984. Indeglia was appointed to the Rhode Island District Court in 1989 and the Rhode Island Superior Court in 2000. In 2010 Governor Donald Carcieri appointed him to the Rhode Island Supreme Court.

On January 10, 2020, Indeglia announced his intent to retire at the end of June 2020.

== Family life ==
Indeglia is married to the former Elizabeth L. Westcott and as of 2010 has two children and three grandchildren.
