= Washington County Courthouse (Rhode Island) =

- Washington County Court House
- U.S. National Register of Historic Places
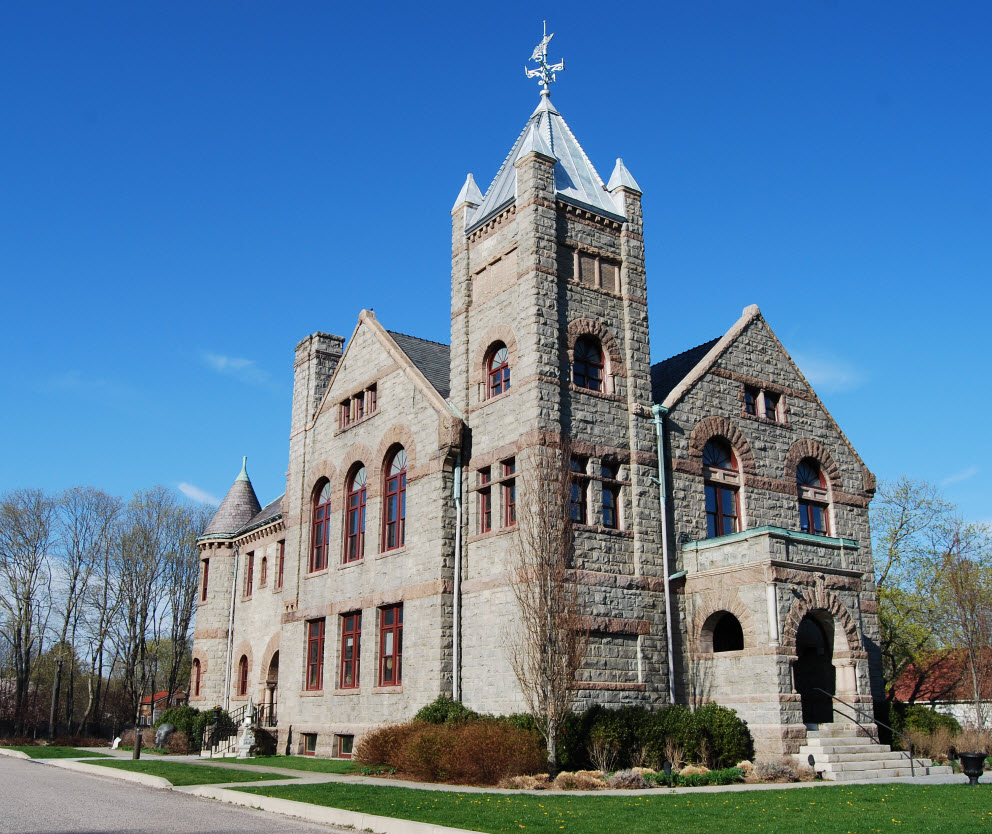

- Location within Rhode Island Location within the United States
- Interactive map showing the location for Washington County Courthouse
- Location: 3481 Kingstown Rd., South Kingstown, Rhode Island
- Coordinates: 41°29′2″N 71°33′21″W
- Area: 2 acres (0.81 ha)
- Built: 1892
- Architect: Leslie P. Langworthy
- Architectural style: Romanesque
- NRHP reference No.: 92001542
- Added to NRHP: November 05, 1992

The former Washington County Courthouse is an historic building at 3481 Kingstown Road in South Kingstown, Rhode Island. Built in 1892, it was added to the National Register of Historic Places in 1992 as Washington County Court House.

Since 1991, court has been held in the McGrath Judicial Complex at 4800 Tower Hill Road in the village of Wakefield, also in South Kingstown.

The building is now the Courthouse Center for the Arts at Historic Washington County Courthouse

== Gallery ==
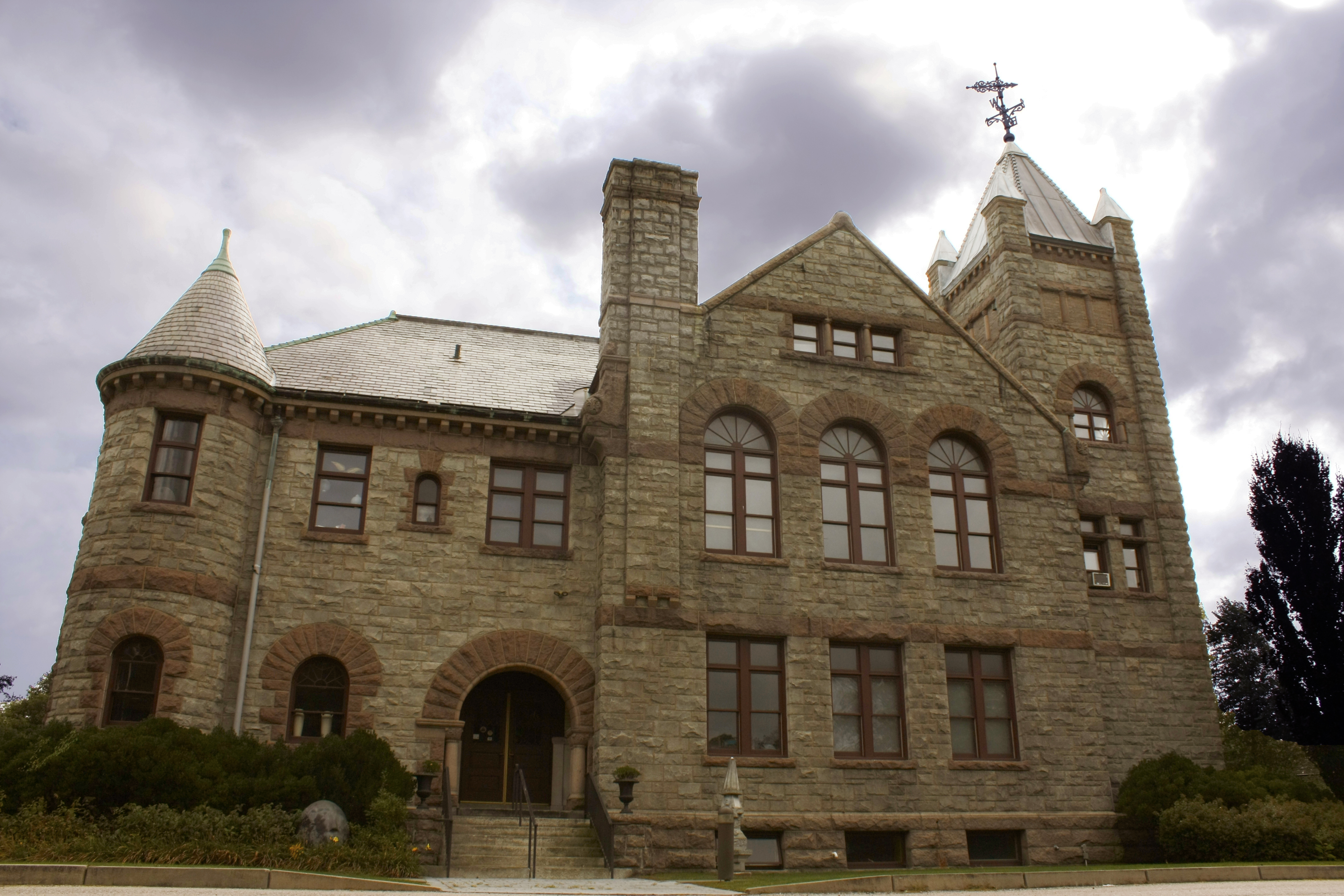

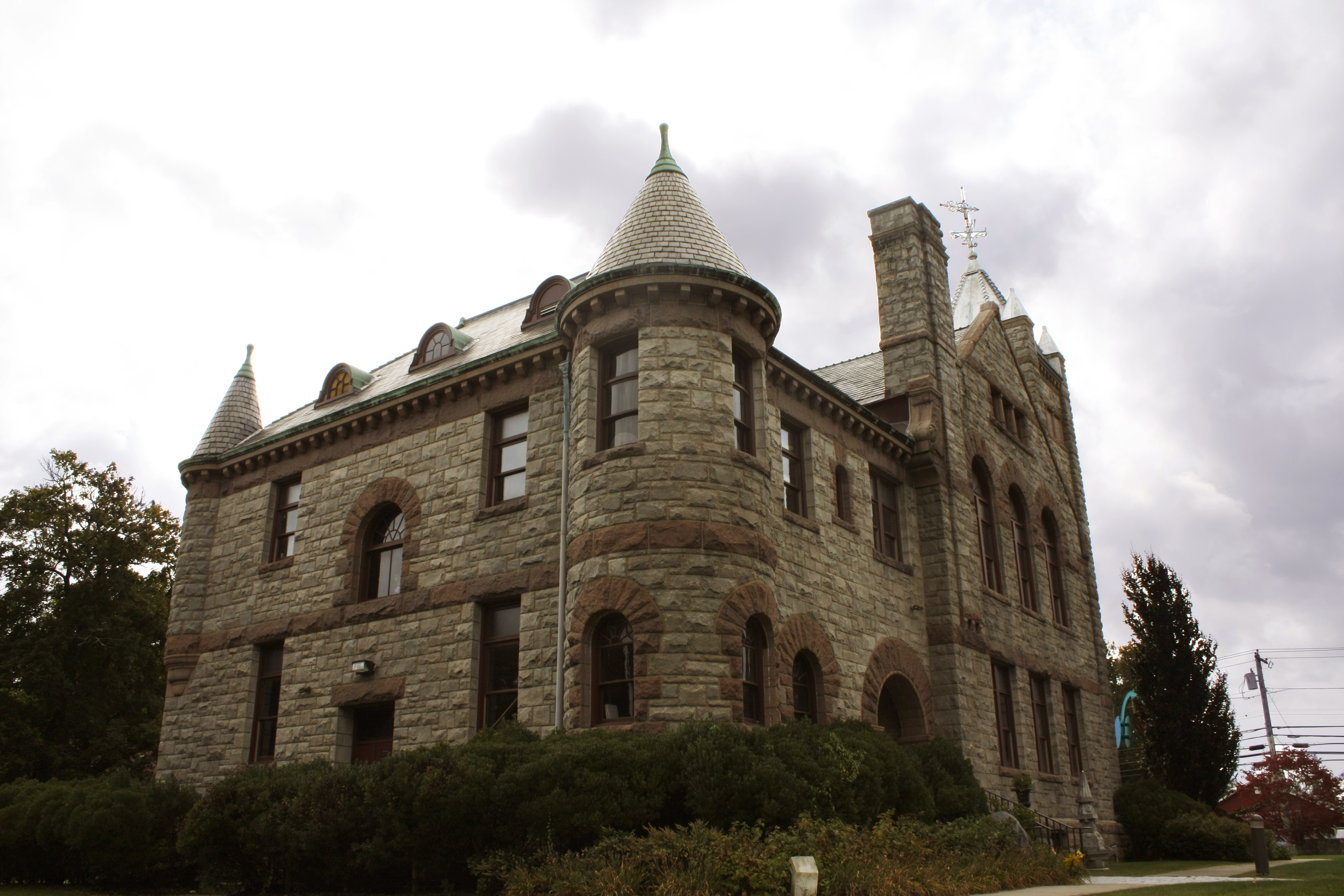

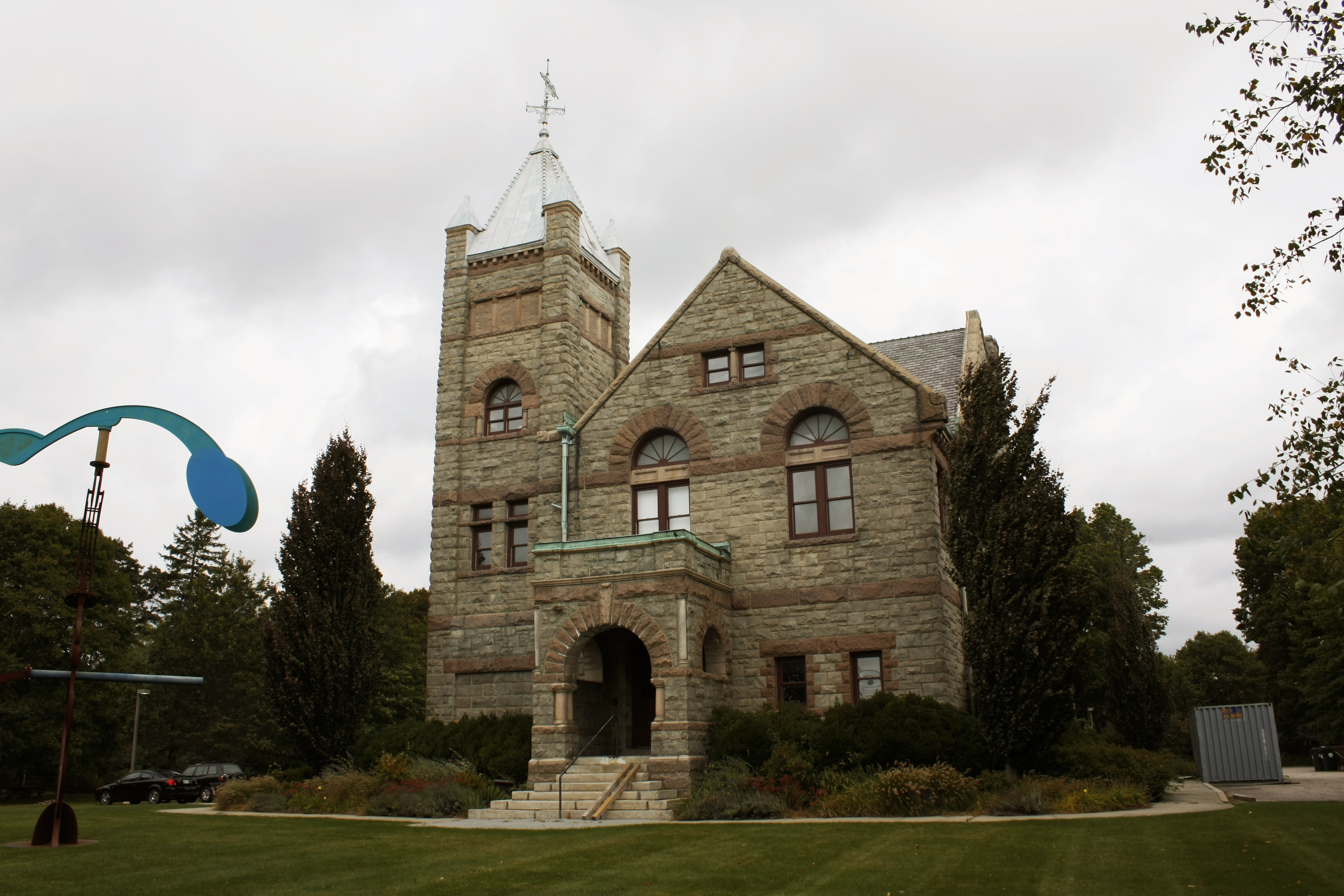

== See also ==
- National Register of Historic Places listings in Washington County, Rhode Island
