= Alexander M. Cruickshank =

American chemist (1919–2017)

- Born: December 13, 1919; Marlborough, New Hampshire, U.S.
- Died: June 10, 2017 (aged 97)
- Education: Rhode Island State College (BS, MS); University of Massachusetts (PhD)
- Occupation: Chemist
- Scientific career
- Fields: Chemistry

Alexander M. Cruickshank (December 13, 1919 – June 10, 2017) was an American chemist and long-serving director of the Gordon Research Conferences.

== Biography ==
Alexander M. Cruickshank was born in Marlborough, New Hampshire. He joined Eta Chapter of Theta Chi Fraternity and completed his B.S. in chemistry at Rhode Island State College in 1943. While working at Rhode Island State College as an instructor he earned his M.S. in chemistry in 1945. He earned his Ph.D. in chemistry from the University of Massachusetts in 1954. Cruickshank served on the chemistry faculty at the University of Rhode Island from 1953 to 1982 and was chair of the chemistry department from 1976 until his 1982 retirement. He also served as director of the Gordon Research Conferences from 1968 until his retirement in 1993. Cruickshank lived in South Kingstown, Rhode Island until his death.

== Legacy ==
Since 1994, the Alexander M. Cruickshank Lectureship Award has been bestowed annually to the most highly distinguished scientists presenting their research at the Gordon Research Conferences. Typically, there is one such lectureship annually for each of the principal subdisciplines of the Conferences, namely the Biological, Chemical, and Physical Sciences. At its discretion, the Gordon Research Conferences Board of Directors may occasionally elect additional Alexander M. Cruickshank lecturers.
