= Kingston, Rhode Island =

Census-designated place in Rhode Island, United States

- Census-designated place
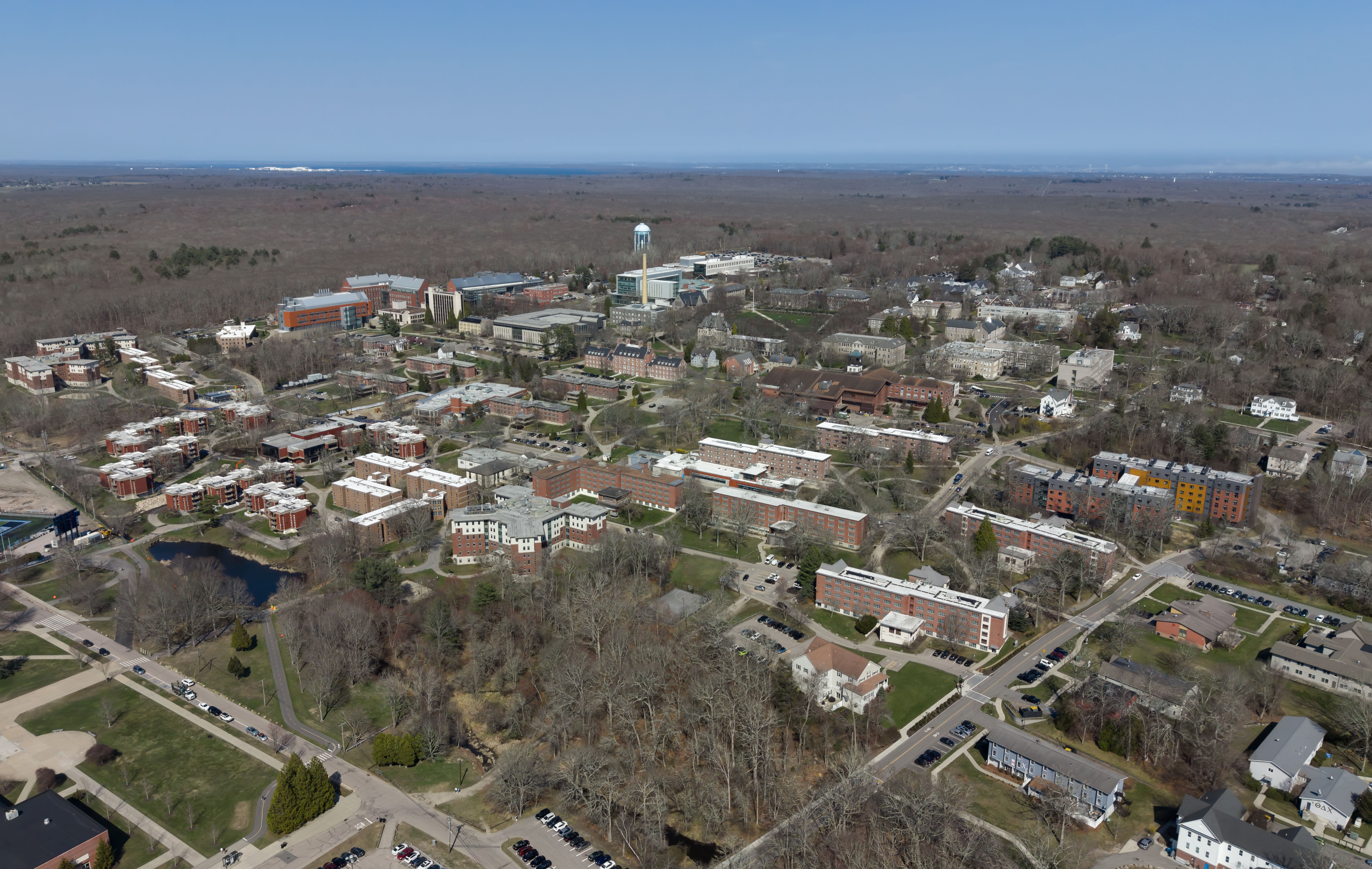
- Aerial view of University of Rhode Island

- Location in the state of Rhode Island Kingston, Rhode Island (the United States)
- Coordinates: 41°29′N 71°32′W
- Country: United States
- State: Rhode Island
- County: Washington

Area
  - Total: 1.56 sq mi (4.05 km^{2})
  - Land: 1.56 sq mi (4.03 km^{2})
  - Water: 0.0077 sq mi (0.02 km^{2})
- Elevation: 246 ft (75 m)

Population (2020)
  - Total: 7,825
  - Density: 5,027.3/sq mi (1,941.05/km^{2})
- Time zone: UTC-5 (Eastern (EST))
  - Summer (DST): UTC-4 (EDT)
- ZIP code: 02881
- Area code: 401
- FIPS code: 44-38980
- GNIS feature ID: 1217812

- Kingston Village Historic District
- U.S. National Register of Historic Places
- U.S. Historic district
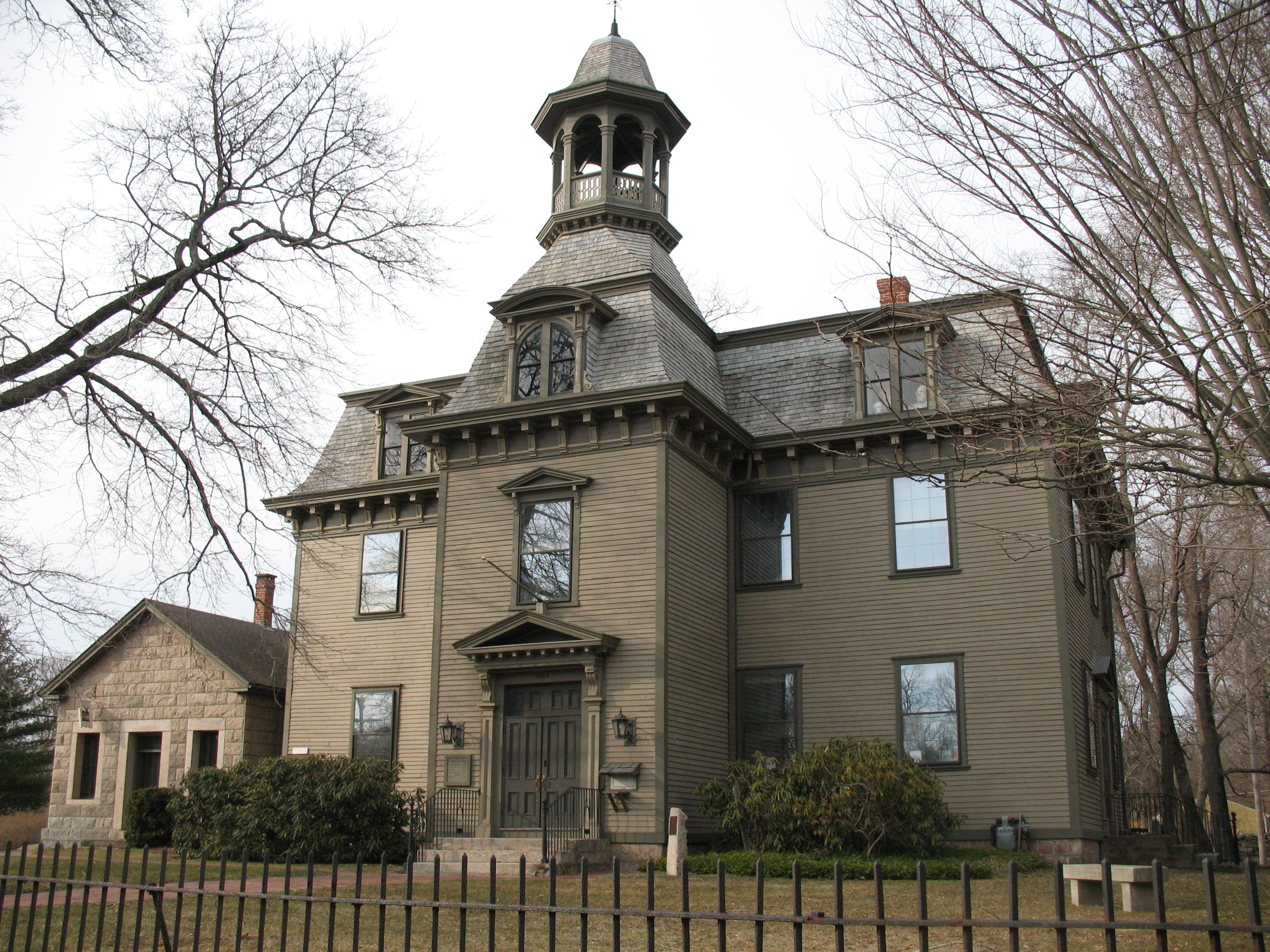
- Kings County Court House (now a public library) where the Constitution was last voted against by Rhode Island in 1790
- Area: 470 acres (190 ha)
- Architectural style: Greek Revival, Late Victorian, Federal, Colonial
- NRHP reference No.: 74000011
- Added to NRHP: May 1, 1974

Kingston in 1900 on Kingstown Road near the intersection of South Road, showing the village well

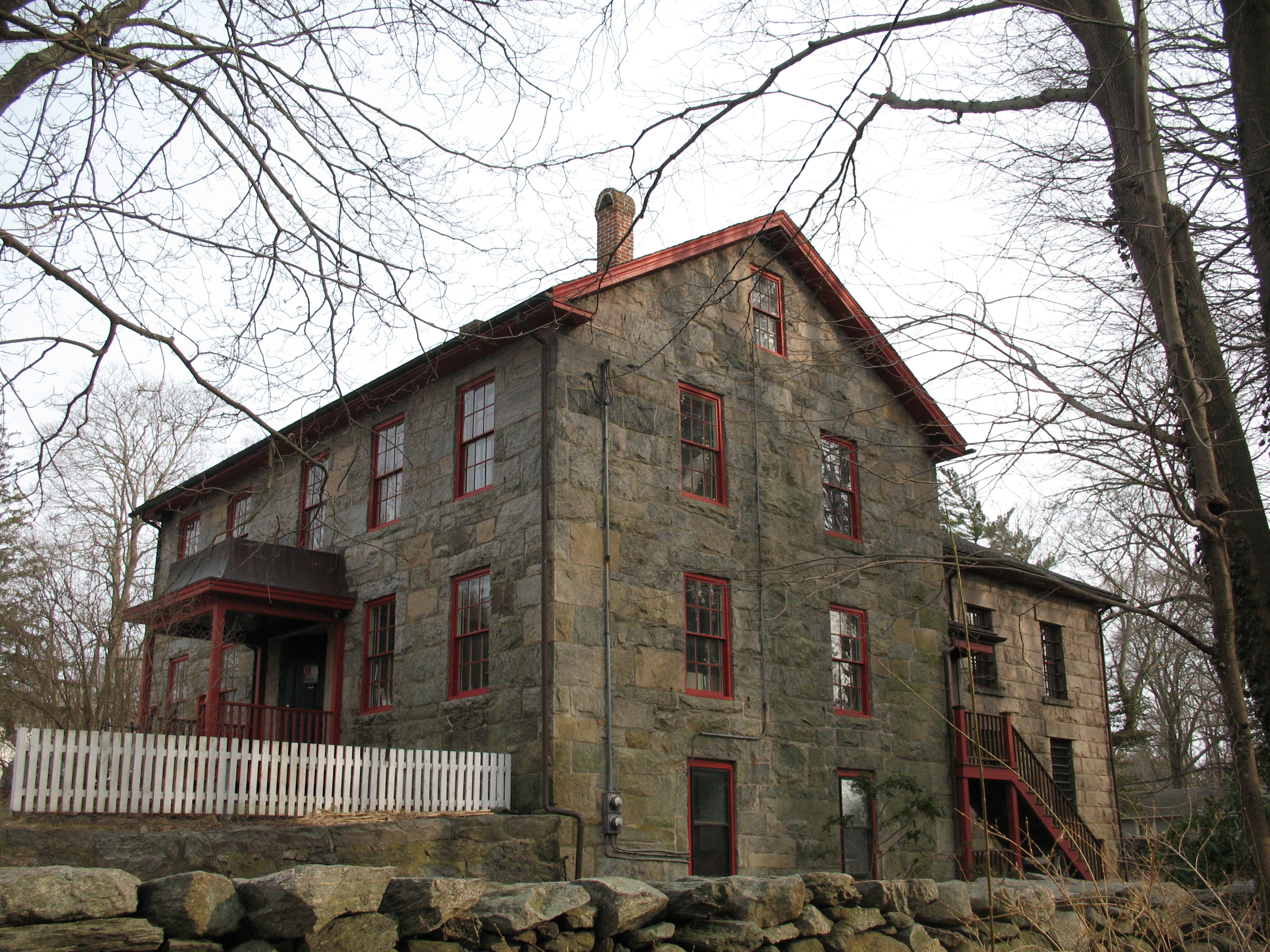
Washington County Jail (1858 & 1861). This building housed prisoners awaiting trial in the county courthouse. It is the current home of the South County History Center.

Kingston is a village and a census-designated place within the town of South Kingstown, Rhode Island, United States, and the site of the main campus of the University of Rhode Island. The population was 7,825 at the 2020 census. Much of the village center is listed on the National Register of Historic Places as Kingston Village Historic District. It was originally known as Little Rest.

== History ==
Kingston was first settled in the late seventeenth century. Originally known as Little Rest, the name was changed to Kingston in 1826. It was the county seat for Washington County (formerly Kings County) from 1752 until 1894, when a new courthouse was built in nearby West Kingston. West Kingston is also the site of the historic Kingston Railroad Station which opened in June 1875. The station is served by Amtrak on its Northeast Corridor.

For a time, starting in the late 1780s, the preacher Jemima Wilkinson, known as the Public Universal Friend resided and gave sermons in the town. As late as the 1900s inhabitants of Kingston called a species of solidago "Jemima weed", because its appearance in the town coincided with the preacher's first visit to the area.

South Kingstown established the Kingston Historic District in 1959, and much of Kingston village became a National Register historic district in 1974 as Kingston Village Historic District. The historic district is located just outside the campus of the University of Rhode Island and contains many fine examples of 18th and 19th century architecture. The historic district includes 38 buildings, including the Elisha Reynolds House.

The University of Rhode Island was established at Kingston in 1888 as the Rhode Island Agricultural School and Agricultural Experiment Station, by funding from the Hatch Act of 1887. In 1892 the Agricultural School became the Rhode Island College of Agriculture and Mechanic Arts with funding from the Second Morrill Land Grant Act of 1890, later becoming Rhode Island State College in 1909 and the University of Rhode Island in 1951.

== Economy ==
In addition to the university, major businesses in Kingston include APC by Schneider Electric and the Arnold Lumber Company.

== Education ==
Public schools are operated by the South Kingstown School District. Educational institutions in Kingston include:

- The Compass School, a public K-8 charter school
- Kingston Hill Academy, a public K-5 charter school
- University of Rhode Island
- Gordon Research Conferences center

== Houses of worship ==
Religious denominations represented with churches, mosques, and synagogues in Kingston or on the university campus are Roman Catholicism, the United Church of Christ, Episcopalians, United Methodists, Baptists, Islam, and Judaism.

== Geography ==
According to the United States Census Bureau, the CDP has a total area of 1.563 square miles (4.05 km^{2}), of which 1.556 square miles (4.03 km^{2}) is land and 0.007 square miles (0.02 km^{2}) (0.45%) is water.

=== Climate ===
Climate data for Kingston, Rhode Island (1991–2020 normals, extremes 1893–present)
Month	Jan	Feb	Mar	Apr	May	Jun	Jul	Aug	Sep	Oct	Nov	Dec	Year
Record high °F (°C)	69 (21)	73 (23)	82 (28)	92 (33)	97 (36)	96 (36)	100 (38)	100 (38)	95 (35)	87 (31)	80 (27)	73 (23)	100 (38)
Mean maximum °F (°C)	57.9 (14.4)	57.4 (14.1)	65.8 (18.8)	75.7 (24.3)	85.9 (29.9)	89.6 (32.0)	92.5 (33.6)	90.6 (32.6)	86.1 (30.1)	78.3 (25.7)	69.1 (20.6)	60.9 (16.1)	94.1 (34.5)
Mean daily maximum °F (°C)	40.2 (4.6)	42.5 (5.8)	49.1 (9.5)	59.7 (15.4)	69.7 (20.9)	78.0 (25.6)	83.3 (28.5)	82.4 (28.0)	75.8 (24.3)	65.2 (18.4)	54.5 (12.5)	45.2 (7.3)	62.1 (16.7)
Daily mean °F (°C)	30.5 (−0.8)	32.2 (0.1)	38.7 (3.7)	48.4 (9.1)	58.2 (14.6)	66.9 (19.4)	72.6 (22.6)	71.4 (21.9)	64.6 (18.1)	53.8 (12.1)	44.1 (6.7)	35.8 (2.1)	51.4 (10.8)
Mean daily minimum °F (°C)	20.8 (−6.2)	22.0 (−5.6)	28.3 (−2.1)	37.1 (2.8)	46.6 (8.1)	55.9 (13.3)	61.8 (16.6)	60.3 (15.7)	53.4 (11.9)	42.4 (5.8)	33.8 (1.0)	26.3 (−3.2)	40.7 (4.8)
Mean minimum °F (°C)	−0.5 (−18.1)	2.4 (−16.4)	10.5 (−11.9)	23.1 (−4.9)	31.2 (−0.4)	41.1 (5.1)	48.8 (9.3)	46.2 (7.9)	35.5 (1.9)	24.4 (−4.2)	15.9 (−8.9)	7.6 (−13.6)	−3.7 (−19.8)
Record low °F (°C)	−23 (−31)	−22 (−30)	−10 (−23)	8 (−13)	25 (−4)	30 (−1)	38 (3)	33 (1)	25 (−4)	13 (−11)	−4 (−20)	−17 (−27)	−23 (−31)
Average precipitation inches (mm)	4.24 (108)	3.77 (96)	5.59 (142)	4.90 (124)	3.81 (97)	4.11 (104)	3.30 (84)	4.26 (108)	4.36 (111)	4.98 (126)	4.49 (114)	5.33 (135)	53.14 (1,350)
Average snowfall inches (cm)	10.0 (25)	9.9 (25)	6.2 (16)	1.1 (2.8)	0.0 (0.0)	0.0 (0.0)	0.0 (0.0)	0.0 (0.0)	0.0 (0.0)	0.1 (0.25)	0.6 (1.5)	6.6 (17)	34.5 (88)
Average extreme snow depth inches (cm)	5.9 (15)	6.2 (16)	3.7 (9.4)	0.6 (1.5)	0.0 (0.0)	0.0 (0.0)	0.0 (0.0)	0.0 (0.0)	0.0 (0.0)	0.0 (0.0)	0.3 (0.76)	4.0 (10)	9.7 (25)
Average precipitation days (≥ 0.01 in)	10.7	9.3	10.0	11.8	12.8	11.2	9.5	9.9	9.3	11.7	10.3	11.2	127.7
Average snowy days (≥ 0.1 in)	4.5	4.1	2.7	0.3	0.0	0.0	0.0	0.0	0.0	0.1	0.3	2.7	14.7
Source: NOAA

== Demographics ==
Historical population
Census	Pop.	Note	%±
2020	7,825		—
U.S. Decennial Census

=== 2020 census ===
The 2020 United States census counted 7,825 people, 717 households, and 426 families in Kingston. The population density was 5,025.7 per square mile (1,940.4/km^{2}). There were 782 housing units at an average density of 502.2 per square mile (193.9/km^{2}). The racial makeup was 79.32% (6,207) white or European American (78.82% non-Hispanic white), 5.0% (391) black or African-American, 0.23% (18) Native American or Alaska Native, 4.74% (371) Asian, 0.05% (4) Pacific Islander or Native Hawaiian, 7.87% (616) from other races, and 2.79% (218) from two or more races. Hispanic or Latino of any race was 8.73% (683) of the population.

Of the 717 households, 25.9% had children under the age of 18; 55.0% were married couples living together; 22.6% had a female householder with no spouse or partner present. 25.4% of households consisted of individuals and 8.1% had someone living alone who was 65 years of age or older. The average household size was 2.9 and the average family size was 3.2. The percent of those with a bachelor's degree or higher was estimated to be 9.6% of the population.

4.5% of the population was under the age of 18, 80.2% from 18 to 24, 5.3% from 25 to 44, 5.4% from 45 to 64, and 4.6% who were 65 years of age or older. The median age was 19.9 years. For every 100 females, the population had 138.3 males. For every 100 females ages 18 and older, there were 139.4 males.

The 2016–2020 5-year American Community Survey estimates show that the median household income was $112,344 (with a margin of error of +/- $17,256) and the median family income was $111,563 (+/- $17,329). Males had a median income of $4,619 (+/- $1,098) versus $4,193 (+/- $496) for females. The median income for those above 16 years old was $4,344 (+/- $533). Approximately, 0.0% of families and 3.2% of the population were below the poverty line, including 0.0% of those under the age of 18 and 2.5% of those ages 65 or over.

== Nearby populated areas ==
- Wakefield (3 miles)
- Peace Dale (3 miles)
- Narragansett (5 miles)

== See also ==
- George Fayerweather Blacksmith Shop
- Great Swamp Fight
- Kingston (Amtrak station)
- South County History Center
- Tavern Hall Preservation Society/Elisha Reynolds House (1738)
- Tootell House
- Washington County Courthouse
- National Register of Historic Places listings in Washington County, Rhode Island
