= List of people from Rhode Island =

State flag of Rhode Island

Location of Rhode Island in the United States

This is a list of prominent people who were born in the state of Rhode Island or who spent significant periods of their lives in the state.

== Academia ==
Elizabeth Buffum Chace

- James Burrill Angell (1829–1916) – educator, academic administrator, and diplomat
- Glen Bowersock (born 1936) – scholar of the ancient world and the history of ancient Greece, Rome, and the Near East
- Robert Carothers (born 1942) – president of the University of Rhode Island
- Ronald Champagne (born 1942) – president of Elmira College, Merrimack College, and Shimer College
- Sarah Doyle (1830–1922) – educator and reformer
- Paula Fredriksen (born 1951) – historian and scholar of religious studies
- Henry Giroux (born 1943) – radical educator and cultural critic
- Neil Lanctot (born 1966) – historian
- Francis Leo Lawrence (1937–2013) – educator, scholar of French literature, and university administrator
- Edward T. Lewis (also known as Ted Lewis) (born 1936) – president of St. Mary's College of Maryland, president of the Pennsylvania Academy of Fine Arts, writer, and poet
- Helen Adelia Rowe Metcalf (1830–1895) – founder and director of the Rhode Island School of Design
- Barry Mills (born 1950) – fourteenth president of Bowdoin College
- Salvatore D. Morgera (born 1946) – Professor of Electrical Engineering at University of South Florida
- Wilfred Harold Munro (1849–1934) – historian
- Richard Vangermeersch (born 1940) – economist, Emeritus Professor of Accounting at the University of Rhode Island
- Minton Warren (1850–1907) – classical scholar

== Activism, civil rights, and philanthropy ==
- Susan Hammond Barney (1834–1922) – social activist
- Josephine Byrd – civil rights activist in Woonsocket, RI
- Zechariah Chafee (1885–1957) – judicial philosopher, civil rights advocate
- Elizabeth Buffum Chace (1806–1899) – activist in the anti-slavery, women's-rights, and prison-reform movements of the mid-to-late 19th century
- Ann Keefe (1952–2015) – social activist and nun
- Richard Holcomb (born 1976) – human rights advocate, street outreach worker, HIV prevention counselor, and co-founder of Project Weber/Renew
- Cornelia Bryce Pinchot (1881–1960) – Newport native who became a conservationist, Progressive politician, women's rights activist, and First Lady of Pennsylvania
- Mary Reilly (born 1930) – teacher, leader, advocate for girls and women living in poverty
- Abby Aldrich Rockefeller (1874–1948) – philanthropist
- Marvin Ronning (1961–2022) – education and environmental advocate; senior administrator at the Rhode Island Free Clinic
- Juanita Sánchez (died 1992) – social worker and social activist
- Robert Ellis Smith (1940–2018) – publisher and consumer activist, Privacy Journal; civil rights journalist in Alabama
- Dorcas James Spencer (1841–1933) – social activist and writer
- Marjorie van Vliet (1923–1990) – teacher and aviator
- Rye Barcott (born 1978)- social entrepreneur and CEO of With Honor

== Art, literature, and design ==
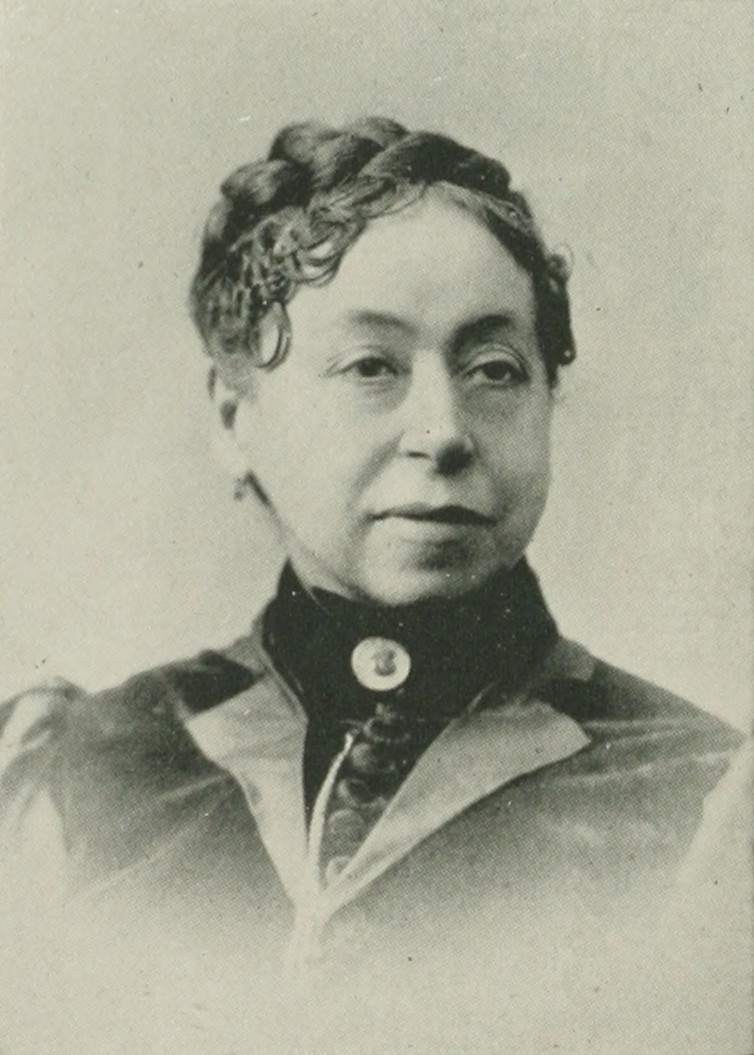
Mary H. Gray Clarke

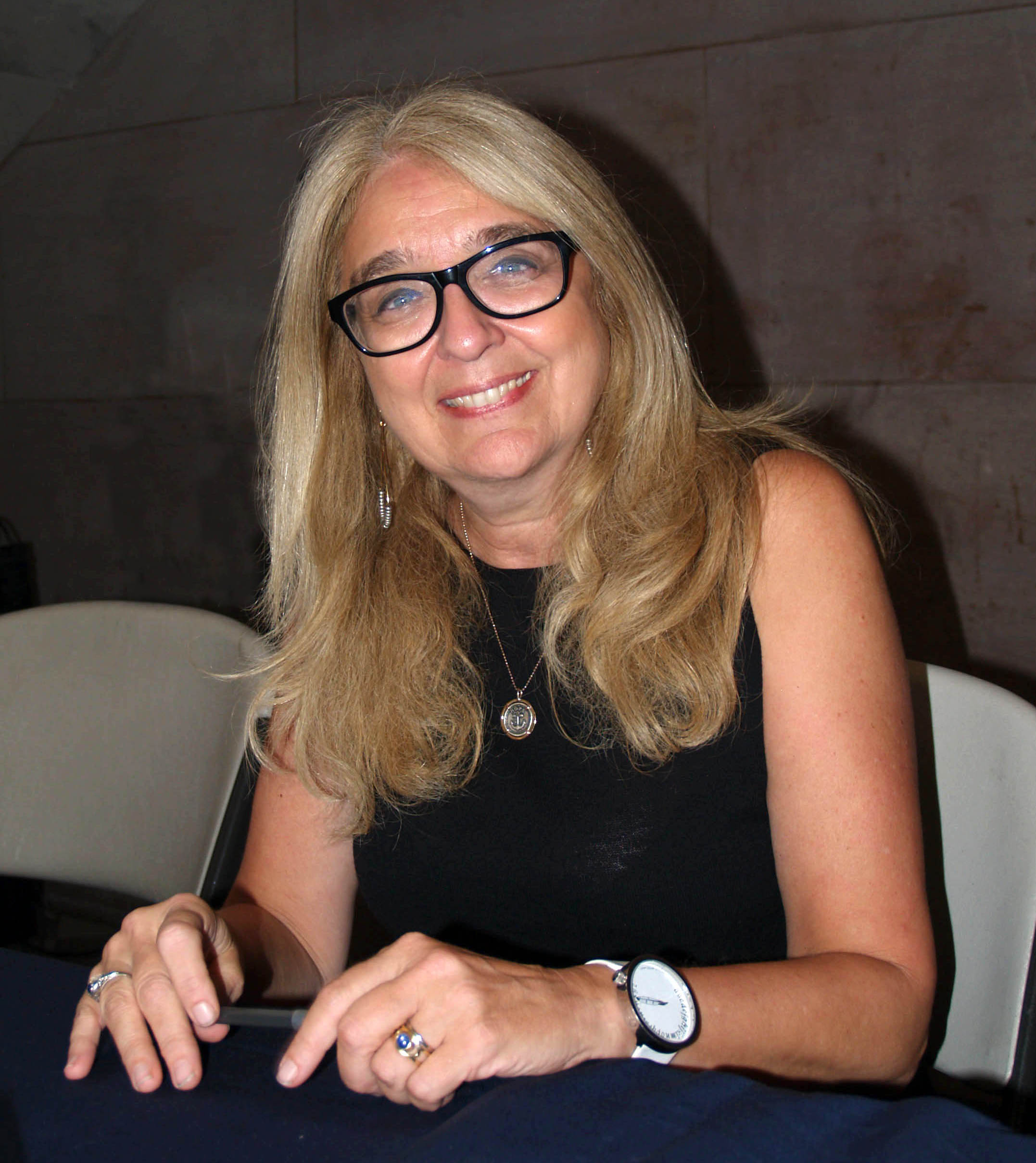
Ann Hood

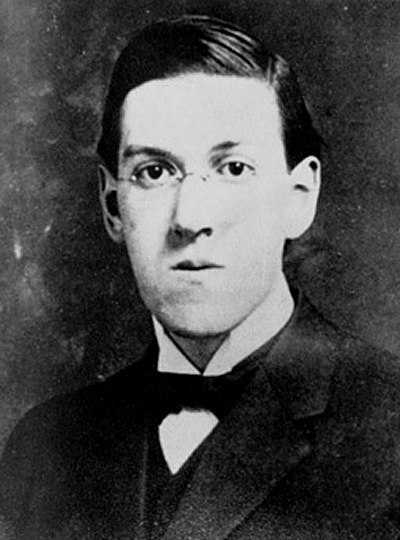
H. P. Lovecraft

- Jacob M. Appel (born 1973) – novelist
- John Noble Barlow (1861–1917) – painter
- Lee Bontecou (1931–2022) – sculptor and printmaker
- Mary H. Gray Clarke (1835–1892) – author, correspondent, and poet
- George M. Cohan (1878–1942) – playwright, composer, and vaudeville performer
- Paul Di Filippo (born 1954) – science fiction author and critic
- Denise Duhamel (born 1961) – poet
- Judith Dupré – author
- C. M. Eddy Jr. (1896–1967) – author
- Jeanpaul Ferro (born 1967) – poet, short fiction author, novelist
- F. Burge Griswold (1826–1900) – author
- John Hawkes (1925–1998) – novelist
- Greta Hodgkinson (born 1973) – ballet dancer
- Ann Hood (born 1956) – novelist and short story writer
- Raymond Mathewson Hood (1881–1934) – architect
- Galway Kinnell (1927–2014) – poet
- Eleanor Kirk (1831–1908) – author, publisher
- Christopher La Farge (1897–1956) – novelist and poet
- Jhumpa Lahiri (born 1967) – Pulitzer Prize-author
- H. P. Lovecraft (1890–1937) – author
- Maxwell Mays (1918–2009) – painter
- David Macaulay (born 1946) – author
- Cormac McCarthy (1933–2023) – novelist
- Don McGregor (born 1945) – comic book writer
- Edwin O'Connor (1918–1968) – novelist
- S.J. Perelman (1904–1979) – humorist, critic
- Peter Pezzelli (born 1959) – author
- David Plante (born 1940) – novelist
- George Schuyler (1895–1977) – author
- Bert Shurtleff (1897–1967) – author
- Gilbert Stuart (1755–1828) – painter
- Philemon Sturges (1929–2005) – architect and children's author
- Cynthia Taggart (1801–1849) – poet
- Thomas Alexander Tefft (1826–1859) – architect
- Chrysanthemum Tran – poet
- Trav S.D. (born 1965) – author, playwright, arts journalist
- Don Winslow (born 1953) – author

== Athletics ==
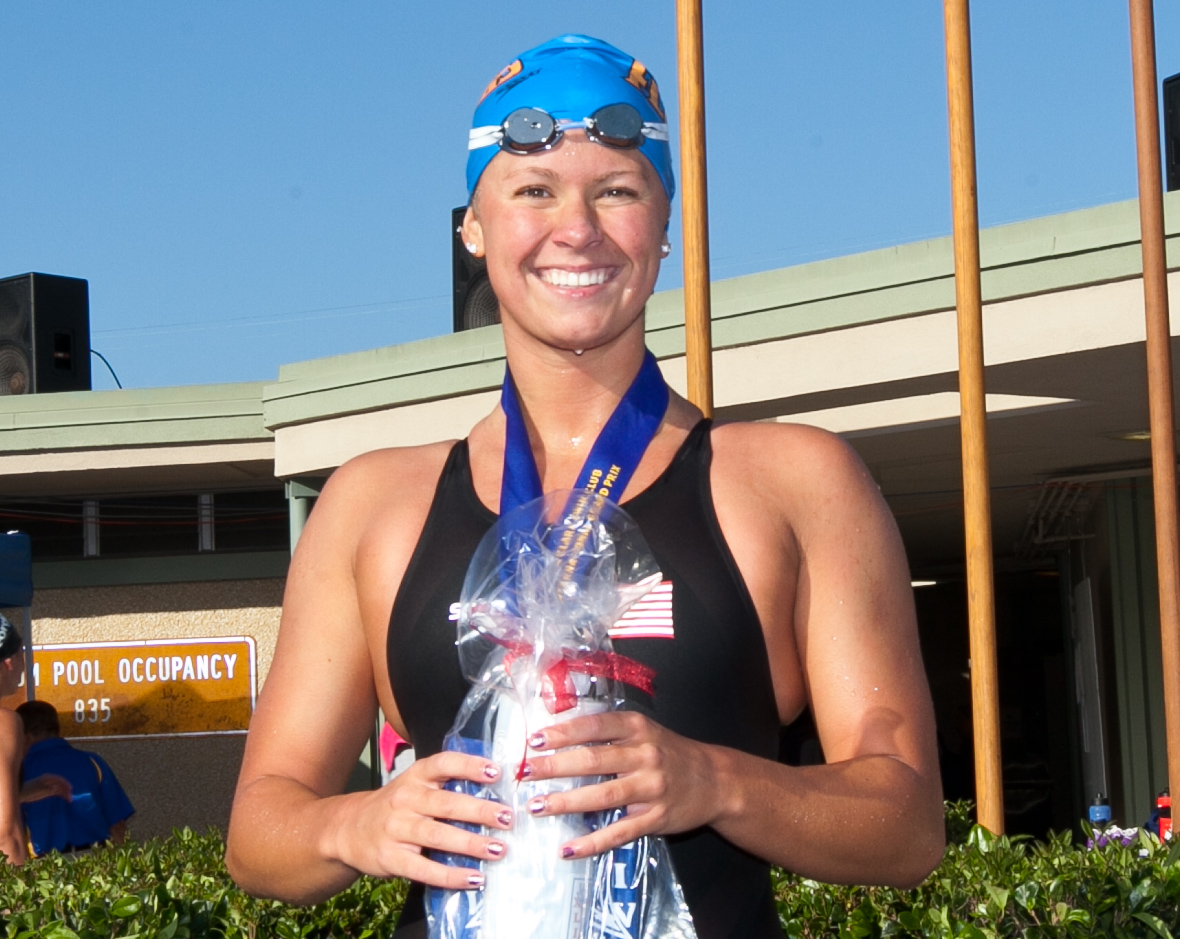
Elizabeth Beisel

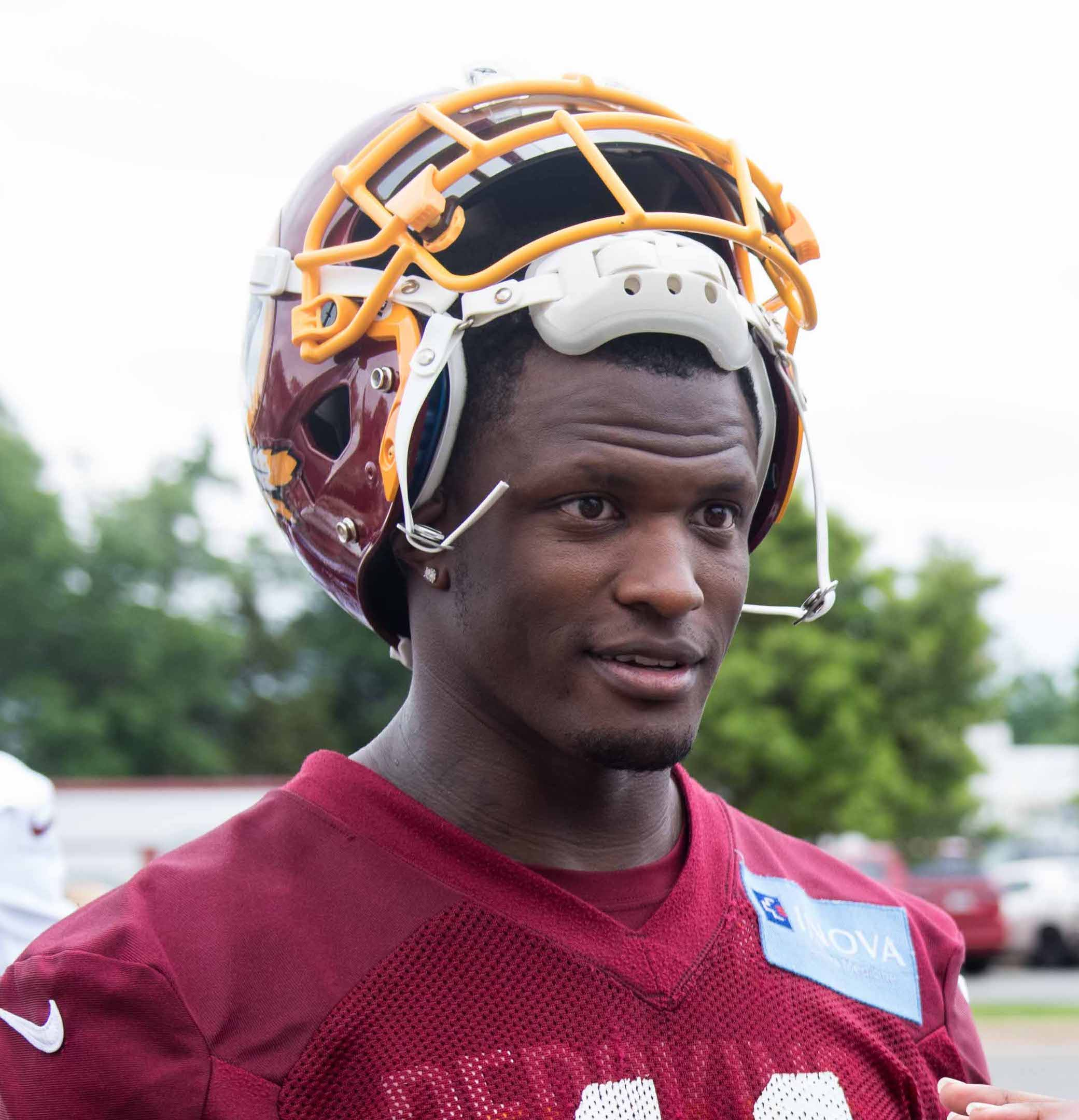
Will Blackmon

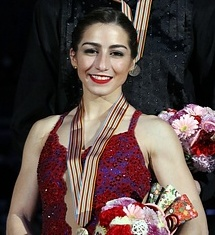
Marissa Castelli

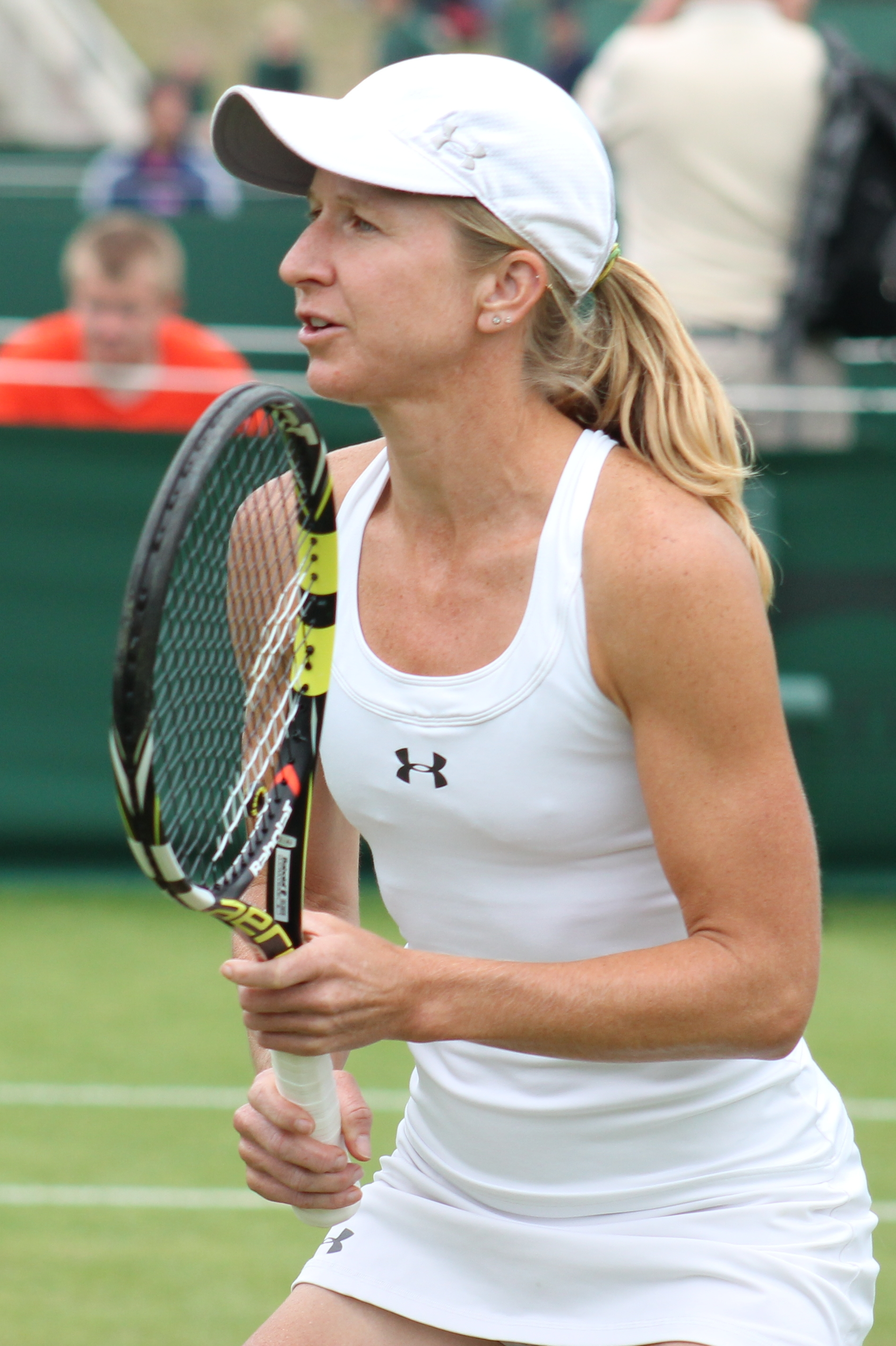
Jill Craybas

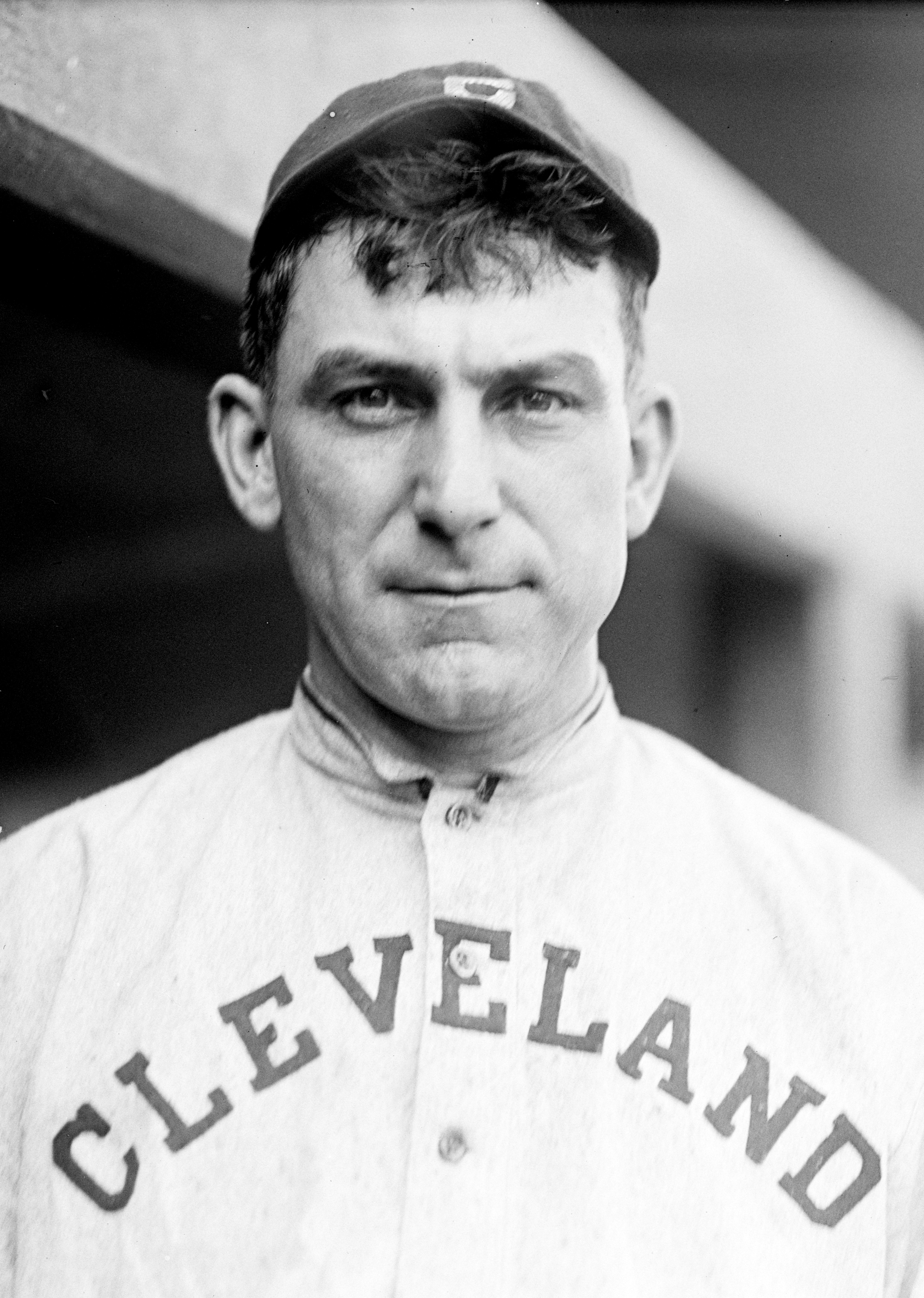
Nap Lajoie

A–G

- Lou Abbruzzi (1917–1982) – football player
- Pat Abbruzzi (1932–1998) – football player
- Noel Acciari (born 1991) – ice hockey player
- Gary Albright (1963–2000) – wrestler
- Bill Almon (born 1952) – baseball player
- Deon Anderson (born 1983) – football player
- Billy Andrade (born 1964) – golfer
- Demetrius Andrade (born 1988) – boxer
- Earl Audet (1921–2002) – football player
- Rocco Baldelli (born 1981) – baseball player, manager
- Marvin Barnes (1952–2014) – basketball player
- Elizabeth Beisel (born 1992) – Olympic swimmer (2008, 2012)
- Jeff Beliveau (born 1987) – baseball player
- Curt Bennett (born 1948) – ice hockey player
- Harvey Bennett (born 1952) – ice hockey player
- John Bennett (born 1950) – ice hockey player
- Bryan Berard (born 1977) – ice hockey player
- Will Blackmon (born 1984) – football player
- Brian Boucher (born 1977) – ice hockey player
- Paul Briggs (1920–2011) – football player
- Ellison "Tarzan" Brown (1913–1975) – two-time Boston Marathon champion and U.S. Olympian
- Brian Burke (born 1955) – ice hockey executive
- Ernie Calverley (1924–2003) – basketball player
- Dave Capuano (born 1968) – ice hockey player
- Jack Capuano (born 1966) – ice hockey player, head coach
- Keith Carney (born 1970) – ice hockey player and U.S. Olympian (1998)
- Marissa Castelli (born 1990) – Olympic pairs figure skater (2014)
- Tom Cavanagh (1982–2011) – hockey player
- Malcolm Chance (1875–1955) – Hall of Fame tennis player
- Mike Cloud (born 1975) – football player
- Fred Corey (1855–1912) – baseball player
- Miguel Cotto (born 1980) – boxer
- Jill Craybas (born 1974) – tennis player
- Sara DeCosta (born 1977) – Olympic ice hockey champion and silver medalist (1998, 2002)
- Al Del Greco (born 1962) – football player, radio personality
- Ernie DiGregorio (born 1951) – basketball player
- Clark Donatelli (born 1967) – ice hockey player and U.S. Olympian (1988, 1992)
- Allen Doyle (born 1948) – golfer
- Pat Duff (1875–1925) – baseball player
- David Duke Jr. (born 1999) – basketball player
- Anthony Durante (1967–2003) – professional wrestler
- Joe Exter (born 1978) – ice hockey player
- Brad Faxon (born 1961) – golfer
- Claire Waters Ferguson (1936–2024) – ice skating executive
- Melissa Fiorentino (born 1977) – boxer
- Steve Furness (1950–2000) – football player, coach
- Tom Garrick (born 1966) – basketball player
- Rob Gaudreau (born 1970) – ice hockey player
- Dave Gavitt (1937–2011) – basketball coach
- Billy Gonsalves (1908–1977) – soccer player
- Lou Gorman (1929–2011) – baseball executive
- Paul Guay (born 1963) – ice hockey player

H–Z

- Gabby Hartnett (1900–1972) – baseball player
- Joe Hassett (born 1955) – basketball player
- Tom Healey (1853–1891) – baseball player
- Anne Hird (born 1959) – pioneering marathon runner
- P. H. Horgan III (born 1960) – golfer
- Tony Horton (born 1958) – physical fitness expert
- Robert Howard (1975–2004) – 1996 and 2000 U.S. Olympic Track & Field Team
- John Hynes (born 1975) – ice hockey head coach
- Matt Hyson (born 1970) – wrestler
- Chris Iannetta (born 1983) – baseball player
- Drew Inzer (born 1979) – football player
- Jeff Jillson (born 1980) – ice hockey player
- Steven King (born 1969) – ice hockey player
- Tyler Kolek (born 2001) – basketball player
- Paul Konerko (born 1976) – baseball player
- Clem Labine (1926–2007) – baseball player
- Nap Lajoie (1874–1959) – Hall of Fame baseball player
- Clara LaMore (1926–2021) – International Swimming Hall of Fame inductee
- Lou Lamoriello (born 1942) – ice hockey executive
- Rick Lancellotti (born 1956) – baseball player
- John LaRose (1951–2021) – baseball player
- Brian Lawton (born 1965) – hockey player
- Ricky Ledo (born 1992) – basketball player
- Ed Lee (born 1961) – ice hockey player
- David Littman (born 1967) – ice hockey player
- Davey Lopes (born 1945) – baseball player and coach
- Peter Manfredo (born 1980) – boxer
- Joe Mazzulla (born 1988) – basketball coach
- Ken McDonald (born 1970) – basketball player, coach
- John Mellekas (1933–2015) – football player
- Tom Mellor (born 1950) – hockey player and U.S. Olympian (1972)
- Ray Monaco (1918–2002) – football player
- Chet Nichols Jr. (1931–1995) – baseball player
- Bill Osmanski (1915–1996) – College Football Hall of Fame inductee
- Chuck Palumbo (born 1971) – wrestler
- Don Panciera (1927–2012) – football player
- Michael Parkhurst (born 1984) – soccer player, U.S. Olympian, and Rhode Island FC co-founder
- Les Pawson (1905–1992) – two-time Boston Marathon winner
- Kwity Paye (born 1998) – football player
- Vinny Paz (born 1962) – boxer, five-time world champion
- Gerry Philbin (born 1941) – football player
- David Quinn (born 1966) – ice hockey player
- Joe Reed (born 1948) – football player
- Aileen Riggin (1906–2002) – swimmer
- Bill Sandeman (born 1942) – football player
- Mathieu Schneider (born 1969) – professional ice hockey player
- Bobby Sewall (born 1988) – football player
- Bert Shurtleff (1897–1967) – football player
- Jamie Silva (born 1984) – football player
- Jim Siwy (born 1958) – baseball player
- A. J. Smith (born 1949) – football executive
- Hank Soar (1914–2001) – football player
- Joe Soares – rugby player
- Sean Soriano (born 1989) – mixed martial artist
- Andre Soukhamthath (born 1988) – mixed martial artist
- Mike Stefanik (1958–2019) – NASCAR driver
- Bill Summers (1895–1966) – Major League Baseball umpire
- Cole Swider (born 1999) – basketball player
- Chris Terreri (born 1964) – NHL goalie, two Stanley Cups and U.S. Olympian (1988)
- Mark Van Eeghen (born 1952) – NFL Pro Bowl running back
- Dan Wheeler (born 1977) – baseball player
- Cody Wild (born 1987) – ice hockey player
- Mason Williams (born 1991) – baseball player
- Ron Wilson (born 1955) – ice hockey player, head coach
- Jeff Xavier (born 1985) – basketball player

== Business ==
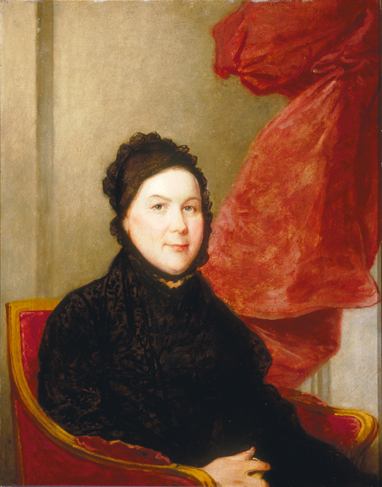
Catharine Littlefield Greene

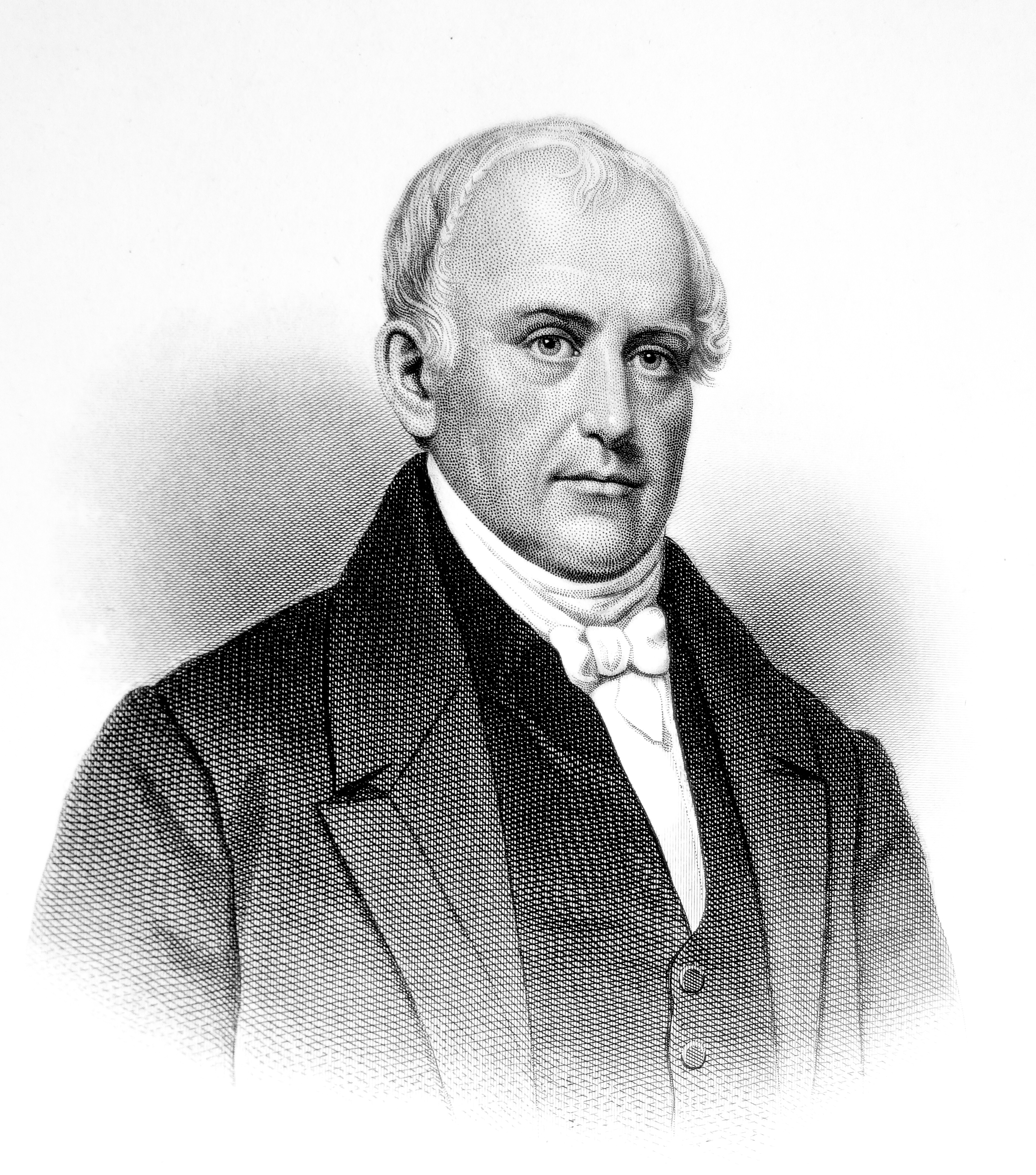
Samuel Slater

- Zachariah Allen (1795–1882) – textile manufacturer, scientist, lawyer, writer, inventor and civil leader
- Everett M. "Busy" Arnold (1899–1974) – comic book publisher
- F. Nelson Blount (1918–1967) – industrialist and railroad enthusiast, founder of the Blount Seafood Corporation and Steamtown, USA
- John Brown (1736–1803) – merchant and slave-trader, original owner of the John Brown House, co-founder of the College in the English Colony of Rhode Island and Providence Plantations (Brown University)
- Moses Brown (1738–1836) – co-founder of the College in the English Colony of Rhode Island and Providence Plantations (Brown University)
- Nicholas Brown Jr. (1769–1841) – businessman and philanthropist for whom Brown University is named
- Robert Crandall (born 1935) – former president and chairman of American Airlines
- Glenn Creamer (born 1962) – senior managing director of Providence Equity Partners
- Marcel Desaulniers (born 1945) – chef and director emeritus of the Culinary Institute of America
- Wylie Dufresne (born 1970) – celebrity chef, owner of wd~50 restaurant in Manhattan
- Ann Smith Franklin (1696–1763) – publisher
- Darius Goff (1809–1891) – Pawtucket textile mill owner
- Catherine Littlefield Greene (1755–1814) – patriot of the American Revolutionary War
- Daniel Harple (born 1959) – entrepreneur, investor, inventor
- Brad Jacobs (born 1956) – chairman and chief executive officer of XPO Logistics
- Laura Lang – former chief executive officer of Time Inc.
- Aaron Lopez (1731–1782) – slave merchant and philanthropist, wealthiest person in Newport
- Edward J. McElroy (born 1941) – labor union executive
- James McNerney (born 1949) – business executive
- David Nason (born 1970) – president and CEO of GE Energy Financial Services
- Jonathan M. Nelson (born 1956) – businessman and investor, founder of Providence Equity Partners
- Carolyn Rafaelian – designer, philanthropist, and business woman, founder of Alex and Ani
- Samuel Slater (1768–1835) – industrialist, "father of the industrial revolution"
- Henry J. Steere (1830–1889) – textile industrialist, philanthropist
- Judah Touro (1775–1854) – businessman
- William Kissam Vanderbilt (1849–1920) – member of the prominent American Vanderbilt family, original owner of Marble House in Newport
- William Vernon (1719–1806) – trader

== Crime ==
- Thomas Tew (1649–1695) – pirate

== Film and television ==
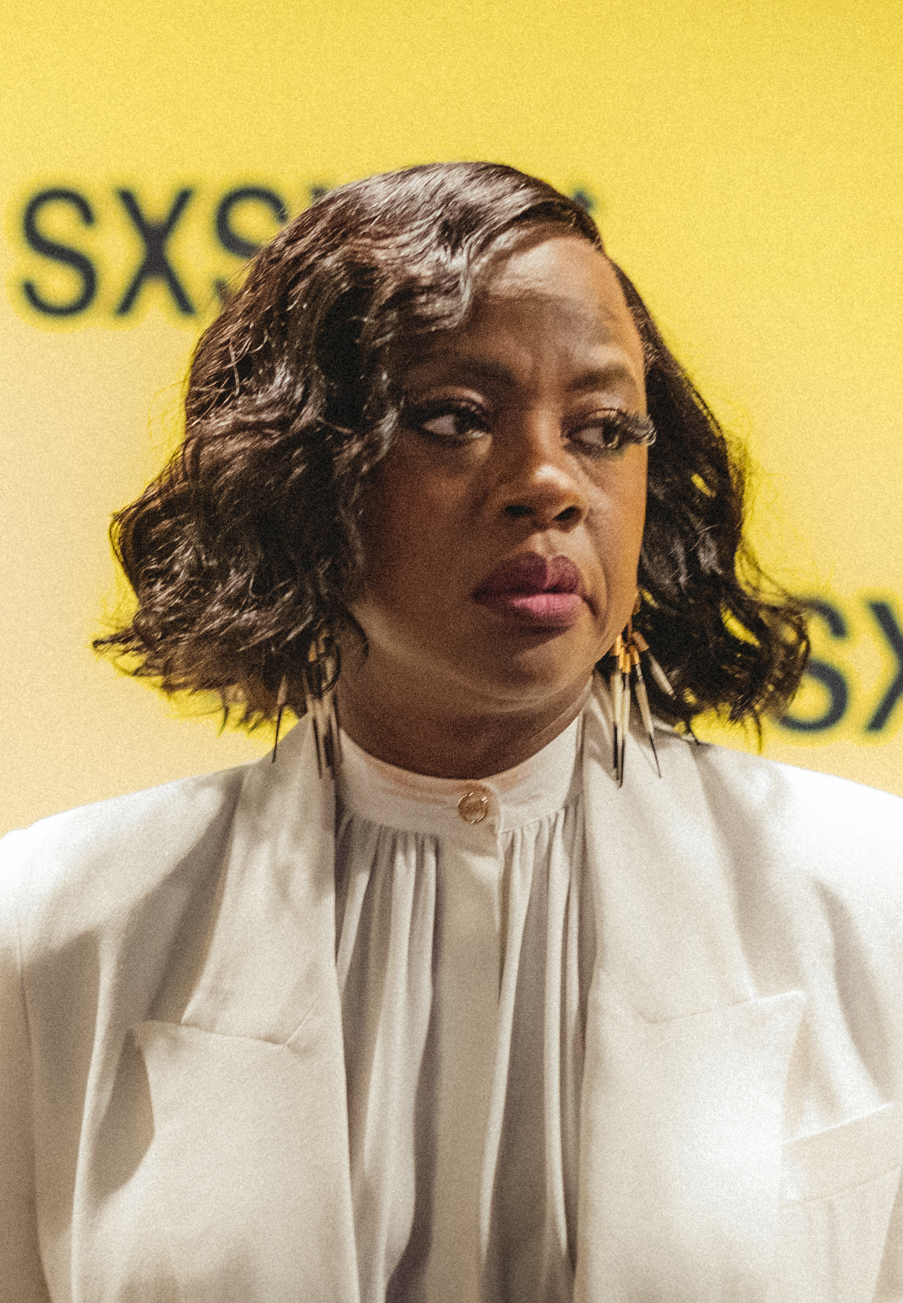
Viola Davis

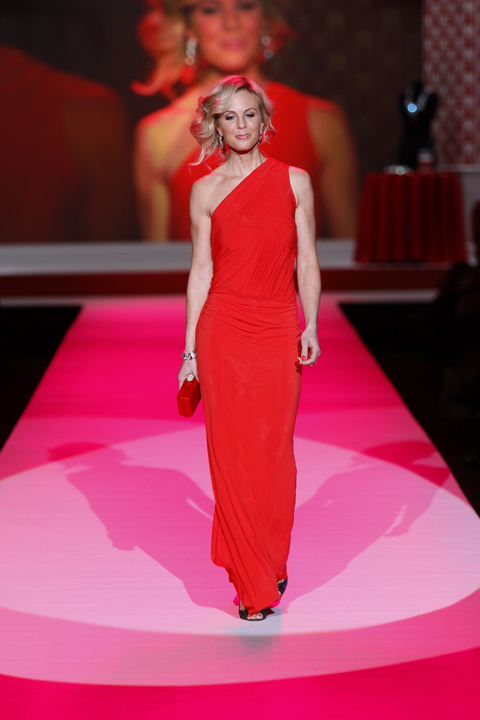
Elisabeth Hasselbeck

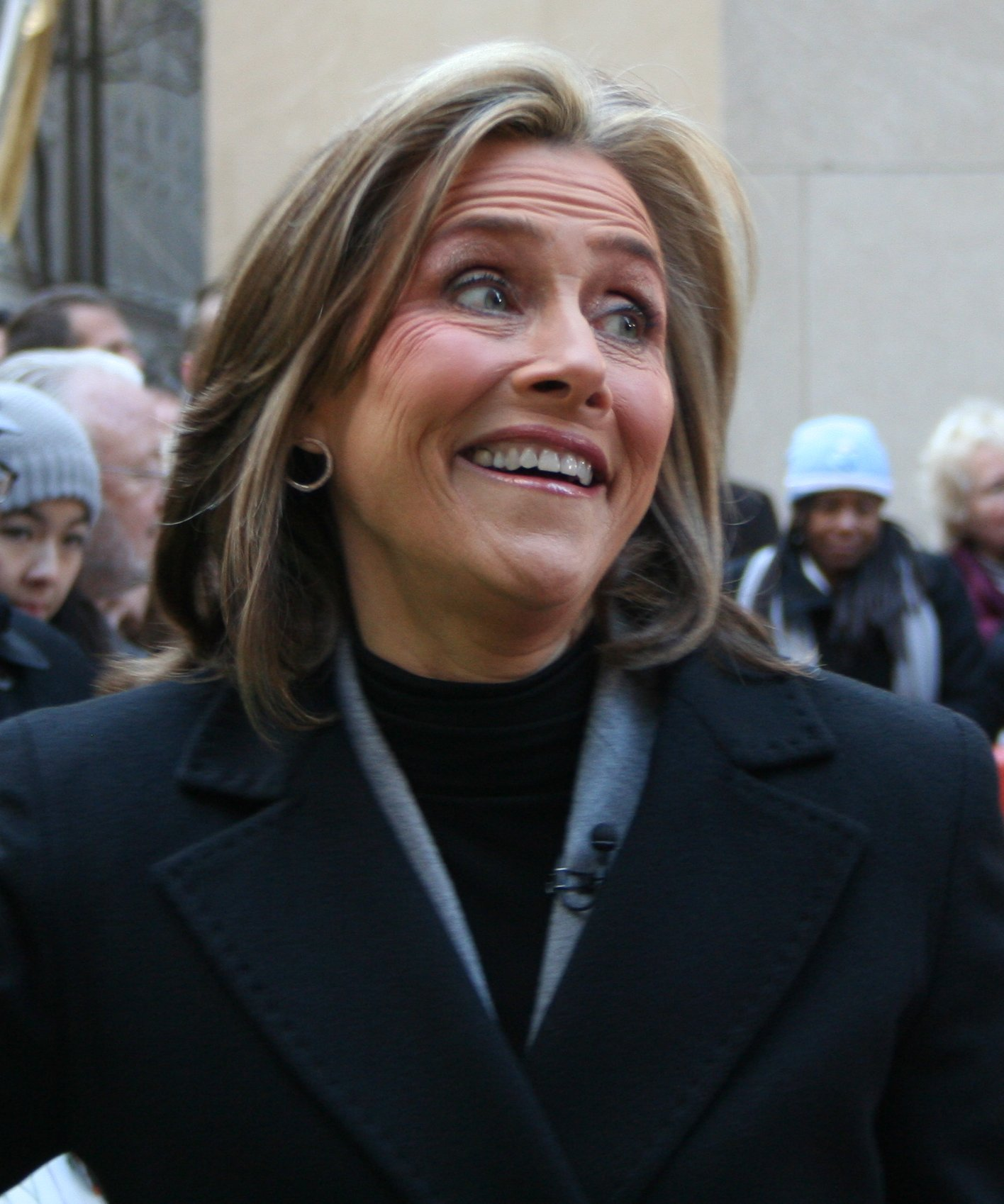
Meredith Vieira

A–L

- Norm Abram (born 1950) – carpenter and television performer
- Robert Aldrich (1918–1983) – film director
- Gianna Amore (born 1968) – model and actress
- Harry Anderson (1952–2018) – actor, Night Court
- David Angell (1946–2001) – television producer
- Nadia Bjorlin (born 1980) – actress
- Billy Bush (born 1971) – radio and TV host, Access Hollywood, Today
- Ruth Buzzi (1936–2025) – comedian, Laugh-In
- Sean Callery (born 1964) – film and television composer
- Robert Capron (born 1998) – actor
- Marilyn Chambers (1952–2009) – pornographic film actress
- Zoë Chao (born 1985) – actress
- Harry Cicma (born 1982) – Emmy Award-winning sports anchor, professional tennis player
- Amanda Clayton (born 1981) – actress, City on a Hill
- Nicholas Colasanto (1924–1985) – actor and director, Cheers
- Michael Corrente (born 1959) – film director and producer
- Olivia Culpo (born 1992) – Miss Rhode Island USA 2012, Miss USA 2012, Miss Universe 2012
- Sam Daly (born 1984) – actor
- Viola Davis (born 1965) – Academy Award-winning actress
- Charlie Day (born 1976) – actor, It's Always Sunny in Philadelphia
- Vin Di Bona (born 1944) – television producer
- Eddie Dowling (1895–1976) – actor
- Alice Drummond (1929–2016) – actress
- Jack Duffy (1882–1939) – film actor
- Nelson Eddy (1901–1967) – actor and singer
- Susan Eisenberg (born 1964) – voice actress
- Mark Famiglietti (born 1979) – actor
- Bobby Farrelly (born 1958) – film director
- Peter Farrelly (born 1956) – film director
- Mat Franco (born 1988) – magician, America's Got Talent winner
- Matt Fraser (born 1991) – psychic and television personality
- Peter Frechette (born 1956) – actor
- Peter Gerety (born 1940) – actor
- Joanna Going (born 1963) – actress
- Spalding Gray (1941–2004) – actor and writer
- Richard Hart (1915–1951) – actor
- Elisabeth Hasselbeck (born 1977) – television personality
- Ray Harrington (born 1983) – comedian
- Richard Hatch (born 1961) – reality television contestant
- Jason Hawes (born 1971) – television actor
- David Hedison (1927–2019) – actor
- Brian Helgeland (born 1961) – screenwriter, film producer and director
- Ruth Hussey (1911–2005) – Academy Award-nominated actress
- Sam Hyde (born 1985) – comedian
- Thomas Harper Ince (1882–1924) – film producer, director, actor
- Richard Jenkins (born 1947) – Academy Award-nominated actor
- Joyce Jillson (1946–2004) – actress, author, and astrologer
- Van Johnson (1916–2008) – actor, The Caine Mutiny, Brigadoon
- Claudia Jordan (born 1973) – Miss Rhode Island Teen USA 1997
- Ted Knight (1923–1986) – actor, The Mary Tyler Moore Show, Caddyshack
- Geoffrey Lewis (1935–2015) – actor
- Eric Lutes (born 1962) – actor

M–Z

- Seth MacFarlane (born 1973) – voice actor, creator of Family Guy, American Dad!, The Cleveland Show, and Ted
- George Macready (1899–1973) – actor
- Mike Maronna (born 1977) – actor
- Jason Marsden (born 1975) – actor
- Louis B. Mayer (1884–1957) – film producer and MGM studio mogul
- Matt McCarthy (born 1979) – comedian, actor
- Ron McLarty (1947–2020) – actor, playwright, novelist
- Michaela McManus (born 1983) – actress, Law & Order: SVU, One Tree Hill
- Caroline McWilliams (1945–2010) – actress
- Debra Messing (born 1968) – actress, Will and Grace
- Shanna Moakler (born 1975) – Miss Rhode Island Teen USA 1992, Miss New York USA 1995, Miss USA 1995
- Mark Morettini (born 1962) – actor, Prison Break
- Christopher Murney (born 1943) – actor
- Arden Myrin (born 1973) – actress
- Brendan O'Malley (born 1969) – actor and writer
- Vincent Pagano (born 1967) – actor
- Pauly D (born 1980) – television personality, DJ, cast member of Jersey Shore
- David Petrarca (born 1962) – film, television and theatre director
- Ben Powers (1950–2015) – actor, Rowan & Martin's Laugh-In
- Ford Rainey (1908–2005) – actor
- Don Reo (born 1946) – television producer
- Kali Rocha (born 1971) – actress
- Charles Rocket (1945–2005) – actor
- Josh Schwartz (born 1976) – television producer
- Dave Shalansky (born 1973) – actor
- Chris Sparling (born 1977) – screenwriter and director
- Christopher Stanley (born 1965) – actor, Henry Francis on Mad Men
- Mena Suvari (born 1979) – actress, American Beauty
- Saucy Sylvia (1921–2017) – comedian, singer, radio personality
- Erika Van Pelt (born 1985) – American Idol finalist
- Meredith Vieira (born 1953) – television personality
- David S. Ward (born 1945) – film director, Academy Award-winning screenwriter (The Sting)
- Desiree Washington (born 1973) – model
- James Woods (born 1947) – Academy Award-nominated actor

== Journalism ==
- Allen Bestwick (born 1961) – sportscaster
- Angelo Cataldi (born 1951) – sportscaster
- David Hartman (born 1935) – actor, television personality
- Irving R. Levine (1922–2009) – journalist
- Walter Mossberg (born 1947) – columnist
- Al Rockoff (born 1946) – photographer
- George Schuyler (1895–1977) – author, journalist
- A. O. Scott (born 1966) – film critic
- Jeff Stein (born 1944) – columnist, blogger
- Doug White (1944–2006) – television newscaster
- Jack White (1942–2005) – journalist

== Military ==
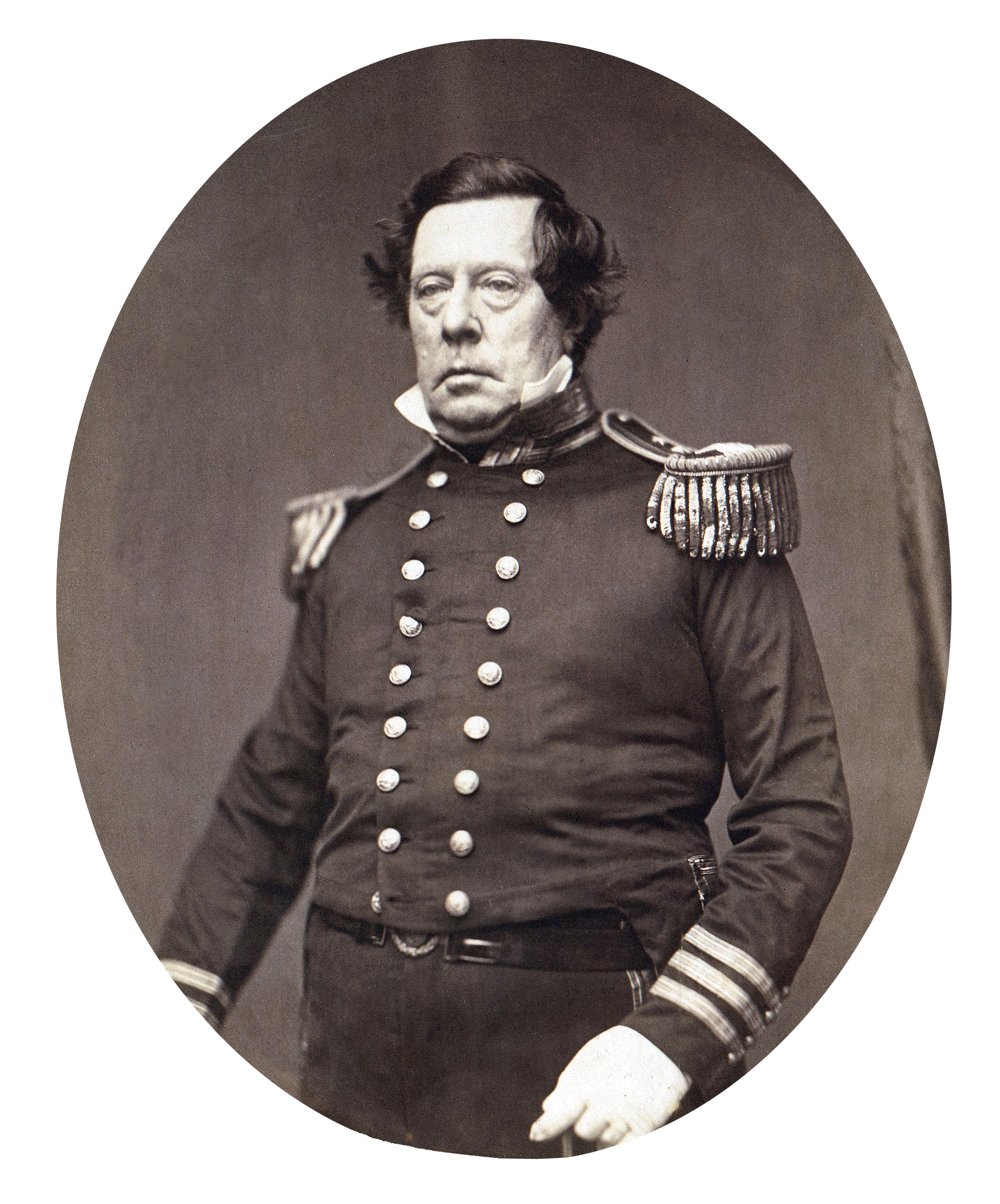
Matthew C. Perry

- William Henry Allen (1784–1813) – Navy officer
- John Nicholas Brown II (1900–1979) – United States Assistant Secretary of the Navy (AIR)
- Ambrose Burnside (1824–1881) – Army officer
- Stephen Champlin (1789–1870) – Navy officer
- Godfrey Chevalier (1889–1922) – Navy officer
- Nathanael Greene (1742–1786) – Continental Army officer, considered George Washington's most gifted officer
- Esek Hopkins (1718–1802) – commander in chief of the Continental Navy during the American Revolutionary War
- Leon J. LaPorte (born 1946) – Army officer, former U.S. Forces Korea commander
- George Luz (1921–1998) –- member of famed Easy Company 506th, 101st
- Matthew C. Perry (1794–1858) – Navy officer
- Oliver Hazard Perry (1785–1819) – Navy officer
- Elisha Hunt Rhodes (1842–1917) – Army
- Isaac P. Rodman (1822–1862) – Army officer
- James Mitchell Varnum (1748–1789) – general in the Continental Army during the American Revolutionary War
- Samuel Ward Jr. (1756–1832) – American Revolutionary War soldier and delegate to the secessionist Hartford Convention
- Frank Wheaton (1833–1903) – Army officer
- Abraham Whipple (1733–1819) – Continental Navy commander-in-chief
- David B. Champagne (1932–1952) – Medal of Honor recipient

== Music ==
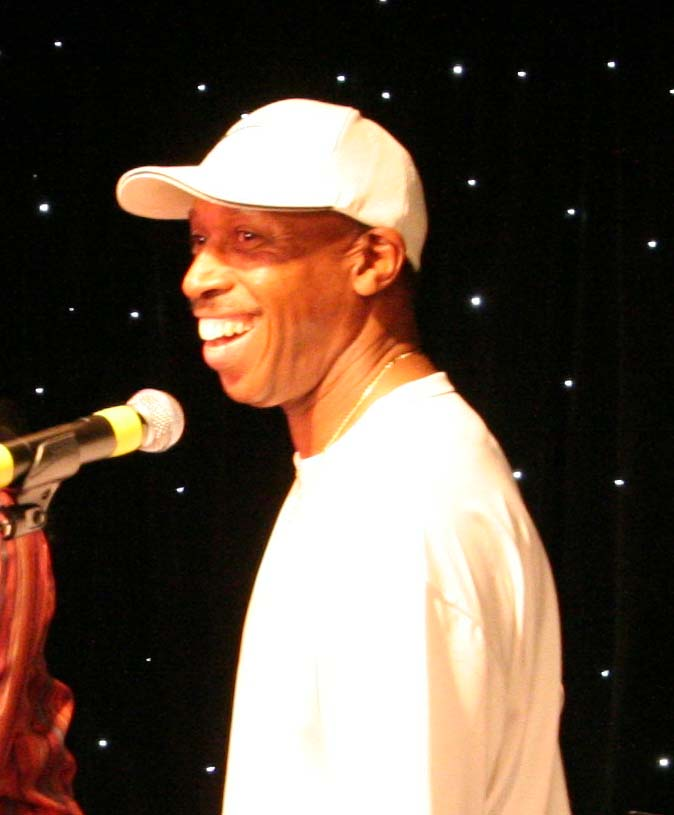
Jeffrey Osborne

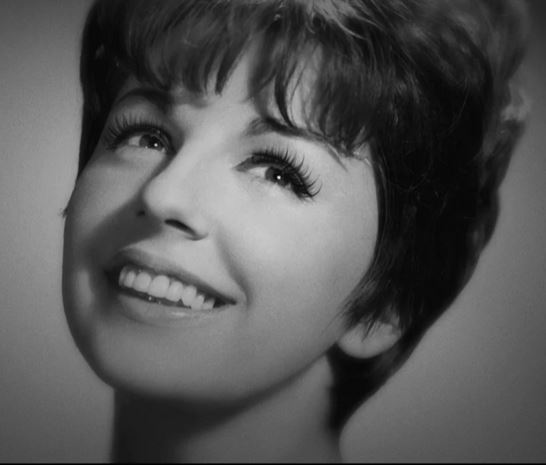
Carol Sloane

- Greg Abate (born 1947) – jazz musician
- Stevie Aiello (born 1983) – founding member of Monty Are I, and touring musician with Thirty Seconds to Mars
- AraabMuzik (born 1989) – record producer and DJ
- Dicky Barrett (born 1964) – popular musician, frontman of The Mighty Mighty Bosstones, announcer for Jimmy Kimmel Live!
- David Blue (1941–1982) – singer-songwriter
- John Cafferty (born 1950) – musician known for work with the Beaver Brown Band and for the Eddie and the Cruisers soundtrack
- Blu Cantrell (born 1976) – musician
- Wendy Carlos (born 1939) – composer and electronic music pioneer
- George M. Cohan (1878–1942) – entertainer, singer, dancer, subject of the film, Yankee Doodle Dandy
- Bill Conti (born 1942) – film music composer, Rocky
- Bill Cowsill (1948–2006) – musician
- Tanya Donelly (born 1966) – musician
- John Dwyer (born 1974) – multi-instrumentalist, vocalist, songwriter, visual artist, and record label owner
- Eileen Farrell (1920–2002) – opera singer
- Sage Francis (born 1976) – musician
- Billy Gilman (born 1988) – musician
- Al Gomes (born 1960) – record producer and songwriter
- Lukasz Gottwald (born 1973) – songwriter
- Bobby Hackett (1915–1976) – jazz musician
- Scott Hamilton (born 1954) – jazz tenor saxophonist
- Kristin Hersh (born 1966) – musician
- Jon B. (born 1974) – musician
- Jvke (born 2001) – singer, songwriter, producer
- Jesse Leach (born 1978) – popular musician
- Mapei (born 1983) – recording artist
- Alexis Marshall (born 1980) – vocalist for the experimental rock band Daughters
- Dave McKenna (1930–2008) – jazz pianist
- Paul Motian (1931–2011) – jazz drummer, composer, bandleader
- Nico Muhly (born 1981) – contemporary classical music composer
- David Narcizo (born 1966) – musician
- David Olney (1948–2020) – musician
- Jeffrey Osborne (born 1948) – musician
- Mike Renzi (born 1946) – pianist
- Duke Robillard (born 1948) – blues musician
- Kim Schifino – musician
- Carol Sloane (1937–2023) – jazz singer
- Mike Stud (born 1988) – rapper, former athlete
- Erika Van Pelt (born 1985) – singer
- Leon Wilkeson (1952–2001) – bassist for Lynyrd Skynyrd
- Don Wise (born 1942) – tenor saxophonist, music producer, songwriter
- Arizona Zervas (born 1995) – rapper, composer, singer

== Politics and government ==
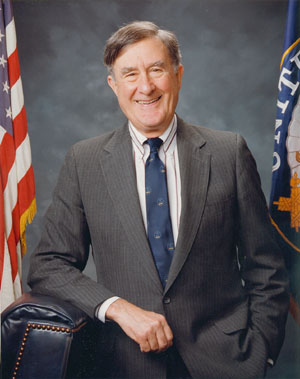
John Chafee

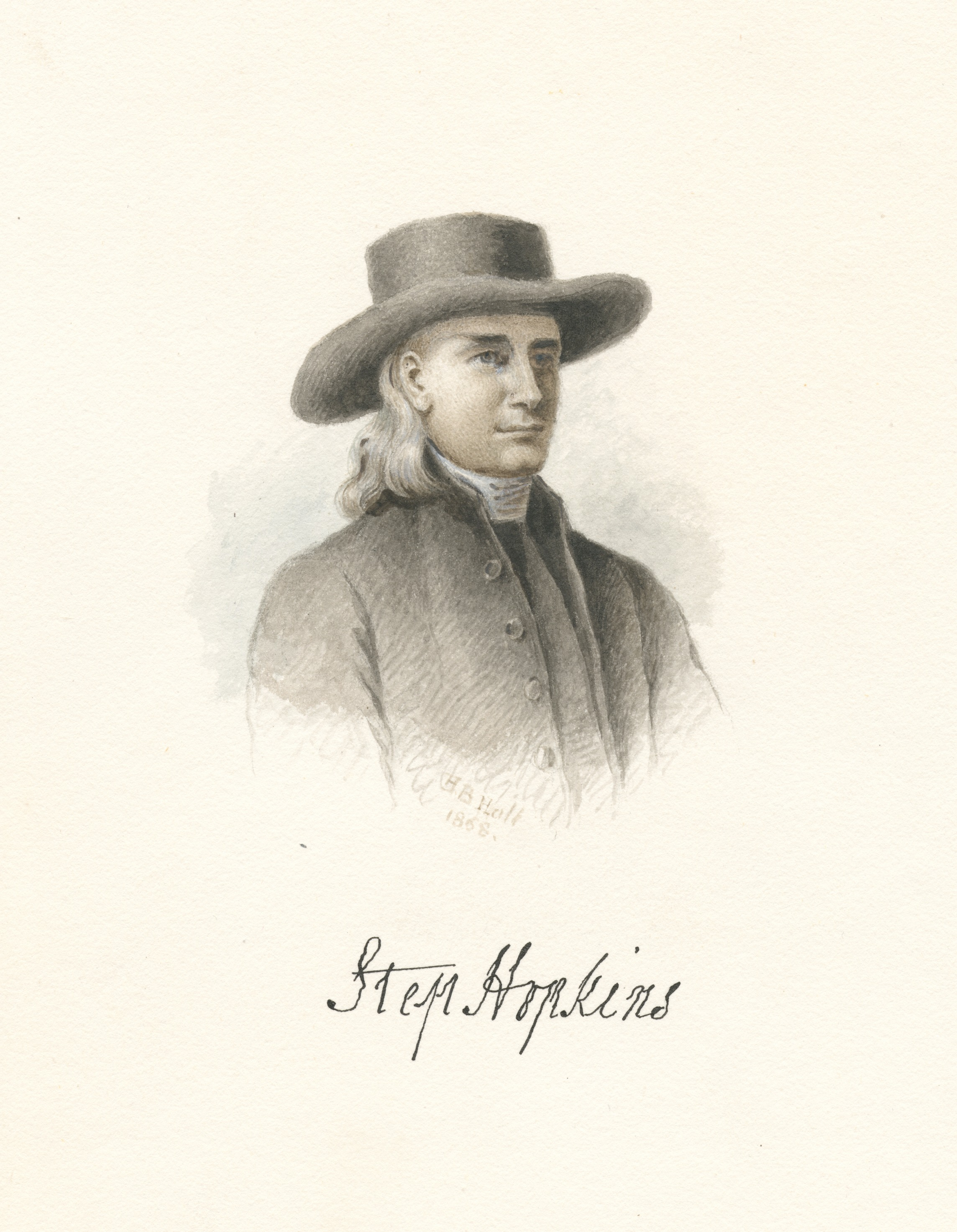
Stephen Hopkins

A–L

- Lincoln Almond (1936–2023) – former governor
- Thomas Angell (1618–1694) – co-founder of the Colony of Rhode Island and Providence Plantations
- Jonathan Earle Arnold (1814–1869) – member of the Wisconsin Territorial Council
- Peleg Arnold (1751–1820) – lawyer, tavern-keeper, jurist, and statesman
- Joshua Babcock (1707–1783) – physician, American Revolution general, state Supreme Court justice, and postmaster
- Latimer Whipple Ballou (1812–1900) – member of the House of Representatives
- Sullivan Ballou (1829–1861) – state representative and Army officer
- Oliver Belmont (1858–1908) – charter member of the Rhode Island Society of Sons of the Revolution, representative for New York
- Charles R. Brayton (1840–1910) – politician and lobbyist whom The New York Times called the "Blind Boss of Rhode Island"
- Samuel W. Bridgham (1776–1740) – first mayor of Providence
- Frank Caprio (1936–2025) – judge and television performer
- John Chafee (1922–1999) – U.S. senator
- Lincoln Chafee (born 1953) – U.S. senator, governor of Rhode Island, presidential candidate
- Vincent "Buddy" Cianci Jr. (1941–2016) – former mayor of Providence
- David Cicilline (born 1961) – Representative and Mayor of Providence
- William Coddington (1601–1678) – magistrate of the Colony of Rhode Island and Providence Plantations, judge of Portsmouth, judge of Newport, governor of Portsmouth and Newport, deputy governor of the entire colony, and governor of the colony
- Thomas Corcoran (1900–1981) – member of President Franklin Roosevelt's "Brain Trust" during the New Deal; advisor to President Lyndon B. Johnson
- Percy Daniels (1840–1916) – Populist politician
- Edward D. DiPrete (1934–2025) – former governor of Rhode Island
- Thomas E. Donilon (born 1955) – National Security adviser under President Barack Obama
- Thomas A. Doyle (1827–1886) – mayor of Providence for eighteen years
- Job Durfee (1790–1847) – congressman
- Elisha Dyer Jr. (1839–1906) – 45th governor of Rhode Island, mayor of Providence
- William Ellery (1727–1820) – a signer of the United States Declaration of Independence as a representative of Rhode Island
- Arthur Fenner (1745–1805) – fourth governor of Rhode Island
- Michael Flynn (born 1958) – retired Army lieutenant general and National Security Advisor
- Theodore Foster (1752–1828) – one of the first two United States senators from Rhode Island
- Samuel Gorton (1593–1677) – settled Warwick
- Daniel L. D. Granger (1852–1909) – representative and mayor of Providence
- Theodore F. Green (1867–1966) – United States senator, 57th governor of Rhode Island, and namesake of T. F. Green Airport
- Christopher R. Hill (born 1952) – diplomat, Assistant Secretary of State for East Asian and Pacific Affairs
- Stephen Hopkins (1707–1785) – governor of Rhode Island, RI Supreme Court justice, signatory of the Declaration of Independence
- Joseph B. Keenan (1888–1954) – chief prosecutor in the International Military Tribunal for the Far East
- Ambrose Kennedy (1875–1967) – congressman
- Kat Kerwin (born 1997) – former politician who served as the youngest member of the Providence City Council 2019–2023
- Pat LaMarche (born 1960) – Green Party presidential candidate
- William C. Lovering (1835–1910) – congressman

M–Z

- Tiara Mack (born 1993) – state senator
- James McAndrews (1862–1942) – congressman
- William McCormick (born 1939) – diplomat, United States ambassador to New Zealand
- J. Howard McGrath (1903–1966) – governor of Rhode Island, solicitor general, senator, chairman of the Democratic National Committee, and attorney general of the United States
- Edwin D. McGuinness (1856–1901) – first Irish-Catholic mayor of Providence
- Florence K. Murray (1916–2004) – officer in Women's Army Corps, first female state senator in Rhode Island, first female judge in Rhode Island, and first female member of the Rhode Island Supreme Court
- Dee Dee Myers (born 1961) – White House press secretary
- Annette Nazareth (born 1956) – commissioner of the Securities and Exchange Commission
- Joseph R. Paolino Jr. – U.S. ambassador to Malta, former mayor of Providence
- John O. Pastore (1907–2000) – governor of Rhode Island, Senator
- Claiborne Pell (1918–2009) – senator, diplomat, sponsor of Pell grants
- Aram J. Pothier (1854–1928) – governor of Rhode Island, banker
- Jack Reed (born 1949) – senator
- Dennis J. Roberts (1903–1994) – 63rd governor of Rhode Island
- Christopher Robinson (1806–1889) – congressman
- James Y. Smith (1809–1876) – mayor of Providence and 29th governor of Rhode Island
- Sean Spicer (born 1971) – White House press secretary for President Donald Trump
- William Sprague (1799–1856) – 14th governor, a U.S. representative, and senator
- William H. Sullivan (1922–2013) – U.S. ambassador
- Bruce Sundlun (1920–2011) – former governor
- Charles Tillinghast James (1805–1862) – U.S. senator
- Pat Toomey (born 1961) – senator for Pennsylvania
- Charles C. Van Zandt (1830–1894) – former governor
- Samuel Ward (1725–1776) – RI Supreme Court justice, governor of the Colony of Rhode Island and Providence Plantations, and delegate to the Continental Congress
- William West (1733–1816) – American Revolution general, lieutenant governor, RI Supreme Court justice, Anti-Federalist leader
- Sheldon Whitehouse (born 1955) – state attorney general, senator

== Religion ==
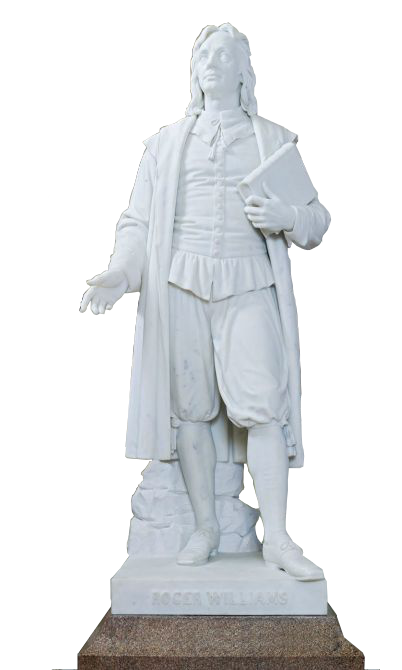
Roger Williams

- Alfred W. Anthony (1860–1939) – author, Free Will Baptist leader, and religion professor at Bates College
- Emeline S. Burlingame (1836–1923) – president, Rhode Island Woman’s Christian Temperance Union; president, Free Baptist Woman‘s Missionary Society
- William Ellery Channing (1780–1842) – Unitarian theologian
- John Clarke (1609–1676) – Baptist minister, co-founder of the Colony of Rhode Island and Providence Plantations, author of its influential charter, and a leading advocate of religious freedom in America
- Maurice Davis (1921–1993) – rabbi and human-rights activist
- Ernest Fortin (1923–2002) – Assumptionist and professor of theology at Boston College
- Mark Antony De Wolfe Howe (1808–1895) – Episcopal Church bishop
- Anne Hutchinson (1591–1643) – early settler of Newport, catalyst of the Antinomian Controversy
- James Manning (1738–1791) – American Baptist minister, co-founder and first president of the College in the English Colony of Rhode Island and Providence Plantations (Brown University)
- Edwards Amasa Park (1808–1900) – theologian
- Ezra Stiles (1727–1795) – Congregationalist minister and co-founder of the College in the English Colony of Rhode Island and Providence Plantations
- Roger Williams (1603–1684) – founder of the Colony of Rhode Island and Providence Plantations, influential author, considered the first proponent of separation of church and state

== Science ==
- Aaron T. Beck (1921–2021) – psychiatrist
- George Brayton (1830–1892) – mechanical engineer
- Joseph Brown (1733–1785) – astronomer
- Rita Charon (born 1949) – physician
- Solomon Drowne (1753–1834) – physician, academic, and surgeon during the American Revolution
- Sylvester Gardiner (1707–1786) – physician
- Stuart Gitlow (born 1962) – psychiatrist
- Frederic Poole Gorham (1871–1933) – bacteriologist
- Nathanael Herreshoff (1848–1938) – naval engineer
- Domina Jalbert (1904–1991) – inventor
- Melanie Sanford (born 1975) – chemist
- Sherwood C. Spring (born 1944) – astronaut
- Robert Henry Thurston (1839–1903) – first president of the ASME
- Frank E. Winsor (1870–1939) – civil engineer

== See also ==
- List of early settlers of Rhode Island
- List of Rhode Island suffragists

By educational institution affiliation

- List of Brown University people
- List of Bryant University alumni
- List of Rhode Island School of Design people

By location

- List of people from Cranston, Rhode Island
- List of people from Newport, Rhode Island
- List of people from Pawtucket, Rhode Island
- List of people from Providence, Rhode Island
- List of people from South Kingstown, Rhode Island
