= List of people from Pawtucket, Rhode Island =

The following list includes notable people who were born or have lived in Pawtucket, Rhode Island.

== Academics and scientists ==
- Aram Chobanian, cardiologist; ninth president of Boston University; born in Pawtucket
- Joel Garreau, journalist, editor and author (editor at The Washington Post)
- Martha Mitchell, author and longtime archivist at Brown University
- Minton Warren, scholar and Latin professor at Harvard University; born in Pawtucket

== Architecture ==
- James C. Bucklin (1801–1890), born in Pawtucket, became prominent Providence architect
- Charles E. Carpenter (1845–1923), born in Pawtucket, became partner in Stone, Carpenter & Willson of Providence
- C. Willis Damon (1850–1916), born in Pawtucket, became leading architect of Haverhill, Massachusetts
- Raymond Hood (1881–1934), born in Pawtucket, architect of Rockefeller Center and Tribune Tower
- Edwin L. Howland (1838–1876), born in Pawtucket, noted Providence architect
- Albert H. Humes (1867–1947), born in Pawtucket, became the city's leading 19th-century architect
- Lloyd W. Kent (1907–1991), born in Pawtucket, became prominent Providence architect
- R. C. N. Monahan (died 1963), leading 20th-century Pawtucket architect
- Edward I. Nickerson (1845–1908), born in Pawtucket, became architect in Providence
- John F. O'Malley, practiced in Pawtucket from 1919, designed City Hall

== Arts and culture ==
- Don Bousquet, cartoonist
- Wendy Carlos, musician
- Galway Kinnell, poet
- Armand LaMontagne, sculptor
- Abraham Nathanson (1929–2010), graphic designer; developer of Bananagrams; born in Pawtucket
- Sam Patch, daredevil
- Anne Morgan Spalter, artist
- Herb Weiss, Arts District overseer
- Gary Whitehead, poet and painter

== Business ==
- Samuel Slater, industrialist; considered "father of the American Industrial Revolution" by US president Andrew Jackson; lived in Pawtucket

== Film and TV ==
- Ruth Clifford, silent film star
- Michael Corrente, independent film director
- Alice Drummond, actress
- Jack Duffy, actor
- David Hartman, television personality
- Kevin Lima, film director

=== Journalism ===
- Dave Kane, radio talk show host
- Irving R. Levine, journalist and foreign correspondent
- Al Rockoff, photojournalist

== Music ==
- Wendy Carlos, composer and electronic musician
- JELEEL!, rapper, and singer
- Jon B, musician and singer
- Rosario Mazzeo, clarinetist
- Marty O'Brien, musician
- David Rawlings, musician

== Politics ==
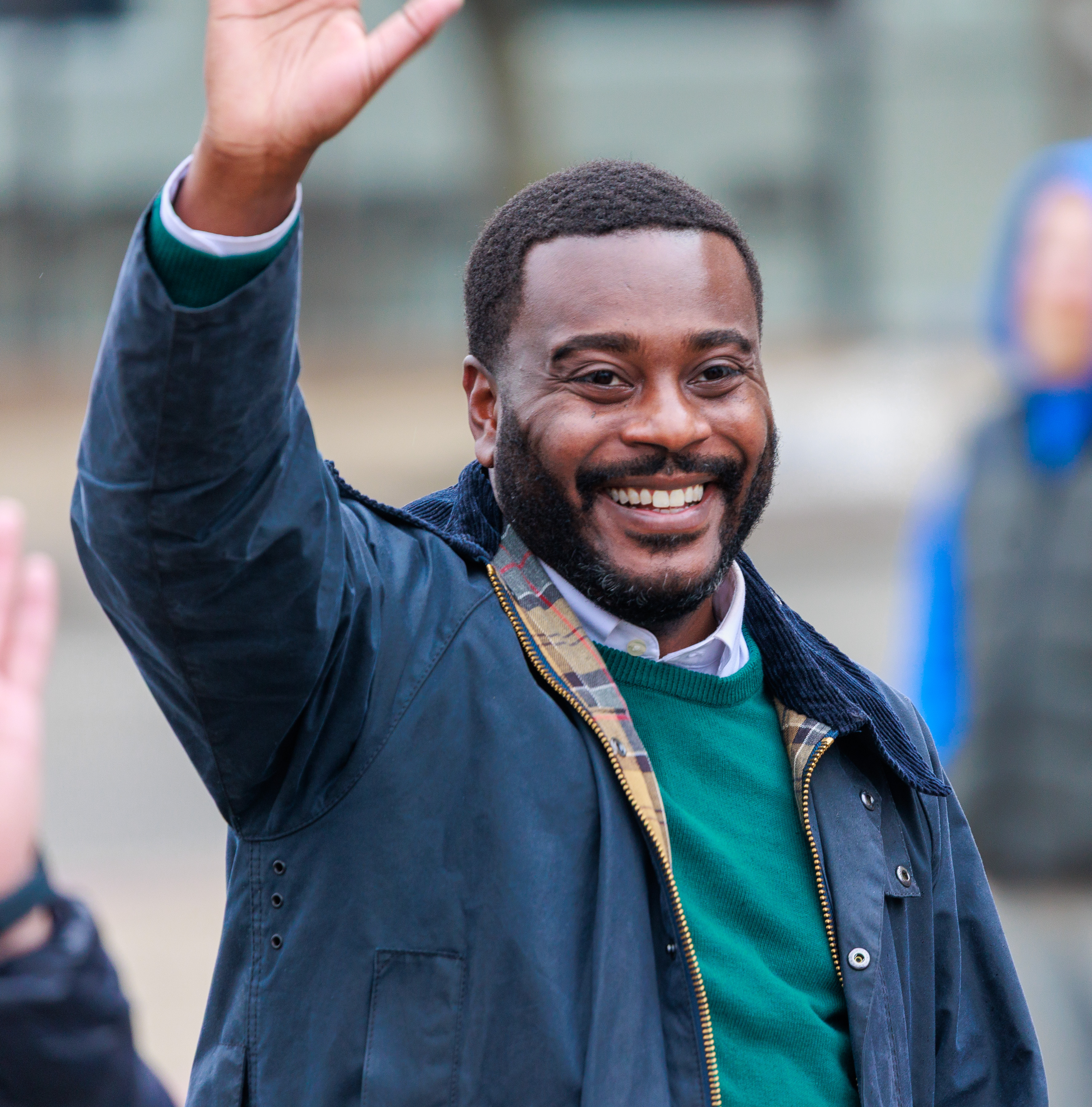
Gabe Amo in the 2025 Pawtucket Saint Patrick's Day Parade

- Lincoln Almond, 72nd governor of Rhode Island; born in Pawtucket
- Gabe Amo, US representative, Congressional District 1, Rhode Island
- Mary-Ann Baldwin, mayor of Raleigh, North Carolina; born in Pawtucket
- Willard L. Beaulac, U.S. ambassador to Paraguay, Colombia, Cuba, Chile and Argentina; born in Pawtucket
- David Carlin, author and politician: majority leader of RI Senate (1989–1990); born and grew up in Pawtucket
- Thomas Gardiner Corcoran, presidential advisor to Franklin D. Roosevelt and Lyndon B. Johnson; born in Pawtucket
- John W. Davis, 38th and 41st governor of Rhode Island
- Joseph L. Fisher, U.S. representative from Virginia's 10th congressional district; born in Pawtucket
- Louis Monast, U.S. representative from Rhode Island; immigrated to Pawtucket from Quebec, Canada as a child
- John A. Sabatini, Rhode Island state senator
- Samuel Starkweather, 7th mayor of Cleveland; born in Pawtucket

== Religion ==
- Susan Hammond Barney (1834–1922), evangelist

== Sports ==
=== Baseball ===
- Louise Arnold, player in All-American Girls Professional Baseball League; born in Pawtucket
- John LaRose, pitcher for the Boston Red Sox; born in Pawtucket
- Chet Nichols Jr., pitcher for the Boston/Milwaukee Braves, Boston Red Sox, and Cincinnati Reds; born in Pawtucket
- Ken Ryan, pitcher for the Boston Red Sox and Philadelphia Phillies; born in Pawtucket

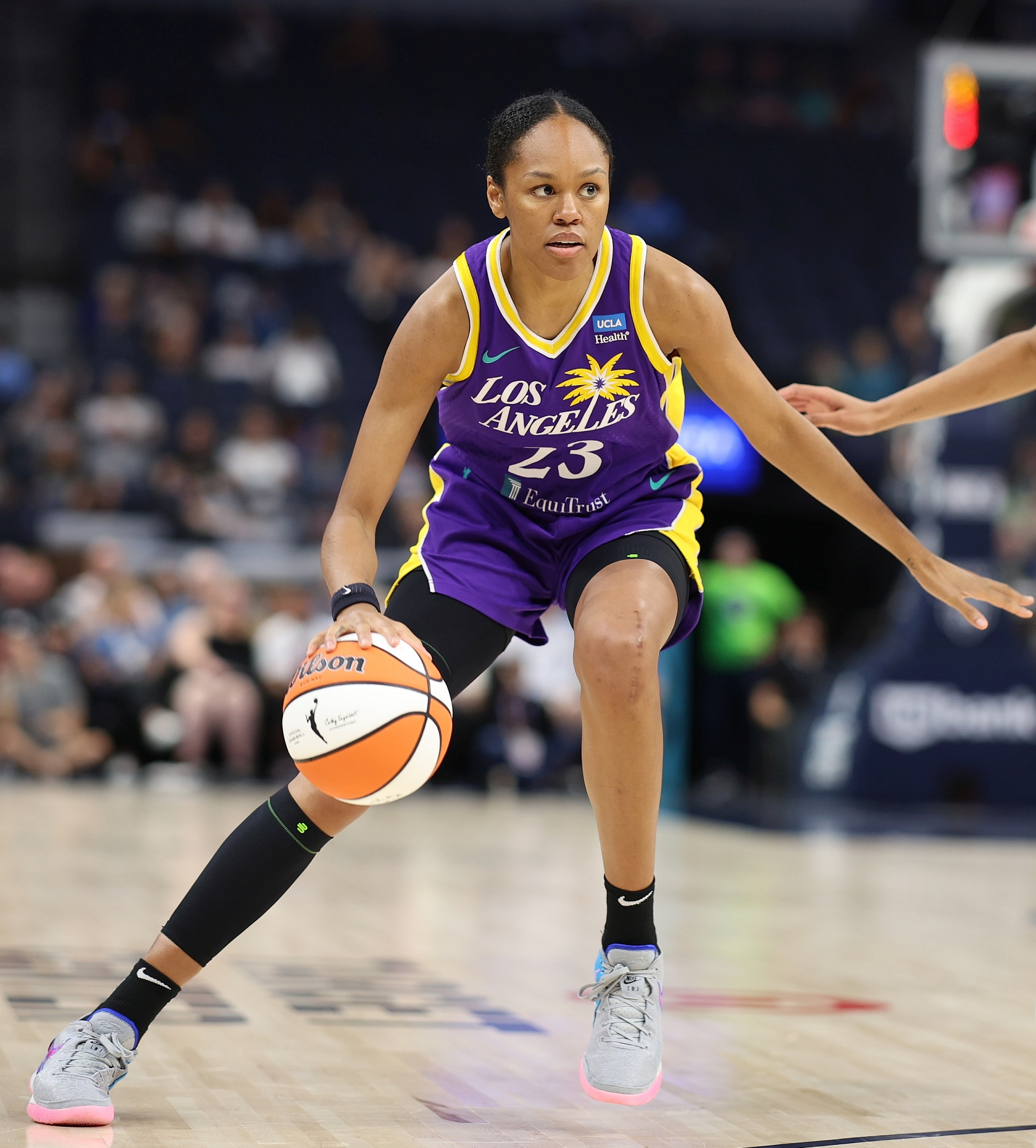
Azurá Stevens

=== Basketball ===
- Ernie Calverley, point guard for the Providence Steamrollers; born in Pawtucket
- Rakim Sanders, shooting guard for Hapoel Gilboa Galil in Israel; born in Pawtucket
- Azurá Stevens, forward for the Los Angeles Sparks; born in Pawtucket
- Jeff Xavier, point and shooting guard with four teams in the Spanish LEB Oro league; born in Pawtucket

=== Boxing ===
- Peter Manfredo Jr., middleweight boxer (held multiple titles); trained at his family's gym in Pawtucket

=== Football ===
- Charles Avedisian, Providence College football captain, 1940; inducted into PC Hall of Fame, 1972; guard, New York Football Giants 1942–1944; William E. Tolman High School graduate, 1936
- Gerry Philbin, defensive end for the New York Jets, Philadelphia Eagles and Charlotte Hornets (WFL); born in Pawtucket
- Hank Soar, running and defensive back for the New York Giants; Major League Baseball umpire; died in Pawtucket

=== Horse racing ===
- Red Pollard, jockey best known for riding Seabiscuit; founding member of the Jockeys' Guild (1940); died in Pawtucket

=== Hockey ===
- Keith Carney, former NHL defenseman who is from Pawtucket, played in the NHL from 1992 to 2009, also played for team USA's men's hockey team in the 1998 Olympics
- Russ McCurdy, first women's hockey coach at the University of New Hampshire (1977–1992); played on team USA's men's hockey team in 1963

=== Olympics ===
- Janet Moreau, track and field athlete, 1952 Summer Olympics gold medalist; born in Pawtucket

=== Running ===
- Les Pawson, 3-time Boston Marathon winner; born in Pawtucket

=== Wrestling ===
- Tiny the Terrible, wrestler and politician who ran for Pawtucket mayor in 2006
- Tim White, referee and producer with World Wrestling Entertainment (WWE)

=== Track & field ===
- Robert Howard, 9-time NCAA champion in triple jump/long jump
