= Joseph B. Keenan =

American politician (1888–1954)

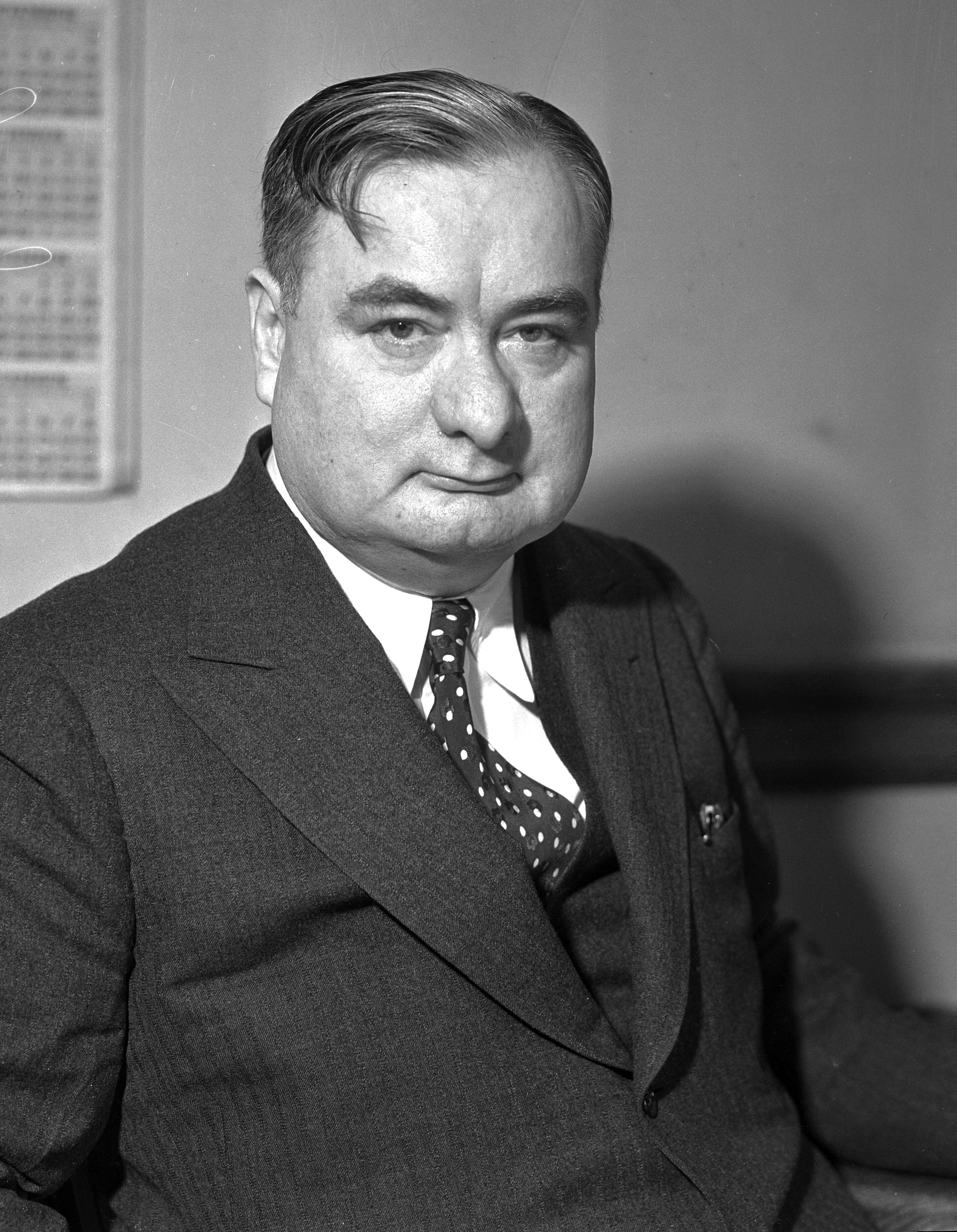
Joseph B. Keenan

Joseph Berry Keenan (11 January 1888 – 8 December 1954) was an American lawyer best known for serving as Chief Prosecutor for the International Military Tribunal for the Far East. He previously served as Assistant Attorney General in the administration of President Franklin D. Roosevelt.

== Early life ==
Keenan was born on January 11, 1888, in Pawtucket, Rhode Island. He graduated from Brown University in Providence, Rhode Island, in 1910, and earned his law degree from Harvard Law School, located in Cambridge, Massachusetts, in 1913. Keenan fought in France during World War I, and later joined the Judge Advocate General's Corps.

== Legal career ==
In 1919, Keenan became a Special Assistant to the Ohio Attorney General, with a focus on combating organized crime. He was recruited by U.S. Attorney General Homer Stille Cummings to serve as a Special Assistant at the U.S. Department of Justice in 1933. His role was to help address an organized crime wave that was hitting America. During this time, Keenan led prosecutions against notable gangsters during the Depression, including Machine Gun Kelly and members of the Barker-Karpis gang.

In January 1934, President Franklin D. Roosevelt appointed Keenan to serve as Assistant Attorney General for the Criminal Division. In this role, he was a key liaison between the White House and Congress on issues including legislation addressing kidnapping and organized crime. He played an important role in the drafting of the Federal Kidnapping Act, which had been prompted by the kidnapping and murder of Charles Lindbergh's toddler son.

In November 1945, President Harry S. Truman appointed Keenan as Chief Prosecutor for the International Military Tribunal for the Far East, also known as the Tokyo Tribunal. As Chief Prosecutor, he led efforts to investigate and prosecute war crimes committed by Japanese leaders during World War II. This included prosecuting 28 high-ranking wartime defendants, such as former Prime Minister Hideki Tojo.

== Death and legacy ==
Keenan died in 1954 in Asheboro, North Carolina.

== See also ==
- List of people from Rhode Island
