= Encyclopedia Brunoniana =

- Title page for Encyclopedia Brunoniana (1993)
- Author: Martha Mitchell
- Language: English
- Subject: Reference
- Publisher: Brown University Library
- Publication date: 1993
- Publication place: United States
- Pages: 629

Encyclopedia Brunoniana is an American reference work by Martha Mitchell covering Brown University. Published in 1993 by the Brown University Library, the encyclopedia has 629 pages. A digital version can be read free of charge on the Internet. Mitchell was the university's longtime archivist and "unofficial historian" until she retired in 2003; she died in 2011.

Encyclopedia Brunoniana serves as a reference for the Brown community on the university's history. It includes articles on Brown's departments, publications, buildings, and people associated with the university.
