= Marietta Stanley Case =

American poet and temperance advocate (1845–1900)

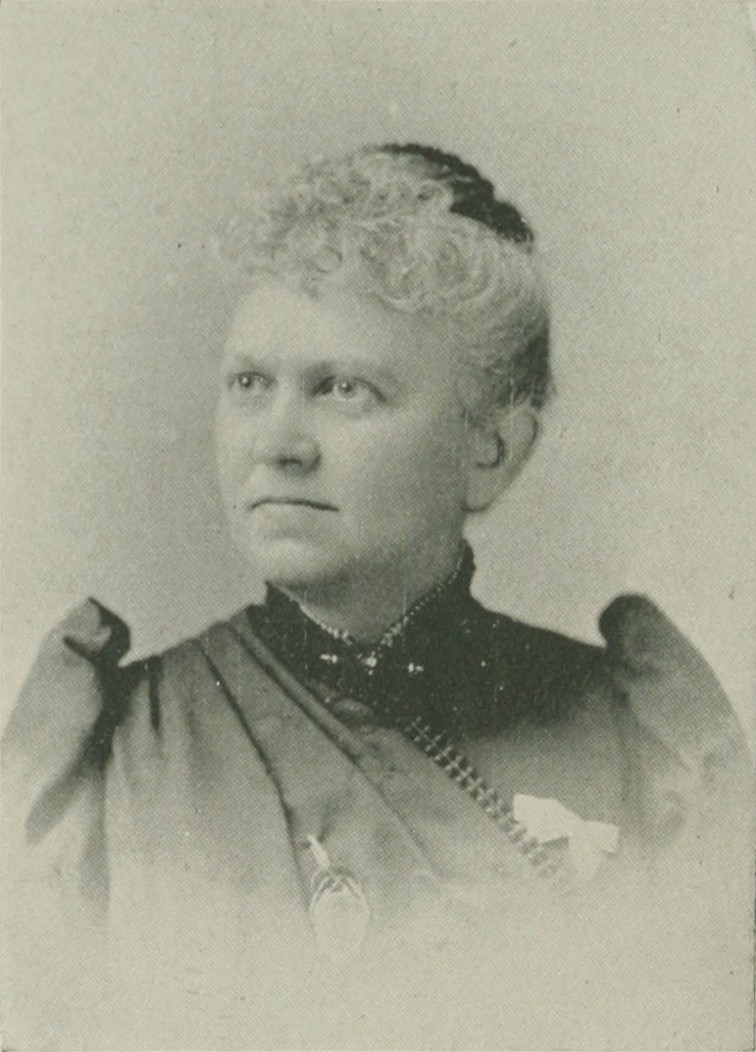
- "A Woman of the Century"
- Born: Marietta Frances Stanley; August 22, 1845; Thompson, Connecticut
- Died: 21 July 1900 (aged 54); South Manchester, Connecticut
- Education: East Greenwich Academy
- Occupations: poet; temperance advocate
- Spouse: Albert Willard Case (m. 1868)
- Children: 3
- Writing career
- Language: English
- Notable works: "The Waning Century"; "Amorpatioe"; "Amor Patriæ"

Marietta Stanley Case (née, Stanley; August 22, 1845 – 21 July 1900) was a 19th-century American poet and temperance advocate. Her very best poems were entitled, "The Waning Century" and "Amorpatioe", the latter being written for the Daughters of the American Revolution (D.A.R.), as well as "Amor Patriæ", written for her alma mater. She was one of the Connecticut women authors given creditable mention at the Cotton States and International Exposition (Atlanta, 1895).

== Early life and education ==
Marietta Frances Stanley was born in Thompson, Connecticut, August 22, 1845. The Stanleys were of Norman descent. Matthew Stanley, the paternal ancestor of Case, came to the U.S. in 1646 and settled in Massachusetts. Her father, Rev. Edwin S. Stanley, was a retired Methodist clergyman of the New England Southern Conference, of Puritan and Revolutionary War ancestry. Her mother's maiden name was Laura Carpenter. She had at least three siblings, brothers Robert and Edward, and a sister, Ella.

While yet a schoolgirl, Case wrote short poems for various papers. She wrote the commencement poem upon her graduation in 1866 from the East Greenwich Academy, East Greenwich, Rhode Island.

== Career ==
She wrote little during the years intervening between her having school and the year 1884, for she believed that her domestic duties and the care and education of her children ought to occupy her whole time.

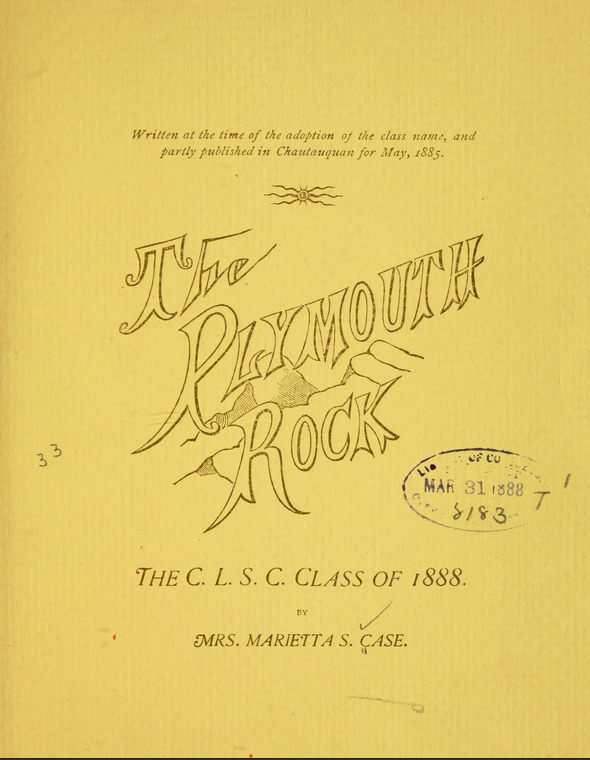
"The Plymouth Rock" (1885)

She graduated in Chautauqua in the class of 1888, and wrote a poem for the class, “The Plymouth Rock". She wrote poems for leading religious and temperance papers, and some of them were issued in booklet form. She also wrote a poem, “The Waning Century", for the grand reunion of alumni of East Greenwich Academy in 1890. By invitation of the Board of Lady Managers of Connecticut, five of her brochures were sent to the World's Fair for that library. Among her best was "Amor Patriæ", dedicated to the D.A.R. Among her last was "At the Front", published in The Courant, a few months before Case's death.

Case was interested in all work that had the uplifting of humanity for its object, and was especially interested in woman's temperance, home and foreign missionary work. She held various offices in home and foreign missionary work.

Through the service of her mother's grandfather in the Revolutionary War, Case was a member of the D.A.R. and was appointed regent for Manchester.

== Personal life ==
In June, 1868, she married Albert Willard Case, a paper manufacturer of South Manchester, Connecticut, where they since resided. She had three children, two daughters and a son.

In religion, she was a member of the South Methodist Church.

Marietta Stanley Case died 21 July 1900 at her home in the Highland Park neighborhood of South Manchester, Connecticut.

== Selected works ==
- The Plymouth Rock: The C. L. S. C. Class of 1888, 1888
- "The Waning Century"
- "Amorpatioe" (or "Amor Patriæ")
- "At the Front"
