= Bert Shurtleff =

American football player (1897–1967)

Profile
- Positions: Center, Guard

Personal information
- Born: August 3, 1897; Adamsville, Rhode Island, US
- Died: 1967
- Listed height: 5 ft 11 in (1.80 m)
- Listed weight: 190 lb (86 kg)

Career information
- High school: East Greenwich (RI) Academy
- College: Brown

Career history
- Providence Steam Roller (1925–1926); Boston Bulldogs (1929)

Career statistics
- Games played: 15
- Games started: 5
- Stats at Pro Football Reference

Bertrand Leslie Shurtleff (3 Aug. 1897 – 15 Feb. 1967) was an American football offensive lineman who spent three seasons in the National Football League with the Providence Steam Roller (1925-1926) and the Boston Bulldogs (1929) after playing for Brown University. Later he was a professional wrestler, teacher, public speaker, and author.

== Biography ==
=== Early life ===
Bertrand Leslie Shurtleff was born August 3, 1897, in Adamsville, Rhode Island, to Eugene Kossuth Shurtleff (1856 - 1942) and Hattie Elma Cook (1898 - 1943). He was the seventh of their ten children.

At age 14 Shurtleff set out on his own and became self-supporting. At age 18, he went back to school, attending East Greenwich Academy and preparing for college in three years. At the start of World War I, he enlisted in the U.S. Naval Reserve Force. He stayed in school for a time then spent the summer working in a powder factory in New Jersey. Going into the active service, he trained at Newport, Rhode Island and served at State Pier in New London, Connecticut until he was sent to Brown University to study for a commission.

When the war ended, he stayed at Brown, where he participated in wrestling and football. Shurtleff wrestled four years at Brown and won the New England Intercollegiate lightweight wrestling title in 1919–20. He paid his way through college working at odd jobs at everything from construction to crewing on a fruit boat to Costa Rica. Shurtleff was a member of the fraternity Lambda Chi Alpha and graduated with the Class of 1922.

=== Career ===
Shurtleff wrote a little book of original verse while still a student at Brown University and sold 2,000 copies in 1922–23. He was a professional football player for seven years, seeing action with the New York Giants, Providence Steamroller and Boston Bulldogs. Later he wrestled professionally under the name "Mad Murdock" and ran a wrestling carnival, meeting all comers.

His first novel, Carey's Carnival was published in London by Hurst and Blackett. Charleston Bound, a novel about Rhode Islanders in the American Revolution, was also published by Hurst and Blackett under the pen name, S. B. Leslie. Between 1938 and 1963 Shurtleff had 14 books published and placed stories in about 30 magazines.

In addition to teaching and coaching, Shurtleff lectured widely at high schools, civic clubs and other groups on the fakery in professional wrestling. He also attempted to break into the movies. He was considered a possibility to replace the late Louis Wolheim. He made several trips to Hollywood, getting only bit parts and writing scenarios.

=== Marriage and children ===
On August 3, 1922, Bertrand L Shurtleff was married to Hope C. Seal. They had three children.

- Jeane (1923 – 1981 )
- Faith (1928 – 1997)
- David (1930 – )

Shurtleff married second Margaret D. Dorgan on Aug. 3, 1946.

=== Death ===
Bertrand Shurtleff died on February 15, 1967, in Orange County, California.

== Published works ==
=== Poetry ===
- 1922:Songs at Anchor

=== Series books ===
==== AWOL Series ====
- 1944:AWOL K-9 Commando
- 1946:AWOL Musters Out
- 1948:AWOL at Large (The British edition of AWOL Musters Out)
- 1948:AWOL the Rajah
- 1951:AWOL the Courier

==== Huskie and Spareribs ====
- 1949:Two Against the North: A Story of Huskie and Spareribs
- 1952:Escape from the Icecap: A Tale of Huskie and Spareribs

=== Other novels ===
- 1938:Carey's Carnival (as Bert Shurtleff)
- 1939:Charleston Bound (as S.B. Leslie)
- 1945:Short Leash
- 1947:Long Lash
- 1951:Colt of the Alcan Road
- 1953:Flying Footballs
- 1963:Ten Fathoms by Scuba

Bertrand Shurtleff also wrote many short stories that were published in popular magazines such as Argosy, Amazing Stories, Astounding Science Fiction and others.

== Honours, decorations, awards and distinctions ==
The Brown University Athletic Hall of Fame
