= Mary H. Gray Clarke =

American journalist

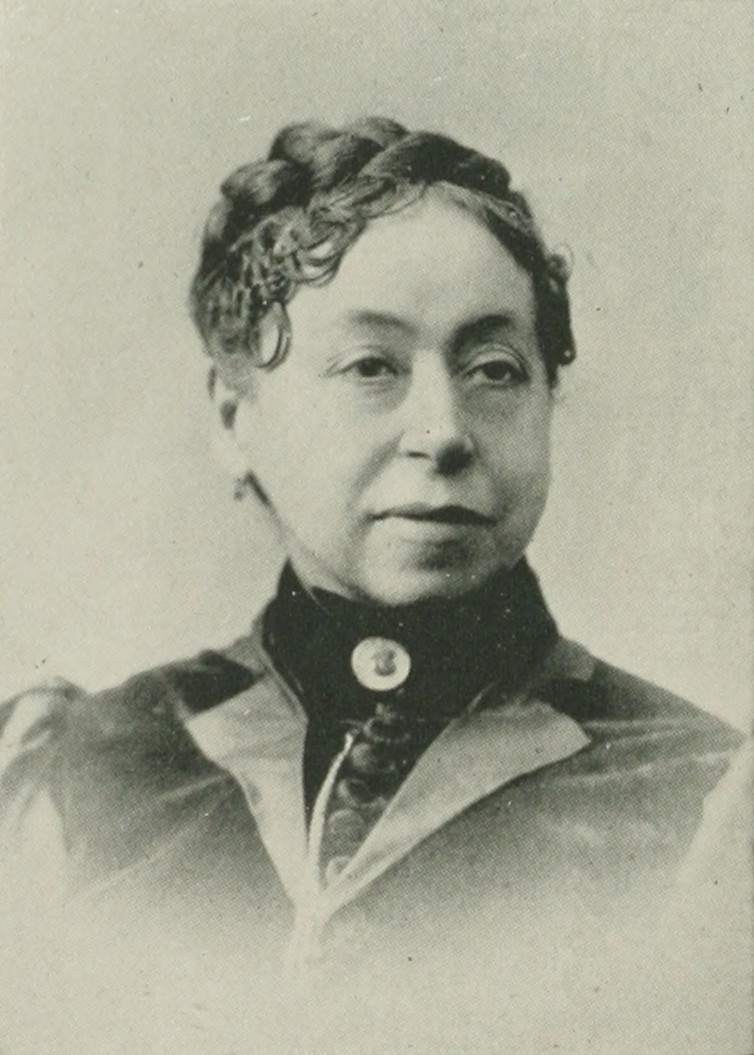
- "A Woman of the Century"
- Born: Mary Hannah Gray; Bristol, Rhode Island
- Died: Cambridge, Massachusetts
- Education: Miss Easterbrook's school for young ladies; East Greenwich Academy
- Occupations: author, correspondent, poet
- Partner: Dr. Augustus Peck Clarke
- Writing career
- Pen name: Nina Gray Clarke

Mary Hannah Gray Clarke (née, Gray; pen name Nina Gray Clarke; March 28, 1835 - May 30 or 31, 1892) was an American author, correspondent, and poet from Rhode Island. She wrote extensively for magazines and for the public press, and was also the author of many dramas, lyric poems, operettas, stories for the young, and essays. In addition to the operettas, "Just Like Cinderella" and "Jack Frost's Visit to the Fairies", her works included "Effle, Fairy Queen of Dolls," "Prince Pussin-Boots," "Golden Hair and her Knight of the Beanstalk in the Enchanted Forest," "Obed Owler and the Prize Writers," "How I Came to Leave Town and What Came of It," "Edith Morton, the Sensible Young Lady;" "The Story that the Willow Basket Told to Faith Fairchild;" "English Lyrics;" and "Home;" as well as a number of songs, such as "Were it not for Dreams;" "Twittering Swallow;" "Robin, Robin, Bold and Free;" "Down by the River;" "Not to Blame;" and "Our-Leafed Clover."

== Early life and education ==
Mary Hannah Gray was born in Bristol, Rhode Island, March 28, 1835. She was the daughter of Gideon Gray and Hannah Orne Metcalf Gray. She was a direct descendant of John Gray, an Englishman, and of his son, Edward Gray (born 1623, Stapleford Tawney, Essex, England) who emigrated in 1643 from Westminster, London, to Plymouth Colony, Massachusetts. Edward Gray was married to Dorothy Lettice and was known as the richest merchant of Plymouth. The oldest stone in the Plymouth cemetery is that of Edward Gray. Clarke's great-grandfather, Colonel Thomas Gray, of the fourth generation, served in the American Revolutionary War.

Clarke spent her early years on her father's homestead, a portion of the Mount Hope lands obtained from King Philip, the chief of the Wampanoag. A farm on those lands remained in Clarke's possession.

After attending schools in Bristol, including Miss Easterbrook's school for young ladies, she studied at East Greenwich Academy. Afterward, she went to Boston, where she devoted herself to the study of fine art, including painting, poetry and music.

== Career ==
On October 23, 1861, she married Dr. Augustus Peck Clarke. During her husband's four years of service as surgeon and surgeon-in-chief of brigade and of division of cavalry in the war, she took an active interest in work for the success of the Union cause. In the fall of 1865, Clarke and her husband moved to Cambridge, Massachusetts.

At an early age Clarke displayed a marked ability in the production of story and of verse. She wrote extensively for magazines and for the public press. She was also the author of many dramas, lyric poems and operettas, as well as stories for the young and essays. She assumed various pen names, but was chiefly known in print as "Nina Gray Clarke." The titles of some of her works included: "Effle, Fairy Queen of Dolls," for which she received the prize awarded by The Cambridge Tribune in 1880; "Prince Pussin-Boots," "Golden Hair and her Knight of the Beanstalk in the Enchanted Forest," "Obed Owler and the Prize Writers," "How I Came to Leave Town and What Came of It," "Edith Morton, the Sensible Young Lady;" "The Story that the Willow Basket Told to Faith Fairchild;" "English Lyrics;" and "Home." Clarke also composed a number of songs, such as "Were it not for Dreams;" "Just Like Cinderella" (an operetta); "Jack Frost's Visit to the Fairies" (an operetta); "Twittering Swallow;" "Robin, Robin, Bold and Free;" "Down by the River;" "Not to Blame;" and "Our-Leafed Clover."

== Personal life ==
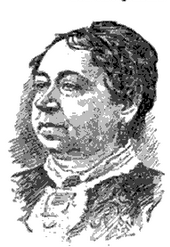
Mary H Gray Clarke

Clarke painted many pictures, some in watercolors and oils. Several of her paintings commanded attention from connoisseurs of art. In 1890, on the occasion of the meeting of the Tenth International Medical Congress in Germany, she accompanied her husband to Berlin. She traveled extensively, and accompanied her family on an extended tour through the British Isles and also through central and southern Europe, visiting all the capitals of those countries, for observation, study and for general self-improvement.

Her husband, Dr. Augustus Peck Clarke, was born in Pawtucket, Rhode Island, September 24, 1833. He graduated from Brown University (A.M., 1861) and Harvard Medical School (1862). He was a surgeon and brevet colonel, as well as professor of gynecology and abdominal surgery. He was affiliated with the College of Physicians and Surgeons, Boston (member, 1893–1901; dean, 1894–1901); founder and secretary of the Cambridge Society for Medical Improvement, 1870–75; vice-president, American Medical Association, 1895–96; chairman, section physiology, 1897; delegate, British Medical Association, 1890; president, Gynecological Society, Boston, 1891–92; founder and vice-president, PanAmerican Medical Congresses, Washington, D.C., 1893; Mexico City, 1896; Havana, Cuba. 1901; Panama, 1901. He was a member of the International Medical Congresses held in Washington, D.C., 1887; Berlin, 1890; Rome, 1894; Moscow, 1897 (honorary president, obstetrics and gynecology section in latter); Paris, 1900; Madrid, 1903; and Lisbon, 1906. He was the founder of the American Association Obstetricians and Gynecologists.

Through her marriage, Clarke had two daughters; Inez Louise and Genevieve Clarke, who were graduates of Radcliffe College and Tufts College Medical School. She made her residence at 825 Massachusetts Avenue, in Cambridge, near the City Hall, overlooking the Charles River valley.

Mary H. Gray Clarke died in Cambridge on May 30 (or 31), 1892.

== Selected works ==
- "Effie, Fairy Queen of Dolls," for which she received a prize from The Cambridge Tribune, 1880
- "Prince Puss in Boots"
- "Golden Hair and her Knight of the Beanstalk in the Enchanted Forest"
- "Obed Owler and the Prize Writers"
- "How I Came to Leave Town and What Came of it"
- "Edith Morton, the Sensible Young Lady"
