= Brendan O'Malley =

American actor

- Born: July 14, 1969 (age 55); Wakefield, Rhode Island, U.S.
- Education: University of Rhode Island (BA)
- Occupation: Actor
- Relatives: Mike O'Malley (cousin)

Brendan O'Malley (born July 14, 1969) is an American writer and actor from Kingston, Rhode Island.

== Early life and education ==
A graduate of South Kingstown High School, O'Malley attended the University of Rhode Island and studied English, theater, and French. His first cousin is comedian Mike O'Malley, who was also the creator of Survivor's Remorse (2014) for which Brendan O'Malley wrote several episodes.

== Career ==
Brendan O'Malley is a writer and actor, known as a writer for Survivor's Remorse (2014) as well as a reoccurring acting role in Burn Notice (2007) and Burn Notice: The Fall of Sam Axe (2011). O'Malley also had minor appearances in Law & Order.

== Filmography ==
=== Film ===
Year	Title	Role	Notes
2002	H.O.L.E.: The Disillusionment of Mike and Eva	Spank	
2003	Life in Bed	Elliott the Patheticist	
2011	Certainty	Chad	
2011	Color Me Obsessed	—	Documentary
2015	Hollywood Musical!	Acting Class	
2018	You & Me	Jarrett	

=== Television ===
Year	Title	Role	Notes
1997	Law & Order	CSU Technician	Episode: "Passion"
2002	Law & Order: SVU	Uniform Officer	Episode: "Justice"
2003	Law & Order: Criminal Intent	Evan Devlin	Episode: "Graansha"
2005	Yes, Dear	Joe	Episode: "High School Reunion"
2011	Burn Notice: The Fall of Sam Axe	Gabriel Manaro	Television film
2011, 2012	Burn Notice	Gabriel Manaro	2 episodes

== See also ==
- List of people from Rhode Island
