= East Greenwich Academy =

Boarding school

Coordinates: 41.6606°N 71.4509°W

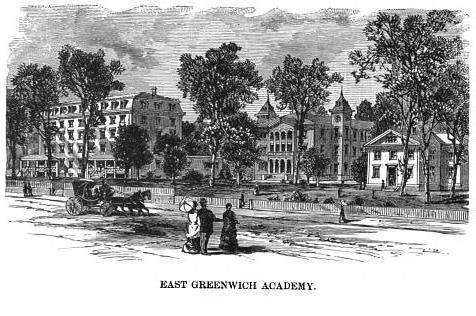
East Greenwich Academy, c.1890

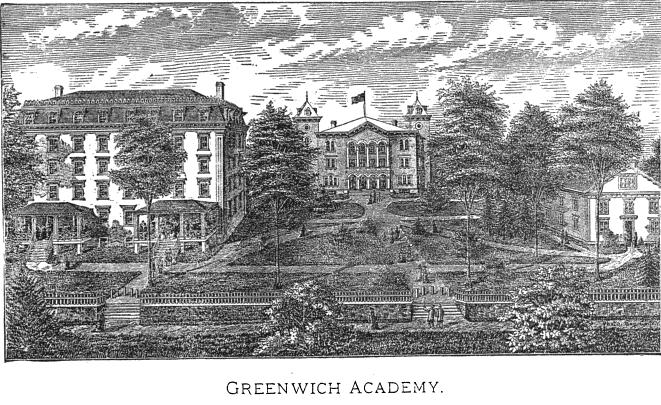
East Greenwich Academy, c. 1877

The East Greenwich Academy (originally known as Kent Academy) was a private Methodist boarding school in East Greenwich, Rhode Island, United States that operated from 1802 until 1943.

== History ==
The school was founded in 1802 by eight prominent men from East Greenwich and Warwick, who served as stockholders of the school. The campus was built on five acres of farmland belonging to Ethan Clark, which overlooked Narragansett Bay. In 1841 the Providence Conference Seminary of the Methodist Episcopal Church took over the school and by the mid-nineteenth century nearly three fourths of all Rhode Island teachers were alumni of the academy. After dwindling enrollment during the Great Depression and World War II, the academy closed in 1943. The town of East Greenwich purchased the buildings and used them as a school for several years until many of them were demolished in the 1960s. Around the same time, St. Luke's Episcopal Church purchased and demolished two of the other buildings. The headmaster's house with its ornate cupola still survives at 112 Peirce Street. The school's gymnasium, Swift Gymnasium, also survives and is used for local events and is the site of the "Academy Players," a theater group named after the old academy.

== Prominent alumni and faculty ==
- Nelson W. Aldrich, Republican U.S. Senator 1881-1911
- William Daniel Brayton, Republican U.S. Representative 1847-1861
- Marietta Stanley Case (1845–1900), poet and temperance advocate
- Mary H. Gray Clarke (born 1835), correspondent
- Isaac T. Goodnow, former professor of Natural Sciences at the Providence Conference Seminary (a.k.a. East Greenwich Academy) 1848-1854, co-founded the town of Manhattan, Kansas and the school that became known as Kansas State University.
- Albert C. Greene (1792–1863), U.S. Senator from Rhode Island
- George Washington Greene, professor at Brown University, historian
- Benjamin Knight (1836–1905), physician, U.S. Senator from California
- Charles Phelps, first Connecticut attorney general (1899–1903)
- Harry A. Richardson, U.S. Senator from Delaware (1907–1913)
- Raymond S. Thatcher (1903–1988), Connecticut State Comptroller
