= List of Bryant University alumni =

Coordinates: 41.92545°N 71.53241°W

This is a list of notable alumni and current students of Bryant University.

== Business ==
- Otto Frederick Hunziker – dairy industry pioneer

== Politics ==
- Jeanine Calkin – state senator from the 30th district
- Frank Ciccone – chair of the Rhode Island Senate Committee on Housing and Municipal Government and state senator from the 7th District
- Douglas H. Fisher – New Jersey secretary of agriculture
- Antonio Giarrusso – senior deputy minority leader of the Rhode Island House of Representatives and state representative from the 30th district
- Kenneth Marshall – senior deputy majority leader of the Rhode Island House of Representatives and state representative from the 68th district
- Harold Metts – president pro tempore of the Rhode Island Senate and state senator from the 6th district
- Dominick J. Ruggerio – president of the Rhode Island Senate and state senator from the 4th district
- Scott A. Slater – deputy majority leader of the Rhode Island House of Representatives and state representative from the 10th district

== Arts and entertainment ==
- Nicholas Colasanto – actor, known for his roles in Cheers, Starsky & Hutch, and Chips
- Jose B. Gonzalez - Connecticut Poet Laureate, 2026-Present
- Mikayla Nogueira – social media influencer and makeup artist

== Sports ==
- Ben Altit – Israeli basketball player for Hapoel Be'er Sheva of the Israeli Premier League
- Doug Edert – former Bulldogs basketball player most notable as a breakout star of Saint Peter's 2022 NCAA tournament run
- Zack Greer – Major League Lacrosse player for the Long Island Lizards; National Lacrosse League player for the Minnesota Swarm
- James Karinchak – pitcher for the Cleveland Guardians
- Tom Kennedy - NFL wide receiver, Detroit Lions
- Natalia Kuipers – U.S. Virgin Islands Olympic swimmer
- Benjamin Schulte – Guamanian swimmer
- Annmarie Tuxbury – distance runner
- Ryan Ward – outfielder for the Los Angeles Dodgers
- Mickey Gasper - major League baseball player for the Boston Red Sox

== Military ==
- Andy Mamedoff – fighter pilot in the Battle of Britain
