= The Cambridge Tribune =

American newspaper

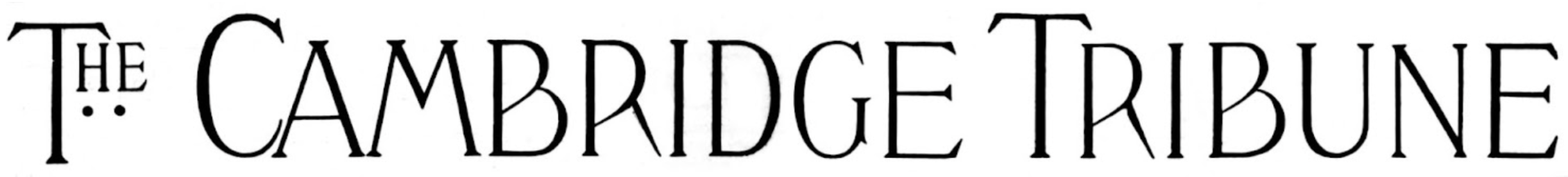
- Type: Weekly newspaper
- Owner: William Bailey Howland
- Founder: D. Gilbert Dexter
- Founded: 1878
- Ceased publication: 1966
- Headquarters: Brattle Square, Old Cambridge Historic District
- City: Cambridge, Massachusetts
- Country: United States

The Cambridge Tribune was a weekly newspaper published in Cambridge, Massachusetts from 1878 to 1966. It was founded by D. Gilbert Dexter and began publication on March 7, 1878, from offices at Brattle Square in Old Cambridge. In 1885 Dexter sold the paper to William Bailey Howland. It ceased publication in 1966.
