= List of people from Cranston, Rhode Island =

The following list includes notable people who were born or have lived in Cranston, Rhode Island.

== Arts and culture ==
- Stevie Aiello, musician, touring with Thirty Seconds to Mars, born and raised in Cranston
- Sasha Cagen, writer, editor, and entrepreneur; creator of the Quirkyalone movement; native of Cranston
- Olivia Culpo, Miss Rhode Island USA 2012, Miss USA 2012, Miss Universe 2012
- Joyce Jillson, syndicated newspaper columnist, best-selling author, actress, and astrologer; born in Cranston
- JVKE, musician, singer-songwriter, producer, and social media personality, born in Providence and raised in Cranston
- Steven Klein, fashion photographer and music video director; born in Cranston
- George Masso, jazz trombonist, bandleader, vibraphonist and composer; born in Cranston
- Domenic Thomas Russillo, architect; lived and died in Cranston
- Mike Stud, rapper, former duke baseball player; retired after Tommy John surgery
- Frederick Lewis Weis, reverend and author; born in Cranston

=== TV and film ===
- Robert Aldrich, film director, writer, and producer (The Flight of the Phoenix, The Dirty Dozen, The Longest Yard); born in Cranston
- Vin Di Bona, TV producer (MacGyver, Entertainment Tonight, America's Funniest Home Videos); native of Cranston
- Jessica Graf, 2017 Big Brother contestant and 2018 The Amazing Race contestant; born in Cranston
- Elisabeth Hasselbeck, co-host of The View and 2001 Survivor contestant; born in Cranston
- Sam Hyde, comedian, writer, performance artist and actor; lives in Cranston
- Logan Marshall-Green, actor (Dark Blue, The O.C., 24, Traveler); grew up in Cranston
- Dennis Wholey, TV host and New York Times bestselling author; born in Cranston

== Business ==
- Benjamin Knight, textile manufacturer; co-founder of Fruit of the Loom; lived in Cranston
- Robert Knight, textile manufacturer; co-founder of Fruit of the Loom; lived in Cranston
- Abraham Nathanson (1929–2010), graphic designer; developed the game Bananagrams; lived in Cranston
- Carolyn Rafaelian, founder of Alex and Ani; lived in Cranston and started her company there

== Law and crime ==
- Jessica Ahlquist, plaintiff in a lawsuit to remove a religious prayer from Cranston High School West
- Haiganush R. Bedrosian, first female chief justice of the Rhode Island Family Court; grew up in Cranston
- Edward William Day, U.S. federal judge for the District of Rhode Island; born in Cranston
- John Gordon, last person executed in Rhode Island (1845); posthumously pardoned in 2011; lived in Cranston
- Matthew Guglielmetti, mobster; lived in Cranston
- Nicholas O'Neill, youngest of the 100 victims of The Station nightclub fire; lived in Cranston
- Ojetta Rogeriee Thompson, U.S. appellate court judge and Rhode Island Superior Court justice; lived in Cranston

== Military ==
- Christopher Lippitt, brigadier general in the Continental Army; textile mill owner; lived in Cranston
- George J. Peters, U.S. Army soldier; Medal of Honor recipient in World War II; born in Cranston
- Elisha Hunt Rhodes, general in the Union Army; his war diary was quoted in The Civil War series on PBS

== Politics ==
- Buddy Cianci, 32nd and 34th mayor of Providence, Rhode Island; born in Cranston
- Richard T. Cooney, New Hampshire state legislator
- Edward D. DiPrete, 70th governor of Rhode Island; mayor of Cranston (1978–1985)
- Elisha Harris, 20th governor of Rhode Island; born in Cranston
- Henry Howard, 32nd governor of Rhode Island; born in Cranston
- Nehemiah Knight, U.S. congressman; born in Cranston
- Nehemiah R. Knight, U.S. senator; 9th governor of Rhode Island; born in Cranston
- Sergei Khrushchev, son of former Soviet Premier Nikita Khrushchev
- Steve Laffey, mayor of Cranston (2003–2007)
- Charlene Lima, Rhode Island state representative; lived in Cranston
- Henry Curtis Lind, 14th reporter of decisions of the US Supreme Court; born in Cranston
- Seth Magaziner, U.S. congressman, 31st General Treasurer of Rhode Island
- Nicholas Mattiello, Rhode Island state representative; lived in Cranston
- David Moretti, actor (Dante's Cove, The Lair); born in Cranston
- Michael Napolitano, mayor of Cranston (2007–2009)
- John O. Pastore, 61st governor of Rhode Island and United States senator; lived in Cranston
- Jack Reed, U.S. senator and congressman representing Rhode Island's 2nd congressional district; born in Cranston
- Elizabeth H. Roberts, 68th lieutenant governor of Rhode Island; lives in Cranston
- William Sprague (1799–1856); U.S. senator and industrialist; born in Cranston
- William Sprague (1830–1915); U.S. senator and the 27th governor of Rhode Island; born in Cranston

== Religion ==
- Jeffrey Mello, Episcopal priest (bishop of Connecticut)

== Science and academia ==
- Dorothy Bliss (1916–1987), crustacean researcher and curator at the American Museum of Natural History; born in Cranston
- Deborah Carr (1966– ), sociologist and professor at Boston University; raised in Cranston

== Sports ==
=== Baseball ===
- Jimmy Cooney, shortstop in the 1890s for the Chicago Colts and Washington Senators; born in Cranston
- Jimmy Cooney, shortstop in the 1920s with six Major League Baseball teams; born in Cranston
- Johnny Cooney, outfielder for five Major League Baseball teams and manager for the Boston Braves; born in Cranston
- Hugh Duffy, outfielder for five Major League Baseball teams and manager with four teams; born in Cranston
- Tom Healey, pitcher for the Providence Grays and Indianapolis Blues; born in Cranston
- Thomas Pannone, pitcher for the Toronto Blue Jays; born and raised in Cranston, Rhode Island
- Joe Trimble, pitcher for the Boston Red Sox and Pittsburgh Pirates

=== Boxing ===
- Melissa Fiorentino, super featherweight female boxer; born in Cranston
- Vinny Paz, world champion lightweight and light middleweight boxer; born in Cranston

=== Football ===
- Deon Anderson, fullback for the Dallas Cowboys and Miami Dolphins
- Will Blackmon, defensive back for the Green Bay Packers and New York Giants; Super Bowl champion (XLVI); born in Providence, grew up in Cranston
- A. J. Smith, former executive for the Washington Redskins and San Diego Chargers; football coach at Cranston High School West
- Amber van Eeghen, cheerleader for the New England Patriots; daughter of Mark van Eeghen; alum of Cranston High School West
- Mark van Eeghen, Pro Bowl running back for the Los Angeles Raiders and New England Patriots; all-state football player at Cranston High School West

=== Hockey ===
- Curt Bennett, former National Hockey League all star for the Atlanta Flames in 1975 and 1976; grew up in Cranston
- John Bennett, former World Hockey Association player for the Philadelphia Blazers
- Harvey Bennett, Jr., Curt's younger brother, center for five National Hockey League teams; born in Cranston
- Jack Capuano, defenseman for the Toronto Maple Leafs, Vancouver Canucks, and Boston Bruins; head coach of New York Islanders; born in Cranston
- Joe Cavanagh, lawyer and Hall of Fame forward on the 1972 US Olympic hockey team (broke his wrist in training); grew up in Cranston
- David Emma, right wing for the New Jersey Devils, Boston Bruins, and Florida Panthers; born in Cranston
- Joe Exter, goaltender for the (ECHL) Wheeling Nailers; born in Cranston
- Rob Gaudreau, right wing for the San Jose Sharks and Ottawa Senators; born in Cranston
- David Littman, goaltender for the Buffalo Sabres and Tampa Bay Lightning; born in Cranston
- Tom Mellor, defenseman for the Detroit Red Wings and silver medalist 1972 US Olympic hockey team; born in Cranston
- David Quinn, defenseman for the Binghamton Rangers (AHL), Cleveland Lumberjacks (IHL), and head coach of the Lake Erie Monsters (AHL), head coach of the New York Rangers, NHL; born in Cranston
- Tim Regan, goaltender for the Hershey Bears and Cincinnati Swords of the AHL; lived in Cranston
- Ralph Warburton, right wing for the Worcester Warriors, Milwaukee Clarks, and Boston Olympics of the Eastern Hockey League; born in Cranston

=== Ice skating ===
- Marissa Castelli, three time junior bronze medalist in novice pairs (U.S. twice, World once), two time national champion with Simon Shnapir in pairs (U.S.), bronze medalist in team figure skating at 2014 Olympics; lived in Cranston

=== Soccer ===
- Sam Fletcher, full back and manager for several professional soccer teams; lived and died in Cranston
- Michael Parkhurst, defender for the New England Revolution and US men's national team; MLS Rookie of the year (2005)
- Damian Rivera, midfielder

=== Sports media ===
- Steven Krasner, sportswriter for The Providence Journal; children's book author; grew up in Cranston
