= Martha Mitchell (author) =

American librarian and archivist

Martha Mitchell (died December 14, 2011) was an American librarian and archivist. She was the longtime archivist at Brown University and author of Encyclopedia Brunoniana, a reference work on Brown's history.

A native of Seekonk, Massachusetts, she attended Tufts University and earned a degree in library science from McGill University. She began working at Brown as a librarian in 1949 and led the archives from the 1960s until her retirement in 2003.

She became known as the university's "unofficial historian" and "trivia whiz," with an "encyclopedic mind [that] was filled with all things Brown."
