= Susan Hammond Barney =

American evangelist (1834-1922)

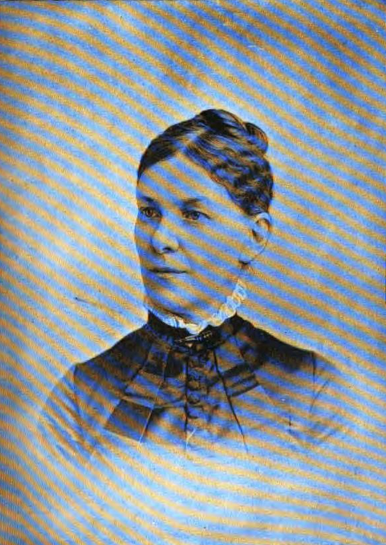
- Portrait photo from The Temperance Movement, 1887

Personal life
- Born: Susan Hunt Hammond; November 24, 1834 Pawtucket, Rhode Island, U.S.
- Died: April 29, 1922 (aged 87) Providence, Rhode Island
- Spouse: Joseph K. Barney (m. 1854)
- Children: 2
- Known for: WCTU's National Superintendent of Prison, Jail, Police, and Almshouse Visitation

Religious life
- Religion: Christianity
- Denomination: Methodist Episcopal Church
- Institute: Woman's Foreign Missionary Society of the Methodist Episcopal Church; Woman's Christian Temperance Union
- Profession: evangelist, writer

Susan Hammond Barney (née, Hammond; November 24, 1834 – April 29, 1922) was an American social activist and evangelist. She was the founder of the Prisoners' Aid Society of Rhode Island, and due to her efforts, police matrons were secured for the station houses of large cities. She worked with the Woman's Foreign Missionary Society, and was the first president of the Rhode Island Woman's Christian Temperance Union (WCTU). She was instrumental in making prohibition a constitutional enactment in Rhode Island in 1886. Barney is best remembered as the WCTU's National Superintendent of Prison, Jail, Police, and Almshouse Visitation. Her wide sympathies and ministries earned her the title of "The Prisoner's Friend." It was Barney's desire to become a foreign Christian missionary, but, due to ill-health, she was not able to pursue this career; nonetheless, her first public speaking was done in the interest of the Woman's Foreign Missionary Society of the Methodist Episcopal Church.

== Early life ==
Susan Hunt Hammond was born November 24, 1834, in Pawtucket, Rhode Island, the daughter of Dr. John Allen and Elisa (Brown) Hammond. Her father, Dr. Hammond, was a prominent physician. She was a contributor to the local press at the age of thirteen.

== Career ==
It was her desire to become a foreign Christian missionary, but, owing to ill-health and the strong opposition of friends, she reluctantly did not pursue this career. Her first public speaking was done in the interest of the Woman's Foreign Missionary Society of the Methodist Episcopal Church. She was one of the founders of the Prisoners' Aid Society of Rhode Island, and was always interested in prison and jail work. She was the first president of the Rhode Island WCTU, a position she held for several years. She went on to become a national evangelist. The enactment of constitutional prohibition in Rhode Island in 1886 was largely due to her executive ability. She had much to do with securing police matrons for the station-houses of large cities, and was an able platform speaker. Barney's sermons received high commendation by pastors, and her services were sought by nearly all denominations. She contributed a chapter on the "Care of the Criminal" to Woman's Work in America (New York City, 1891).

=== Tour of the South Pacific for World WCTU ===
In 1897, she set off on a tour of the South Pacific as the World WCTU's Superintendent for Prison, Police, Charitable and Reformatory Work. She gave ten addresses in eight days in Honolulu, then traveled to Auckland where she was hosted by Annie Schnackenberg, president of the Women's Christian Temperance Union New Zealand. She spent two weeks touring the various prisons and asylums while giving lectures on prison reform. She then traveled to Christchurch where Kate Sheppard introduced her in a public meeting to welcome her. She spent two weeks there before moving on to Dunedin, and then to Australia - first in Sydney.

== Personal life ==
She married Joseph K. Barney, of Providence, Rhode Island, in 1854, and thereafter resided in that city, with the exception of several years spent on the Pacific Coast. They had two children: Walter Hammond (born 1855) and Charles Alfred (born 1858).

Susan Hammond Barney died April 29, 1922, at Providence.
