= Irving R. Levine =

American journalist (1922–2009)

Irving Raskin Levine (August 26, 1922 – March 27, 2009) was an American journalist and longtime correspondent for NBC News. During his 45-year career, Levine reported from more than two dozen countries. He was the first American television correspondent to be accredited in the Soviet Union. He wrote three non-fiction books on life in the USSR, each of which became a bestseller.

== Early life and education ==
Born in Pawtucket, Rhode Island, Levine graduated from Brown University.

== Career ==
In 1940 Levine went into journalism, starting at the Providence Journal as an obituary writer. During World War II, he served with the Army Signal Corps.

After completing graduate school at the Columbia University School of Journalism, Levine started working for the International News Service. He covered the outbreak of war in Korea in 1950 and began freelancing for NBC News. He joined them in 1950 as a correspondent. During his career, he reported from more than two dozen countries. These included the USSR, where in 1955, he became the first American television correspondent to receive accreditation. He had accompanied some American farming experts there, and stayed for four years to report on the country. He later recounted that during 1955, he was approached to be a Soviet spy but he refused and, despite threats and being followed, managed to continue reporting.

He was named bureau chief of Rome, where he served for nearly 12 years, also being stationed in Vienna and Tokyo. His reporting on Europe included accounts of the 1961 construction of the Berlin Wall by East Germany; the Vatican II Ecumenical Council, which opened in 1962; and the 1968 invasion of Czechoslovakia by the USSR. While Rome correspondent, he also reported on the reaction in Italy to the assassination of John F. Kennedy on 22 November 1963.

Upon returning to the U.S. in 1971, Levine became the chief economics correspondent for NBC and reported from Washington, DC. He was the first full-time economics reporter for the network. TIME magazine described him as a "pioneer" in economics reporting on television.

As a national correspondent, Levine became known for his distinctive sign-off, slightly stressing his middle initial. He wore bow ties when reporting on screen. Famed for his impeccable grammar and diction, Levine made a crossover to entertainment, with a self-mocking appearance on Saturday Night Live. He also played on his national reputation by appearing on the series Murphy Brown. Levine was interviewed by David Letterman and Jay Leno on their respective shows. When asked what he would miss most moving from NBC to CBS late night, Letterman answered, "backrubs from Irving R. Levine." His final interview prior to retirement was with Tom Brokaw.

After retiring in 1995 from NBC, Levine became dean of Lynn University's School of International Communication in Boca Raton, Florida. He retired from there in 2004.

== Marriage, family and death ==
In 1957 Levine married Nancy Cartmell Jones, who had been working on the Dave Garroway Show. They had three children: Daniel, Jeffrey C. B. and Jennifer J. Levine.

Levine died in Washington, DC on March 27, 2009. He was 86. The cause was complications of prostate cancer, said his son Daniel Rome Levine.

== Works ==
- Main Street, U.S.S.R. (1959), named one of the New York Times "Top 100 Books of the Year"

== Other ==
Ving Rhames was named Irving after Levine.
