= List of Sigma Xi members =

This is a list of notable members of the science and engineering honor society Sigma Xi.

== Academia ==
- Larry L. Hench, emeritus professor at the University of Florida and chair of the Ceramic Materials Department at Imperial College London; inventor of Bioglass 45S5
- Jeremy Howick – Canadian-British interdisciplinary researcher and founding director of the Stoneygate Centre for Excellence in Empathic Healthcare
- Lois Lampe – botanist and educator; professor emerita, the Ohio State University
- Herbert E. Longenecker – president of Tulane University
- Henry P. Rusk – dean of the department of agriculture, University of Illinois
- Fatima Cody Stanford – obesity-medicine physician–scientist at Massachusetts General Hospital and associate professor of Medicine and Pediatrics at Harvard Medical School
- Ray T. Stull – professor and head of ceramic engineering at the University of Illinois, chief of the heavy clay section of the United States Bureau of Standards, chief ceramist of the United States Bureau of Mines, and superintendent of its Ceramic Experiment Station at Ohio State University
- Eduardo Suger – Swiss-Guatemalan educator and founder of Galileo University
- Blake R. Van Leer – United States Army officer and president of Georgia Institute of Technology
- Jeffrey Vitter – computer scientist and 17th chancellor of the University of Mississippi

== Aerospace ==
- Gene Cernan – astronaut; commander of the Apollo 17 Moon landing and the last man to walk on the Moon
- Irmgard Flügge-Lotz – developed the theory of discontinuous automatic control; first female engineering professor at Stanford University and first female engineer elected a fellow of the American Institute of Aeronautics and Astronautics
- Jack Parsons – rocket engineer, rocket propulsion researcher, chemist, and a leading member of the OTO occult group

== Anthropology ==
- Eugenie Scott – leading critic of young Earth creationism and intelligent design

== Biology ==
=== Botany ===
- Don G. Despain – flora of Yellowstone National Park specialist
- Edwin Earle Honey (1891–1956) – plant pathologist and mycologist
- Hu Hsen-Hsu (1894–1968) – founder of plant taxonomy in China
- Barbara McClintock – cytogenetics specialist, Nobel Prize in Physiology or Medicine winner
- Peter H. Raven – president emeritus of the Missouri Botanical Garden
- Julia Warner Snow – systematic phycologist and instructor

=== Entomology ===
- Anna Botsford Comstock – insect illustrator, leader in the nature study movement, and one of the first four female members of Sigma Xi
- Marion Durbin Ellis – ichthyologist and entomologist

=== Molecular biology ===
- Francis Crick – co-discoverer of the structure of the DNA molecule, Nobel Prize in Physiology or Medicine winner
- Jennifer Doudna – pioneer in CRISPR gene editing, Nobel Prize in Chemistry winner
- James D. Watson – co-discoverer of the structure of DNA, Nobel Prize in Physiology or Medicine winner

=== Zoology ===
- Roger Arliner Young – first African American woman to receive a PhD in zoology
- William Rees Brebner Robertson – zoologist and early cytogeneticist who discovered the chromosomal rearrangement named in his honour, Robertsonian translocation
- Florence Wells Slater – entomologist

== Chemistry ==
- Arthur W. Adamson – inorganic photochemistry pioneer
- Arthur A. Noyes – chemist and inventor
- Bettye Washington Greene – Dow Chemical
- Narayan Sadashiv Hosmane – Humboldt Prize winner
- Ray R. Irani – current chairman and former chief executive officer of Occidental Petroleum
- Irving Langmuir – research helped develop the incandescent light bulb, Nobel Prize in Chemistry winner
- Tobin J. Marks – National Medal of Science laureate
- Hazel E. Munsell – Kappa chapter; chemist and nutrition researcher
- Donna Nelson – president of Oklahoma Sigma Xi chapter, American Chemical Society (ACS) president (2016), Breaking Bad science advisor (2008–2013)
- Linus Pauling – Nobel Prize in Chemistry winner
- Harry Snyder – president of Minnesota Sigma Xi chapter
- Theodor Svedberg – Nobel Prize in Chemistry winner
- Harold Urey – discovery of deuterium, Nobel Prize in Chemistry winner

== Computer science ==
- Alan Sherman – Cryptologia editor
- Michael Waterman – computational biology specialist

== Economics ==
- Kenneth Arrow – Nobel Prize in Economics winner
- Herbert A. Simon – political scientist, Nobel Prize in Economics winner
- John Forbes Nash Jr. mathematician, Nobel Prize in Economics winner
- Robert C. Merton – Nobel Prize in Economics winner
- Myron S. Scholes – Nobel Prize in Economics winner
- Daniel Kahneman – psychologist, Nobel Prize in Economics winner
- Lloyd S. Shapley – mathematician, Nobel Prize in Economics winner
- William D. Nordhaus – Nobel Prize in Economics winner

== Engineering ==
=== Chemical engineering ===
- Frances Arnold – Nobel Prize in Chemistry winner for directed evolution

=== Electrical engineering ===
- Supriyo Datta – director of NASA Institute for Nanoelectronics and Computing
- Gordon T. Gould – US Air Force lieutenant general
- Alan V. Oppenheim – developed the field of digital signal processing and member of the National Academy of Engineering
- Mabel MacFerran Rockwell – only woman involved in designing and installing the power generating machinery for Hoover Dam

=== Mechanical engineering ===
- Catherine Mohr – surgical roboticist and faculty of Stanford School of Medicine

== Materials science ==
- Katherine T. Faber – world expert in ceramics and originator of the Faber-Evans model for crack deflection
- John B. Goodenough – developer of the lithium-ion battery and winner of the Nobel Prize in Chemistry
- Galen D. Stucky – expert in mesoporous materials
- Sharat Kumar Roy – geologist, expert on fossils

== Mathematics and statistics ==
- Albert Turner Bharucha-Reid – probability and Markov chain theorist
- Bruce A. Craig – statistician and academic
- George P. McCabe – statistician
- James McMahon – delegate to First Convention of Sigma Xi
- John J. Deely – statistician and educator
- John von Neumann – Enrico Fermi Award winner
- Herman Rubin – statistician
- Cornelia Strong – professor of mathematics and astronomy

== Physics ==
- John C. Cook – played a crucial role in establishing the field of ground-penetrating radar
- Richard J. Duffin – mathematical physicist noted for contributions to electrical transmission theory and geometric programming
- Albert Einstein – developed the general theory of relativity, Nobel Prize in Physics winner
- Richard Feynman – Nobel Prize in Physics winner
- Enrico Fermi – Chicago Pile team member, Nobel Prize in Physics winner
- Andrea Ghez – astrophysicist, Nobel Prize in Physics winner
- Mustapha Ishak Boushaki – gravitational lensing and universe expansion physicist, University of Texas at Dallas
- Walter E. Massey – physicist and president of Morehouse College 1995–2007
- Ernest Merritt – dean of the Graduate School, Cornell University
- Robert A. Millikan – Nobel Prize in Physics winner, president of Caltech
- Rahul Pandit – condensed matter physicist, Shanti Swarup Bhatnagar laureate
- Andrea Prosperetti – multiphase flow researcher
- Natalia Zotov – cosmologist specializing in gravity waves at Louisiana Tech

== Psychology ==
- Marie Skodak Crissey – developmental psychologist, served as president of two divisions of the American Psychological Association
- Steven Rasmussen – psychiatrist, chair of the Department of Psychiatry and Human Behavior at Brown University

== Honorary members ==
- Natalie Angier – journalist
- Deborah Blum – Pulitzer Prize-winning journalist
- Sherwood Boehlert – member of the United States House of Representatives
- George Brown, Jr. – member of the United States House of Representatives
- Malcolm Browne – photojournalist
- Clinton Sumner Burns – civil engineer
- William D. Carey – publisher of Science
- Barbara Culliton – science journalist and editor
- Claudia Dreifus – journalist
- Dennis Flanagan – founding editor of Scientific American
- Ira Flatow – Science Friday host
- Al Gore – vice president of the United States, Nobel Peace Prize winner
- Sidney Harris – cartoonist
- Brian Hayes – science writer
- Theodore Hesburgh – president emeritus of the University of Notre Dame
- Jamie Hyneman – MythBusters co-host
- Bill Kurtis – television journalist
- Bob McDonald – journalist
- Dennis Overbye – science writer
- David Price – member of the United States House of Representatives
- David Quammen – science writer
- Paul Raeburn – science writer
- Floyd M. Riddick – Parliamentarian of the United States Senate
- Adam Savage – MythBusters co-host
- David Sington – BBC journalist
- Walter S. Sullivan – New York Times journalist
- Stewart Udall – secretary of the interior during John F. Kennedy and Lyndon B. Johnson administrations
