= Paul Chien =

Chinese-American biologist

Paul Kwan Chien
- Born: 1 January 1947 (age 79); Hong Kong
- Education: Chinese University of Hong Kong (BS); University of California, Irvine (PhD)
- Known for: invertebrate physiology and toxicology, support for intelligent design
- Scientific career
- Fields: Comparative physiology
- Workplaces: University of San Francisco
- Thesis: Studies on the ultrastructures and physiology of certain invertebrates (1971)
- Doctoral advisor: Grover C. Stephens
- Other academic advisors: Wheeler J. North

Paul Kwan Chien (Chinese: 钱锟; pinyin: Qián Kūn; Jyutping: Cin4 Kwan1, born 1 January 1947) is a Hong Kong-American biologist known for his research on the physiology and ecology of intertidal organisms and his support for intelligent design.

== Biography ==
Chien was born on 1 January 1947 in Hong Kong and earned bachelor's degrees in Biology and Chemistry from Chung Chi College of the Chinese University of Hong Kong in 1966 and his Ph.D. in 1971 from the University of California at Irvine in the laboratory of marine invertebrate physiologist Grover C. Stephens. After a brief postdoctoral fellowship in the laboratory of Wheeler J. North at the Kerckhoff marine laboratory of the California Institute of Technology in Corona del Mar, California, he joined the faculty of the University of San Francisco in 1973. His research has involved the transport of amino acids and metal ions across cell membranes as well as the detoxification mechanisms of metal ions.

== Intelligent design ==
Chien is a fellow of the Discovery Institute's Center for Science and Culture, hub of the intelligent design movement. Chien is described in the Discovery Institute's Wedge document as leading its "Paleontology Research program", in spite of the fact that, by his own admission, he has no credentials in the field. He has translated several books by intelligent design authors, such as Phillip Johnson's book Darwin on Trial and Jonathan Wells' Icons of Evolution, into Chinese.

== Selected publications ==
- Chien, Paul K., Su Xiu-Ronga, Lv Zhen-Minga, Li Tai-Wua, Liu Zhi-Ming. 2007. "Analysis of isozymes related to energy metabolism of adult Tegillarca granosa." Chinese Journal of Agricultural Biotechnology 4: 163-166, Cambridge University Press.
- Chien, Paul, Stephen C. Meyer, Paul Nelson, and Marcus R. Ross. 2004. "The Cambrian Explosion: Biology's Big Bang." In Darwinism, Design and Public Education (Michigan State University Press), pp. 323–402. ISBN 0-87013-675-5
- Chien, P. K., X. C. Gan, J. Wang, and C. Q. Duan. 1998. "Relocation of civilization centers in ancient China: environmental factors." Ambio (Royal Swedish Academy of Sciences), 27:572-575.
- Chien, P. K., Y. Chien, and A. Furst. 1993. "Worms as a Substitute for Rodents in Toxicology: Acute Toxicity of Three Nickel Compounds." Toxicology Mechanisms and Methods, Volume 3, Issue 1 March 1993, pages 19 – 23.
- Lin, W., M.A. Rice, and P.K. Chien. 1992. The effects of copper, cadmium, and zinc on particle filtration and uptake of glycine in the pacific oyster, Crassostrea gigas. Comparative Biochemistry and Physiology 103C:181-187.
- Chien, P.K. and M.A. Rice. 1985. Autoradiographic localization of exogenously supplied amino acids after uptake by the polychaete, Glycera dibranchiata Ehlers. Wasmann Journal of Biology 43:60-71.
- Rice, M.A. and P.K. Chien. 1979. Uptake, binding and clearance of divalent cadmium in Glycera dibranchiata (Annelida:Polychaeta). Marine Biology 53:33-39.
- Chien, P.K., G.C. Stephens, and P.L. Healey, 1972. The role of ultrastructure and physiological differentiation of epithelia in amino acid uptake by the bloodworm, Glycera. Biolological Bulletin 142:219-235.
- Chien, P. K., P.T. Johnson, N.D. Holland and F.A. Chapman. 1970. "The coelomic elements of sea urchins (Strongylocentrotus)." Protoplasma Journal, Volume 71, Number 4 / December, 1970.
