= Peter Sterling (neuroscientist) =

American anatomist, physiologist, and neuroscientist

- Born: June 28, 1940 (age 86); New York City, New York, U.S.
- Education: New York University Medical School, Cornell University, Western Reserve University (Ph.D.)
- Known for: allostasis
- Awards: Proctor Medal (2012), American Publishers Award for Professional and Scholarly Excellence (PROSE Award) in Biological & Life Sciences (2016)
- Scientific career
- Fields: neuroscience, biological psychiatry, endocrinology
- Workplaces: University of Pennsylvania
- Doctoral advisor: Hans Kuypers
- Other academic advisors: Howard Allen Schneiderman, David H. Hubel, Torsten Wiesel
- Doctoral students: Gillian Einstein
- Other notable students: Peter Strick
- Website: https://www.med.upenn.edu/apps/faculty/index.php/g275/p7333

Peter Sterling (born June 28, 1940) is an American anatomist, physiologist and neuroscientist and Professor of Neuroscience at the University of Pennsylvania School of Medicine. He is the author of What Is Health? Allostasis and the Evolution of Human Design (2020), and with Simon Laughlin, is an author of Principles of Neural Design.

== Early life ==
Peter Sterling was born in 1940 in New York city to Phillip and Dorothy Sterling, writers and advocates for progressive causes. His sister is the noted researcher and professor Anne Fausto-Sterling. At the age of twenty, while a student at Cornell University in Ithaca, New York, he was arrested in Jackson, Mississippi for participating in a Freedom Ride. He was set free after paying a fine and/or by mediation by Howard Allen Schneiderman, who recruited him to experimental biology.

== Career ==
Peter Sterling attended New York University Medical School for two years, but voluntarily dropped out in order to study neuroanatomy. He received his PhD from Western Reserve University, where he worked on the anatomical organisation of the spinal cord.

Later he provided significant contributions to the knowledge about three-dimensional retinal microanatomy.

In 1980 he was appointed professor of neuroscience at the Department of Neuroscience at the University of Pennsylvania in Philadelphia.

Together with Joseph Eyer, Peter Sterling coined the term allostasis for "stability through change", which is now enjoying growing scientific attention, especially in the context of allostatic load.

== Selected works ==
1. Stevens JK, Davis TL, Friedman N, Sterling P. A systematic approach to reconstructing microcircuitry by electron microscopy of serial sections. Brain Res. 1980 Dec;2(3):265-93. PMID 6258704.
2. Sterling P, Eyer J. Biological basis of stress-related mortality. Soc Sci Med E. 1981 Feb;15(1):3-42. PMID 7020084.
3. Sterling P. Deciphering the retina's wiring diagram. Nat Neurosci. 1999 Oct;2(10):851-3. PMID 10491597.
4. Sterling P. Principles of Allostasis: Optimal Design, Predictive Regulation, Pathophysiology, and Rational Therapeutics. In: Schulkin J. Allostasis, Homeostasis, and the Costs of Physiological Adaptation. Cambridge University Press, Cambridge, New York 2004. ISBN 0521811414
5. Sterling P. Allostasis: a model of predictive regulation. Physiol Behav. 2012 Apr 12;106(1):5-15. doi: 10.1016/j.physbeh.2011.06.004. Epub 2011 Jun 12. PMID 21684297.
6. Sterling P, Laughlin S. Principles of Neural Design. MIT Press 2015. ISBN 9780262028707
7. Sterling P. Predictive regulation and human design. Elife. 2018 Jun 29;7. pii: e36133. doi: 10.7554/eLife.36133. PMID 29957178
8. Schulkin J, Sterling P. Allostasis: A Brain-Centered, Predictive Mode of Physiological Regulation. Trends Neurosci. 2019 Oct;42(10):740-752. doi: 10.1016/j.tins.2019.07.010. PMID 31488322.
