= Peter Sterling =

Peter Sterling may refer to:

- Peter Sterling (neuroscientist) (born 1940), American anatomist, physiologist and neuroscientist
- Peter Sterling (rugby league), (born 1960), Australian rugby league commentator and former player
