= Patricia A. Wheeler =

American phycologist and oceanographer

- Education: University of California, Irvine
- Known for: physiological ecology of marine algae
- Spouse(s): John Cooper Westall, Ph.D.
- Scientific career
- Fields: Oceanography, Marine ecology, Phycology
- Workplaces: Oregon State University
- Thesis: The Uptake and Metabolism of Amino Acids by Marine phytoplankton
- Doctoral advisor: Grover C. Stephens
- Other academic advisors: Wheeler J. North

Patricia A. Wheeler is a retired American phycologist and oceanographer. She is known for her work physiology and ecology of marine phytoplankton and primary production in marine ecosystems.

== Biography ==
Wheeler grew up in Garden Grove, California and received her education at University of California, Irvine where she earned her B.S. and MS. Degrees, as well as earning her Ph.D. in 1976 studying in the laboratory of Grover C. Stephens. For several years thereafter, she held her first post-doctoral position in the laboratory of Wheeler J. North at the Kerckhoff Marine Laboratory in Corona del Mar, California focusing on kelp forest ecology. She also held postdoctoral positions at the University of Toronto and Harvard University, and held a visiting professorship for women at the University of Georgia.

Wheeler joined faculty at Oregon State University (OSU) in 1986. While on the faculty of Oregon State University she distinguished herself as a leading researcher on nutrient cycles and primary production in marine ecosystems, primarily in the Eastern Pacific and Arctic regions. On 15 June 1988, she married John Cooper Westall, a professor of chemistry at OSU. In 2009, she was named as editor of the Journal of Phycology.

== Selected publications ==
- Wheeler, P.A., B.B. North, and G.C. Stephens. 1974. Amino acid uptake by marine phytoplankters. Limnology and Oceanography 19: 249-259.
- Wheeler, P.A. and W.J. North. 1980. Effect of nitrogen supply on nitrogen content and growth rates of juvenile Macrocystis pyrifera (Phaeophyceae) sporophytes. Journal of Phycology 16: 577-582.
- Kirchman, D.L., R.G. Keil, and P.A. Wheeler. 1989. The effect of amino acids on ammonium utilization and regeneration by heterotrophic bacteria in the subarctic Pacific. Deep-Sea Research 36: 1763-1776.
- Miller, C.B., B.W. Frost, P.A. Wheeler, M.R. Landry, N. Welschmeyer, and T.M. Powell. 1991. Ecological dynamics in the subarctic Pacific, a possibly iron limited system. Limnology and Oceanography 36: 1600-1615.
- Dickson, M.-L. and P.A. Wheeler. 1995. Ammonium uptake and regeneration rates in a coastal upwelling regime. Marine Ecology Progress Series 121:239-248.
- Wheeler, P.A., M. Gosselin, E. Sherr, D. Thibault, D.L. Kirchman, R. Benner, and T.E. Whitledge. 1996. Active cycling of organic carbon in the central Arctic Ocean. Nature 380:697-699.
- Gosselin, M., M. Levasseur, P.A. Wheeler, R. Horner, and B.C. Booth. 1997. New measurements of phytoplankton and ice algal production in the Arctic Ocean. Deep-Sea Research 44: 1623-1644.
- Corwith, H.L. and P.A. Wheeler. 2002. El Niño related variations in nutrient and chlorophyll distributions off Oregon. Progress in Oceanography 54: 361-380.
- Huyer, A., J.H. Fleischbein, J. Keister, P.M. Kosro, N. Perlin, R.L. Smith, and P.A. Wheeler. 2005. Two coastal upwelling domains in the northern California Current system. Journal of Marine Research 63: 901-929.
- Wetz, M. S., B. Hales, Z. Chase, P.A. Wheeler, M.M. Whitney. 2006. Riverine input of macronutrients, iron, and organic matter to the coastal ocean off Oregon, USA, during the winter. Limnology and Oceanography 51: 2221-2231.
- Hauri, C., Gruber, N. Plattner, G-K. Alin, S., Feely, R.A., Hales, B. and Wheeler, P.A. 2009. Ocean acidification in the California Current System. Oceanography 22: 59-69.
- Miller, C.B. and P.A. Wheeler. 2012. Biological Oceanography, Second Edition, Wiley-Blackwell, Hoboken, N.J., 464 pp. ISBN 9781118223185
