= Stephen H. Wright =

American physiologist

Stephen Henry Wright
- Education: University of California, Irvine
- Known for: solute transport mechanisms in kidney tubules
- Spouse(s): Janis Mae Burt, Ph.D.
- Scientific career
- Fields: Physiology
- Workplaces: University of Arizona
- Thesis: Physiological characteristics of transport of amino acids in lamellibranch molluscs.
- Doctoral advisor: Grover C. Stephens
- Other academic advisors: John H. Crowe, Jared Diamond, Ernest M. Wright

Stephen H. Wright is an American physiologist. He is primarily known for his work on the mechanisms of organic solute transport in kidney tubules, but he is also known for work to describe transport of organic solutes across epithelial membranes by marine invertebrates.

== Biography ==
He received bachelor's and master's degrees in biological sciences at the University of California, Davis studying in the laboratory John H. Crowe. He earned his Ph.D. in 1978 studying in the laboratory of Grover C. Stephens. For several years thereafter, he held post-doctoral positions at the University of California, Los Angeles in the laboratories of Jared Diamond and Ernest M. Wright studying ionic and organic solute transport mechanisms in intestinal and kidney tubule epithelia. On 18 July 1978 shortly after finishing graduate school at Irvine, he married biologist Janis Mae Burt, Both Wright and Burt joined the faculty of the University of Arizona.

Wright joined faculty at the University of Arizona in 1982. While on the faculty of the University of Arizona he distinguished himself as a leading researcher in renal and transport physiology with three decades of funding by the National Institutes of Health, studying the renal transport of organic anions and cations at several different levels of biological organization.

== Selected publications ==
- S.H. Wright, T.L. Johnson, J.H. Crowe. 1975. Transport of amino acids by isolated gills of the mussel Mytilus californianus Conrad. Journal of Experimental Biology 62: 313–325.
- Manahan, D.T., S.H. Wright, G.C. Stephens and M.A. Rice. 1982. Transport of dissolved amino acids by the mussel, Mytilus edulis: Demonstration of net uptake from seawater by HPLC analysis. Science 215:1253-1255.
- Nord, E., S.H. Wright, I. Kippen, and E.M. Wright. 1982. Pathways for carboxylic acid transport by rabbit renal brush border membrane vesicles. American Journal of Physiology. Renal Physiology 243(5):F456-F462.
- Barendt, W.M. and S.H. Wright. 2002. The human organic cation transporter (hOCT2) recognizes the degree of substrate ionization. The Journal of Biological Chemistry 277(25):22491-22496.
- Groves, C.E., W.B. Suhre, N.J. Cherrington, & S.H. Wright. 2006. Sex differences in the mRNA, protein, and functional expression of organic anion transporter (OAT) 1, OAT3, and organic cation transporter (OCT) 2 in rabbit renal proximal tubules. Journal of Pharmacology and Experimental Therapeutics 316(2):743-752.
- International Transporter Consortium: K.M. Giacomini, S-M. Huang, D.J. Tweedie, L.Z. Benet, K.L.R. Brouwer, X. Chu, A. Dahlin, R. Evers, V. Fischer, K.M, Hillgren, K.A. Hoffmaster, T. Ishikawa, D. Keppler, R.B. Kim, C.A. Lee, M. Niemi, J.W. Polli, Y. Sugiyama, P.W. Swaan, J.A. Ware, S.H. Wright, S.W. Yee, M.J. Zamek-Gliszczynski, and L. Zhang. 2010. Membrane transporters in drug development Nature Reviews. Drug Discovery 9(3):215-36.
- Martínez-Guerrero L.J., K.K. Evans, W.H. Dantzler, S.H. Wright. 2016. The multidrug transporter MATE1 sequesters OCs within an intracellular compartment that has no influence on OC secretion in renal proximal tubules. American Journal of Physiology. Renal Physiology 310(1):F57-F67.
- Severance, A.C., P.J. Sandoval, S.H. Wright. 2017. Correlation between apparent substrate affinity and OCT2 transport turnover. Journal of Pharmacological and Experimental Therapies 362(3):405-412.
- Sandoval, P.J., K.M. Zorn, A.M. Clark, S. Ekins, & S.H. Wright. 2018. Assessment of substrate-dependent ligand interactions at the organic cation transporter OCT2 using six model substrates. Molecular Pharmacology94(3):1057-1068.
