= Gillian Einstein =

American Canadian neuroscientist

- Born: June 1952 (age 74); New York City
- Education: Harvard University, University of Pennsylvania
- Scientific career
- Fields: Neuroscience specializing in women's health
- Workplaces: Department of Psychology, University of Toronto
- Thesis: The Pattern of Synaptic Input from the Lateral Geniculate Nucleus to Layer IV, Area 17 of the Cat
- Academic advisors: Peter Sterling
- Website: Official website

Notes
- Distant cousin of Albert Einstein

Gillian Einstein is a faculty member in the Department of Psychology at the University of Toronto, and cross-appointed with the Dalla Lana School of Public Health. She holds the inaugural Wilfred and Joyce Posluns Chair in Women's Brain Health and Aging.

== Early life and education ==
Einstein was born in New York City, US. As her father was a member of the U.S. Air Force, her family moved between New York City, Texas and Massachusetts. She completed a Bachelor of Arts degree in the History of Art at Harvard University. Einstein then earned her PhD in 1984, working on neuroanatomy at the University of Pennsylvania.

== Research and career ==
Einstein in 2015 speaking on the importance of SABV in preclinical research.

Einstein joined Duke University in 1989 as an assistant professor and moved to the Centre for Research on Women's Health at Women's College Hospital in 2004.

In 2006, Einstein established the University of Toronto’s Collaborative Graduate Program in Women's Health (now known as the Collaborative Specialization in Women's Health). This program is based at the Dalla Lana School of Public Health, and is affiliated with the Women's College Research Institute (based at the Women's College Hospital). Einstein led the program as a Director from 2006 to 2016.

In 2007, Einstein edited Sex and the Brain for MIT Press.

Einstein's work is focussed on women's health, specifically, the anatomy of the female brain. With 72% of Canadian Alzheimer's sufferers being represented by women, Einstein explores why brain disorders like Alzheimer's disproportionately affect women. Einstein's research looks at the relationship between early menopause and decreased estrogen levels, and how this may negatively affect cognition. Further to the differences that gender may play on the human brain, Einstein further posits that the social and cultural context that accompanies being female or male can also have a significant effect on our biology.

Einstein has been outspoken on the subject of gender disparity in clinical health research. She participated in the scientific discussion that led to the US National Institutes of Health to form policies requiring even gender distribution in cell and animal studies.

In 2016, Einstein was awarded the inaugural Wilfred and Joyce Posluns Chair in Women's Brain Health and Aging. This chair is supported through the Wilfred Posluns' Family Foundation, the Canadian Institutes of Health Research, Alzheimer Society of Canada, and the Ontario Brain Institute.

== Personal life ==
Gillian Einstein is a distant cousin of Albert Einstein.
