= Sex as a biological variable =

Research policy

Sex as a biological variable (SABV) is a research policy recognizing sex as an important variable to consider when designing studies and assessing results. Research including SABV has strengthened the rigor and reproducibility of findings. Public research institutions including the European Commission, Canadian Institutes of Health Research, and the U.S. National Institutes of Health have instituted SABV policies. Editorial policies were established by various scientific journals recognizing the importance and requiring research to consider SABV.

== Background ==
=== Public research institutions ===
Gillian Einstein in 2015 speaking on the importance of SABV in preclinical research.

In 1999, the Institute Of Medicine established a committee on understanding the biology of sex and gender differences. In 2001, they presented a report that sex is an important variable in designing studies and assessing results. The quality and generalizability of biomedical research depends on the consideration of key biological variables, such as sex. To improve the rigor and reproducibility of research findings, the European Commission, Canadian Institutes of Health Research, and the U.S. National Institutes of Health (NIH) established policies on sex as a biological variable (SABV). Enrolling both men and women in clinical trials can impact the application of results and permit the identification of factors that affect the course of disease and the outcome of treatment.

In 2003, the European Commission (EC) began influencing investigators to include sex and gender in their research methodologies. The Canadian Institutes of Health Research (CIHR) requires four approaches: sex and gender integration in research proposals, sex and gender expertise among research teams, sex and gender platform in large consortiums, and starting in September 2015, the completion of sex and gender online training programs.

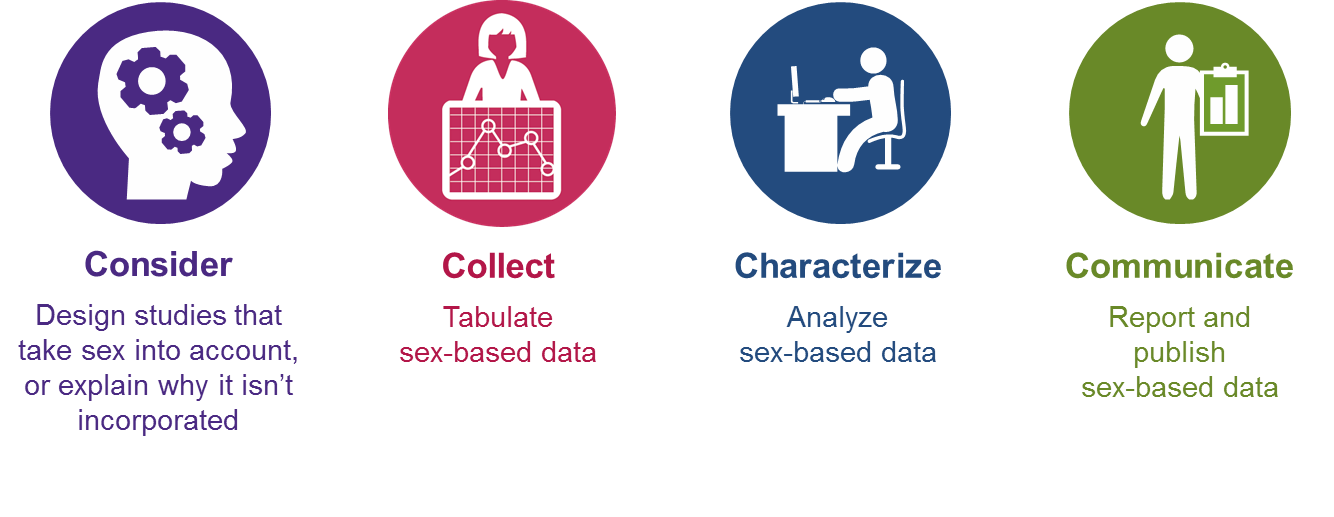
The NIH 4 Cs of Studying Sex to Strengthen Science.

In May 2014, the NIH announced the formation of SABV policy. The policy came into effect in 2015 which specified that "SABV is frequently ignored in animal study designs and analyses, leading to an incomplete understanding of potential sex-based differences in basic biological function, disease processes, and treatment response. NIH expects that sex as a biological variable will be factored into research designs, analyses, and reporting in vertebrate animal and human studies. Strong justification from the scientific literature, preliminary data or other relevant considerations must be provided for applications proposing to study only one sex." The review criteria should assess the extent to which the sex of participants has been incorporated into the research plan.

=== Scientific journals ===
In 2010, the National Centre for the Replacement, Refinement and Reduction of Animals in Research published the ARRIVE guidelines which promotes incorporating SABV in animal studies. In 2012, the American Physiological Society (APS) journals began requiring sex and gender to be reported in studies involving cells, tissues, animals, and humans. This APS editorial policy was not widely accepted by reviewers and researchers.

The European Association of Science Editors established the gender policy committee (GPC) in 2012. The GPC published Sex and Gender Equity in Research (SAGER) guidelines in 2016. In January 2017, the Journal of Neuroscience Research began requiring the consideration of SABV. The December 2017 ICMJE recommendations encouraged the use of SABV by researchers.

== Impact ==
Janine Austin Clayton in 2016 explaining SABV in clinical trials

Research incorporating sex as a biological variable increases the rigor and reproducibility of results. After publishing the NIH published SABV policy, there were increases in the percentage of scientists understanding and recognizing its importance. Some investigators were critical of the NIH SABV policy, saying it would increase cost and labor requirements. Including SABV in basic research and preclinical studies can reduce costs and time requirements to test sex differences in clinical trials.

Historically, there were concerns among researchers of the female reproductive system impacting findings in animal studies. Other studies using mice models found that despite the estrous cycle, variability was the same among sexes. Studies following SABV policies can identify potential hormonal variability in earlier phases of biomedical research.

A 2011 study by Beery and Zucker examined research involving non-human mammals published in 2009 across ten biological disciplines. Through this, researchers were able to identify a bias towards male animals in eight out of the ten disciplines. In neuroscience, studies involving only male animals outnumbered studies involving female animals by a ratio of 5.5 to 1. Corresponding ratios in pharmacology were 5 to 1 and in physiology 3.7 to 1 (Beery & Zucker, 2011).

In 2020, the NIH Office on Women's Health and the Food and Drug Administration Office of Women's Health created an educational tool, Bench-to-Bedside: Integrating Sex and Gender to Improve Human Health.
