= Hans Kuypers =

Dutch neuroscientist (1925–1989)

Henricus Gerardus Jacobus Maria Kuypers
- Born: 9 September 1925; Rotterdam
- Died: 26 September 1989 (aged 64); Cambridge
- Other name: Hans Kuypers
- Education: Leiden University (M.D.), University of Zurich (Ph.D.)
- Partner: M.F. (Toetie) Schaap
- Awards: Fellow of the Royal Society
- Scientific career
- Fields: Medicine, Neuroscience
- Workplaces: Western Reserve University, Erasmus University, Cambridge University
- Doctoral students: Peter Sterling

Henricus Gerardus Jacobus Maria Kuypers FRS (9 September 1925 – 26 September 1989), usually more simply known as Hans Kuypers, was a Dutch neuroscientist.

He was born in Rotterdam, Netherlands, studied medicine at Leiden University and was awarded a Ph.D. in 1952 by Zurich University for his work on neuroanatomy.

He was training as a neurologist at Groningen when he gave it up to move to Baltimore as assistant professor in the Department of Anatomy at the University of Maryland School of Medicine. He then moved on to Western Reserve University in Cleveland, Ohio as a full professor. In 1966 he returned to the Netherlands to be the foundation Professor of Anatomy at Erasmus University in Rotterdam, a position he held until 1984, when he was appointed Professor of Anatomy at Cambridge University.

Kuypers became a member of the Royal Netherlands Academy of Arts and Sciences in 1980, this was changed into a foreign membership in 1984.

He was elected a Fellow of the Royal Society in 1986, his candidature citation reading "Distinguished for his microanatomical mapping of the neuronal networks which interconnect particular areas of the neocortex with one another and with the thalamus, brainstem and spinal cord, especially in primates. His studies have involved the correlation of focal lesions in the brain with subtle disorders of motor performance, previously undetected but now exposed and analysed in ingenious behavioural experiments. He has made adventurous use of new microanatomical methods, invented or improved by himself, in order to examine descending pathways in the brainstem, such as the double labelling of cortical neurones by fluorescent dyes with different excitation wavelengths and chemical affinities, transported by axoplasmic flow in a retrograde direction from separately injected termini. The discoveries thus made through a powerful combination of complementary techniques have stimulated much behavioural and micro-physiological experimentation in his own and other laboratories".

He died in Cambridge in 1989. He had married M.F. (Toetie) Schaap, with whom he had four daughters and two sons.
