= Wheeler J. North =

Wheeler James North
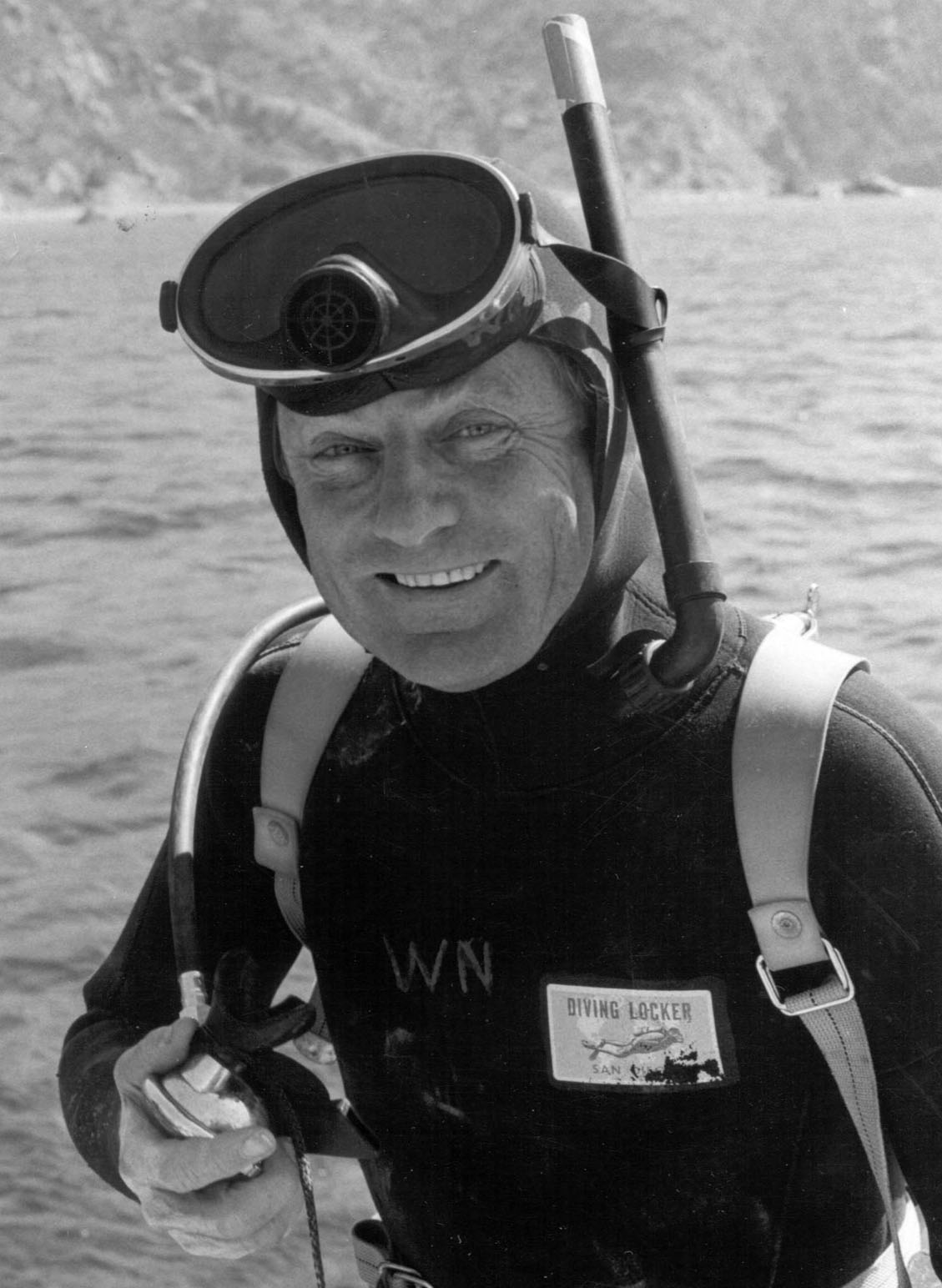
- Born: January 2, 1922; San Francisco, California, U.S.
- Died: December 20, 2002 (aged 80); Newport Beach, California, United States
- Education: California Institute of Technology, University of California
- Known for: kelp forest ecology
- Spouses: Nancy J. Fountain (m. 1952) Dr. Barbara Best North Ph.D., M.D. (m. 1964)
- Children: Hannah C. North and Wheeler O. North
- Scientific career
- Fields: Biological Oceanography, Marine ecology
- Workplaces: Scripps Institution of Oceanography, California Institute of Technology
- Doctoral advisor: Denis Fox

Wheeler James North (January 2, 1922 – December 20, 2002), born in San Francisco, California, was a marine biologist and environmental scientist at the Scripps Institution of Oceanography and the California Institute of Technology. He is best known for his pioneering work to understand the ecology of California’s coastal kelp forests, and pioneering work in biomass fuels and the sequestration of atmospheric carbon dioxide.

== Early life, military service and education ==
Wheeler James North was born January 2, 1922, in San Francisco to Wheeler O. and Florence (Ross) North, and grew up at a mining camp at La Fe in Zacatecas, Mexico, as his father was a mining engineer and his mother was an assay chemist. In 1927, the family moved to La Jolla, California. In 1940, North graduated from The Thacher School in Ojai, California and entered college at the California Institute of Technology (Caltech). While still in college in December 1942, North enlisted in the U.S. Army Signal Corps, which allowed him to complete his bachelor's degree in electrical engineering in 1944. After training in U.S. Army Officers Candidate School at Fort Monmouth in New Jersey, he was commissioned as a second lieutenant in the Signal Corps and assigned to the Philippines. However, North arrived in Southeast Asia after VJ Day in August 1945 but stayed in the Philippines and Japan as part of the American occupying forces until August 1946. After two years working with the U.S. Navy Electronics Laboratory in San Diego, North returned to Caltech in September 1948 and completed a second bachelor's degree in biology in 1950. North earned masters and Ph.D. degrees in Biological Oceanography at the University of California Scripps Institution of Oceanography in 1953 studying in the laboratory of Denis Fox. North undertook postdoctoral work with a National Science Foundation fellowship at the Plymouth Marine Laboratory and Cambridge University in England.

== Academic career ==
Wheeler James North began his academic career teaching at Scripps Institution of Oceanography in 1953, after which North joined the faculty of the California Institute of Technology (Caltech) in September 1962. Although North taught marine biology courses at the Caltech main campus in Pasadena, North spent much of his time undertaking research at the Caltech’s Kerckhoff Marine Laboratory in Corona del Mar.

North’s principal research interest was marine ecology, specifically the kelp beds off Southern California and the population ecology of sea urchins. North studied the effects of sewage outfalls and El Niño on kelp forests, and the predation of kelp by sea urchins. North served as a consultant for California’s kelp-harvesting industry. North was one of the first marine scientists to employ SCUBA technology for marine research beginning as a student in 1949. While at Scripps, North worked with group studying the physiology of diving and was a pioneer in establishing scientific diving safety protocols. North was a consulting scientist after the 1969 Santa Barbara oil spill, and after 1973 oil crisis, he studied the possibility of kelp farms to produce biomass as an alternative fuel. North contributed to the growth of the kelp farming industry in China. North also studied the ecological effects of warm-water discharges from nuclear power plants on kelp forests, and in the early 1990s North undertook studies to reduce atmospheric carbon dioxide using marine biomass and clathrate hydrates.

== Selected publications ==
Underwater California by Wheeler J. North 1975 University of California Press

- North, W.J. and C.F.A. Pantin. (1958). Sensitivity to light in the sea-anemone Metridium senile (L): adaptation and action spectra. Proceedings of the Royal Society of London. Series B, Biological Sciences, 148:385-396.
- North, W.J. (1968). The Golden Guide to Scuba Diving: Handbook of Underwater Activities. Golden Press, New York. 160pp. ISBN 978-0-307-24012-5.
- North, W.J. and J.S. Pearse. (1970). Sea urchin population explosion in southern California coastal waters. Science 167:209-210.
- North, W.J. (1975). Underwater California. University of California Press, Berkeley. 320pp. ISBN 978-0-520-03039-8.
- North, W.J. (1979). Adverse factors affecting giant kelp and associated seaweeds. Cellular and Molecular Life Sciences. 35:445-447.
- Wheeler, P.A. and W.J. North (1981). Nitrogen supply, tissue composition and frond growth rates for Macrocystis pyrifera off the coast of southern California. Marine Biology 64:59-69.
- Wilson, K.C. and W.J. North (1983). A review of kelp bed management in southern California. Journal of the World Mariculture Society 14:345-359.
- Wilcox, H.A. and W.J. North (1988). Carbon dioxide reduction and reforestation. Science 247:1493-1494.
- North, W.J., V. R. Blackwell, and J.J. Morgan. (1992). Studies of carbon dioxide hydrate formation and dissolution. Environmental Science and Technology 32(5):676-681.

== Personal life and legacy ==
Wheeler James North was married on 16 Aug 1952 in La Jolla to Nancy J. Fountain (1927-2011) of Oklahoma, who was a laboratory technician at Scripps Oceanographic Institution and they had a daughter Hannah C. North (b. 1955) and son Wheeler O. North (b. 1957). On April 25, 1964, North married his second wife, biologist Barbara A. Best. In 1974, Barbara Best North was a co-author along with Grover C. Stephens of a textbook on Biology. She received further training as a physician and she entered private practice specializing in holistic health. Upon North's death on December 20, 2002, at Newport Beach, California, the Southern California Academy of Sciences established the Wheeler North Award for Scientific Excellence given for excellence in research emphasizing the Southern California area and a commitment to the Southern California scientific community.
