= John H. Crowe =

American physiologist

John Henry Crowe
- Born: April 21, 1943 (age 83); North Carolina, US
- Education: Wake Forest University, University of California, Riverside
- Known for: cryobiology, tardigrade biology, use of trehalose as a cryoprotectant
- Spouse(s): Lois McConnell Crowe, Ph.D.
- Awards: UC Davis medal (2018)
- Scientific career
- Fields: Comparative physiology, Biochemistry
- Workplaces: University of California, Davis
- Thesis: Cryptobiosis in the tardigrade, Macrobiotus areolatus Murray : structure and function of the cuticle
- Doctoral advisor: Irwin Mayer Newell
- Other academic advisors: Robert P. Higgins

John Henry Crowe (born 1943) is an American comparative physiologist. He is primarily known for his work on the mechanisms dehydration and rehydration of cryptobiotic organism, including tardigrades. His work included the discovery of trehalose as a cryoprotectant for cell membranes and the use of trehalose and other cryoprotectants for the preservation of human blood components including platelets for longer-term storage

== Biography ==
John H. Crowe was born 21 April 1943 in North Carolina, United States and spent his formative years in Morehead City, North Carolina where he developed a passion for marine sciences. He received his bachelor's degree in (1965) in biological sciences at Wake Forest University studying in the laboratory Robert P. Higgins, and publishing his first paper on tardigrade biology with Higgins. Crowe earned his Ph.D. in 1970 at the University of California, Riverside studying in the laboratory of entomologist Irwin Mayer Newell. Crowe joined the faculty at the University of California, Davis in 1970, and 30 July 1972 he married biologist Lois M. McConnell in Davis. In addition to being life partners, John and Lois Crowe were lifelong scientific partners at UC Davis as well, co-authoring dozens of papers related to trehalose and cryoprotection.

== Selected publications ==
- Crowe, J.H., & Higgins, R.P. 1967. The revival of Macrobiotus areolatus Murray (Tardigrada) from the cryptobiotic state. Transactions of the American Microscopical Society 86(3):286-294.
- Crowe, J.H., I.M. Newell, and W.W. Thomson. Echiniscus viridis (Tardigrada). 1970. Fine structure of the cuticle. Transactions of the American Microscopical Society 89(2): 316–25.
- S.H. Wright, T.L. Johnson, J.H. Crowe. 1975. Transport of amino acids by isolated gills of the mussel Mytilus californianus Conrad. Journal of Experimental Biology 62: 313–325.
- Crowe, J.H., L.M. Crowe, D. Chapman. 1984. Preservation of membranes in anhydrobiotic organisms: The role of trehalose. Science 223(4637):701-703.
- Carpenter, J.F. and J.H. Crowe. 1988. The mechanism of cryoprotection of proteins by solutes. Cryobiology 25(3):244-255.
- Crowe, J.H, F.A. Hoekstra, and L.M. Crowe. 1992. Anhydrobiosis. Annual Review of Physiology 54(1):579-599.
- Wolkers, W.F., N.J. Walker, F. Tablin, and J.H. Crowe. 2001. Human platelets loaded with trehalose survive freeze-drying. Cryobiology 42(2):79-87.
- Crowe, J.H. 2008. Trehalose and anhydrobiosis: the early work of JS Clegg. Journal of Experimental Biology 18:2899-2900.
- Muller, R., F. Betsou, M.G. Barnes, K. Harding, J. Bonnet, O. Kofanova, and J.H.Crowe. 2016. Preservation of biospecimens at ambient temperature: Special focus on nucleic acids and opportunities for the biobanking community. Biopreservation and Biobanking 14(2):89-98.
