= Michael A. Rice =

American politician and fisheries expert

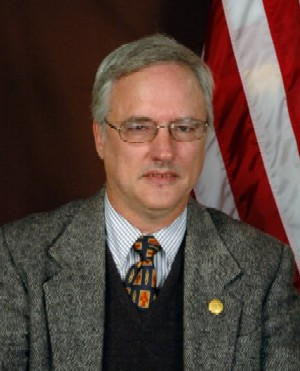

Member of the Rhode Island House of Representatives from the 35th district
- In office January 3, 2009 – January 3, 2011
- Preceded by: John Patrick Shanley, Jr.
- Succeeded by: Spencer E. Dickinson

Personal details
- Born: March 4, 1955 (age 71) San Jose, California, U.S.
- Party: Democratic
- Spouse: Rufina Delizo Rice
- Children: Maria Isabel Rice, Esq.
- Profession: Professor of Fisheries & Aquaculture at University of Rhode Island
- Scientific career
- Education: University of San Francisco, University of California, Irvine
- Known for: aquaculture of bivalves
- Fields: Aquaculture, Environmental physiology
- Workplaces: University of Rhode Island
- Thesis: Transepithelial flux of amino acids in three species of marine bivalve molluscs (1987)
- Doctoral advisor: Grover C. Stephens
- Website: http://web.uri.edu/favs/michael-a-rice/

Michael Alan Rice (born March 4, 1955) is an American professor of fisheries and aquaculture at the University of Rhode Island and former state representative from South Kingstown, Rhode Island. A Democrat, he served in the Rhode Island House of Representatives, representing the 35th district, encompassing the village of Kingston and West Kingston, and parts of the neighborhoods of Tuckertown, Wakefield and Peace Dale. Rice was first elected on November 4, 2008, and served from January 3, 2009, to January 3, 2011.

== Education and early career ==
Rice was born in San Jose, California, to Richard Eugene Rice and Marilyn Joyce (Cardoza) Rice. He is a descendant of 19th-century Azorean settlers in California, thus being of Portuguese descent, and a direct patrilineal descendant of New England colonist Edmund Rice.

Michael Rice earned the rank of Eagle Scout in 1972 in Garden Grove, California. Rice attended Servite High School in Anaheim, California before attending the University of San Francisco, and graduating with a B.S. in biology in 1977. While working in the laboratory of physiologist Grover C. Stephens at the University of California, Irvine, he earned both a master's degree in biology in 1981 and a PhD. in comparative physiology in 1987.

Rice served in the U.S. Peace Corps in the Philippines from 1981 to 1985 working with the Bureau of Fisheries and Aquatic Resources. During that time, he worked to improve the sanitary quality of farmed oysters. In 1982, while working with José Maria DeGuzman of Value Trading Company Inc. in Dagupan, he helped establish the first commercially successful farm for serranid grouper fish in the Philippines.

== Academic career ==
Rice has spent most of his career in academia, first appointed to the faculty of the University of Rhode Island (URI) in October 1987. His academic research interests are in the area of environmental physiology and ecology of bivalve molluscs, and he has further research interests in the field of aquaculture. His major contributions have been the demonstration that bivalve mollusks have the ability to absorb amino acids directly from seawater as a nutrition source, and that bivalves serve an important role in mediating the cycling of nitrogen and other nutrients within marine ecosystems. Additionally, he has studied the effects of shellfishing on the population ecology of bivalves. His research has led to refinements to the practice of managing shellfishery resources in coastal waters, estuaries and marine protected areas.

Rice has made contributions the science of shellfishery management and to the growth of the aquaculture industry in Rhode Island, and internationally, including the Philippines, Tanzania, Georgia, Indonesia and The Gambia. Working with Enrico Beridze of the Iberian Pontomarine Aquaculture Company, he introduced mussel farming to the Black Sea coast of Georgia. He has led a study of invasive Australian crayfish in the Zambezi River watershed of Zambia. Rice has been the recipient of three Fulbright Scholarship awards: Republic of the Philippines 1996–97; Indonesia 1997; and Republic of the Philippines 2006.

At the University of Rhode Island he served as Chairman of the Department of Fisheries, Animal and Veterinary Science from 2000 to 2004, and again from 2025 to 2026. Rice served as Chairman/President of the URI Faculty Senate from 2005 to 2007, and again from 2022 to 2023. He subsequently served as the Grand Marshal of the 2023 Spring Commencement Ceremonies.

== Civic involvement and politics ==
Rice has served from 1999 to 2000 as the president of the Tavern Hall Club, a not-for-profit organization in Kingston, RI dedicated to the preservation of the historic (1738) Elisha Reynolds House as a community meeting place and social center. He has also served as the President of the University Club of URI from 1995 to 1996. He was elected in 2007 to the board of directors and in 2008 as treasurer of the Edmund Rice (1638) Association, a genealogical and family history association that meets annually in Sudbury, Massachusetts. In 2011, Rice was nominated by Bruce Sundlun and appointed by Lincoln Chafee as a Rhode Island Commodore.

Prior to election to the Rhode Island House of Representatives in 2008, Rice served as an appointed member of a number of governmental commissions, including the Conservation Commission of South Kingstown from 1992 to 2008. He chaired that commission from 1998 to 2008. Also prior to election, he was appointed by the Speaker of the RI House of Representatives, to the Legislative Commission on Aquaculture Development (1995–1998), to the Legislative Commission to Develop and Coordinate a Collaborative Effort to Formulate a Restoration Plan for the North Cape Barge Oil Spill (1999), and as Legislative Commissioner proxy delegate to meetings of the Atlantic States Marine Fisheries Commission (1999–2000). Rice took an active advocacy role in developing recreational marine fishing licenses to gather fishery harvest data and to fund enhanced fishery management efforts within Rhode Island state waters.

In 2008, upon the decision of incumbent Rep. John Patrick Shanley (D-South Kingstown) not to run for a fifth term in the Rhode Island House of Representatives, Rice ran and was challenged by Republican James K. Haldeman for the open seat. In the election held on November 4, 2008, Rice defeated Haldeman by 57.5% to 42.5%, carrying each of the district's five precincts.

During the 2009 legislative session, Rice served on the House Committee on Separation of Powers and Government Oversight. In the 2010 session, he served on the Committee on Environment and Natural Resources, and the House committees on Separation of Powers, Government Oversight, and Constituent Services, as well as the Special House Commission to Study the Structure and Workings of the Rhode Island Department of Transportation.

Rice was defeated for reelection by Spencer E. Dickinson in the September 14, 2010 Democratic Primary by a margin of 52.8-47.2%. He was targeted for defeat by the Rhode Island Labor Movement after voting against expansion of pension benefits for workers.

In 2011, Rice was appointed to the Rhode Island Democratic Party State Committee representing at-large Rhode Island's 2nd congressional district, serving until 2017. In 2013 he was appointed by Governor Chafee and received confirmation by the Rhode Island Senate to serve a two and a half-year partial term on the Rhode Island Marine Fisheries Council, and reappointed to two terms by Governor Raimondo ending on 1 April 2024. He has been active with the American Association of University Professors.

== Selected publications ==
- Rice, M.A. and P.K. Chien. 1979. Uptake, binding and clearance of divalent cadmium in Glycera dibranchiata (Annelida:Polychaeta). Marine Biology 53:33-39.
- Manahan, D.T., S.H. Wright, G.C. Stephens and M.A. Rice. 1982. Transport of dissolved amino acids by the mussel, Mytilus edulis: Demonstration of net uptake from seawater by HPLC analysis. Science 215:1253-1255.
- Rice, M.A., C. Hickox, and I. Zehra. 1989. Effects of intensive fishing effort on the population structure of quahogs, Mercenaria mercenaria (Linn. 1758) in Narragansett Bay. Journal of Shellfish Research 8:345-354.
- Rice, M.A., R.B. Rheault, Jr., M.S. Perez and V.S. Perez. 1994. Experimental culture and particle filtration by Asian moon scallops, Amusium pleuronectes. Asian Fisheries Science 7:179-185.
- Rheault, R.B., Jr., and M.A. Rice. 1996. Food-limited growth and condition index in the oyster Crassostrea virginica (Gmelin, 1791) and the bay scallop Argopecten irradians (Lamarck 1819). Journal of Shellfish Research 15:271-283.
- Pietros, J.M. and M.A. Rice. 2003. The impacts of aquacultured oysters, Crassostrea virginica (Gmelin, 1791) on water quality and sedimentation: results of a mesocosm study. Aquaculture 220:407-422.
- Marroquin-Mora, D.C. and M.A. Rice. 2008. Gonadal cycle of northern quahogs, Mercenaria mercenaria (Linn. 1758), from fished and non-fished subpopulations in Narragansett Bay. Journal of Shellfish Research 27:643-652.
- Rice, M.A. 2010. A brief history of the American Fish Culture Company 1877–1997. Rhode Island History 68(1):20-35.
- Rice, M.A., P.D. Rawson, A.D. Salinas and W.R. Rosario. 2016. Identification and salinity tolerance of the western hemisphere mussel Mytella charruana (d'Orbigny, 1842) in the Philippines. Journal of Shellfish Research 35:865-873.
- Nambeye E., C. Katapa, B. Chimai-Mulenga, H.G. Mudenda, M. Eilitta, and M.A. Rice, 2025. The bio-invasion and population dynamics of Cherax quadricarinatus in Zambian waters. African Journal of Aquatic Science 50(1):88-98.

== Selected legislation as enacted ==
- 2009-H5690a. An Act Relating to Agriculture and Forestry—Diseases and Parasites. This act established the Asian long-horned beetle and emerald ash borer beetles as nuisances. It also established penalties for unlawful importation and transportation of these invasive beetles and infested logs.
- 2009-H6226aa An Act Relating to Fish and Wildlife -- Recreational Saltwater Fishing License. This act created a recreational saltwater fishing license and made it unlawful to fish in the marine waters of the state without first obtaining a license. Funds derived from licenses are for enhancing recreational marine fisheries. The dedicated funds allowed for considerable expansion of the marine fisheries management and public programming by the Rhode Island Department of Environmental Management.
- 2010-H7007 An Act Relating to State Affairs and Government - Historian Laureate of Rhode Island. This act would establish the position of historian laureate in Rhode Island. Established RIGL §42-100.1-1 to §42-100.1-7 Historian Laureate of Rhode Island.
