= Burns & McDonnell =

US construction, architecture and engineering company

Coordinates: 38.958574°N 94.599673°W

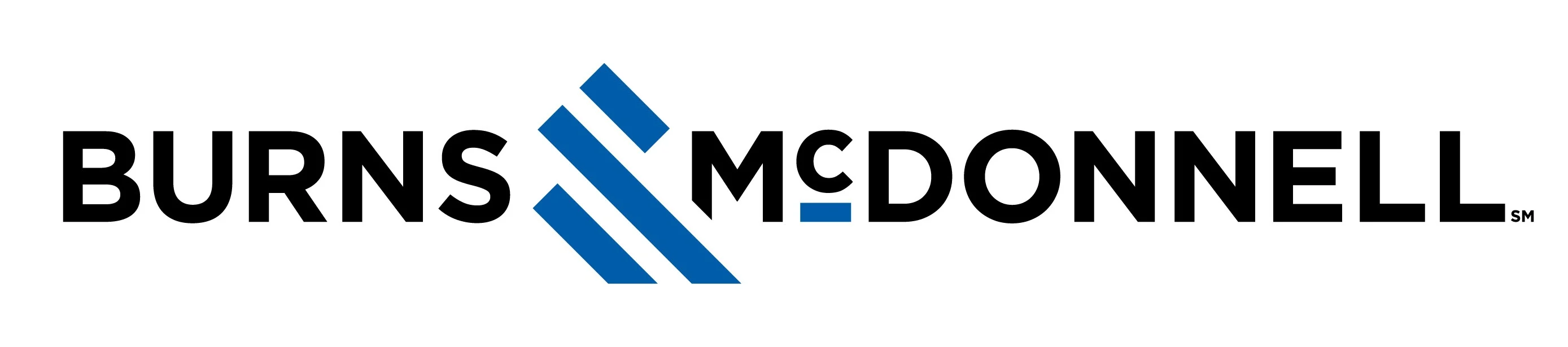
- Type: Private, employee-owned
- Industry: Architecture; Construction; Engineering
- Founded: 1898; 128 years ago
- Headquarters: Kansas City, Missouri, United States
- Number of locations: 75+ offices
- Area served: Worldwide
- Revenue: ▲US$6.9 billion (2023)
- Number of employees: 13,500+ (2023)
- Website: www.burnsmcd.com

Burns & McDonnell is an American multinational construction, architecture and engineering firm based in Kansas City, Missouri, and has 100% employee stock ownership. It was established in 1898 by engineers Clinton Sumner Burns and Robert Emmett McDonnell. The company is one of the largest design firms in the world, its global revenues reached US$$6.9 billion and employed over 13,500 professionals worldwide.

In April 2023, it was announced that CEO Ray Kowalik would retire at the end of 2023 and be succeeded by Leslie Duke.

== History ==
=== Early history ===
Burns & McDonnell was founded by two Stanford University graduates that had experienced successful teamwork while working in Palo Alto. They chose Kansas City as it was deemed to provide work for the two engineers. Robert E. McDonnell became the firm's promoter towards the region's municipalities, while Clinton S. Burns focused on the technical aspect. They offered solutions for sewer systems and waterworks.

=== Armco Steel ===
In 1971, the firm was bought by Armco Steel, based in Ohio. As Armco prepared to sell Burns & McDonnell in the early 1980s, its employees opted to buy the company themselves and took on a loan to finance a buyout in 1985. The loan was provided by the United Missouri Bank.

== Employee ownership ==
Its employee ownership status is considered a factor in producing higher workforce efficiency. The Employee Stock Ownership Plan (ESOP) owns 98% of Burns & McDonnell and management has 2%. All employees have the right to join the ESOP and are provided shares according to their contribution to the company with a cap of up to $265,000. Its workforce grew from 600 in 1985, to 5,600 in 2016 while its annual revenue rose from $41 million to $2.5 billion in the same timespan. By 2021, it had 7,600 employee-owners and the revenue rose to $5.7 billion in 2022. In 2016, the Houston office introduced a flexibility plan, which allowed the employees to shape their workplans in a way that they could take off every second Friday.

== Acquisitions ==
Originally an engineering company, it has expanded its focus into several areas throughout its history. In 1983, it acquired the C.W. Nofsinger Company, part of the chemical industry, and rebranded it as the Process & Industrial Group (P&I). In 2010, it purchased the specialist in bridge construction Harrington & Cortelyou and in 2016 it purchased AZCO from Wisconsin. AZCO has collaborated with Burns & McDonnell for decades in construction projects and was also 100% owned by its employees. In 2018, Ref-Chem from Baton Rouge, Louisiana was also acquired by Burns & McDonnell.

== Industry ==
Burns & McDonnell is among the largest Engineering/Architecture companies in the US and a prominent contributor to US market for electrical designs. It is active in the construction of military facilities, wind and solar energy installations, aviation, health care, and is active in the oil and chemical industry. In 2020, it was involved in raising the levels of twenty-one bridges over the highways I-35 and I-335 in Sumner and Sedgwick counties in Kansas.

== Locations ==
The company is headquartered in Kansas City, Missouri, and mainly active in the US, but also internationally. It is represented in over 50 cities across the US, and has multiple branches in Canada, the United Kingdom and India; with singular offices also located in Dubai and Mexico City.

https://www.burnsmcd.com/about/locations

== Awards ==
Burns & McDonnell has received numerous accolades from the American Councils of the Engineering industry and is considered good to work for in the US by Fortune. In 2012, it received the ESOP of the year Award.
