= Dorothy Sterling =

American journalist (1913–2008)

- Born: Dorothy Dannenberg; November 23, 1913; New York City
- Died: December 1, 2008 (aged 95); Wellfleet, Massachusetts
- Occupations: Writer and journalist
- Spouse: Philip Sterling
- Children: Anne Fausto-Sterling; Peter Sterling

Dorothy Sterling (née Dannenberg; November 23, 1913 – December 1, 2008) was an American writer and historian. After college, she worked as a journalist and writer in New York for several years, including work for the Federal Writers' Project.

== Biography ==
Sterling worked for Time from 1936 to 1949 and was then assistant bureau chief in Life's news bureau from 1944 to 1949.

Starting in the 1950s, she authored more than 30 books, mainly non-fiction historical works for children on the origins of the women's and anti-slavery movements, civil rights, segregation, and nature, as well as mysteries.

== Personal life ==
In 1937, she married Philip Sterling (died 1989), also a writer. Her daughter, Anne Fausto-Sterling, is a noted biologist, the Nancy Duke Lewis Professor of Biology and Gender Studies at Brown University, and is married to playwright Paula Vogel. Her son, Peter Sterling, is a well-known neuroscientist and coiner of the term allostasis.

Sterling belonged to the Communist Party USA in the 1940s. Even after leaving the party, she said socialism was her long-term goal.

In early 1968, Sterling and her husband joined 448 writers and editors in placing a full-page ad in the New York Post declaring their intention to refuse to pay taxes for the Vietnam War. In 1984, she challenged President Ronald Reagan's decision to award the Medal of Freedom to Whittaker Chambers, writing, "With all due respect to the dead, is this man, who has left behind him so many doubts about his own role, an appropriate recipient of the Medal of Freedom, the nation's highest civilian award?"

== Bibliography ==
=== Nature ===
(1951) Sophie and Her Puppies
(1955) The story of mosses, ferns, and mushrooms
(1956) The story of caves
(1961) Ellen's Blue Jays
(1961) Caterpillars
(1966) Fall is Here!
(1967) The Outer Lands Natural History Guide to Cape Cod & Islands by Dorothy Sterling and Winifred Lubell

=== Mysteries ===
(1952) The Cub Scout Mystery
(1955) The Brownie Scout Mystery
(1958) The Silver Spoon Mystery by Dorothy Sterling
(1960) Secret of the Old Post-Box
(1971) Mystery of the Empty House (Org. Secret of the Old Post Box) by Dorothy Sterling and Jane Goldsborough

=== Black history and civil rights ===
(1953) United Nations, N. Y.
(1954) Freedom Train: The Story of Harriet Tubman
(1959) Mary Jane
(1963) Forever Free: The Story of the Emancipation Proclamation
(1964) Lucretia Mott
(1965) Lift Every Voice: The Lives of Booker T. Washington, W.E.B. Du Bois, Mary Church Terrell and James Weldon Johnson
(1969) Tear Down the Walls!: A History of the American Civil Rights Movement
(1978) Captain of the Planter: The Story of Robert Smalls
(1984) We Are Your Sisters: Black Women in the Nineteenth Century
(1994) The Trouble They Seen: Story of Reconstruction in the Words of African Americans
(1994) Ahead of Her Time: Abby Kelly and the Politics of Antislavery
(1996) The Making of an Afro-American: Martin Robison Delany 1812-1885
(1998) Speak Out in Thunder Tones

=== Autobiography ===
(2005) Close to My Heart: An Autobiography

== Awards ==
- Inclusion in the 1960-1961 William Allen White Children's Book Award Masterlist of Captain of the Planter: The Story of Robert Smalls
- 1977 Carter G. Woodson Book Award winner for The Trouble They Seen: Story of Reconstruction in the Words of African Americans
