= Ernest M. Wright =

American physiologist

Ernest Marshall Wright
- Born: 1940 (age 85–86); Belfast, Northern Ireland, United Kingdom
- Education: University of London, University of Sheffield
- Known for: characterization of glucose and sodium co-transporters in cell membranes
- Awards: Fellow of the Royal Society, Fellow of the Biophysical Society, Member of the National Academy of Sciences
- Scientific career
- Fields: Physiology
- Workplaces: University of California, Los Angeles
- Doctoral advisor: David Smyth FRS
- Other academic advisors: Arthur K. Solomon

Ernest Marshall Wright FRS (born 1940) is an Irish-born American physiologist. He is primarily known for his work on the mechanisms of glucose-sodium co-transporters in intestinal and other tissues in humans and animals.

== Biography ==
Ernest M. Wright was born in 1940 in Belfast, Northern Ireland. He received his bachelors degree in physiology and chemistry at the University of London in 1961, and his Ph.D. in physiology in 1964 after studies in the laboratory of David Smyth FRS at the University of Sheffield. He became a member of the faculty at Sheffield, and two years later received a Fellowship at Harvard where he studied with Jared Diamond and Stanley Schultz in the Biophysics Laboratory headed by Arthur K. Solomon. In 1978 he was awarded a D.Sc. in Physiology from the University of London.

Wright joined faculty at the University of California, Los Angeles in 1967. While on the faculty of UCLA College of Medicine he distinguished himself as a leading researcher in glucose transporters in a wide variety of tissues. His work is the foundation of research leading to medical treatments for diabetes and obesity. Wright received the Senator Jacob K. Javits Neuroscience Investigator Award from the National Institutes of Health from 1985 to 1992, and was named the Walter Bradford Cannon Distinguished Lecturer by the American Physiological Society in 1989. He was inducted as a Fellow of the Royal Society in 2005 and a Fellow of the Biophysical Society that same year.

== Selected publications ==
- Diamond, J.M. and E.M. Wright. 1969. Molecular forces governing non-electrolyte permeation through cell membranes. Proceedings of the Royal Society B 172(1028):273-316.
- Wright, E.M. 1972. Active Transport of Lysergic Acid Diethylamide. Nature 240:53–54
- Nord, E., S.H. Wright, I. Kippen, and E.M. Wright. 1982. Pathways for carboxylic acid transport by rabbit renal brush border membrane vesicles. American Journal of Physiology. Renal Physiology 243(5):F456-F462.
- Meinild A, D.A. Klaerke, D.D. Loo, E.M. Wright, and T. Zeuthen. 1998 The human Na+-glucose cotransporter is a molecular water pump. Journal of Physiology 508(Pt 1):15-21.
- Quick, M., and E.M. Wright. 2002. Employing Escherichia coli to functionally express, purify, and characterize a human transporter. Proceedings of the National Academy of Sciences 99(13):8597-8601.
- Loo, D.F., B.A. Hirayama, M. Sala-Rabanal, and E.M. Wright. 2008. How drugs interact with transporters: SGLT1 as a model. Journal of Membrane Biology 223(2):87-106.
- Wright, E.M., D.F Loo, and B.A. Hirayama. 2011. Biology of human sodium glucose transporters. Physiological Reviews 91(2):733-794.
