= John P. Shanley Jr. =

American politician (1944–2021)

Member of the Rhode Island House of Representatives from the 35th district
- In office January 3, 2003 – January 3, 2009
- Preceded by: Denise C. Aiken
- Succeeded by: Michael A. Rice

Member of the Rhode Island House of Representatives from the 49th district
- In office January 3, 2001 – January 3, 2003
- Preceded by: Leona A. Kelly
- Succeeded by: David E. Laroche

Personal details
- Born: May 31, 1944 Providence, Rhode Island, US
- Died: August 3, 2021 (aged 77) South Kingstown, Rhode Island, U.S.
- Party: Democratic
- Education: Providence College (BA); University of Rhode Island (MA)

Military service
- Branch/service: United States Army
- Years of service: 1966–1968
- Battles/wars: Vietnam War

John Patrick Shanley Jr. (May 31, 1944 – August 3, 2021) was an American politician who served as a South Kingstown Democratic member of the Rhode Island House of Representatives from 2001 to 2009, representing the Rhode Island General Assembly's 49th House district for his first term and the Rhode Island General Assembly's 35th House district for three more terms, following the Rhode Island General Assembly's 2002 redistricting.

Shanley is not related to playwright John Patrick Shanley.

== Personal life ==
Shanley was born in 1944, to Esther Joyce Shanley and John Patrick Shanley in Providence, Rhode Island. Shanley attended and graduated from Bishop Hendricken High School in 1962. He received a bachelor's degree in political science from Providence College in 1966. Shanley then joined the United States Army during the Vietnam War, and served until 1968, when he then obtained a master's degree in Sociology from the University of Rhode Island.

Shanley worked for the Rhode Island Department of Corrections for 25 years starting from 1968 as a probation and parole officer for juvenile delinquents. After retirement from the Department of Corrections, Shanley served as an associate professor at the Roger Williams University School of Justice Studies from 1995 to 1999 and served as a grant writer for Justice Assistance Corporation from 1999 to 2001.

Shanley served on the board of governors for the Rhode Island Blue Cross and Blue Shield as well as on the Rhode Island Governor's Justice Committee.

Shanley was married to Elaine Davis. They had two children together, Ann and Margaret.

Shanley was 77 when he died at his South Kingstown home in 2021.

== Political career ==
Shanley was first elected to represent the Rhode Island General Assembly's 49th House district in the 2000 election; however, following the Rhode Island General Assembly's 2002 redistricting, he was redistricted to the 35th House district, where he served three more terms.

Shanley served on the House Finance Committee, the House Municipal Government and Housing Committee, and was Co-Chair of the House Veteran's Affairs Committee.

Shanley served as a Deputy Majority Leader from 2007 to 2009.

Shanley chose not to run for a fifth term in 2008 and was succeeded by Rhode Island Commodore Michael A. Rice.

== Elections ==
- 2000 Shanley ran unopposed in the September 12, 2000, Democratic primary, winning with 616 votes and won the November 7, 2000, General election with 3,310 votes, defeating Republican nominee Robert B. Votava.
- 2002 Shanley ran unopposed in the September 10, 2002, Democratic primary, winning with 729 votes and won the November 5, 2002, General election with 1,977 votes, defeating Republican nominee Malcolm J. MacKenzie and Independent Robert B. Votava.
- 2004 Shanley ran unopposed in the September 7, 2004, Democratic primary, winning with 301 votes and won the November 2, 2004, General election with 3,055 votes (64.09%), defeating Republican nominee Malcolm J. MacKenzie.
- 2006 Shanley ran unopposed in the September 12, 2006, Democratic primary, winning with 539 votes and won the November 7, 2006, General election with 2,601 votes (58.62%), defeating Republican nominee James K. Haldeman.
