= Clinton Sumner Burns =

American civil engineer (1871–1924)

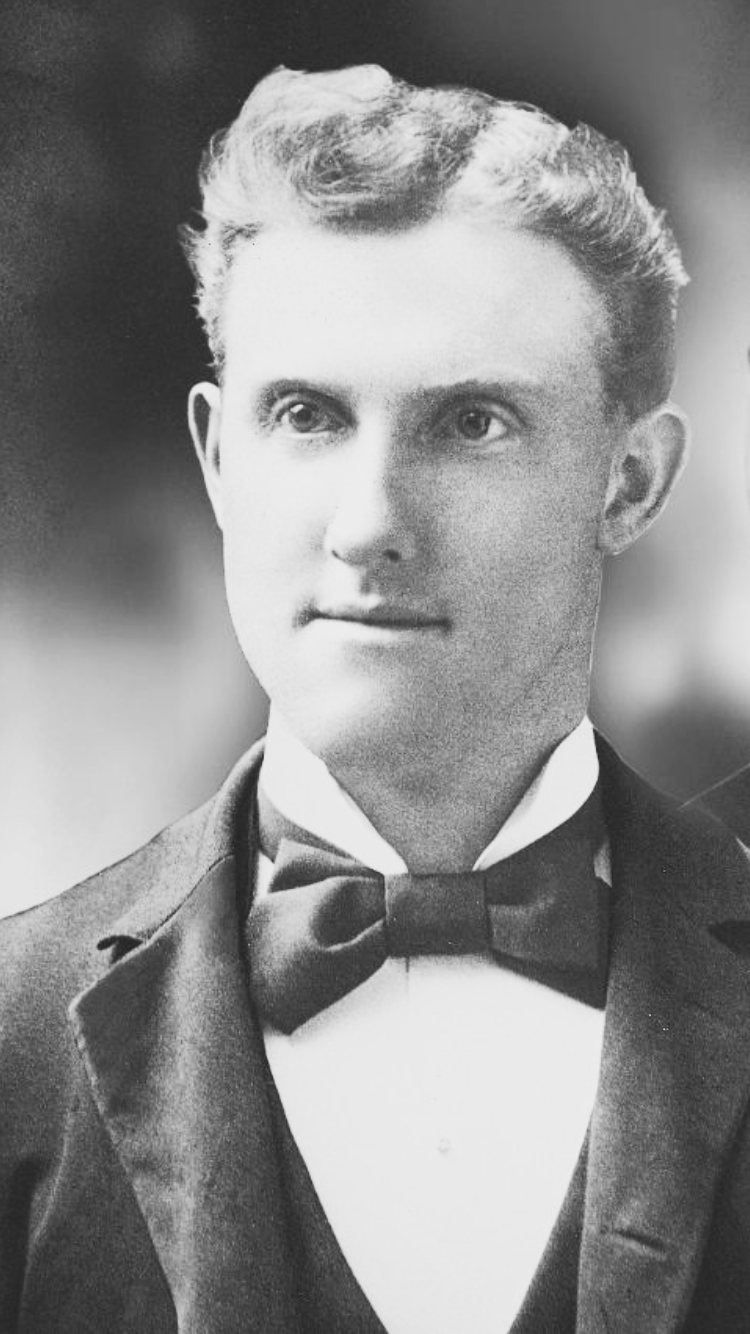
- Burns c. 1900
- Born: October 26, 1871; Waverly, Iowa, United States
- Died: April 1, 1924 (aged 52); Kansas City, Missouri, United States
- Occupations: civil engineer, Business executive

Clinton Sumner Burns (1871–1924) was a prominent civil engineer and business executive who, with Robert Emmett McDonnell, a classmate at Stanford University formed an engineering company under the firm name of Burns & McDonnell. His work involved practically every state in the country, designing water and sewer systems in over five hundred cities as well as being an honorary member of the Sigma Xi.

In 2010, Burns and McDonnell were inducted into the Greater Kansas City Business Hall of Fame.

== Early life and career ==
Clinton Sumner Burns was born at Waverly Iowa on October 26, 1871, the son of Heman Hoit Burns (1842-1917) and Laura Root Burns (1845-1881). His early education was obtained in the public schools at Port Byron NY where he lived with his grandmother and at Cornell University. During this period, he acted in a part-time capacity as Assistant City Engineer of Niagara Falls, New York and working on the Erie Canal and on other State canals. Burns went on to finish his education in civil engineering at Stanford University in 1897. After his graduation, Burns went to Kansas City, Missouri where he entered the employ of the City Park Department under George Kessler.

In 1898, Burns and Robert E McDonnell, a fellow classmate at Stanford University, formed an engineering company under the firm name of Burns and McDonnell.

== Partial bibliography ==
The following is a partial bibliography of works authored or co-authored by Burns.

- "Waterworks appraisals", Engineering Record v 59 p 616 May 15, 1909.
- "Waterworks appraisements in Missouri and Kansas", Engineering News v 62 p 115 July 29, 1909.
- "Determination of physical values", Engineering Record v 52 p 328 September 16, 1905.
- "Valuation of public utilities", Municipal Journal and Engineer v 29 p 744 November 30, 1910.
- "The valuation of public utilities", City Hall Midland Municipalities, v 22 p 50., Nov 1911
- "The Valuation of Public Service Corporation Property", Transactions of the American Society of Civil Engineers, vol. LXXII, June 1911. Burns was a co-author.
- “Final report of the committee on depreciation [with discussion].” Journal (American Water Works Association), vol. 6, no. 1, 1919, pp. 85–135. JSTOR, www.jstor.org/stable/41224506. Accessed December 11, 2020.
- "The Valuation of Sewerage Systems"- Engineering and Contracting, Volume 47, no. 7, page 149. Myron C. Clark Publishing Company, 1917.
- "The Relationship between Finance and Depreciation" American Municipalities, Volume 33, no. 3, page 77 (1917).
- "Sultan Water Supply of Everett Wash". Journal (American Water Works Association), vol. 7, no. 4, 1920, pp. 451–455
- "The Diary of a Young Engineer", The Stanford Illustrated Review, Volume 25, Issue 8. Accessed 12 December 2020

== Patents ==
Burns was awarded two patents in the United States:

- 1259833A-Pipe joints
- 1130885A-Device for flushing toilets on railway coaches

== Death and legacy ==
Burns died on April 1, 1924. He worked in "practically every State in the Union." Burns was also an honorary member of the Sigma Xi having been elected in 1905 from the Stanford University Chapter as well as a member of the American Institute of Consulting Engineers. In 2010, Burns was inducted into the Greater Kansas City Business Hall of Fame along with his partner Robert E McDonnell.

Burns's advice to consulting engineers was to recognize that the

"(C)ompetition will come not from other members of the engineering profession but from land surveyors who claim to be engineers and from the horde of salesmen and representatives of contracting companies who offer to make plans and specifications for practically nothing in consideration for which the interested company is to be given the order for certain or awarded the contract for constructing the plant. Such propositions will never appeal to a good businessman, but unfortunately, an engineer's clients are oftentimes not far-sighted in such matters. The practicing engineer cannot hope to secure much business along this branch of the profession until he has a reputation for absolute honesty untainted commissions or connections with construction companies."

- Stanford Illustrated Review, Volume 25, Issue 8, pg 434.

== Notes ==
- "Profile of a Sustaining Member." The Military Engineer, vol. 76, no. 494, 1984, pp. 318–318. JSTOR, www.jstor.org/stable/44607508. Accessed December 11, 2020.
- The Cornell Civil Engineer, Volume 32, No. 8, page 118.
