= Janine Austin Clayton =

American ophthalmologist

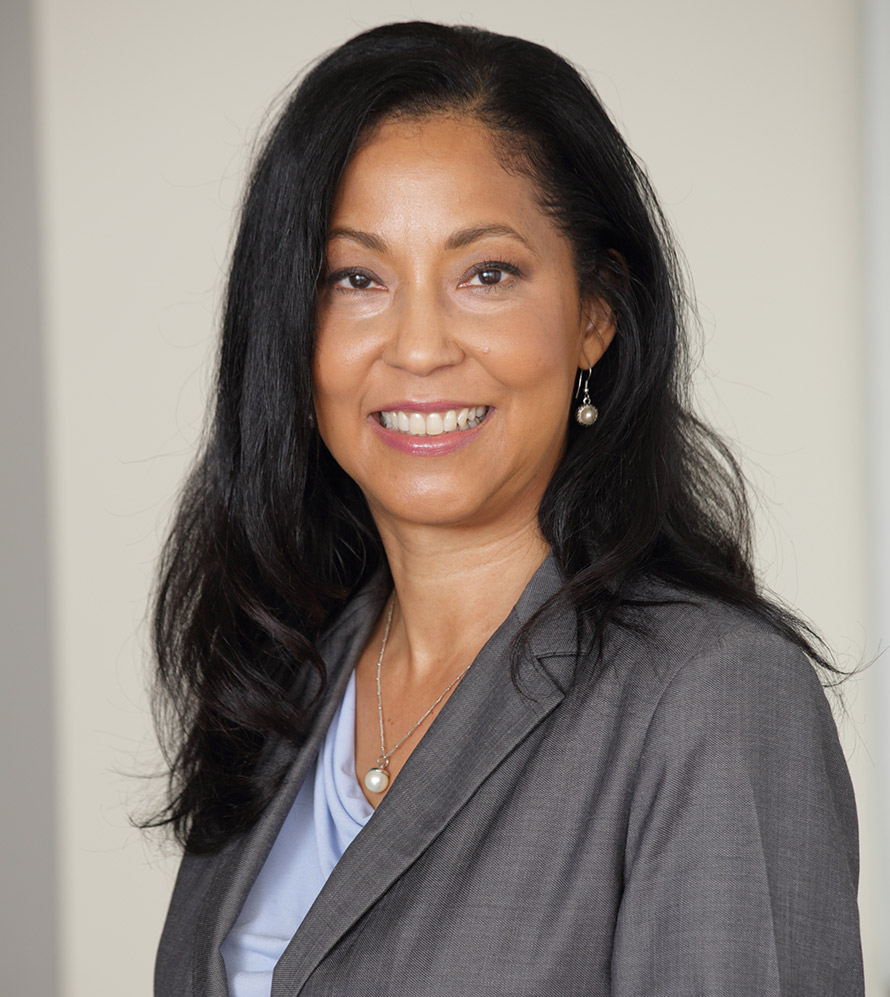
- Born: Washington, D.C., US
- Education: Johns Hopkins University (BA); Howard University College of Medicine (MD)
- Occupation: Opthamologist
- Scientific career
- Fields: Ophthalmology, women's health
- Workplaces: National Institutes of Health

Janine Austin Clayton is an American ophthalmologist. She is the NIH associate director for research on women's health and director of the Office of Women's Health. Clayton was previously the deputy clinical director of the National Eye Institute.

== Early life and education ==
Clayton is a native of Washington, D.C. and attended Catholic school. In 1984, she received an undergraduate degree in natural sciences with honors from Zanvyl Krieger School of Arts and Sciences at Johns Hopkins University. During her undergraduate studies, she took dance classes at Peabody Institute, volunteered at the Johns Hopkins Hospital neonatal unit, and worked for the psychology department. She was a member of Alpha Kappa Alpha. Clayton earned a medical degree from Howard University College of Medicine. She completed a residency in ophthalmology at the VCU Medical Center. Clayton completed fellowship training in cornea and external disease at the Wilmer Eye Institute at Johns Hopkins Hospital and in uveitis and ocular immunology at National Eye Institute (NEI).

== Career ==
Clayton in 2016 explaining SABV in clinical trials

Clayton was the deputy clinical director at NEI. She was appointed associate director for research on women's health at the National Institutes of Health (NIH) and director of the Office of Research on Women's Health at NIH in 2012. Clayton has strengthened NIH support for research on diseases, disorders, and conditions that affect women. She is the architect of the NIH policy requiring scientists to consider sex as a biological variable across the research spectrum, a part of NIH's initiative to enhance reproducibility, rigor, and transparency. As co-chair of the NIH Working Group on Women in Biomedical Careers with NIH Director Francis Collins, Clayton also leads NIH's efforts to advance women in science careers.

=== Research ===
A board-certified ophthalmologist, Clayton's research interests include autoimmune ocular diseases and the role of sex and gender in health and disease. Clayton has a particular interest in ocular surface disease and discovered a novel form of disease associated with premature ovarian insufficiency that affects young women, setting the stage for her interest in rigorous, thoughtful exploration of the role of sex and gender in health and disease. She is the author of more than 80 scientific publications, journal articles, and book chapters. Her clinical research has ranged from randomized controlled trials of novel therapies for immune-mediated ocular diseases to studies on the development of digital imaging techniques for the anterior segment.

== Awards and honors ==
Clayton has received several awards and has been recognized as a leader by her peers. She received the Senior Achievement Award from the Board of Trustees of the American Academy of Ophthalmology in 2008, was selected as a 2010 Silver Fellow by the Association for Research in Vision and Ophthalmology, and won the European Uveitis Patient Interest Association Clinical Uveitis Research Award in 2010. In 2015, she was awarded the American Medical Women's Association Lila A. Wallis Women's Health Award and the Wenger Award for Excellence in Public Service. Clayton was granted the Bernadine Healy Award for Visionary Leadership in Women's Health in 2016. The same year, she was inducted into Johns Hopkins University's Society of Scholars as a distinguished alum. She was also selected as an honoree for the Woman's Day Red Dress Awards and the American Medical Association's Dr. Nathan Davis Awards for Outstanding Government Service in 2017. She was elected a Member of the National Academy of Medicine in 2024.

== Personal life ==
Clayton and her husband, Robert Clayton met their sophomore year at Johns Hopkins University. They dated through the end of the junior years before parting ways. They resumed a long-distance relationship their first year of graduate school. Robert Clayton is a lawyer. He founded a family law firm in Los Angeles in 2000. They married on April 11, 2008, and reside in North Potomac, Maryland.

== Selected works ==
- Clayton, Janine A.; Collins, Francis S. (May 2014). "Policy: NIH to balance sex in cell and animal studies". Nature. 509 (7500): 282–283. doi:10.1038/509282a. ISSN 0028-0836. PMC 5101948. PMID 24834516.
- Clayton, Janine Austin (February 2016). "Studying both sexes: a guiding principle for biomedicine". The FASEB Journal. 30 (2): 519–524. doi:10.1096/fj.15-279554. ISSN 0892-6638. PMC 4714546. PMID 26514164.
- Clayton, Janine Austin; Tannenbaum, Cara (November 2016). "Reporting Sex, Gender, or Both in Clinical Research?". JAMA. 316 (18): 1863–1864. doi:10.1001/jama.2016.16405. ISSN 0098-7484. PMID 27802482.
