= Frank A. Brown Jr. =

Biological rhythms researcher

Frank Arthur Brown Jr.
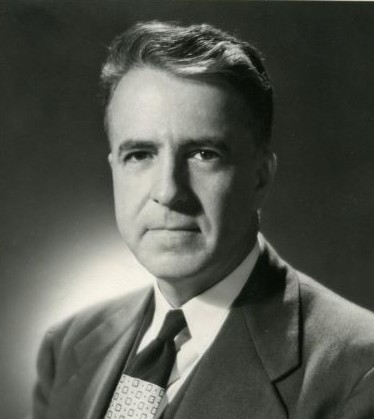
- Frank Arthur Brown, Jr. in 1929
- Born: August 30, 1908; Beverly, Massachusetts
- Died: June 17, 1983 (aged 74); Woods Hole, Massachusetts, United States
- Education: Bowdoin College, Harvard University
- Known for: biological rhythms, physiological ecology of marine invertebrates
- Scientific career
- Fields: Comparative physiology
- Workplaces: Northwestern University, Marine Biological Laboratory
- Thesis: Color Changes in Crustaceans with Special Reference to Palaemonetes
- Doctoral advisor: George Howard Parker
- Doctoral students: Grover C. Stephens

Frank Arthur Brown Jr. (1908–1983) was a leading mid-20th century researcher of biological rhythms. He was a professor of biological sciences at Northwestern University and trustee of the Marine Biological Laboratory in Woods Hole, Massachusetts.

== Biography ==
Frank Arthur Brown Jr. was born 30 August 1908 in Beverly, Massachusetts to Frank A. Brown, Sr. and Arletta Esten (Robinson) Brown. The elder Frank A. Brown (1876–1962) was an accomplished artist known for portraiture and Middle Eastern scenes from North Africa. Frank Brown Jr. attended Bowdoin College earning his bachelor's degree in 1929, and Harvard University for his graduate studies, earning his Ph.D. in 1934. He spent his professional career as a professor of biological sciences at Northwestern University, conducting his summer season research at the Marine Biological Laboratory in Woods Hole, Massachusetts. He was married to Jennie Pettegrove (1913–2006) of Machiasport, Maine, and he died on 19 May 1983 at their home in Woods Hole.

== Research ==
Brown's early work as a junior faculty member at Northwestern University included investigations into color perception by fish. He did extensive work with the Fiddler Crab, Uca, finding that they showed both lunar day and solar day rhythms. In other studies he found that a wide variety of organisms displayed responses to gravitational, magnetic and electrical fields leading him to propose exogenous factors as controllers of biological rhythms.

His work and ideas ran counter to the prevailing trend in chronobiology at the time, which was focused on the development of the endogenous and bio-chemical model of the circadian clock. Brown envisioned the biological clock as being a duality in which an internal responder to subtle information from the environment is overlain by an endogenous timing mechanism.

Brown's research program which diverged from the mainstream, was ignored by his peers. A paper published in Science magazine in 1957 criticised a methodology of finding cycles with environmental fluctuations, was believed to be at least partly directed at Brown. Eight years later, a physiologist and mathematician named A. Heuser published a paper criticising that paper's methodology.

Brown continued to study rhythms up to his death in a series of experiments documented in published scientific papers on correlations with magnetic fields, gamma rays and other subtle signals in the natural environment. Later discoveries, such as magnetotactic bacteria, and homing and navigation in birds and turtles, confirmed his recognition of reception of geomagnetic fields in organisms.

== Selected publications ==
- G.H. Parker, F.A. Brown Jr. and J.M. Odiorne. 1935. The relation of the eyes to chromatophoral activities. Proceedings of the American Academy of Arts and Sciences 69(12):439–462
- Frank A. Brown Jr. and G.C. Stephens. 1951. Studies on the daily rhythmicity of the fiddler crab, Uca. Modification by photoperiod. Biological Bulletin 101:71–83.
- Frank A. Brown Jr. 1954. "Persistent Activity Rhythms in the Oyster," American Journal of Physiology 178(3): 510–514. https://doi.org/10.1152/ajplegacy.1954.178.3.510
- Frank A. Brown, J. Woodland Hastings, John D. Palmer. The Biological Clock. Two Views. Academic Press. 1970.
- Frank A. Brown Jr. The "Clocks" Timing Biological Rhythms: Recent discoveries suggest that the mysterious biological clock phenomenon results from a continuous interaction between organisms and the subtle geophysical environment. American Scientist, Vol. 60, No. 6 (November–December 1972), pp. 756–766.
- Frank A. Brown. Biological clocks: Endogenous cycles synchronized by subtle geophysical rhythms. Biosystems. August 1976 8(2):67-8.1
- Frank A. Brown Jr. 1983. The Biological Clock Phenomenon: Exogenous Timing Hypothesis. J. interdiscipl. Cycle Res., Vol. 14, number 2, pp. 137·162.
