= Edward Laurens Mark =

American zoologist (1847–1946)

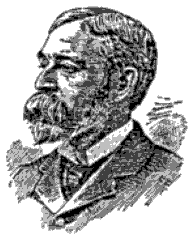
- Born: May 30, 1847; Hamlet, New York
- Died: December 16, 1946 (aged 99); Cambridge, Massachusetts
- Education: University of Michigan, Leipzig University
- Scientific career
- Fields: Zoology, Anatomy
- Workplaces: Harvard University
- Doctoral advisor: Rudolf Leuckart
- Doctoral students: Thomas Barbour, George Howard Parker, William Emerson Ritter, Alfred G. Mayer, William Rees Brebner Robertson.

Edward Laurens Mark (May 30, 1847 – December 16, 1946) was an American zoologist, Hersey Professor of Anatomy and Director of the Zoological Laboratory of the Museum of Comparative Zoology (MCZ) at Harvard University. In his landmark cytological monograph published in 1881, Mark conceived parenthetical referencing for citations, also known as Harvard referencing.

== Biography ==
Edward Laurens Mark was born in Hamlet, New York on May 30, 1847.

Mark received the degree A.B. in 1871 from the University of Michigan. After service as astronomer of the United States Northwest Boundary Survey, in 1873 he travelled to Europe, becoming the first American to obtain a doctorate in the laboratory of Rudolf Leuckart; receiving his Ph.D. in Zoology from the University of Leipzig in 1876. Bringing the cytological and histological approach with him to Harvard University in 1877, he was responsible for the introduction of advanced European microscopic techniques. He became assistant professor of zoology in 1883 and Hersey professor of anatomy in 1885, a position he held until his retirement in 1921. Elected Fellow of the American Academy of Arts and Sciences in 1885, he was one of the scientists and financial benefactors who founded The Bermuda Biological Station for Research in 1903; location of the Bermuda Institute of Ocean Sciences. He received the honorary degree of LL.D. from the University of Michigan in 1896 and from the University of Wisconsin in 1904.

Continuing under the period of Mark's leadership, Harvard's Museum of Comparative Zoology became the major American centre for training research scholars in zoology; especially comparative embryology and later, comparative evolutionary embryology. After completing their doctorates, graduates of Mark’s laboratory dispersed across the United States having a profound effect on the progress of American zoology. They were research oriented and brought with them a research agenda grounded in comparative zoology and comparative evolutionary embryology. Mark's students accepted academic appointments at universities and scientific institutions, founded or expanded natural history museums, founded marine laboratories, and contributed lasting scientific research legacies. Among his notable students were Thomas Barbour, George Howard Parker, William Emerson Ritter, and William Rees Brebner Robertson.

A prolific author, elected to the National Academy of Sciences in 1903, Mark was known for his insistence on orderliness, accuracy of detail, and attention to bibliographic data; setting a high standard for research and publications in America. Loyal to his students, "he followed their triumphs and reverses with a kindly human interest." Through expressions of extraordinary gratitude, including from Theodore Roosevelt, Mark's students contributed original papers to the 1903 Festschrift Mark Anniversary Volume, celebrating his 25 years of success in the advancement of zoology. Mark was elected to the American Philosophical Society in 1907.

He died at his home in Cambridge, Massachusetts on December 16, 1946.
