= George Howard Parker =

American zoologist (1864–1955)

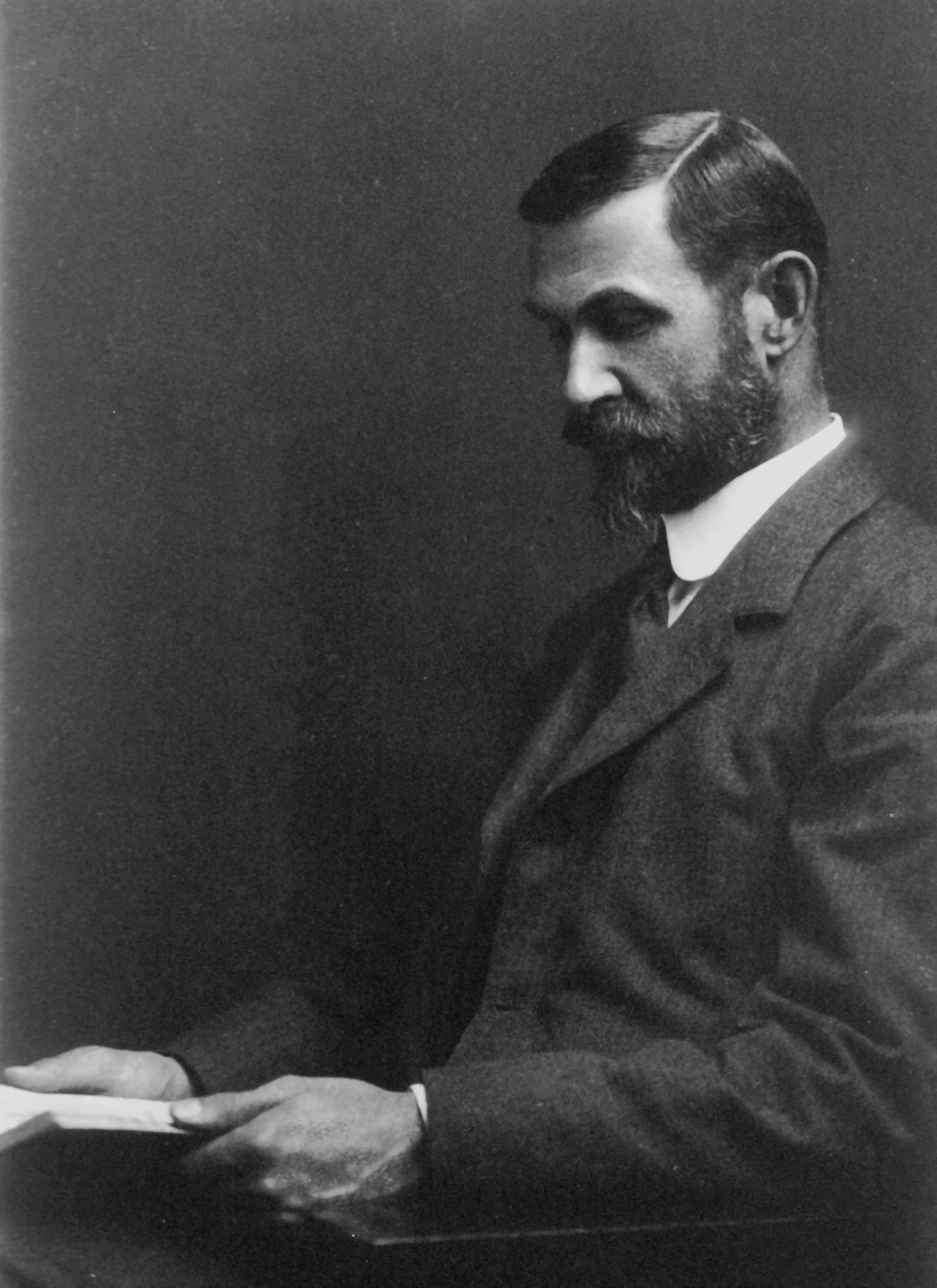
- George Howard Parker ca. 1895
- Born: December 23, 1864; Philadelphia, Pennsylvania, U.S.
- Died: March 26, 1955 (aged 90); Cambridge, Massachusetts
- Education: Harvard
- Awards: Daniel Giraud Elliot Medal
- Scientific career
- Fields: Physiology, Zoology
- Workplaces: Harvard University
- Thesis: The Compound Eyes in Crustaceans (1891)
- Doctoral advisor: Edward Laurens Mark
- Doctoral students: Frank A. Brown, Jr.; William Harper Cole; Selig Hecht

George Howard Parker (December 23, 1864 – March 26, 1955) was an American zoologist. He was a professor at Harvard, and investigated the anatomy and physiology of sense organs and animal reactions.

== Biography ==
George Howard Parker was born in Philadelphia on 23 Dec 1864. He graduated from Harvard in 1887 with his undergraduate degree, later pursuing special courses there and at the universities of Leipzig, Berlin and Freiburg. He became assistant instructor in zoology at Harvard in 1888 and occupied different positions there, earning his Ph.D. in 1891 and becoming professor of zoology in 1906.

He was Fellow of the American Academy of Arts and Sciences, a member of the National Academy of Sciences, and also of the American Philosophical Society.

For his work "Do Melanophore Nerves Show Antidromic Responses?" in the Journal of General Physiology, Parker was awarded the Daniel Giraud Elliot Medal in 1937 by the National Academy of Sciences. He was William Brewster Clark lecturer at Amherst College in 1914 and in that year was sent by the United States Government to investigate the Pribilof seal herd.

== Selected publications ==
- G.H. Parker. 1904. Olfactory reactions of Fishes. Journal of Experimental Zoology 8(4):535-542.
- G.H. Parker. 1908. The sensory reactions of Amphioxus. Proceedings of the American Academy of Arts and Sciences 43(16):415-455.
- W.H. Osgood, E.A. Preble, G.H. Parker, and R.M.E. MacDonald. 1915. The Fur Seals and Other Life of the Pribilof Islands, Alaska, in 1914. U.S. Government Printing Office, Washington, D.C. 172pp.
- George Howard Parker. 1932. Humoral Agents in Nervous Activity: With Special Reference to Chromatophores. Cambridge University Press. 79pp.
- G.H. Parker, F.A. Brown Jr. and J.M. Odiorne. 1935. The relation of the eyes to chromatophoral activities. Proceedings of the American Academy of Arts and Sciences 69(12):439-462
