= Grover C. Stephens =

American marine biologist (1925–2003)

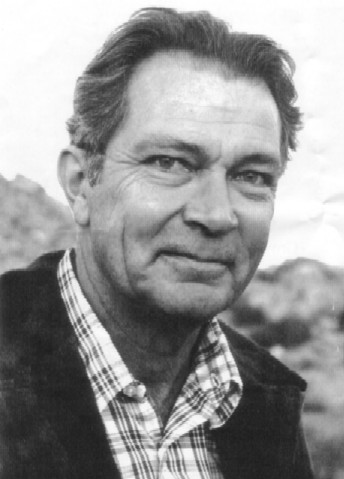
- Grover C. Stephens, Jr. (1925-2003)
- Born: January 12, 1925; Oak Park, Illinois, US
- Died: June 17, 2003 (aged 78); Costa Mesa, California, United States
- Education: Northwestern University
- Known for: physiological ecology of marine invertebrates
- Scientific career
- Fields: Comparative physiology
- Workplaces: Marine Biological Laboratory, University of Minnesota, University of California, Irvine
- Thesis: The Control of Cement Gland Development in the Crayfish, "Cambarus"
- Doctoral advisor: Frank A. Brown, Jr.
- Doctoral students: Paul K. Chien, Michael A. Rice, Patricia A. Wheeler, Stephen H. Wright

Grover Cleveland Stephens, Jr. (January 12, 1925 – June 17, 2003), was an American marine biologist and comparative physiologist at the University of Minnesota and the University of California, Irvine.

== Early life, military service, and education ==
Stephens was born 12 Jan 1925 in Oak Park, Illinois, to Grover C. and Celene Madeleine (Seibert) Stephens, and grew up in Cicero, Illinois, attending J. Sterling Morton High School East. He entered military service on 13 Nov 1943 and trained at the Great Lakes Naval Station. After one year of engineering training at Purdue University and Princeton University, he was commissioned as an ensign in the U.S. Navy in the spring of 1945 and assigned as a gunnery officer on the USS Philippine Sea, which was commissioned after VJ-Day. He was released from active duty in the Navy in 1946, and after completing his remaining college course work, graduated from Northwestern University with a B.A. in mathematics in 1948. He earned an M.A. in philosophy at Northwestern University in 1949, and after working in the laboratory of Frank A. Brown at Northwestern University and the Marine Biological Laboratory (MBL) at Woods Hole, Massachusetts during the summers, he earned his Ph.D. in physiology in 1952.

== Academic career ==
Stephens began his academic career teaching at Brooklyn College (1952–53), after which he joined the faculty of the University of Minnesota (UM) in September 1953. During his eleven years at UM, most of his research was done at MBL, where he worked on the daily rhythms of color change of fiddler crabs. Some of his most important work during this time period was his 1957 discovery, along with Robert A. Schinske, of the ability of soft-bodied marine invertebrates to take up amino acids and other small-organic molecules directly from seawater. This discovery was important in broadening our understanding of how many marine invertebrates feed and how energy and nutrients flow through marine ecosystems.

In 1964, Stephens joined the faculty of the University of California, Irvine (UCI) as the founding chairman of the Department of Organismic Biology. While at UCI, he spent his career refining and expanding his findings of amino acid uptake by invertebrates, conclusively showing that bacteria were not involved in the process, and that the process was a significant supplementary source of nutrition for many animals. He served as the fourth dean of the College of Biological Sciences at UCI from 1982 to 1986 succeeding Howard A. Schneiderman. A man of varied talents, he was a good athlete and proficient amateur pianist occasionally performing as an accompanist for vocal artists at the university. Stephens retired from the university in 1991, but continued to be an active participant in campus activities until his death on 17 June 2003.

== Selected publications ==
- Brown, F.A. Jr. and G.C. Stephens. 1951. Studies on the daily rhythmicity of the fiddler crab, Uca. Modification by photoperiod. Biological Bulletin 101:71-83.
- Stephens, G.C. 1955. Induction of molting in the crayfish, Cambarus, by modification of daily photoperiod. Biological Bulletin 108:235-241.
- Stephens, G.C. and R.A. Schinske. 1961. Uptake of amino acids by marine invertebrates. Limnology and Oceanography 6(2):175-181.
- Stephens, G.C. 1975. Uptake of naturally occurring primary amines by marine annelids. Biological Bulletin 149:397-407.
- Stephens, G.C. 1982. Recent progress in the study of "Die Ernährung der Wassertiere und der Stoffhaushalt der Gewasser". American Zoologist 22(3):611-619.
- Manahan, D.T., S.H. Wright, G.C. Stephens and M.A. Rice. 1982. Transport of dissolved amino acids by the mussel, Mytilus edulis: Demonstration of net uptake from seawater by HPLC analysis. Science 215:1253-1255.
- Manahan, D.T., S.H. Wright, and G.C. Stephens. 1983. Simultaneous determination of net uptake of 16 amino acids by a marine bivalve. American Journal of Physiology, Regulatory Integrative and Comparative Physiology 244:R832-R838
- Davis, J.P. and G.C. Stephens. 1984. Uptake of free amino acids by bacteria-free larvae of the sand dollar Dendraster excentricus. American Journal of Physiology, Regulatory Integrative and Comparative Physiology 247: R733-R739
- Stephens, G.C. 1988. Epidermal uptake of amino acids in marine invertebrates: Mechanisms and studies of specificity. Biochimica et Biophysica Acta 947:113-138.

== Personal life ==
Stephens was first married on 14 January 1949 to biologist Gwen Maxine Jones and they had three sons: physicist Peter Wesley Stephens (1951- ) an emeritus professor of physics at SUNY Stony Brook, John D. Stephens (1957-), and Joseph Henry Stephens (1960–1992). Stephens married Ann C. Doyle on 11 June 1977, and they resided in Newport Beach, California, until his death in 2003.

== See also ==
- Comparative Physiology
