= Harry Snyder (scientist) =

American agricultural scientist

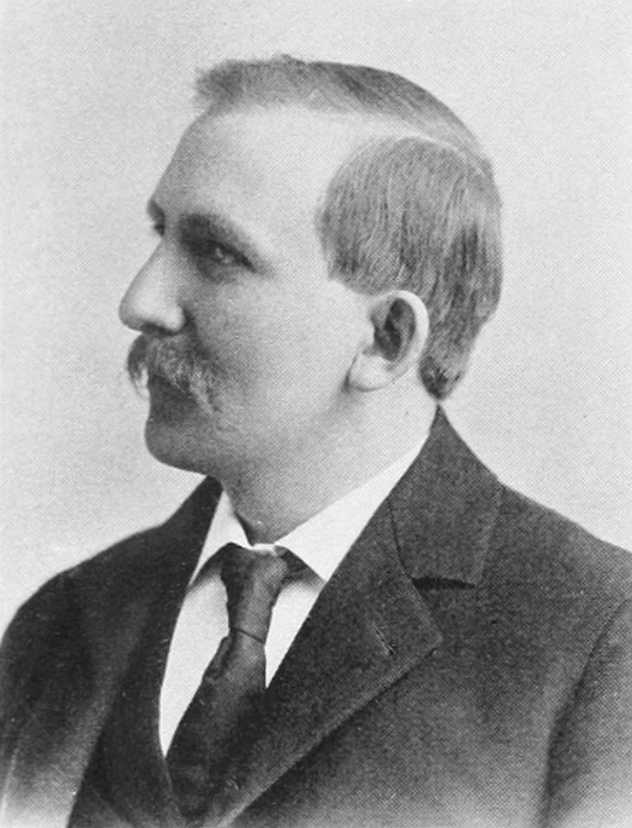
- Born: January 26, 1867; Cherry Valley, New York
- Died: October 11, 1927 (aged 60); Minneapolis, Minnesota
- Education: Cornell University
- Occupation: Agricultural scientist
- Spouse: Adelaide Churchill Craig (m. 1890)

Harry Snyder (1867–1927) was an American agricultural scientist, a specialist in agricultural chemistry.

== Biography ==
Harry Snyder was born in Cherry Valley, New York on January 26, 1867. He earned a B.S. from Cornell University in 1889, where he was subsequently instructor of chemistry for two years. Snyder joined the Agricultural Experiment Station at the University of Minnesota in 1891 as a chemist, and in 1892 became professor of agricultural chemistry. He became professor of agricultural chemistry and soils in 1907. He left his professorship for industry in 1909 to become the chief chemist for the Russell-Miller Milling Company in Minneapolis.

He married Adelaide Churchill Craig in 1890.

Snyder died at his home in Minneapolis on October 11, 1927.

Snyder Hall, constructed in 1938 as the agricultural biochemistry building at the university, was named after him on the University of Minnesota St. Paul Campus. It is now the headquarters for the University of Minnesota College of Biological Sciences. He was President of the Sigma Xi Chapter there from 1907-08.

== Bibliography ==
Among his major publications were his books:

- Snyder, H (1897), The chemistry of dairying an outline of the chemical and allied changes which take place in milk, and in the manufacture of butter and cheese; and the rational feeding of dairy stock, Easton, Pa: Chemical Pub., OCLC 15242923
- Snyder, H. (1899), The chemistry of soils and fertilizers, Easton, Pa: The Chemical Pub., OCLC 3138267
- Snyder, H. (1903), The chemistry of plant and animal life, New York: The Macmillan company, OCLC 3859743

He also wrote many papers, including:

- Snyder, Harry (1908), "Influence of fertilizers upon the composition of wheat", Journal of the American Chemical Society, 30 (4): 604–608, doi:10.1021/ja01946a012
- Snyder, Harry (1905), "Testing wheat flour for commercial purposes", Journal of the American Chemical Society, 27 (9): 1068–1074, doi:10.1021/ja01987a005
- Snyder, Harry (1904), "The determination of gliadin in wheat flour by means of the polariscope", Journal of the American Chemical Society, 26 (3): 263–266, doi:10.1021/ja01993a004
- Snyder, H. (1904), "The water-soluble plant food of soils", Science, 19 (491): 0834–0835, Bibcode:1904Sci....19..834S, doi:10.1126/science.19.491.834, PMID 17754148

Snyder wrote numerous Department of Agriculture Bulletins, including United States Department of Agriculture Bulletins Nos. 67, 85, 101, 126, 143, 156, on the digestibility of bread. He also was the writer of many technical articles for the Encyclopædia Britannica.
