= Robertsonian translocation =

Chromosomal abnormality

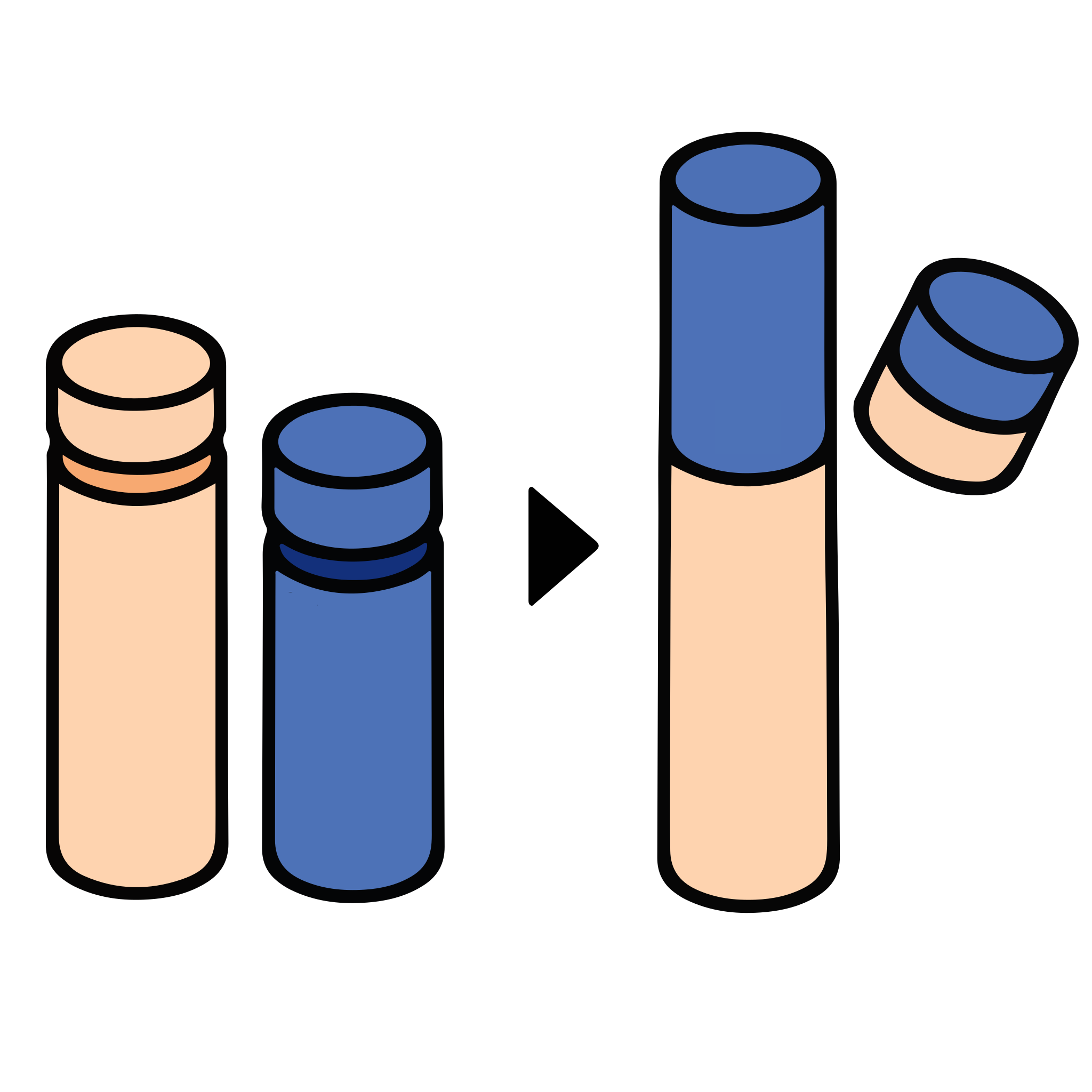
A Robertsonian translocation. The short arms of the chromosomes (shown on right) are often lost

Robertsonian translocation (ROB) is a chromosomal abnormality where the entire long arms of two different chromosomes become fused to each other. It is the most common form of chromosomal translocation in humans, affecting 1 out of every 1,000 babies born. It does not usually cause medical problems, though some people may produce gametes with an incorrect number of chromosomes, resulting in a risk of miscarriage. In rare cases, this translocation results in Down syndrome and Patau syndrome. Robertsonian translocations result in a reduction in the number of chromosomes. A Robertsonian evolutionary fusion, which may have occurred in the common ancestor of humans and other great apes, is the reason humans have 46 chromosomes while all other extant primates have 48. Detailed DNA studies of chimpanzee, orangutan, gorilla, and bonobo apes has determined that where human chromosome 2 is present in our DNA in all four great apes this is split into two separate chromosomes typically numbered 2a and 2b. Similarly, the fact that horses have 64 chromosomes and donkeys 62, and that they can still have common, albeit usually infertile, offspring, may be due to a Robertsonian evolutionary fusion at some point in the descent of today's donkeys from their common ancestor.

== Mechanism ==
Chromosome arms can have different length ratios. Robertsonian translocation occurs in acrocentric chromosome pairs (number II in the image), where the short arms are fairly short but not very short. A: Short arm (p arm) B: Centromere C: Long arm (q arm) D: Sister chromatids

All chromosomes in animals have a long arm (known as q) and a short arm (known as p), separated by a region called the centromere. Robertsonian translocations can only occur between chromosomes which have the centromere very close to one end. This means these chromosomes have a long arm which is particularly long, and a short arm which is particularly short. These are known as acrocentric chromosomes. Humans have five of these acrocentric chromosomes: 13, 14, 15, 21 and 22. When these chromosomes break at their centromeres, the two resulting long arms may fuse. The result is a single, large chromosome with a metacentric centromere. This form of rearrangement is a Robertsonian translocation.

Robertsonian translocations may arise during meiosis I when the short arms of acrocentric chromosomes cluster together in the nucleolus. This clustering, mediated by the nucleolus organizer region present on the short arms, brings non-homologous chromosomes into close physical proximity at a time of high levels of DNA double-strand break formation and recombination.

This type of translocation may involve homologous (paired) or non-homologous chromosomes. Owing to the acrocentric nature of the chromosomes involved, the long arms of these chromosomes contain the majority of genetic material contained on the original chromosomes. The short arms also join to form a smaller reciprocal product, which typically contains only nonessential genes also present elsewhere in the genome, and is usually lost within a few cell divisions. This type of translocation is cytologically visible, and can reduce chromosome number (in humans, from 23 to 22). However, the smaller chromosome carries so few essential genes that its loss is usually clinically insignificant.

== Consequences ==
In humans, when a Robertsonian translocation joins the long arm of chromosome 21 with the long arm of chromosomes 14 or 15, the heterozygous carrier is phenotypically normal because there are two copies of all major chromosome arms and hence two copies of all essential genes. However, the progeny of this carrier may inherit an unbalanced trisomy 21, causing Down syndrome.

A Robertsonian translocation in balanced form results in no excess or deficit of genetic material and causes no health difficulties. In unbalanced forms, Robertsonian translocations cause chromosomal deletions or addition and result in syndromes of multiple malformations, including trisomy 13 (Patau syndrome) and trisomy 21 (Down syndrome). The most frequent forms of Robertsonian translocations are between chromosomes 13 and 14, 14 and 21, and 14 and 15.

A Robertsonian translocation results when the long arms of two acrocentric chromosomes fuse at the centromere and the two short arms are lost. If, for example, the long arms of chromosomes 13 and 14 fuse, no significant genetic material is lost—and the person is completely normal in spite of the translocation. Common Robertsonian translocations are confined to the acrocentric chromosomes 13, 14, 15, 21 and 22, because the short arms of these chromosomes encode for rRNA which is present in multiple copies.

Most people with Robertsonian translocations have only 45 chromosomes in each of their cells, yet all essential genetic material is present, and they appear normal. Their children, however, may either be normal, carry the fusion chromosome (depending which chromosome is represented in the gamete), or they may inherit a missing or extra long arm of an acrocentric chromosome (phenotype affected). Genetic counseling and genetic testing is offered to families that may be carriers of chromosomal translocations.

Rarely, the same translocation may be present homozygously if heterozygous parents with the same Robertsonian translocation have children. The result may be viable offspring with 44 chromosomes. Outside of humans, Przewalski's horse has 66 chromosomes, while both of domesticated horses and the tarpan have 64 chromosomes and donkeys have 62; it is thought that the difference is due to a Robertsonian translocation.

== Nomenclature ==
Human karyotype with annotated bands and sub-bands as used for the nomenclature of chromosome abnormalities. It shows dark and white regions as seen on G banding. Each row is vertically aligned at centromere level. It shows 22 homologous autosomal chromosome pairs, both the female (XX) and male (XY) versions of the two sex chromosomes, as well as the mitochondrial genome (at bottom left).

The International System for Human Cytogenomic Nomenclature (ISCN) is an international standard for human chromosome nomenclature, which includes band names, symbols and abbreviated terms used in the description of human chromosome and chromosome abnormalities. Abbreviations include rob for Robertsonian translocations. For example, rob(21;21)(q10;q10) causes Down syndrome.

== Name ==
Robertsonian translocations are named after the American zoologist and cytogeneticist William Rees Brebner Robertson (1881–1941) who first described a Robertsonian translocation in grasshoppers in 1916. They are also called whole-arm translocations or centric-fusion translocations.
