= Anne Fausto-Sterling =

American sexologist (born 1944)

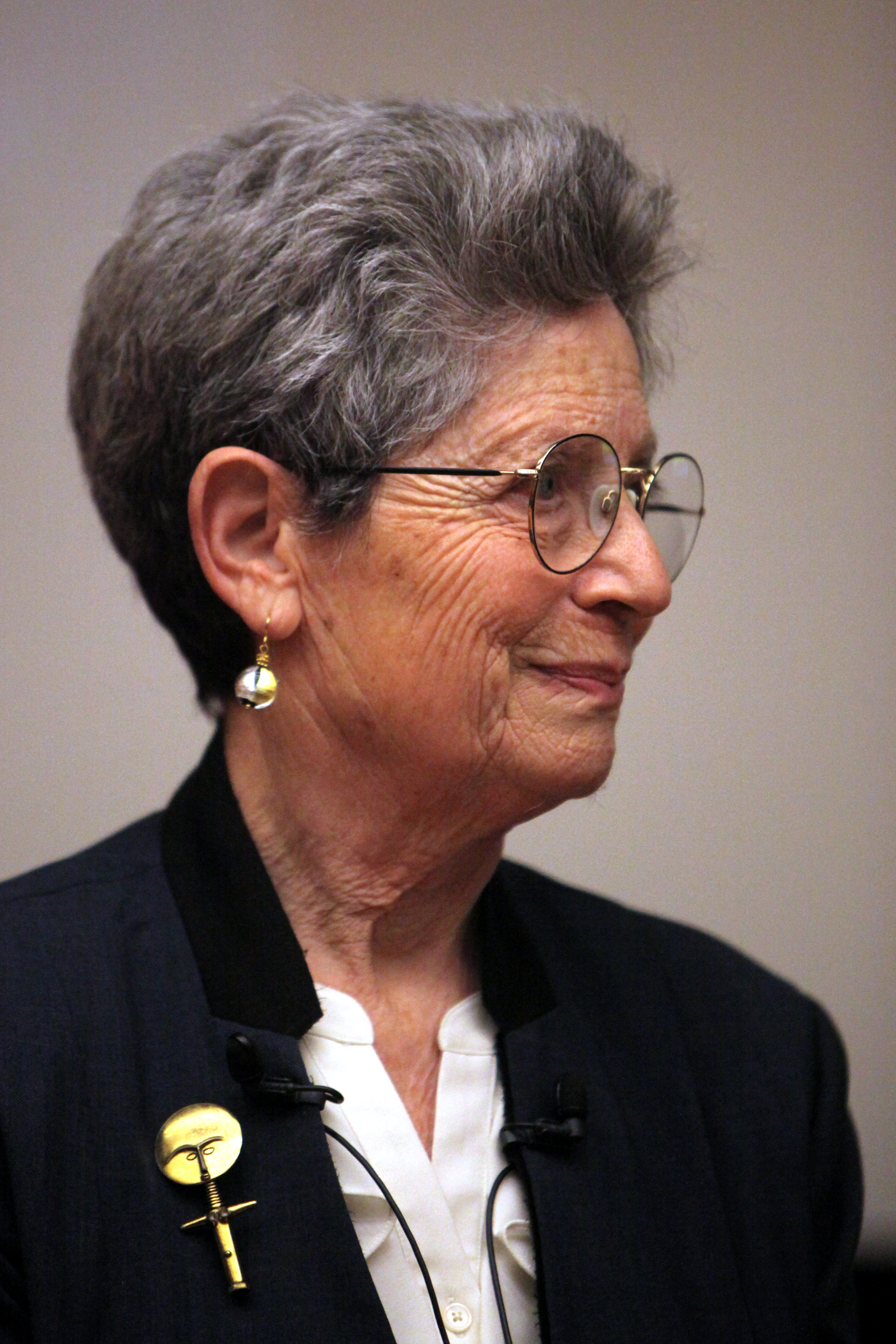
- Fausto-Sterling in 2019
- Born: Anne Sterling; July 30, 1944 (age 82); New York City, U.S.
- Education: University of Wisconsin (BA); Brown University (PhD)
- Spouse: Paula Vogel (m. 2004)
- Scientific career
- Fields: Biology; Women's studies
- Workplaces: Brown University
- Writing career
- Notable work: Sexing the Body (2000)

Anne Fausto-Sterling (née Sterling; born July 30, 1944) is an American sexologist who has written extensively on the social construction of gender, sexual identity, gender identity, gender roles, and intersexuality. She is the Nancy Duke Lewis Professor Emerita of Biology and Gender Studies at Brown University.

== Life and career ==
Fausto-Sterling's mother, Dorothy Sterling, was a noted writer and historian while her father was also a published writer. Fausto-Sterling received her Bachelor of Arts degree in zoology from the University of Wisconsin in 1965 and her Ph.D. in developmental genetics from Brown University in 1970. After earning her Ph.D. she joined the faculty of Brown, where she was appointed Nancy Duke Lewis Professor of Biology and Gender Studies.

In a 1993 paper titled "The Five Sexes", Fausto-Sterling laid out a thought experiment considering an alternative model of gender containing five sexes: male, female, merm, ferm, and herm. She later said that the paper "had intended to be provocative, but I had also written with tongue firmly in cheek".

Fausto-Sterling has written two books intended for a general audience. The first of those books, Myths of Gender, was first published in 1985. Her second book for the general public is Sexing the Body: Gender Politics and the Construction of Sexuality, published in 2000. In the book she sets out to "convince readers of the need for theories that allow for a good deal of human variation and that integrate the analytical powers of the biological and the social into the systematic analysis of human development."

Fausto-Sterling married Paula Vogel, a Yale professor and Pulitzer-winning playwright, in 2004. She has served on the editorial board of the journal Perspectives in Biology and Medicine and on the advisory board of the feminist academic journal Signs. She retired from Brown University in 2014, after 44 years on the faculty.

== Reception ==
Historian of science Evelynn M. Hammonds describes Fausto-Sterling as one of the most influential feminist scientists of her generation. Reviewing Myths of Gender in the Los Angeles Times, Elaine Kendall writes that "Her most dramatic and valuable chapters concentrate upon the lingering educational misapprehensions operating to keep women away from the 'hard' sciences and out of such lucrative fields as engineering, sidetracking them instead into lower-paying careers in the humanities or the 'nurturant' professions." Publishers Weekly describes Fausto-Sterling's work as "insightful", stating that Sexing the Body "offers profound challenges to scientific research, the creation of social policy and the future of feminist and gender theory."

Fausto-Sterling's sexual continuum argument has not gained the same prominence in the biological sciences as it has in gender studies. French anthropologist Priscille Touraille called Fausto-Sterling an isolated case which has failed to create a consensus or controversy among biologists. Physician and psychologist Leonard Sax criticized Fausto-Sterling's theory of a sexual continuum. He also argued that her claim that around 1.7% of births are intersex is incorrect, because most of the conditions she considered intersex are not considered intersex from a clinical perspective. Philosopher of science David N. Stamos has criticized Fausto-Sterling's theory of a sexual continuum, arguing that sex is defined by gamete type. Fausto-Sterling has described these modern definitions of intersexuality as a historically recent innovation aimed at defining intersexuality out of existence.

The psychologist Suzanne Kessler, in her book Lessons from the Intersexed, criticized Fausto-Sterling's analysis in "The Five Sexes" because it "still gives genitals [...] primary signifying status and ignores the fact that in the everyday world gender attributions are made without access to genital inspection." Kessler further commented that "What has primacy in everyday life is the gender that is performed, regardless of the flesh's configuration under the clothes." In a later paper titled "The Five Sexes, Revisited", Fausto-Sterling wrote that she now agreed with Kessler's objections to the five-sex theory, and believed that sexual diversity might instead fit into a broader picture of possibilities for each social gender.

The founding of the Intersex Society of North America (ISNA) was announced in response to Fausto-Sterling's 1993 writings about intersex traits, and the ISNA's successor organization, interACT, cites her estimate of intersex prevalence.

== Publications ==
=== Books ===
- Myths of Gender: Biological Theories About Women and Men (2nd ed.). New York: Basic Books. 1992. ISBN 0-465-04792-0.
- Sexing the Body: Gender Politics and the Construction of Sexuality. New York: Basic Books. 2000. ISBN 0-465-07714-5.
- Sex/Gender: Biology in a Social World. New York: Routledge. 2012. ISBN 978-0-415-88145-6.

=== Book chapters ===
- Fausto-Sterling, Anne (2014). "Nature". In Stimpson, Catherine R.; Herdt, Gilbert (eds.). Critical Terms for the Study of Gender. University of Chicago Press. pp. 294–315. doi:10.13140/2.1.3621.3129. ISBN 978-0-2260-1021-2 – via ResearchGate.

== See also ==
- Feminist sexology
