= Donal T. Manahan =

American marine scientist and physiologist (born 1953

- Born: October 15, 1953 (age 72); Republic of Ireland
- Education: University of Wales
- Known for: physiological ecology of marine invertebrates; polar research
- Scientific career
- Fields: Comparative physiology, Marine ecology
- Workplaces: University of Southern California
- Doctoral advisor: Dennis J. Crisp
- Other academic advisors: Grover C. Stephens

Donal Thomas Manahan (b. 15 Oct 1953) is an Irish-born American marine scientist and comparative physiologist. He is known for Antarctic and deep oceanic research on the physiology and ecology of marine invertebrates and their larvae in extreme environments, and for his interest in the role of dissolved organic material as a larval food source.

== Education and career ==
Donal Manahan was educated at Trinity College Dublin and the University of Wales where he earned his Ph.D. studying in the laboratory of Dennis J. Crisp. From 1980 to 1983, he was a post-doctoral fellow in the laboratory of Grover C. Stephens at the University of California, Irvine. Manahan joined faculty at the University of Southern California in 1983.

Manahan has served as Chairman of the National Academy of Sciences's Polar Research Board and he served on the National Science Foundation (NSF) Decadal Group-Planning Committee for Ocean Sciences (2000). He has also served on NSF Federal Advisory Committees to the Director from NSF's Office of Polar Programs. Manahan Peak in Antarctica was named in honor of his contributions to research and education on that continent.

== Selected publications ==
- Manahan, D.T. and D.J. Crisp. 1982. The role of dissolved organic material in the nutrition of pelagic larvae: Amino acid uptake by bivalve veligers. American Zoologist 22: 635-646.
- Manahan, D.T., S.H. Wright, G.C. Stephens and M.A. Rice. 1982. Transport of dissolved amino acids by the mussel, Mytilus edulis: Demonstration of net uptake from seawater by HPLC analysis. Science 215:1253-1255.
- Manahan, D.T., S.H. Wright, and G.C. Stephens. 1983. Simultaneous determination of net uptake of 16 amino acids by a marine bivalve. American Journal of Physiology, Regulatory Integrative and Comparative Physiology 244:R832-R838
- Jaeckle, W. and D.T. Manahan. 1989. Amino acid uptake and metabolism by larvae of the marine worm Urechis caupo (Echiura), a new species in axenic culture. Biological Bulletin 176:317-326.
- Manahan, D.T. 1990. Adaptations by invertebrate larvae for nutrient acquisition from sea water. American Zoologist 30:147-160.
- Marsh, A.G., L.S. Mullineaux, C.M. Young, and D.T. Manahan. 2001. Larval dispersal potential of the tubeworm Riftia pachyptila at deep-sea hydrothermal vents. Nature 411:77-80.
- Pace, D.A., A.G Marsh, P.K. Leong, A.J. Green, D. Hedgecock, and D.T. Manahan. 2006. Physiological bases of genetically determined variation in growth of marine invertebrate larvae: A study of growth heterosis in the bivalve Crassostrea gigas. Journal of Experimental Marine Biology and Ecology 335:188-209.
- Moore, M., and D.T. Manahan. 2007. Variation among females in egg lipid content and developmental success of echinoderms from McMurdo Sound, Antarctica. Polar Biology 30:1245-1252.
- Pace, D.A. and D.T. Manahan. 2007. Efficiencies and costs of larval growth in different food environments (Asteroidea: Asterina miniata). Journal of Experimental Marine Biology and Ecology 353:89-106.
- Meyer, E. and D.T. Manahan. 2009. Nutrient uptake by marine invertebrates: Cloning and functional analysis of amino acid transporter genes in developing sea urchins (Strongylocentrotus purpuratus). Biological Bulletin. 217:6–24.
- Meyer, E. and D.T. Manahan. 2010. Gene expression profiling of genetically-determined growth variation in bivalve larvae (Crassostrea gigas). Journal of Experimental Biology. 213:749-758.
