= William Rees Brebner Robertson =

American zoologist and cytogeneticist (1881–1941)

William Rees Brebner Robertson (31 May 1881 – 15 March 1941) was an American zoologist and early cytogeneticist who discovered the chromosomal rearrangement named in his honour, Robertsonian translocation, the most common structural chromosomal abnormalities seen in humans that result in syndromes of multiple malformations, including trisomy 13 Patau syndrome and trisomy 21 Down syndrome.

Born in Manchester, Kansas, he was raised on a farm in Dickinson County in a small family of Scottish ancestry. Fluent in Scottish Gaelic, French and German, as a young boy he developed a keen and enduring interest in grasshoppers that proliferated in his father's fields; seven species of which formed the basis of his 1916 paper in which he described what is known as a Robertsonian translocation (ROB).

Graduating Abilene High School he attended the University of Kansas (A.B., 1906; A.M., 1907), one of Clarence Erwin McClung's eager students of cytology. An Austin Teaching Fellow of Zoology at Harvard University (Ph.D., 1915), he obtained his doctorate in the laboratory of Edward Laurens Mark.

Dr. Robertson was a research scientist of the golden era of classical genetics, a period when the tools were breeding experiments and microscopes. Returning to the University of Kansas as Professor in the Department of Zoology, then moving to the University of Missouri; during the period of 1917-27 Dr. Robertson devoted himself to the extensive breeding of 4,800 turkeys and derived a valuable set of exquisite data, including many skin and feather samples.

Moving to Iowa in 1930, while Dr. Robertson never published on the turkey materials and data, he left them in such order that they were subsequently published in 1943 by his doctoral students. Held in great esteem by the students he inspired with measured and painstaking research practices, he was deceased before the preparation of their manuscript, while Professor in the Anatomy Department of the Medical School of the University of Iowa. Valuable contributions to the understanding of inheritance in these birds were proven in his data.

The final years of his life in Iowa were devoted to teaching, graduate students and further cytogenetics research dealing with the chromosomal relations in pigmy locusts and some larger grasshoppers. He also contributed a chapter on human heredity, "The Biological and Eugenical Background of The Family" to Jung's "Modern Marriage."

Dr. Robertson is buried alongside his parents at the Keystone Cemetery in Dickinson County, Kansas; his scientific legacy born of childhood curiosity on its plains.
