= Kerckhoff Marine Laboratory =

Laboratory at the California Institute of Technology

Coordinates: 33°35′50″N 117°52′45″W

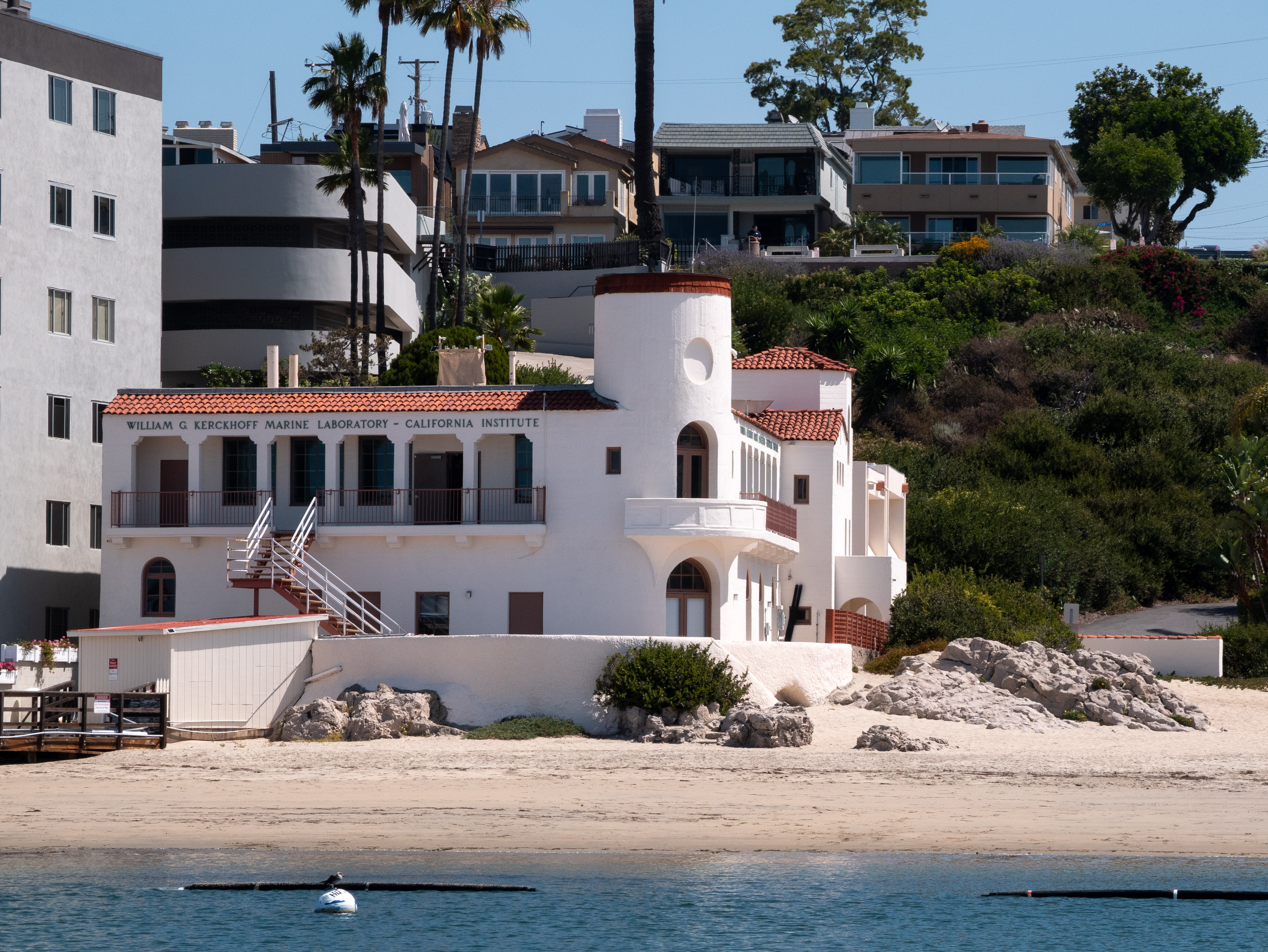
Kerckhoff Marine Laboratory from the water

The William G. Kerckhoff Marine Laboratory is owned and operated by the California Institute of Technology (Caltech). It is located 101 Dahlia Street, in the Corona del Mar district of Newport Beach, in Orange County, California.

== History ==
The marine laboratory was established by biologist Thomas Hunt Morgan in 1928 to replicate the facilities at the Stazione Zoologica in Naples, Italy. Caltech made the decision to purchase the facility in 1929. It is one of the oldest marine laboratories on the West Coast of the United States. From 1962 until his death in 2002, Dr. Wheeler J. North conducted numerous studies on the ecology of the California kelp forests while based at this laboratory. During the 1990s and 2000s investigators included members of the Eric Davidson lab working on various marine biology related projects. The current Director of the Kerckhoff Marine Lab is Prof. Victoria J. Orphan, who maintains an active research program there.

== See also ==
- Marine biology
- Marine ecosystem
