= Howard Allen Schneiderman =

American entomologist and physiologist

Howard Allen Schneiderman (9 February 1927 – 5 December 1990) was an American entomologist who was a co-discoverer of the insect juvenile hormone II. He worked at several universities before working in Monsanto.

Schneiderman was born in New York City and studied art at Swarthmore College obtaining a degree with high honors in mathematics and natural sciences in 1948. He then studied zoology at Harvard University and obtained a doctorate in 1952. His research was on the metabolism of hawkmoths in diapause. He worked as an associate professor at Cornell University from 1953 to 1961. He helped found the developmental biology center at Case Western Reserve University where he worked on juvenile hormones and was a co-discoverer of JH II. He moved to University of California, Irvine in 1969 as Chair of the Department of Developmental and Cell Biology, and later as third Dean of Biological Sciences following James McGaugh.

He moved to Monsanto Company in 1979 where he served as a senior vice president of research and later became a member of the board of directors. The work involved partnerships between Monsanto and Washington University in St. Louis and the development of Monsanto's Life Sciences Research Center for Biotechnology Research in Chesterfield. Nearly 40 patents were obtained under his leadership. Schneiderman Lecture Hall on the University of California, Irvine campus was named for Schneideman.
