= Washington County, Rhode Island =

County in Rhode Island, United States

Washington County
- County
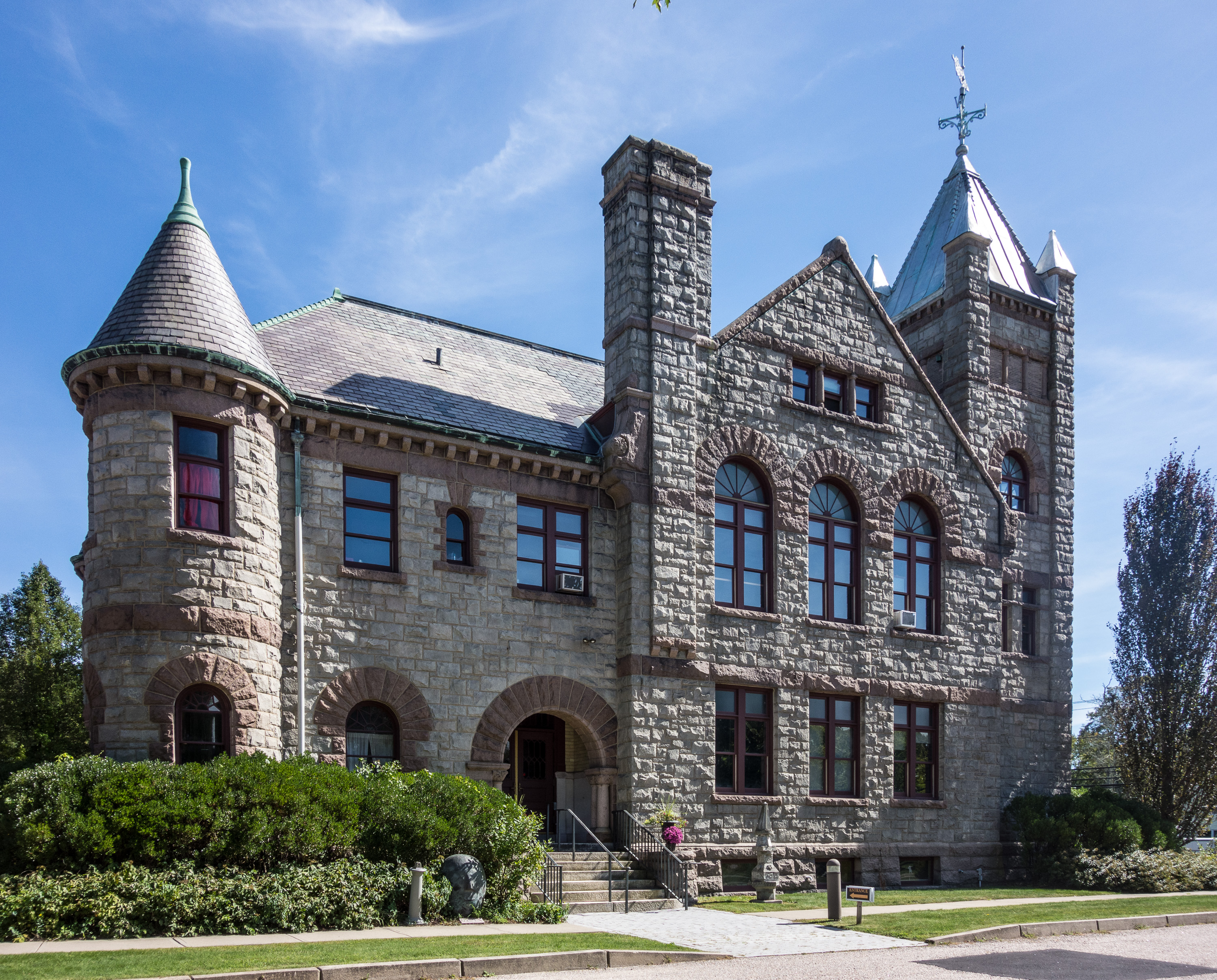
- Former Washington County Courthouse in West Kingston
- Coordinates: 41.39°N 71.62°W
- Country: United States
- State: Rhode Island
- Region: New England
- Metro area: Providence
- Formed: June 3, 1729; 297 years ago
- Named for: George Washington
- County town: South Kingstown
- Largest town: South Kingstown
- Incorporated municipalities: 9 towns

Area
  - Total: 563 sq mi (1,460 km^{2})
  - Land: 329 sq mi (850 km^{2})
  - Water: 234 sq mi (610 km^{2}) 41%
- Highest elevation: 567 ft (173 m)
- Lowest elevation: 0 ft (0 m)

Population (April 1, 2020)
  - Total: 129,839
  - Estimate (2025): 129,795 ▼
  - Density: 230/sq mi (89/km^{2})

GDP
  - Total: $8.636 billion (2022)
- Time zone: UTC−5 (EST)
  - Summer (DST): UTC−4 (EDT)
- ZIP Code format: 028xx
- Area code: 401
- FIPS code: 44-009
- GNIS feature ID: 1219782
- Congressional district: 2nd

Washington County, known to Rhode Islanders as South County, is a county located in the U.S. state of Rhode Island. As of the 2020 census, the population was 129,839. Rhode Island counties have no governmental functions other than as court administrative boundaries, which are part of the state government.

== History ==
The area today known as Washington County was part of the ancestral lands of the Narragansett Indian Tribe. During the second half of the 17th Century, about a dozen English colonists from Newport and Massachusetts colonies moved to the area to establish farms; the larger of these were known as "Narragansett Planters."

By the mid-18th century, there were 25 to 30 large plantations in the county, and their owners became very wealthy. The labor for these farms came from enslaved people; it is estimated that about 15% and 25% of Washington County’s population was enslaved.

Washington County was created as Kings County in 1729 within the Colony of Rhode Island and Providence Plantations. It was renamed Washington County on October 29, 1781, in honor of George Washington. At the earliest stage of colonial settlement, the area was called "The Narragansett Country", named after the Naragansett tribe and its tributary tribe the Niantics, both of whom lived in the area.

Early land purchases in the Narragansett Country were effected by settlers after the establishment of Indian trading posts at Fort Neck in Charlestown, and at Smith's Castle in Wickford. A series of conflicts involving the Manisseans on Block Island gave that island to the Massachusetts Bay Colony for a number of years, before being transferred to the Rhode Island Colony under Newport County, and then finally to Washington County in 1963.

=== Independent jurisdiction ===
The borders of the Narragansett country were disputed for nearly 100 years among the colonies of Rhode Island, Connecticut, and Massachusetts. Massachusetts and Connecticut claimed the land as spoils of war from the Pequot War and established the Atherton Trading Company to issue land grants. Complicating things, the Narragansetts had pledged their fealty to King Charles, and the area was known as "The King's Province" and was placed under the authority of Rhode Island "until the King's pleasure was further known".

The Royal Commission of 1664 sent by Charles II stepped in to adjudicate these conflicting claims. The commission extinguished the claims of Massachusetts, and Rhode Island was granted jurisdiction until the commission finished processing Connecticut's appeals. However, due to circumstances, the commission never processed its report and the territory remained in dispute.

In April, 1683, the king commissioned Governor Edward Cranfield of New Hampshire (the highest ranking Crown official in New England), William Stoughton, and a few other men for the purpose of adjudication of the King's Province or Narragansett country. All of them held strong feelings against the government of Rhode Island.

The commissioners assembled at Smith's Castle, near Wickford, attended by the agents of the Connecticut Colony and Plymouth Colony to litigate their respective claims to the King's Province. Rhode Island peremptorily refused to acknowledge their authority. The legislature ordered a troop of cavalry to prohibit the commissioners from keeping court.

They adjourned to Boston and finally adjudged "that the jurisdiction of the King's Province belonged of right to Connecticut."

Since the dispute was not settled, the King's Province was administered as a separate jurisdiction. The 1688 commission of Edmund Andros as Governor of the Dominion of New England specifically calls out the King's Province separately from Rhode Island.

=== Settlement of Dispute ===
The disputes were not ended until 1726. Settlements of King's Province were named to reflect the English Restoration, in honor of King Charles II. Towns reflecting this history include the two Kingstowns and Charlestown, as well as the villages of Kingston and West Kingston.

Washington County is also known in Rhode Island as "South County", though some definitions of South County include outside towns, such as East Greenwich in neighboring Kent County, and exclude towns within Washington County, such as New Shoreham.

== Geography ==
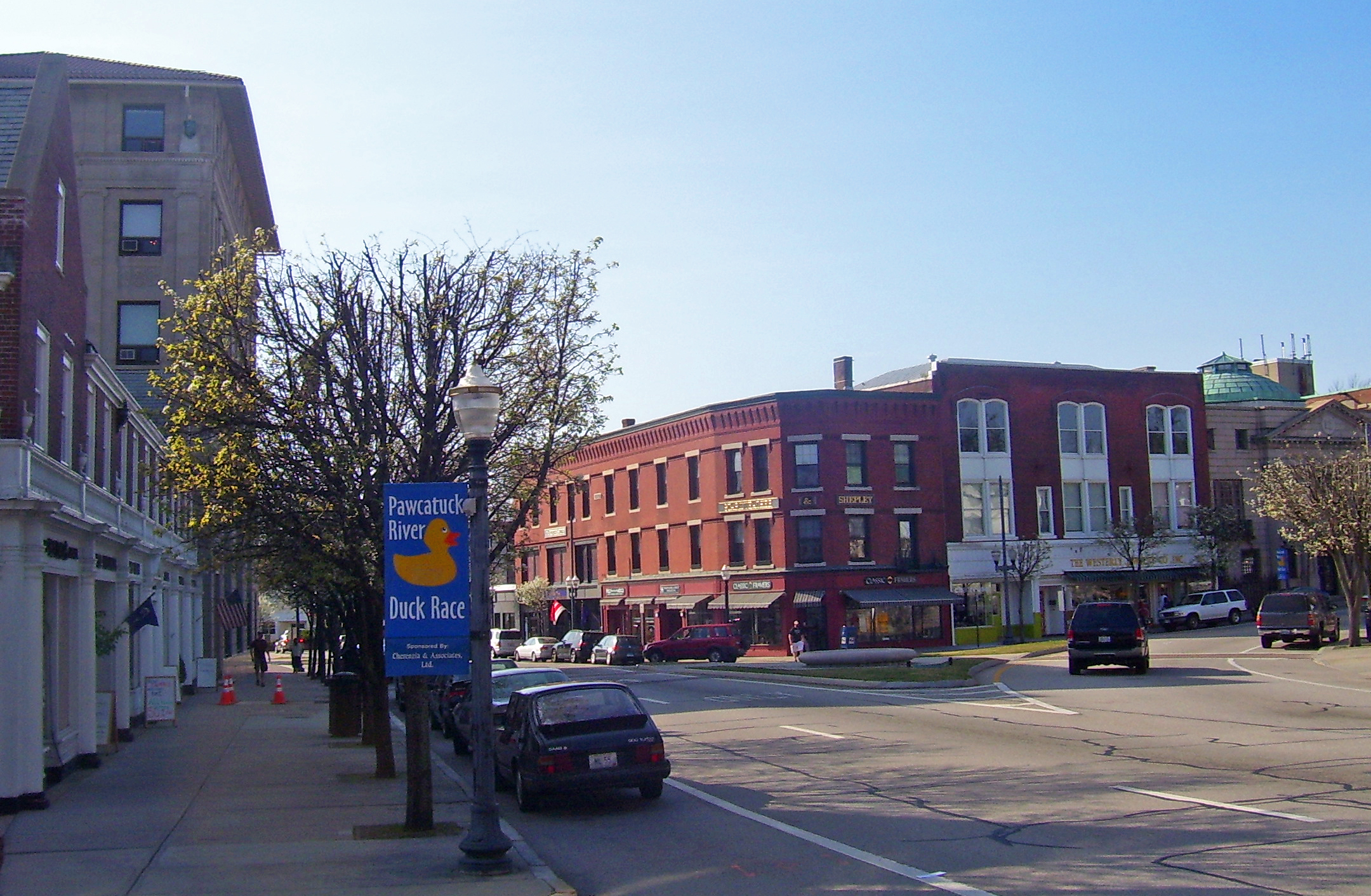
Historic Downtown Westerly, Rhode Island

According to the U.S. Census Bureau, the county has a total area of 563 square miles (1,460 km^{2}), of which 329 square miles (850 km^{2}) is land and 234 square miles (610 km^{2}) (41%) is water. It is the largest county in Rhode Island by total area. The county's topography ranges from flat along the shoreline to gently rolling hills farther inland. The highest point is a large area approximately 560 feet (170 m) above sea level in the Exeter neighborhood of Black Plain; the lowest point is sea level along the coast. The northern boundary west of Davisville is approximately 41.60°N. The western boundary north of Westerly is approximately 71.79°W.

=== National protected areas ===
- Block Island National Wildlife Refuge
- John H. Chafee National Wildlife Refuge
- Ninigret National Wildlife Refuge
- Trustom Pond National Wildlife Refuge

=== Major highways ===
- I-95
- US 1
- Route 1A
- Route 2
- Route 3
- Route 4
- Route 78
- Route 91
- Route 102
- Route 108
- Route 110
- Route 112
- Route 138
- Route 165
- Route 216
- Route 402
- Route 403

== Demographics ==
Historical population
Census	Pop.	Note	%±
1790	18,323		—
1800	16,135		−11.9%
1810	14,962		−7.3%
1820	15,687		4.8%
1830	15,411		−1.8%
1840	14,324		−7.1%
1850	16,430		14.7%
1860	18,715		13.9%
1870	20,097		7.4%
1880	22,495		11.9%
1890	23,649		5.1%
1900	24,154		2.1%
1910	24,942		3.3%
1920	24,932		0.0%
1930	29,334		17.7%
1940	32,493		10.8%
1950	48,542		49.4%
1960	59,054		21.7%
1970	83,586		41.5%
1980	93,317		11.6%
1990	110,006		17.9%
2000	123,546		12.3%
2010	126,979		2.8%
2020	129,839		2.3%
2025 (est.)	129,795	▼	0.0%
U.S. Decennial Census; 1790-1960 1900-1990; 1990-2000 2010-2019

=== 2020 census ===
As of the 2020 census, the county had a population of 129,839. Of the residents, 16.2% were under the age of 18 and 22.7% were 65 years of age or older; the median age was 46.9 years, with 93.0 males for every 100 females and 90.9 males for every 100 females age 18 and over. 66.4% of residents lived in urban areas and 33.6% lived in rural areas.

The racial makeup of the county was 89.5% White, 1.2% Black or African American, 0.8% American Indian and Alaska Native, 2.0% Asian, 1.5% from some other race, and 5.0% from two or more races. Hispanic or Latino residents of any race comprised 3.5% of the population.

There were 52,439 households in the county, of which 23.2% had children under the age of 18 living with them and 26.4% had a female householder with no spouse or partner present. About 29.0% of all households were made up of individuals and 14.4% had someone living alone who was 65 years of age or older.

There were 65,694 housing units, of which 20.2% were vacant. Among occupied housing units, 74.6% were owner-occupied and 25.4% were renter-occupied. The homeowner vacancy rate was 0.9% and the rental vacancy rate was 5.7%.

Washington County, Rhode Island – Racial and ethnic composition Note: the US Census treats Hispanic/Latino as an ethnic category. This table excludes Latinos from the racial categories and assigns them to a separate category. Hispanics/Latinos may be of any race.
Race / Ethnicity (NH = Non-Hispanic)	Pop 2000	Pop 2010	Pop 2020	% 2000	% 2010	% 2020
White alone (NH)	116,134	117,330	115,089	94.00%	92.40%	88.63%
Black or African American alone (NH)	1,074	1,347	1,468	0.86%	1.06%	1.13%
Native American or Alaska Native alone (NH)	1,087	1,007	917	0.87%	0.79%	0.70%
Asian alone (NH)	1,850	2,054	2,605	1.49%	1.61%	2.00%
Pacific Islander alone (NH)	23	23	48	0.01%	0.01%	0.03%
Other race alone (NH)	120	189	490	0.09%	0.14%	0.37%
Mixed race or Multiracial (NH)	1,478	2,003	4,644	1.19%	1.57%	3.57%
Hispanic or Latino (any race)	1,780	3,026	4,578	1.44%	2.38%	3.52%
Total	123,546	126,979	129,839	100.00%	100.00%	100.00%

== Communities ==
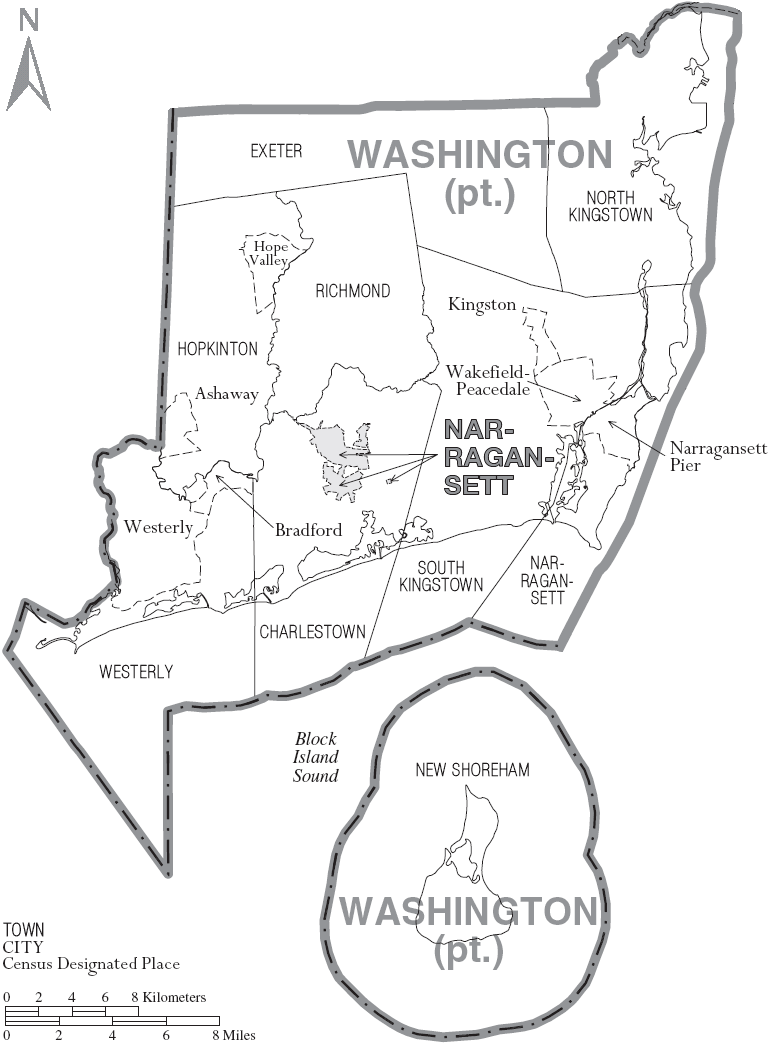
Map of Washington County, Rhode Island showing towns, census-designated places, and Narragansett tribal lands

=== Towns ===
- Charlestown
- Exeter
- Hopkinton
- Narragansett
- New Shoreham
- North Kingstown
- Richmond
- South Kingstown (traditional county seat)
- Westerly

=== Census-designated places ===
- Ashaway
- Bradford
- Carolina
- Charlestown
- Hope Valley
- Hopkinton
- Kingston
- Misquamicut
- Narragansett Pier
- Quonochontaug
- Wakefield-Peacedale
- Watch Hill
- Weekapaug
- Westerly
- Wyoming

=== Other villages ===
- Alton
- Arcadia
- Barberville
- Bethel
- Burdickville
- Canonchet
- Centerville
- Davisville
- Galilee
- Hamilton
- Hopkinton City
- Jerusalem
- Kenyon
- Lafayette
- Locustville
- Matunuck
- Moscow
- Peace Dale
- Point Judith
- Rockville
- Saunderstown
- Shannock
- Shelter Harbor
- Slocum
- Usquepaug
- Wakefield
- West Kingston
- White Rock
- Wickford
- Wood River Junction
- Woodville

=== Ghost towns ===
Napatree point

== Politics ==
United States presidential election results for Washington County, Rhode Island
Year	Republican / Whig		Democratic		Third party(ies)	
Year	No.	%	No.	%	No.	%
1844	967	57.59%	712	42.41%	0	0.00%
1852	1,022	46.71%	1,086	49.63%	80	3.66%
1880	2,017	62.02%	1,229	37.79%	6	0.18%
1884	2,014	60.08%	1,155	34.46%	183	5.46%
1888	2,346	57.54%	1,492	36.60%	239	5.86%
1892	2,183	52.83%	1,501	36.33%	448	10.84%
1896	3,040	72.05%	654	15.50%	525	12.44%
1900	2,421	66.35%	960	26.31%	268	7.34%
1904	3,189	70.63%	1,197	26.51%	129	2.86%
1908	3,043	66.46%	1,278	27.91%	258	5.63%
1912	2,129	44.91%	1,691	35.67%	921	19.43%
1916	2,837	55.17%	2,224	43.25%	81	1.58%
1920	6,420	74.93%	2,012	23.48%	136	1.59%
1924	8,038	75.21%	2,366	22.14%	283	2.65%
1928	7,793	68.84%	3,500	30.92%	27	0.24%
1932	7,307	58.42%	5,047	40.35%	153	1.22%
1936	8,764	58.21%	5,956	39.56%	336	2.23%
1940	9,233	60.54%	6,001	39.35%	17	0.11%
1944	8,233	56.12%	6,419	43.76%	18	0.12%
1948	9,522	55.88%	7,379	43.30%	140	0.82%
1952	13,389	61.29%	8,448	38.67%	9	0.04%
1956	14,278	65.71%	7,450	34.29%	0	0.00%
1960	12,651	52.21%	11,580	47.79%	0	0.00%
1964	7,342	29.63%	17,434	70.37%	0	0.00%
1968	11,639	43.40%	13,851	51.65%	1,328	4.95%
1972	19,280	58.46%	13,637	41.35%	62	0.19%
1976	17,856	49.57%	17,980	49.91%	186	0.52%
1980	16,932	41.47%	16,429	40.24%	7,466	18.29%
1984	24,365	57.59%	17,793	42.06%	147	0.35%
1988	21,650	48.04%	23,210	51.51%	202	0.45%
1992	16,211	30.62%	23,009	43.46%	13,724	25.92%
1996	16,302	32.71%	25,958	52.09%	7,572	15.20%
2000	21,253	37.80%	29,560	52.58%	5,411	9.62%
2004	26,533	42.36%	34,679	55.37%	1,422	2.27%
2008	25,624	38.73%	39,082	59.07%	1,454	2.20%
2012	25,366	40.34%	35,888	57.07%	1,625	2.58%
2016	27,230	41.03%	33,741	50.84%	5,398	8.13%
2020	29,818	39.20%	44,549	58.57%	1,693	2.23%
2024	31,247	41.10%	42,589	56.01%	2,200	2.89%

Similar to other counties in Rhode Island, Washington County votes Democratic in presidential elections, having last voted Republican in 1984.

Gubernatorial elections results

Gubernatorial elections results
Year	Republican	Democratic	Third parties
2022	38.7% 22,827	57.9% 34,160	3.4% 1,959
2018	36.8% 20,646	52.5% 29,431	10.7% 6,021
2014	36.24% 17,972	38.46% 18,261	23.69% 11,253
2010	35.57% 17,637	16.73% 8,192	47.7% 23,648

United States Senate election results for Washington County, Rhode Island1
Year	Republican		Democratic		Third party(ies)	
Year	No.	%	No.	%	No.	%
2024	30,661	41.56%	42,992	58.27%	126	0.17%
2018	23,189	41.14%	33,071	58.67%	110	0.20%
2012	24,209	40.79%	35,006	58.99%	131	0.22%

United States Senate election results for Washington County, Rhode Island2
Year	Republican		Democratic		Third party(ies)	
Year	No.	%	No.	%	No.	%
2020	26,189	35.64%	47,188	64.22%	105	0.14%
2014	15,742	33.74%	30,849	66.12%	66	0.14%

== See also ==
- National Register of Historic Places listings in Washington County, Rhode Island
