= National Register of Historic Places listings in Hopkinton, Rhode Island =

This is a list of Registered Historic Places in Hopkinton, Rhode Island.

Contents: Counties in Rhode Island

Bristol | Kent | Newport | Providence (Pawtucket | Providence (city) | Woonsocket) | Washington

This National Park Service list is complete through NPS recent listings posted April 24, 2026.

	Name on the Register	Image	Date listed	Location	City or town	Description
1	Black Farm		November 7, 1995 (#95001268)	Bounded by the Rockville-Alton Rd. (RI 112) and the Wood River; 41°28′06″N 71°43′23″W	Hopkinton	
2	Bradford Village Historic District	Bradford Village Historic District	May 30, 1996 (#96000573)	Roughly Bowling Ln. from the Pawcatuck River to Vars Ln. and Main St. from the Bradford Bridge to Church Ave. 41°24′08″N 71°45′06″W	Hopkinton and Westerly	
3	Hope Valley Historic District	Hope Valley Historic District	July 3, 2004 (#04000654)	Main Street; 41°30′28″N 71°43′00″W	Hopkinton	
4	Hopkinton City Historic District	Hopkinton City Historic District	May 1, 1974 (#74000010)	Hopkinton; 41°27′40″N 71°46′39″W	Hopkinton	
5	Tomaquag Rock Shelters	Tomaquag Rock Shelters	August 12, 1977 (#77000011)	Address Restricted	Hopkinton	
6	Upper Rockville Mill	Upper Rockville Mill	July 5, 2006 (#06000552)	332 Canonchet Rd. 41°31′20″N 71°45′36″W	Hopkinton	
7	Wyoming Village Historic District	Wyoming Village Historic District	May 2, 1974 (#74000014)	Roughly bounded by RI 3, RI 138, Old Nooseneck Hill Rd., Bridge and Prospect Sts. 41°30′57″N 71°42′12″W	Hopkinton and Richmond	

== See also ==
- National Register of Historic Places listings in Washington County, Rhode Island
- List of National Historic Landmarks in Rhode Island
