= Route 78 (Rhode Island–Connecticut) =

Highway in Connecticut and Rhode Island

Route 78
- Westerly Bypass; Veterans Way
- Route 78 highlighted in red

Route information
- Maintained by RIDOT & ConnDOT
- Length: 4.6 mi (7.4 km): Connecticut: 0.43 mi (0.69 km); Rhode Island: 4.20 mi (6.76 km)
- Existed: 1979–present

Major junctions
- West end: Route 2 in Stonington, CT
- East end: US 1 in Westerly, RI

Location
- Country: United States
- States: Rhode Island, Connecticut
- Counties: New London (CT), Washington (RI)

Highway system
- Rhode Island Routes
- Connecticut State Highway System; Interstate; US; State; SSR; SR; Scenic
← Route 77	RI	→ Route 81
← Route 77	CT	→ Route 79

Route 78, also known as the Westerly Bypass, is a two-lane divided freeway between Stonington, Connecticut, to Westerly, Rhode Island. The route is about 4.6 miles (7.4 km) long and begins at Connecticut Route 2 in Stonington, crossing into Rhode Island at the Pawcatuck River, where it continues to U.S. Route 1 in Westerly. The route was constructed in 1979, after a sixteen-year delay. The designation was to become part of the Orient Point–Watch Hill Bridge, but this plan was later dropped. The route was given the memorial name of Veterans Way in 2004.

== Route description ==
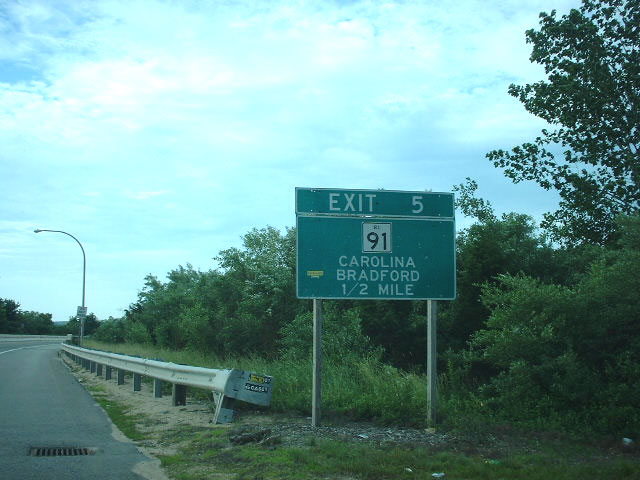
Signage for exit 2 in Westerly until the exits were renumbered

Route 78 begins at an interchange with Route 2 in Stonington, Connecticut. The freeway heads eastward, crossing over the Pawcatuck River and into Rhode Island. Route 78 crosses over White Rock Road and Canal Street, entering the community of Stillmanville. There, the highway comes upon a small, partial interchange with High Street, which connects drivers to Route 3. After crossing over Route 3, Route 78 turns to the south. In the opposite direction, where it turns eastward, there is an interchange with Route 3. The route heads southward through the local development, coming to a partial cloverleaf interchange with Route 91 at exit 2. The route continues southward, passing Chapman Pond. The route turns southwest, interchanging partially with U.S. Route 1, where the Route 78 designation ends. The right-of-way continues as Airport Road towards Westerly State Airport.

== History ==
In the mid-1950s, the Rhode Island Department of Public Works (RIDPW) put forward a proposal to create a four-lane "relocation" of Route 3 in Westerly. This relocated highway was to connect with Interstate 95, and when planned, the route was to exist farther east then it does currently. During the late 1950s, the RIDPW moved the location of the bypass to its current location, creating a 4.8 miles (7.7 km) long bypass of Westerly and connecting with Interstate 95 in Stonington, Connecticut. The route was proposed to begin at an interchange with U.S. Route 1 near Westerly State Airport, take an arc expressway and into Connecticut. First estimated to cost $4 million (1959 USD), construction of the new Route 78 Expressway was planned to begin in 1961 and finish in 1963, but lack of funds held off construction for several years.

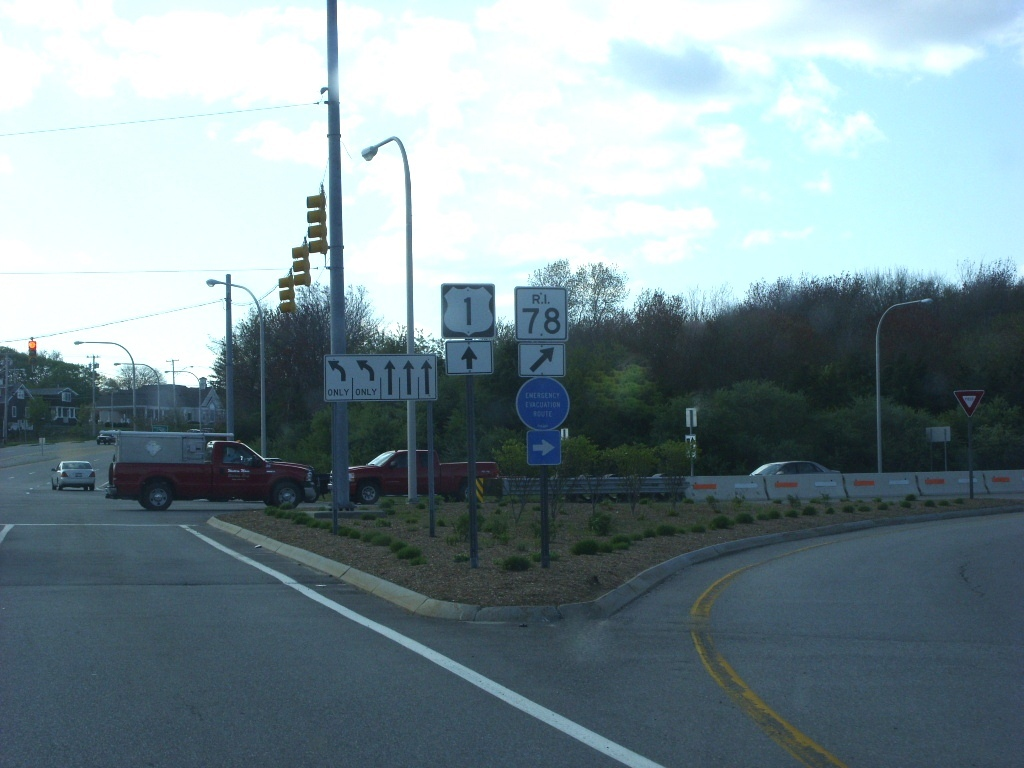
The eastern terminus of Route 78 at US 1 in Westerly, Rhode Island

In 1967, the state highway officials in Connecticut began to collaborate with Rhode Island officials to construct the new Route 78 Expressway in both states. The plan became detailed as Route 78 would start at US 1 in Rhode Island, continue over the Pawcatuck River into Connecticut, where it follow Route 2 over to Interstate 95 where it would form an interchange 91A with the interstate. However, this new interchange and extension were pulled by 1971, due to lack of funding. By 1974, the cost had ballooned to $12.8 million (1974 USD) along with a budget crisis around that time, the two states scaled down the project from at an intersection with US 1 to an intersection with Route 2. The bypass was finally constructed in the late 1970s, and opened to traffic in 1979. After a number of head-on collisions, the Rhode Island Department of Transportation added medians to the highway, and in 2004, the bypass was given the memorial name of Veterans Way, which was proposed in 2002.

In 1961, during the time of the proposals, the New York State Department of Transportation suggested to extend the Long Island Expressway another 55 miles (89 km) using a multi-span bridge across the Long Island Sound from Riverhead, New York, to Westerly, Rhode Island. The bridge was to extend from Orient Point, New York, to Watch Hill, Rhode Island, and although it was never added to the interstate highway plans, the theory of a new bridge was restarted in 1979, with a feasibility study. However, officials from Rhode Island and New York were both uninterested from continuing the project.

== Exit list ==
In Fall 2018, exit numbers were converted from sequential numbering to mileage-based numbering to conform to federal highway standards.

State	County	Location	mi	km	Exit	Destinations	Notes
Connecticut	New London	Stonington	0.00	0.00	–	Route 2 to I-95 – Pawcatuck, Norwich	Western terminus; at-grade intersection
Connecticut–Rhode Island state line			0.43 0.0	0.69 0.0	Route transition		
Rhode Island	Washington	Westerly	1.0	1.6	1	High Street	Eastbound exit and westbound entrance
Rhode Island	Washington	Westerly	1.7	2.7	1	Route 3 to I-95 – Ashaway, Hopkinton	Westbound exit and eastbound entrance
Rhode Island	Washington	Westerly	2.3	3.7	2	Route 91 – Carolina, Bradford	
Rhode Island	Washington	Westerly	4.2	6.8	–	US 1 – Downtown Westerly, Westerly State Airport, Misquamicut Beach	Eastern terminus; at-grade intersection; access to Airport via Airport Road
1.000 mi = 1.609 km; 1.000 km = 0.621 mi
