= Hopkinton =

Hopkinton is the name of several places in the United States:

- Hopkinton, Iowa
- Hopkinton, Massachusetts, a New England town
  - Hopkinton (CDP), Massachusetts, the main village in the town
- Hopkinton, New Hampshire
- Hopkinton, New York
- Hopkinton, Rhode Island, a New England town
  - Hopkinton (CDP), Rhode Island, a village in the town
