= Hopkinton (CDP), Rhode Island =

Census-designated place in Rhode Island, United States

Hopkinton, Rhode Island Hopkinton City
- Census-designated place
- Location within Rhode Island Location within the United States
- Coordinates: 41°27′41″N 71°46′40″W
- Country: United States
- State: Rhode Island
- County: Washington
- Town: Hopkinton

Area
  - Total: 3.31 sq mi (8.57 km^{2})
  - Land: 3.30 sq mi (8.55 km^{2})
  - Water: 0.0039 sq mi (0.01 km^{2})
- Elevation: 170 ft (52 m)

Population (2020)
  - Total: 475
  - Density: 143.8/sq mi (55.54/km^{2})
- Time zone: UTC-5 (Eastern (EST))
  - Summer (DST): UTC-4 (EDT)
- ZIP Codes: 02833 (Hopkinton); 02804 (Ashaway)
- Area code: 401
- FIPS code: 44-35200
- GNIS feature ID: 2631335

Hopkinton is a census-designated place (CDP) in Washington County, Rhode Island, United States, comprising the central village in the town of Hopkinton. It was first listed as a CDP prior to the 2020 census. The village is also known as Hopkinton City, and the center of the village comprises the Hopkinton City Historic District.

Hopkinton village is on the western edge of Washington County, in the west-central part of the town of Hopkinton. Its western border is the Connecticut state line. Rhode Island Route 3 passes through the center of the village, leading northeast 4 miles (6 km) to Hope Valley, the largest village in the town of Hopkinton, and south 3 miles (5 km) to Ashaway, the second-largest village. Interstate 95 runs through the southeastern part of the Hopkinton CDP, with access from Exit 1 with Route 3 between Hopkinton village and Ashaway. I-95 leads northeast 36 miles (58 km) to Providence, the state capital, and southwest 19 miles (31 km) to New London, Connecticut.

== Demographics ==
Historical population
Census	Pop.	Note	%±
2020	475		—
U.S. Decennial Census

=== 2020 census ===
The 2020 United States census counted 475 people, 212 households, and 152 families in Hopkinton. The population density was 143.9 per square mile (55.5/km^{2}). There were 226 housing units at an average density of 68.4 per square mile (26.4/km^{2}). The racial makeup was 91.16% (433) white or European American (90.74% non-Hispanic white), 0.84% (4) black or African-American, 0.63% (3) Native American or Alaska Native, 0.42% (2) Asian, 0.0% (0) Pacific Islander or Native Hawaiian, 1.05% (5) from other races, and 5.89% (28) from two or more races. Hispanic or Latino of any race was 3.37% (16) of the population.

Of the 212 households, 21.2% had children under the age of 18; 38.2% were married couples living together; 27.4% had a female householder with no spouse or partner present. 46.2% of households consisted of individuals and 27.8% had someone living alone who was 65 years of age or older. The average household size was 2.2 and the average family size was 3.1. The percent of those with a bachelor's degree or higher was estimated to be 19.6% of the population.

13.7% of the population was under the age of 18, 9.5% from 18 to 24, 20.8% from 25 to 44, 22.7% from 45 to 64, and 33.3% who were 65 years of age or older. The median age was 50.3 years. For every 100 females, the population had 122.0 males. For every 100 females ages 18 and older, there were 129.1 males.
