= Westerly (CDP), Rhode Island =

Census-designated place in Rhode Island, United States

Westerly
- CDP
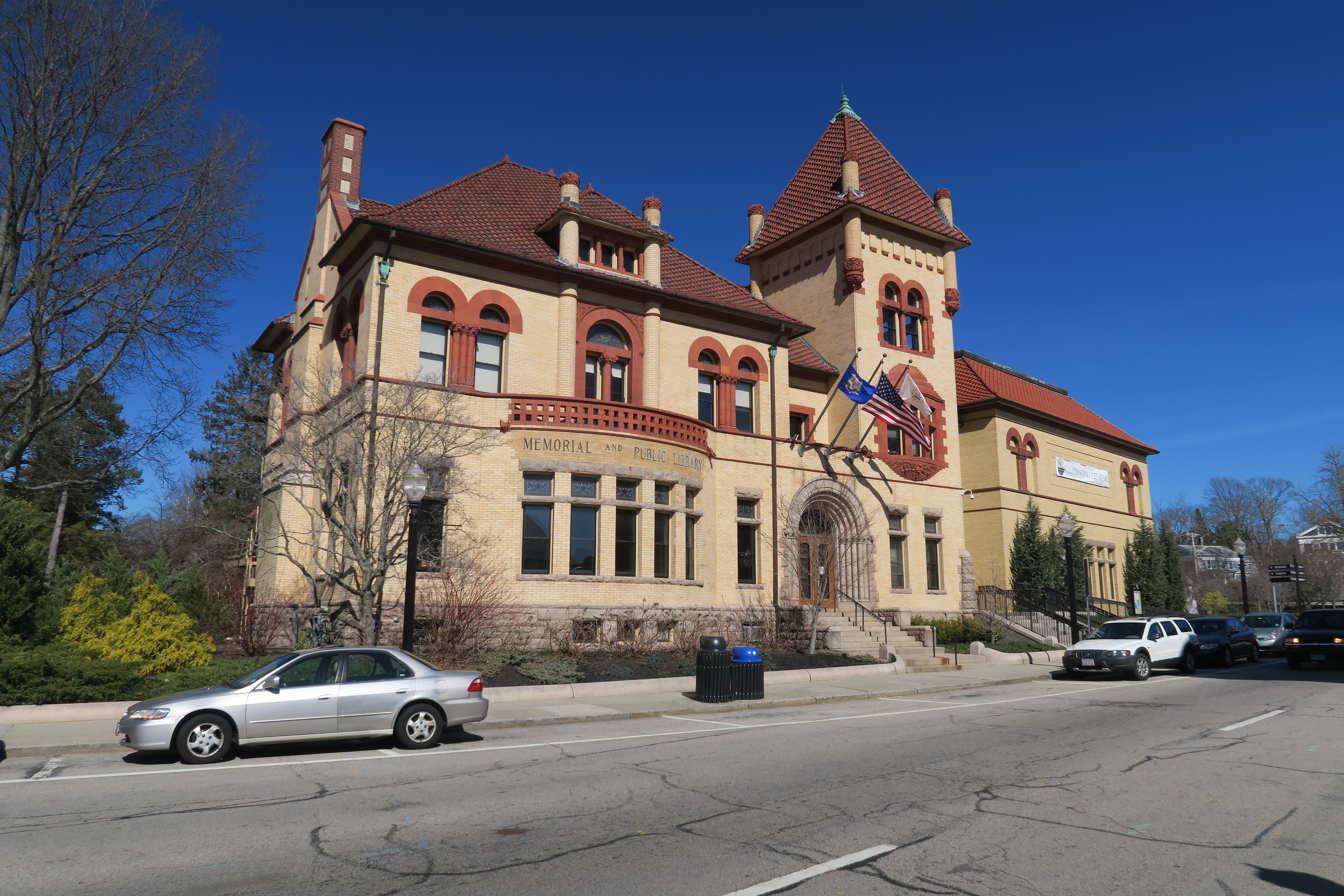
- Westerly Public Library

- Location within the state of Rhode Island
- Coordinates: 41°22′29″N 71°49′7″W
- Country: United States
- State: Rhode Island
- County: Washington

Area
  - Total: 16.52 sq mi (42.79 km^{2})
  - Land: 15.83 sq mi (41.01 km^{2})
  - Water: 0.69 sq mi (1.78 km^{2})

Population (2020)
  - Total: 18,423
  - Density: 1,163.5/sq mi (449.23/km^{2})
- Time zone: UTC-5 (Eastern (EST))
  - Summer (DST): UTC-4 (EDT)
- FIPS code: 44-76820

Westerly is a census-designated place (CDP) in the town of Westerly in Washington County, Rhode Island, United States. The population was 17,682 at the 2000 census. The CDP includes the majority of the town of Westerly's population, with only the rural eastern and coastal southern portions of towns excluded.

== Geography ==
According to the United States Census Bureau, the CDP has a total area of 16.5 square miles (43 km^{2}), of which 16 mi^{2} (41 km^{2}) is land and 0.5 mi^{2} (1.3 km^{2}) (3.15%) is water.

== Demographics ==
Historical population
Census	Pop.	Note	%±
2020	18,423		—
U.S. Decennial Census

=== 2020 census ===
The 2020 United States census counted 18,423 people, 8,227 households, and 5,037 families in Westerly. The population density was 1,163.5 inhabitants per square mile (449.2/km^{2}). There were 9,195 housing units at an average density of 580.7 per square mile (224.2/km^{2}). The racial makeup was 87.85% (16,184) white or European American (85.95% non-Hispanic white), 1.05% (194) black or African-American, 0.81% (149) Native American or Alaska Native, 3.07% (565) Asian, 0.07% (12) Pacific Islander or Native Hawaiian, 1.51% (278) from other races, and 5.65% (1,041) from two or more races. Hispanic or Latino of any race was 5.29% (975) of the population.

Of the 8,227 households, 21.7% had children under the age of 18; 41.5% were married couples living together; 31.2% had a female householder with no spouse or partner present. 34.4% of households consisted of individuals and 16.4% had someone living alone who was 65 years of age or older. The average household size was 2.1 and the average family size was 2.6. The percent of those with a bachelor’s degree or higher was estimated to be 27.6% of the population.

16.6% of the population was under the age of 18, 7.4% from 18 to 24, 22.4% from 25 to 44, 29.3% from 45 to 64, and 24.4% who were 65 years of age or older. The median age was 48.3 years. For every 100 females, the population had 110.2 males. For every 100 females ages 18 and older, there were 112.1 males.

The 2016–2020 5-year American Community Survey estimates show that the median household income was $75,200 (with a margin of error of +/- $8,709) and the median family income was $100,079 (+/- $6,362). Males had a median income of $44,647 (+/- $15,095) versus $40,161 (+/- $3,328) for females. The median income for those above 16 years old was $40,772 (+/- $3,774). Approximately, 2.7% of families and 7.2% of the population were below the poverty line, including 7.3% of those under the age of 18 and 4.5% of those ages 65 or over.

=== 2000 census ===
As of the census of 2000, there were 17,682 people, 7,346 households, and 4,657 families residing in the CDP. The population density was 1,107.0 inhabitants per square mile (427.4/km^{2}). There were 7,812 housing units at an average density of 489.1/mi^{2} (188.9/km^{2}). The racial makeup of the CDP was 94.65% White, 0.82% Black or African American, 0.55% Native American, 2.40% Asian, 0.34% from other races, and 1.24% from two or more races. Hispanic or Latino of any race were 1.16% of the population.

There were 7,346 households, out of which 28.7% had children under the age of 18 living with them, 48.4% were married couples living together, 11.1% had a female householder with no husband present, and 36.6% were non-families. 30.6% of all households were made up of individuals, and 13.5% had someone living alone who was 65 years of age or older. The average household size was 2.36 and the average family size was 2.97.

In the CDP, the population was spread out, with 22.7% under the age of 18, 7.3% from 18 to 24, 29.8% from 25 to 44, 22.3% from 45 to 64, and 17.9% who were 65 years of age or older. The median age was 39 years. For every 100 females, there were 92.3 males. For every 100 females age 18 and over, there were 88.3 males.

The median income for a household in the CDP was $42,860, and the median income for a family was $53,130. Males had a median income of $37,213 versus $26,096 for females. The per capita income for the CDP was $23,180. About 4.3% of families and 6.8% of the population were below the poverty line, including 9.2% of those under age 18 and 7.8% of those age 65 or over.
