= Centerville-Moscow, Rhode Island =

Villages in Hopkinton, Rhode Island, US

Coordinates: 41.5222°N 71.7437°W

Centerville and Moscow are two rural adjacent villages in the town of Hopkinton, Rhode Island, United States. Located just outside the village of Hope Valley, the two villages are very small and are only separated by Moscow Pond, a small pond in the Rockville Management Area in the northern section of town. Sometimes referred to as "Centerville-Moscow", the area is located on and around Rhode Island Route 138, known as Spring Street, between the villages of Hope Valley and Rockville.

== Name ==
The name of the community Moscow is likely derived from the name of the adjacent Moscow Pond. Moscow may be derived from a root maskaw- in the Narragansett or a closely related Algonquian language meaning 'rushes'; compare place names in Rhode Island such as Masquachug or Mascuachusett, both meaning 'place of rushes' or 'swampy area.'

== Overview ==
Centerville is located to the west of Moscow. Inside the village, there is the Greenwood Hill Campground, located off of Newberry Lane. Moscow, to the east of the pond, is the site of some historic houses as well as some newer ones along Fenner Hill Road, which leads into Hope Valley. Both villages use the postal code "02832", the zip code for Hope Valley. There is, still standing, what was the Centerville Mill which was a small textile mill. It still stands though it lost its third floor to a fire sometime in the 40s. It was occupied for a time as a furniture making studio.
