= Arcadia, Rhode Island =

Village in Rhode Island, United States

Coordinates: 41°33′20″N 71°41′48″W

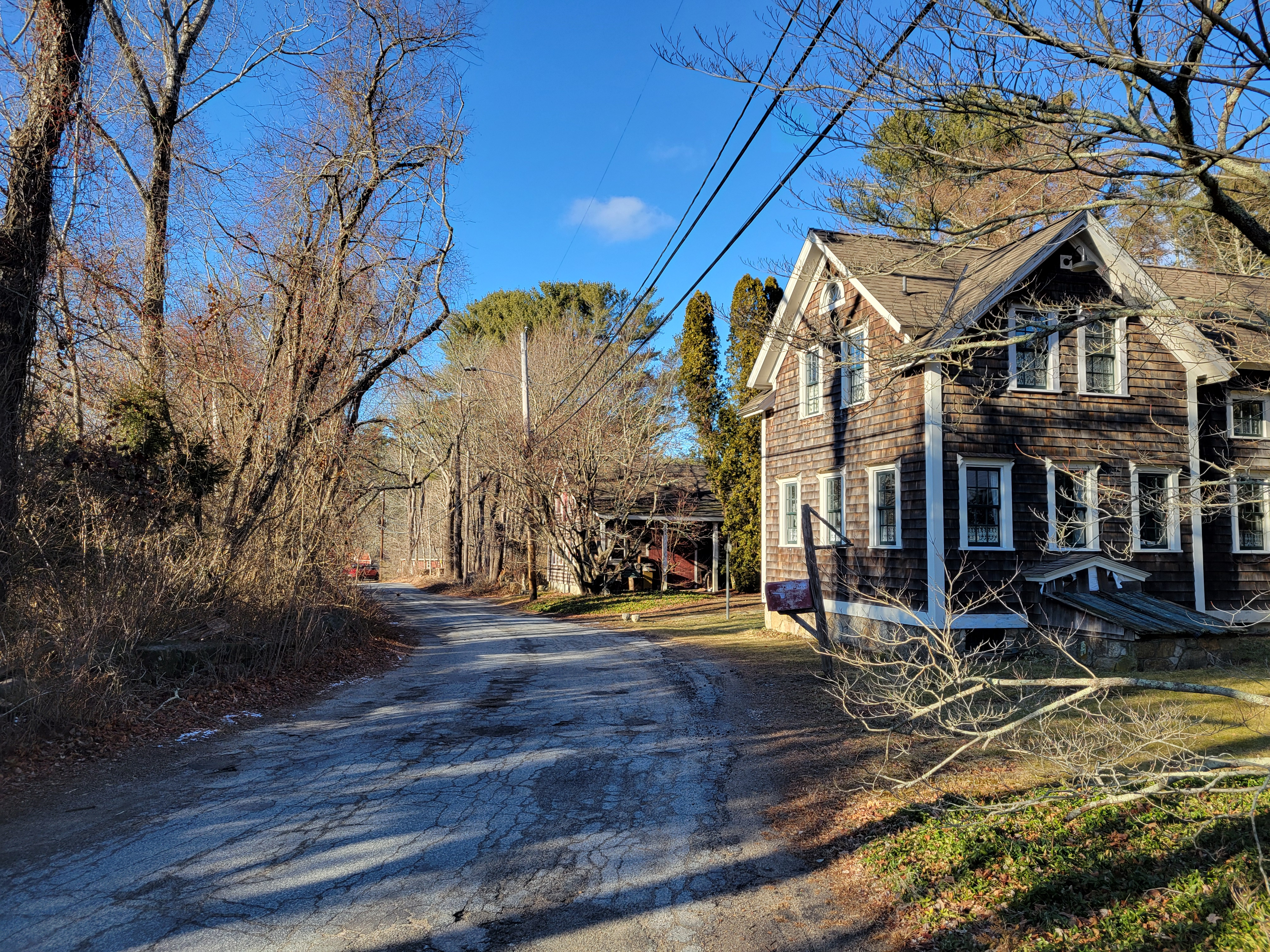
Summit Road

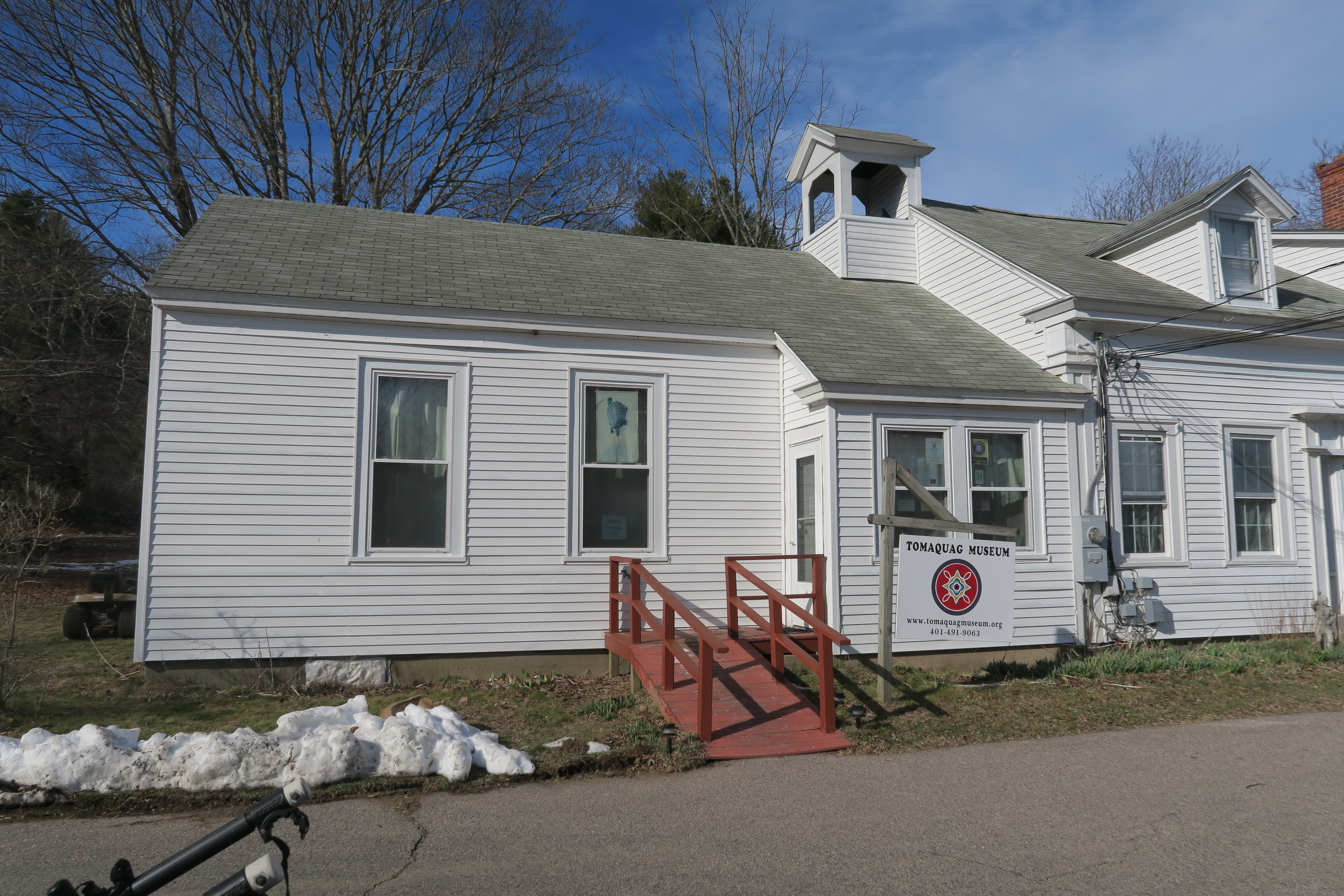
Tomaquag Museum

Arcadia is a village in the towns of Richmond and Exeter in the U.S. state of Rhode Island.

== Overview ==
Secluded from most busy areas, the only way to access the small village located near the tri-point of the towns of Richmond, Exeter and Hopkinton, Rhode Island, is by Arcadia Road, via Nooseneck Hill Road. The village of Arcadia is located in the Arcadia Management Area. After reaching the village, Arcadia Road turns east towards KG Ranch Road in Richmond, while continuing straight will lead further into the village along Summit Road. Summit Road soon becomes a dirt trail that reaches 10 Rod Road in Exeter.

Arcadia is a small village with a low population. The majority of housing units are located on the Richmond side, at the beginning of Summit Road or on Mill Road.

Arcadia has two postal codes. Those living on the Exeter side use "02822", Exeter, while those on the Richmond side use "02832" Hope Valley.

The Tomaquag Museum is located in Arcadia, on the Exeter side. Within the museum was a private school, the Nuweetooun School, that closed in 2010 due to flooding.
