= Rockville, Rhode Island =

- Village
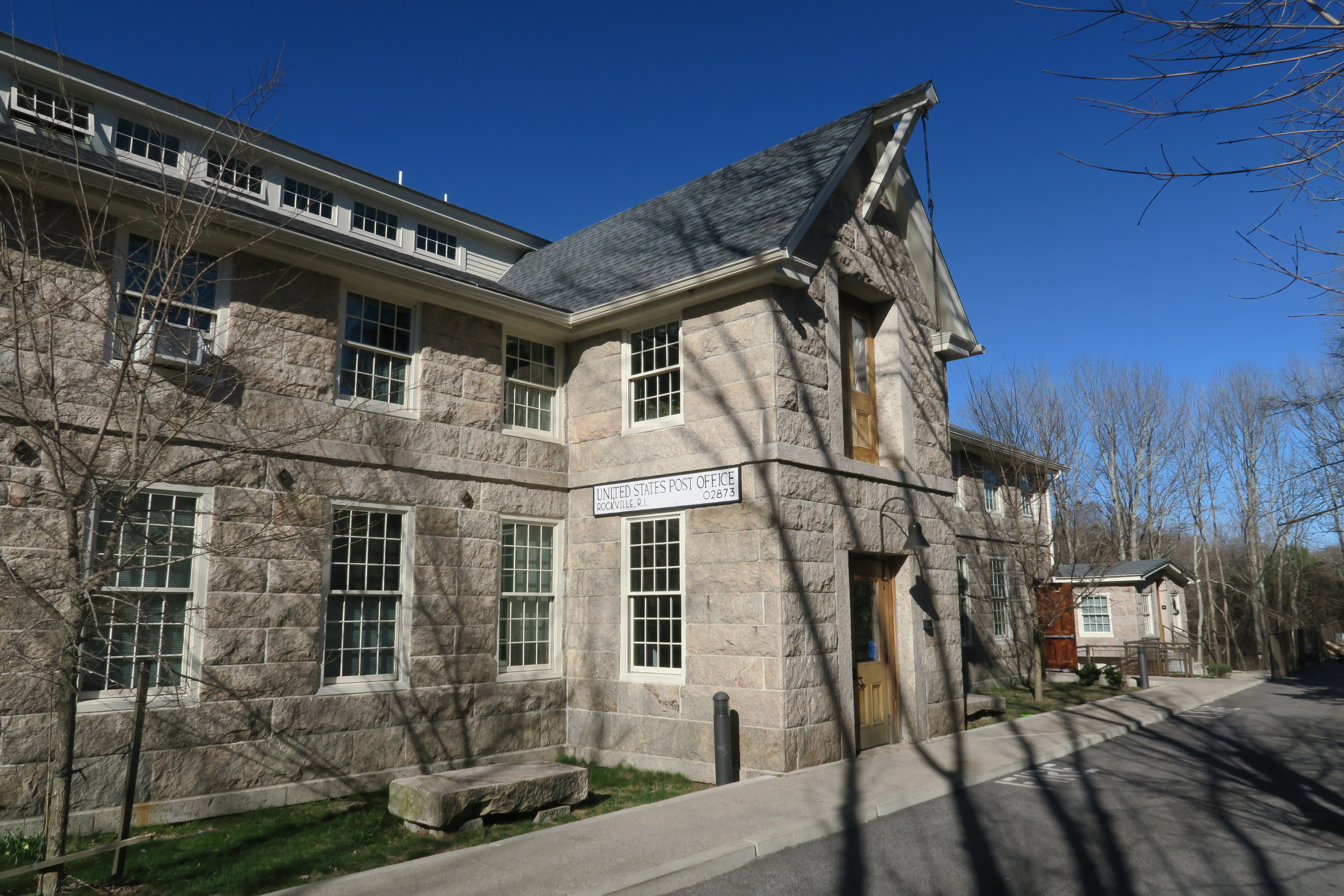
- Post Office

- Location within Rhode Island
- Coordinates: 41.521°N 71.761°W
- Country: United States
- State: Rhode Island
- County: Washington
- Town: Hopkinton
- Elevation: 322 ft (98 m)
- Time zone: UTC−5 (Eastern (EST))
  - Summer (DST): UTC−4 (EDT)
- ZIP Code: 02873
- Area code: 401
- GNIS feature ID: 1217862

Rockville is a village in the town of Hopkinton, Rhode Island, United States. The ZIP Code is 02873.

== Notable people ==
- Burrows Burdick, Wisconsin legislator, was born in Rockville in 1823.

== Notable locations ==
- Yawgoog Scout Reservation, one of the oldest Scout camps in operation
