= Ashaway, Rhode Island =

Village and CDP in Hopkinton, Rhode Island, US

- CDP
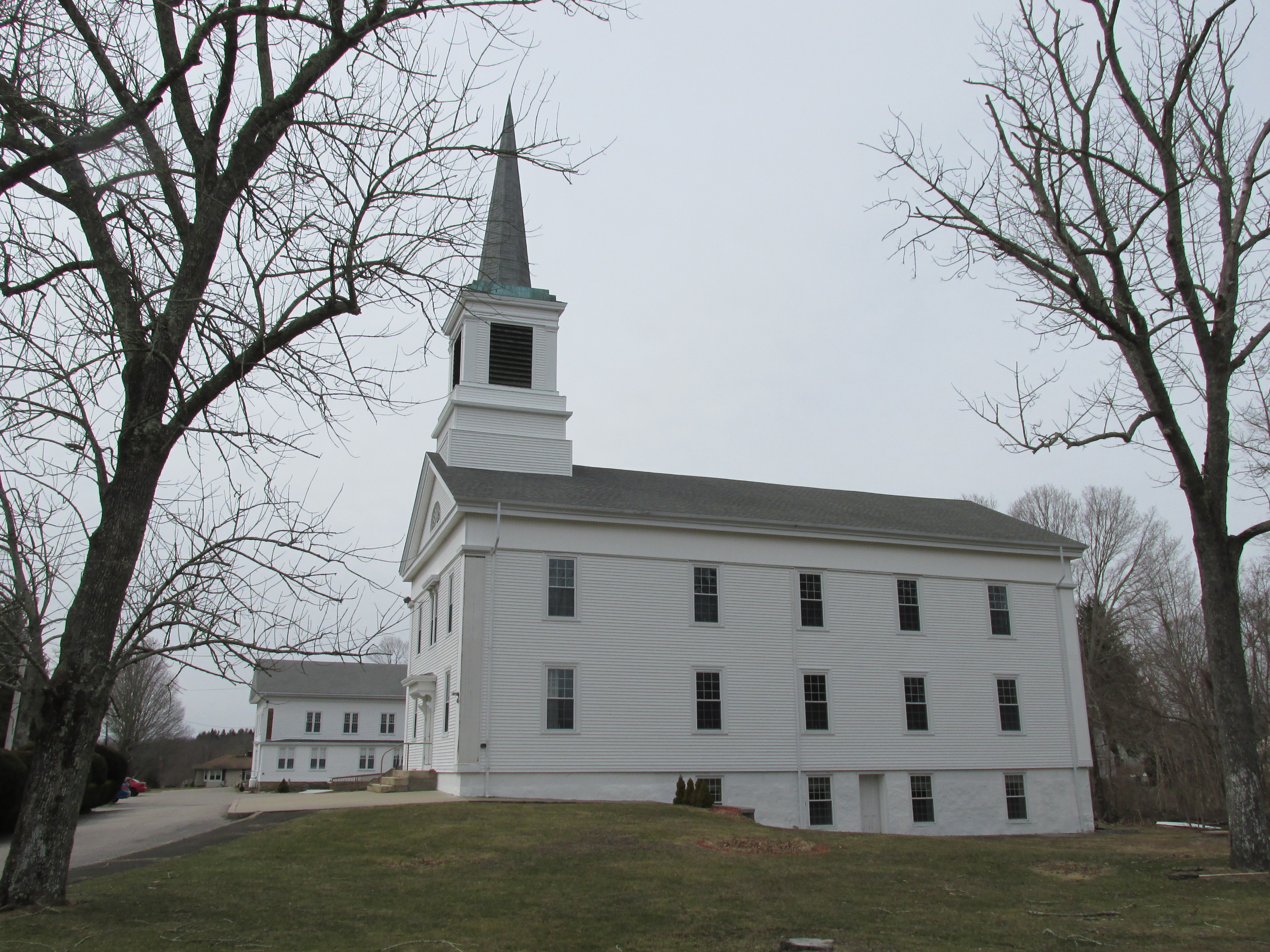
- First Seventh Day Baptist Church of Hopkinton

- Location in the state of Rhode Island
- Coordinates: 41°25′23″N 71°47′20″W
- State: Rhode Island
- County: Washington

Area
  - Total: 2.42 sq mi (6.26 km^{2})
  - Land: 2.37 sq mi (6.15 km^{2})
  - Water: 0.042 sq mi (0.11 km^{2})
- Elevation: 62 ft (19 m)

Population (2020)
  - Total: 1,501
  - Density: 632.2/sq mi (244.11/km^{2})
- Time zone: UTC−5 (Eastern (EST))
  - Summer (DST): UTC−4 (EDT)
- ZIP Code: 02804
- Area code: 401
- FIPS code: 44-03520
- GNIS feature ID: 1217657

Ashaway (/ˈæʃəweɪ/) is an unincorporated village and census-designated place (CDP) in the town of Hopkinton, Rhode Island, United States. It is a principal village of Hopkinton, along with Hope Valley, although it is the smaller of the two. As of the 2020 census, Ashaway had a population of 1,501. The name Ashaway is derived from the American Indian name for the river that runs through the village, the Ashawague or Ashawaug, which means "land in the middle" or "land between" in the Niantic and Mohegan languages. The name "Ashawague River" appears as late as 1832 on the Findley map of Rhode Island published in Philadelphia.

== Geography ==
Ashaway is located at 41°25′23″N 71°47′20″W (41.423004, −71.788839).

According to the United States Census Bureau, the CDP has a total area of 6.2 km^{2} (2.4 sq mi), of which 6.2 km^{2} (2.4 sq mi) is land and 0.1 km^{2} (0.039 sq mi) (1.24%) is water.

== Demographics ==
Historical population
| Census | Pop. | Note | %± |
|---|---|---|---|
| 2020 | 1,501 | | — |
U.S. Decennial Census

=== 2020 census ===
The 2020 United States census counted 1,501 people, 584 households, and 430 families in Ashaway. The population density was 632.3 people per square mile (244.1 people/km^{2}). There were 622 housing units at an average density of 262.0 units per square mile (101.2 units/km^{2}). The racial makeup was 94.0% (1,411) white or European American (92.94% non-Hispanic white), 0.33% (5) black or African-American, 1.07% (16) Native American or Alaska Native, 0.4% (6) Asian, 0.0% (0) Pacific Islander or Native Hawaiian, 0.07% (1) from other races, and 4.13% (62) from two or more races. Hispanic or Latino of any race was 2.2% (33) of the population.

Of the 584 households, 28.4% had children under the age of 18; 52.7% were married couples living together; 21.9% had a female householder with no spouse or partner present. 24.5% of households consisted of individuals and 8.9% had someone living alone who was 65 years of age or older. The average household size was 2.8 and the average family size was 3.1. The percent of those with a bachelor's degree or higher was estimated to be 11.7% of the population.

22.2% of the population was under the age of 18, 6.6% from 18 to 24, 23.2% from 25 to 44, 28.8% from 45 to 64, and 19.2% who were 65 years of age or older. The median age was 43.3 years. For every 100 females, the population had 93.9 males. For every 100 females ages 18 and older, there were 92.1 males.

The 2016–2020 5-year American Community Survey estimates show that the median household income was $103,750 (with a margin of error of +/- $67,913) and the median family income was $100,167 (+/- $82,295). Females had a median income of $40,825 (+/- $12,504). The median income for those above 16 years old was $40,638 (+/- $10,738). Approximately, 0.0% of families and 1.6% of the population were below the poverty line, including 0.0% of those under the age of 18 and 0.0% of those ages 65 or over.

=== 2010 census ===
At the 2010 census, there were 1,485 people, 566 households, and 418 families residing in the CDP. The population density was 239.5 people /km^{2} (620 people/mi^{2}). There were 617 housing units at an average density of 99.5 units /km^{2} (258 units/mi^{2}). The racial make-up of the CDP was 94.14% White, 0.88% African American, 1.55% American Indian, 0.88% Asian and 1.48% from two or more races. Hispanic or Latino of any race were 2.83% of the population.

There were 566 households, of which 33.7% had children under the age of 18 living with them, 54.2% were married couples living together, 13.8% had a female householder with no husband present, 5.8% had a male householder with no wife present and 26.1% were non-families. Of all households, 21.0% were made up of individuals, and 8.8% had someone living alone who was 65 years of age or older. The average household size was 2.62 and the average family size was 3.01.

19% of the population were under the age of 18, 7.3% from 18 to 24, 24% from 25 to 44, 31% from 45 to 64 and 19% were 65 years of age or older. The median age was 42.3 years. There were 95.3 males for every 100 females, and 92.3 males age 18 and over for every 100 females age 18 and over.

The median household income in 2000 was $47,271 and the median family income was $49,125. Males had a median income of $41,375 and females $25,556. The per capita income was $21,149. About 6.6% of families and 7.9% of the population were below the poverty line, including 12.5% of those under age 18 and 9.6% of those age 65 or over.

== Media ==
Ashaway is the city of license for the radio station WSUB-LP, also known as 96.7 FM The Buzz. Its antenna is on top of the old Bradford Dyeing Association smokestack, but the designated city of license is Ashaway by the Federal Communications Commission. WSUB-LP is owned and operated by The Buzz Alternative Radio Foundation, Inc.
