= Burrows Burdick =

American politician (1823–1899)

Burrows Burdick (January 19, 1823 – June 30, 1899) was an American physician from Edgerton, Wisconsin, who spent a single term as a member of the Wisconsin State Assembly from Rock County.

== Background ==
Burdick was born January 19, 1823, in Rockville, Rhode Island, son of Alpheus and Abigail (Vincent) Burdick. He taught school in Little Genesee, New York, before becoming a student at the Alfred Academy and Teachers Seminary in 1844. He studied medicine under Dr. John Hartshorn of Alfred (who was also a trustee of the Academy), and graduated in 1849 from the University Medical College of New York University. In November 1849, he married Phebe Ann Barker of Rockville, who died November 25, 1852. He later married Caroline F. ( Sheldon ) Olney of Coventry, Rhode Island, with whom he had three children.

== Legislative service ==
In 1865, he was elected from the 2nd Rock County Assembly district (the Towns of Fulton, Harmony, Lima and Milton), succeeding Solomon C. Carr who was, like himself, a member of the Union Party or National Union Party, as the Republican Party was calling itself at that time. He was appointed to the standing committees on medical societies and medical colleges, and on privileges and elections. He was not a candidate for re-election, and was succeeded by John T. Dow, also of the Union Party.

== After the Assembly ==
As of 1884, when their son Charles Fremont Burdick died at the age of 28, the Burdicks were still living in Edgerton.

Burrows Burdick died June 30, 1899, at his home in Stoughton, Wisconsin.
