= Locustville, Rhode Island =

Coordinates: 41°30′37″N 71°42′44″W

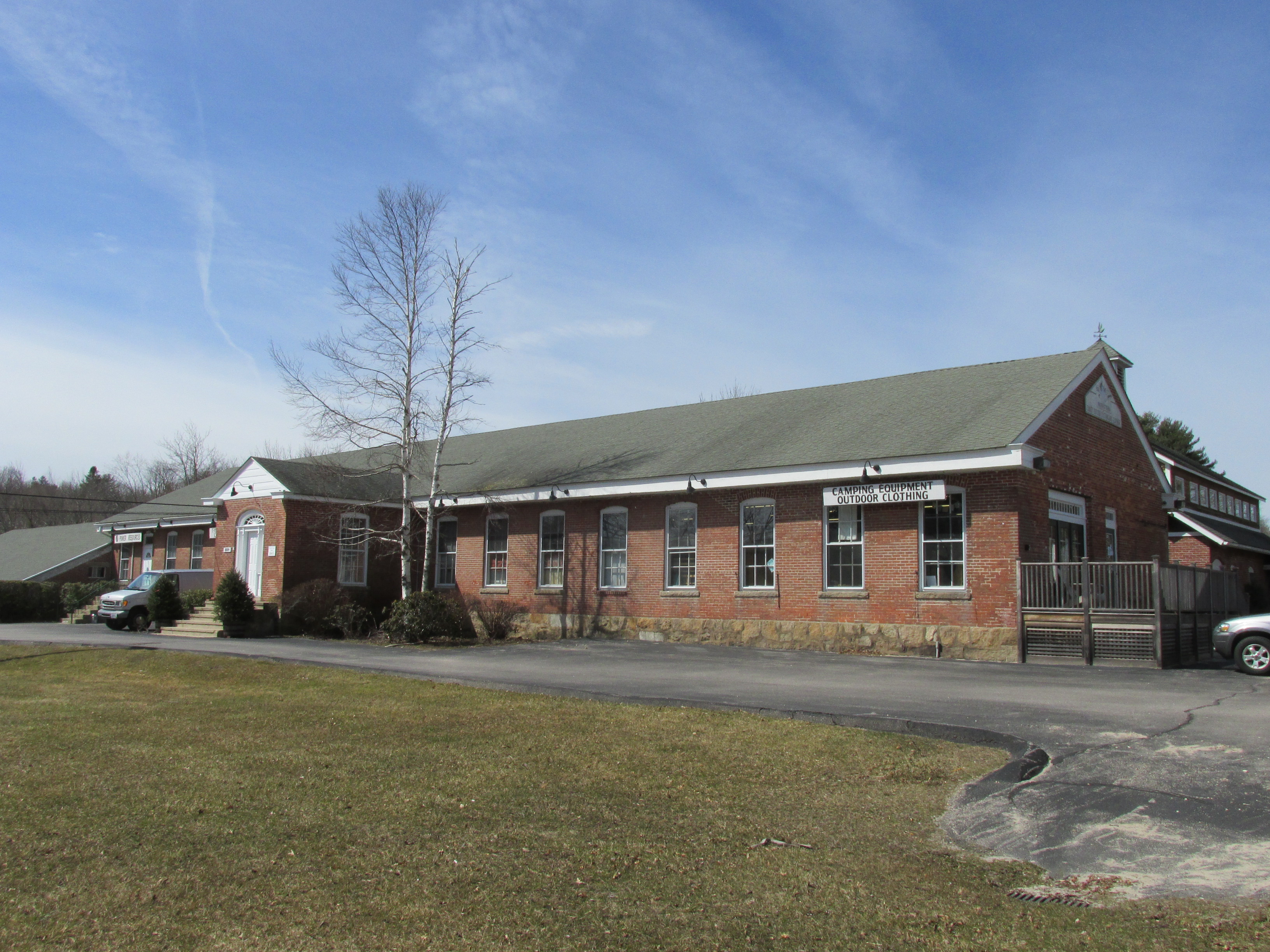
1865 Locustville Mill

The area known as Locustville is today a section of the village of Hope Valley in the town of Hopkinton, Rhode Island, United States.

== Overview ==
Once a separate village, it was virtually "taken over" by Hope Valley, its more dominant neighbor to the south. Locustville is still a known place, and its past can still be seen in the present day. An example is Locustville Road, a small road near the center of the village, and Locustville Pond, a large pond that stretches through much of the present-day borders of the village of Hope Valley.

The site of Locustville is near the Hope Valley Elementary School on Thelma Drive, of which Locustville Road is an offshoot.

Although the areas which were once Locustville are now known as Hope Valley, the name "Locustville" still is a familiar name among residents, and some residents still identify themselves with the village.
