= Slocum, Rhode Island =

Village in North Kingston, Rhode Island, US

Slocum
- Village
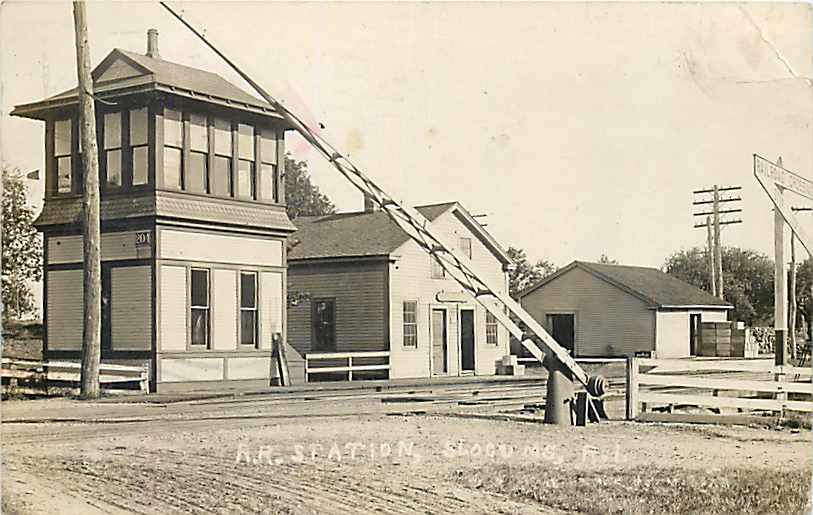
- The railroad station at "Slocums" in 1909
- Interactive map of Slocum
- Coordinates: 41.530°N 71.516°W
- Country: United States
- State: Rhode Island
- County: Washington
- Time zone: EST (UTC−05:00)
  - Summer (DST): EDT (UTC−04:00)
- zipcode: 02877

Slocum is a small village in Washington County, Rhode Island, United States. Located near North Kingstown's border with Exeter, Slocum is largely open fields and farms. Slocum's zip code is 02877.
