= Woodville, Rhode Island =

Village in Rhode Island, U.S.

Coordinates: 41°27′34.85″N 71°43′7.71″W

Woodville
- village
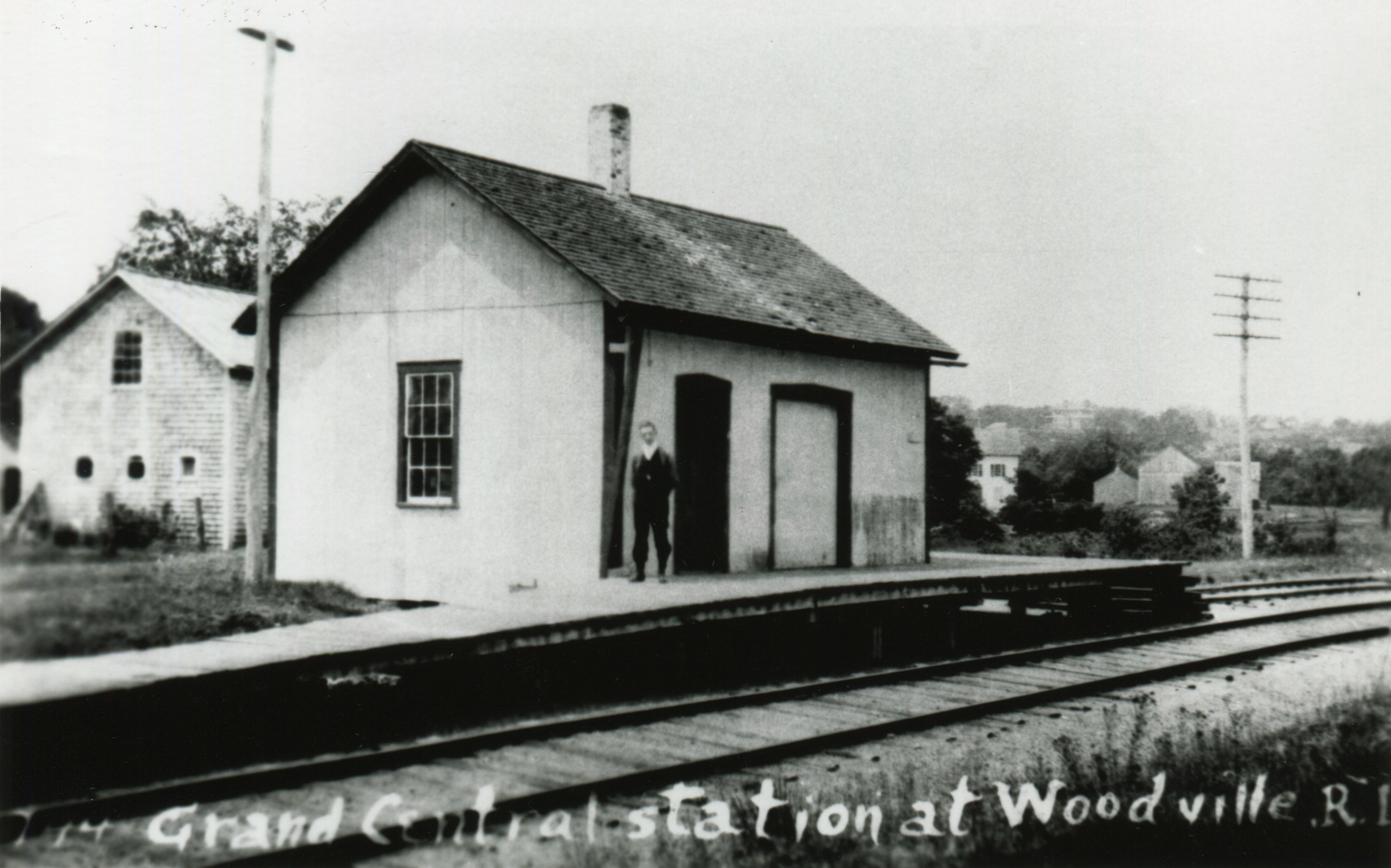
- Woodville Station
- Country: United States
- State: Rhode Island

Population
  - Total: 31,214

Woodville is a small village in the towns of Richmond and Hopkinton in the U.S. state of Rhode Island.

== Overview ==
Located north of the Richmond village of Wood River Junction, Woodville is located upon the Wood River. A section of Woodville Road runs through the village, connecting Switch Road in Richmond to the town center of Hopkinton at Main Street (Rhode Island Route 3).

The mailing address "02832", Hope Valley, is used for the section of Woodville in Hopkinton. The section of Woodville in Richmond uses the mailing address "02894", Wood River Junction.
