= Barberville, Rhode Island =

Human settlement in Rhode Island, United States

Coordinates: 41.540825°N 71.696580°W

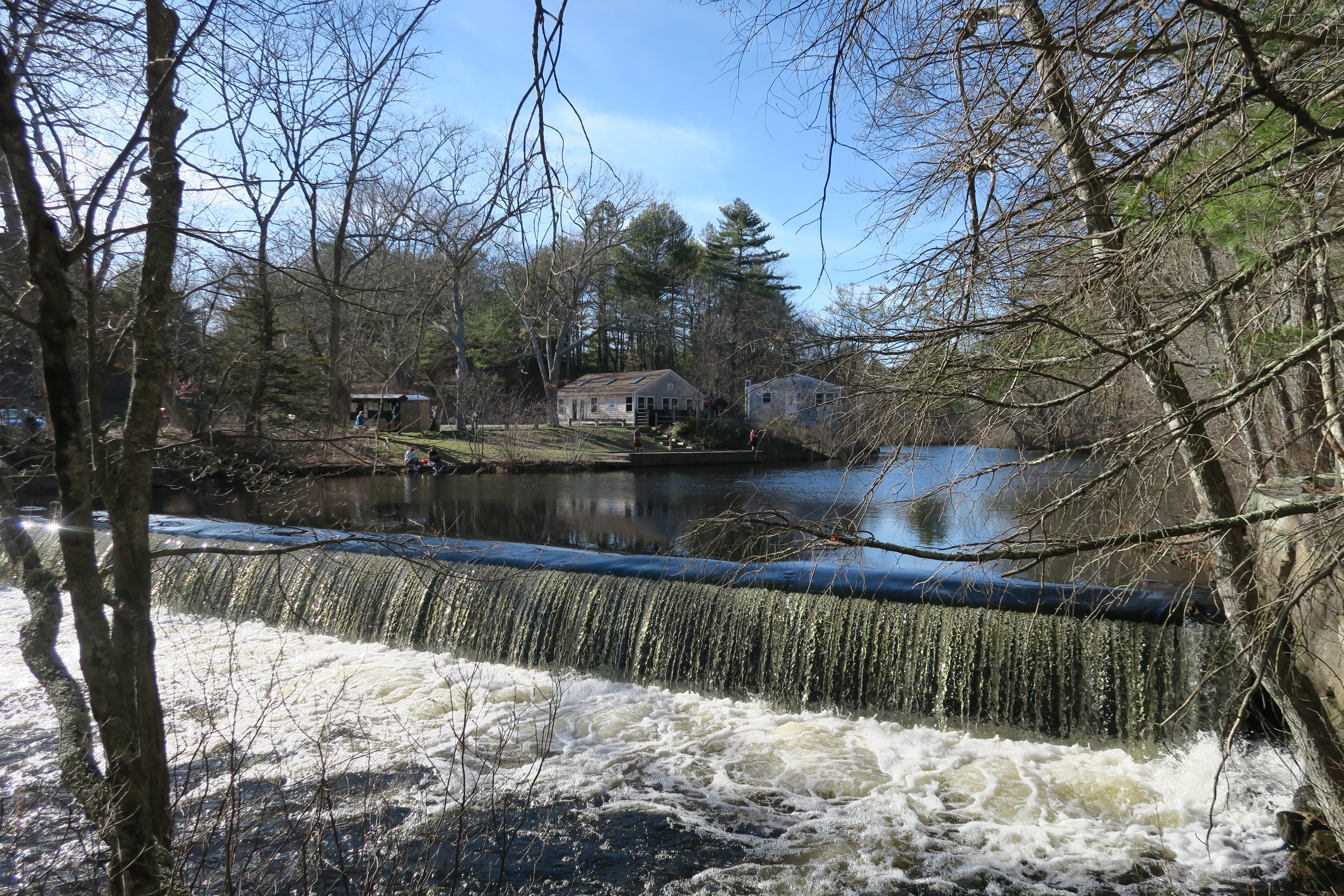
Barberville Dam

Barberville is a small village located primarily in the town of Hopkinton, Rhode Island, but also extending into Richmond, Rhode Island, United States. Barberville is located to the north of Hopkinton's principal village, Hope Valley and uses Hope Valley's zip code, 02832.

== History ==
Barberville has a short history. It was never an extremely populated place; the 1880 census reported a population of 49, and a 1902 gazetteer counted 34. Its genesis comes from when Joseph T. Barber built a dam and sawmill in 1829. The mill burned in a fire in 1869. Barberville was the site of one of Hopkinton's original school districts.

Today, the only major road that passes through Barberville is Arcadia Road. The Wood River, which serves as the border between Hopkinton and Richmond, runs through Barberville and the Wood-Pawcatuck Watershed Association is headquartered in the village.
