= Burdickville, Rhode Island =

Village in Hopkinton, Rhode Island, U.S.

Coordinates: 41°25′05″N 71°43′58″W

Burdickville is a village and former mill town located within the town of Hopkinton in the U.S. state of Rhode Island. The village is located in the southeastern part of town and is near the border with Charlestown at the Pawcatuck River. Burdickville Road runs through it.

It is also a point on the Pawcatuck River where hand-carried boats can be launched. A waterflow monitoring station was here but is not currently active.

The Burdickville Dam was located here, but is now in ruins.

The first gristmill was built in the community, previously known as Brown's Ridge, in the late 18th century. A cotton mill was built on the river's west bank around 1848 by Stephen and William Burdick, which is the origin of the village's its name. A 1929 government report reported the mill buildings to be "dilapidated and beyond repair." A 1931 profile of the village in The Providence Journal described the former mill town as now reduced to only one year-round resident, a grandson of one of the Burdicks.
