= Tomaquag Rock Shelters =

- U.S. National Register of Historic Places
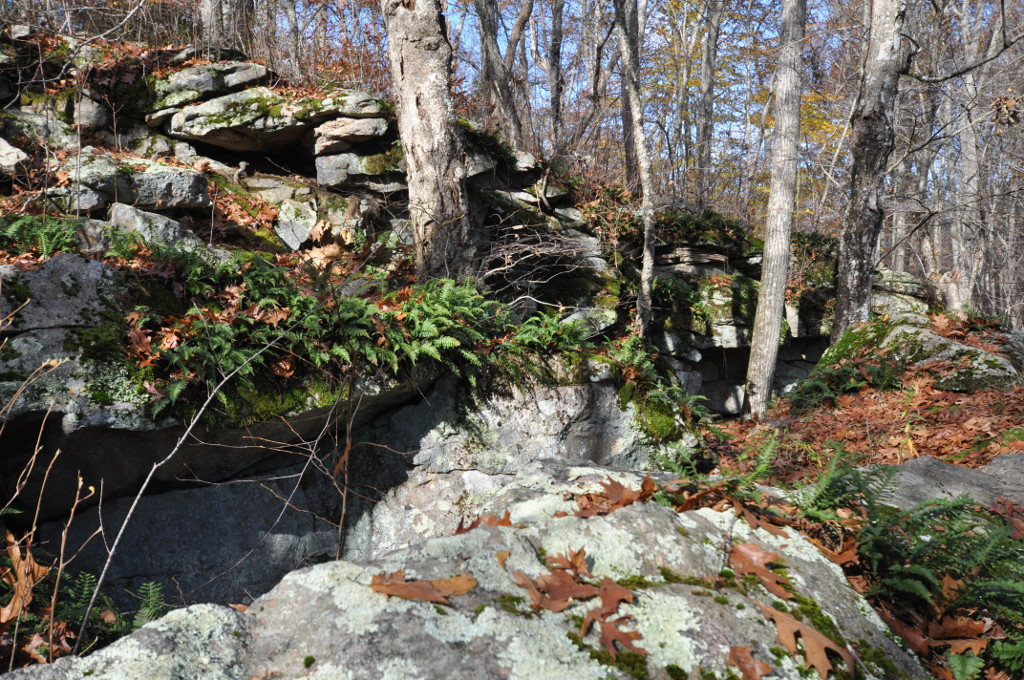

- Location within Rhode Island Location within the United States
- Location: Maxson Hill Rd., Hopkinton, Rhode Island
- Coordinates: 41°26′19″N 71°46′32″W
- Area: 0.25 acres (0.10 ha)
- NRHP reference No.: 77000011
- Added to NRHP: August 12, 1977

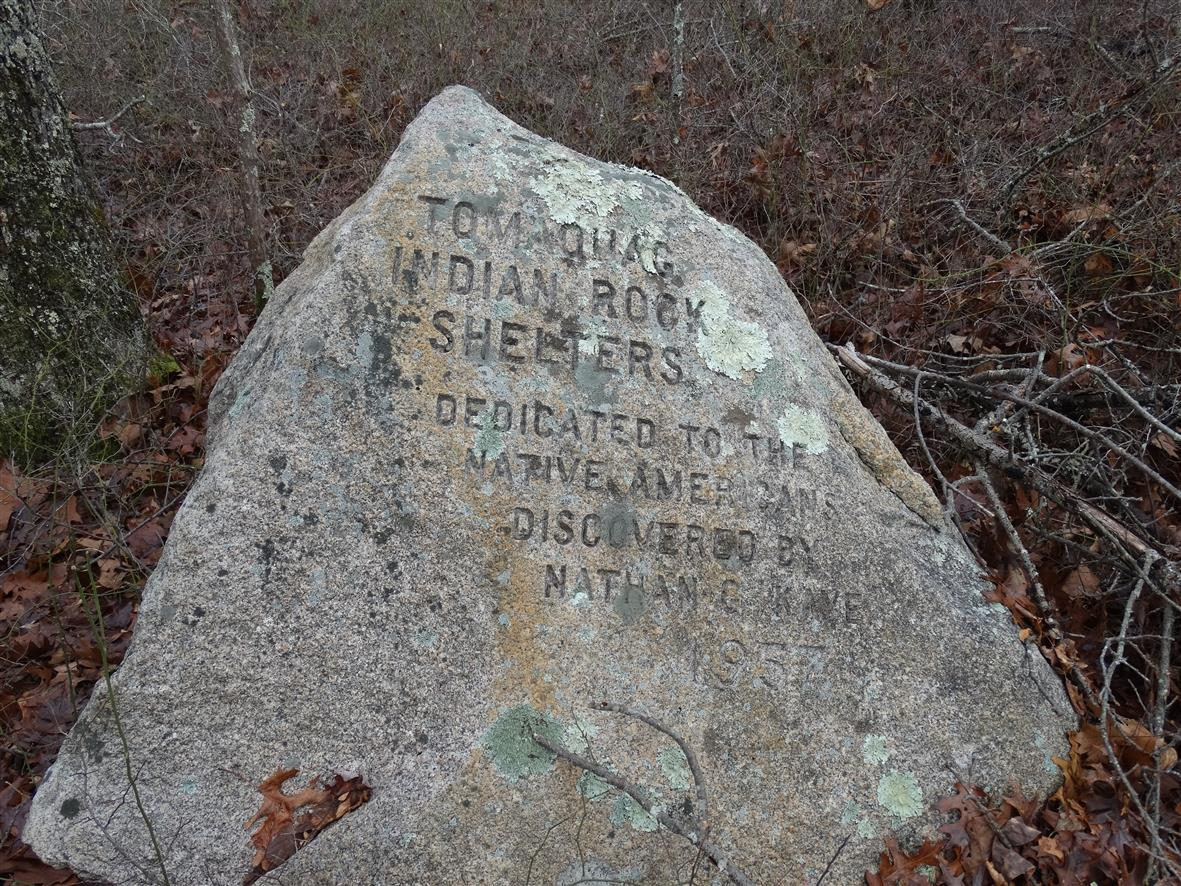
Tomaquag Rock Shelters

The Tomaquag Rock Shelters (RI-HP-1) are a prehistoric rock shelter site off Maxson Hill Road (formerly Burdickville Road) in Hopkinton, Rhode Island. The shelters are located under two east-facing granite outcrops in the valley drained by Tomaquag Brook. Nathan Kaye discovered the shelters in the late 1950s. Materials recovered from test excavations resulted in dating one shelter to 800 BC and the other to AD 800. Materials recovered include projectile points, stone knives, and evidence of stone tool construction. Both sites included evidence pointing to the presence of a fire pit.

The shelters were added to the National Register of Historic Places in 1977.

In 1982, Nathan Kaye gave the shelters to the State of Rhode Island. In 1996, the State Properties Committee entered into a "Park Use Agreement" with the Town of Hopkinton to preserve the shelter site. The Hopkinton Planning Board entered a requirement that the cultural aspects of the shelter be protected in a Master Plan agreement with the developers of a proposed solar farm across the road from the site on January 4, 2019.

== See also ==
- National Register of Historic Places listings in Washington County, Rhode Island
