= Canonchet, Rhode Island =

Village in Hopkinton, Rhode Island, U.S.

Coordinates: 41°29′24″N 71°43′58″W

Canonchet (cuh-NON-chet) is a small village in the town of Hopkinton in the U.S. state of Rhode Island.

The hamlet developed as a mill village in the nineteenth century, generally centered on a mile segment of Canonchet Road. It was previously called Asheville (or Ashville). The "Canonchet Village Historic District" includes the main stretch of the community on Canonchet Road. The community is located due northeast of the center of Hopkinton and both Interstate 95 and Rhode Island Route 3 run through it. Interstate 95's Exit 2 is located in Canonchet. Canonchet is also the name of a Narragansett sachem in the area who was executed during King Philip's War.

Data from the 1920 U.S. Census listed the village's population as 124.
