= Black Farm =

Coordinates: 41°28′07″N 71°43′28″W

- U.S. National Register of Historic Places
- Location within Rhode Island Location within the United States
- Location: Hopkinton, Rhode Island
- Area: 264 acres (107 ha)
- NRHP reference No.: 95001268
- Added to NRHP: November 7, 1995

Black Farm, also known as the Isaac Collins Farm, is a historic farm in Hopkinton, Rhode Island bounded by Woodville Alton Road (Rhode Island Route 112) and Wood Road. The 264-acre (107 ha) plot was developed by John Collins beginning in 1710 and saw agricultural use for over 200 years. The main house dates to the late 18th century, and is a 1-1/2 story gambrel-roofed post-and-beam structure. Outbuildings include 19th century barns, a corn crib, and a guest cottage added in the 1930s. Set some distance off from this complex is the foundational remains of what was probably an ice house; it consists of granite blocks and is eight feet high.

The state of Rhode Island purchased the farm in 1991. A lot containing the farmstead complex was sold into private hands with a preservation easement, and the rest of the farm property is now conservation land. The farm was added to the National Register of Historic Places in 1995.

== See also ==
- National Register of Historic Places listings in Washington County, Rhode Island
