= Bradford, Rhode Island =

Census-designated place in Rhode Island, United States

- CDP
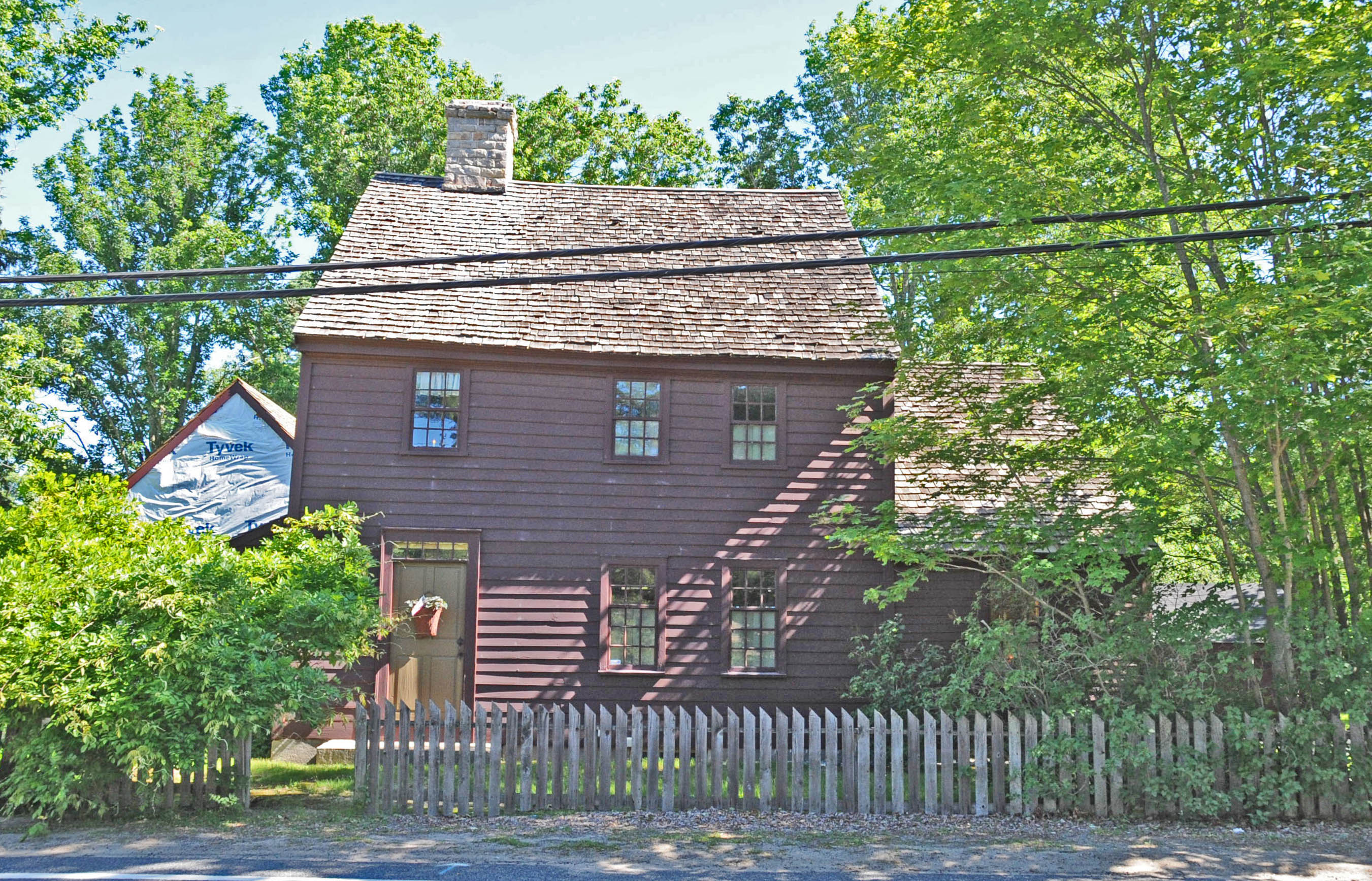
- Solomon P. Wells House in the historic district

- Location in the state of Rhode Island
- Coordinates: 41°24′2″N 71°44′51″W
- Country: United States
- State: Rhode Island
- County: Washington

Area
  - Total: 1.83 sq mi (4.75 km^{2})
  - Land: 1.82 sq mi (4.71 km^{2})
  - Water: 0.015 sq mi (0.04 km^{2})
- Elevation: 39 ft (12 m)

Population (2020)
  - Total: 1,457
  - Density: 801.7/sq mi (309.55/km^{2})
- Time zone: UTC-5 (Eastern (EST))
  - Summer (DST): UTC-4 (EDT)
- ZIP code: 02808
- Area code: 401
- FIPS code: 44-08020
- GNIS feature ID: 1217668

- Bradford Village Historic District
- U.S. National Register of Historic Places
- U.S. Historic district
- Location within Rhode Island Location within the United States
- Interactive map showing the location for Bradford Village Historic District
- Location: Westerly and Hopkinton
- Built: 1732
- Architect: Sherman, R.A., Sons & Co.
- Architectural style: Bungalow/Craftsman, Tudor Revival, Greek Revival
- NRHP reference No.: 96000573
- Added to NRHP: May 30, 1996

Bradford is a census-designated place (CDP) and historic district in the towns of Westerly and Hopkinton in Washington County, Rhode Island, United States. As of the 2020 census, Bradford had a population of 1,457. The Bradford Village Historic District was listed on the National Register of Historic Places in 1996 as a 224-acre (91 ha) area including 149 contributing buildings, one other contributing site, and one other contributing structure. The CDP as defined by the United States Census Bureau is located only in Westerly.

Bradford was named for Bradford, West Yorkshire, England.

== Geography ==
Bradford is located at 41°24′2″N 71°44′51″W (41.400657, -71.747607).

According to the United States Census Bureau, the village has a total area of 4.9 km^{2} (1.9 sq mi), all land.

== Demographics ==
Historical population
Census	Pop.	Note	%±
2020	1,457		—
U.S. Decennial Census

=== 2020 census ===
The 2020 United States census counted 1,457 people, 556 households, and 312 families in Bradford. The population density was 801.9 per square mile (309.6/km^{2}). There were 580 housing units at an average density of 319.2 units per square mile (123.2 units/km^{2}). The racial makeup was 84.76% (1,235) white or European American (83.73% non-Hispanic white), 1.58% (23) black or African-American, 2.06% (30) Native American or Alaska Native, 2.26% (33) Asian, 0.27% (4) Pacific Islander or Native Hawaiian, 1.51% (22) from other races, and 7.55% (110) from two or more races. Hispanic or Latino of any race was 3.64% (53) of the population.

Of the 556 households, 28.4% had children under the age of 18; 47.8% were married couples living together; 26.1% had a female householder with no spouse or partner present. 23.4% of households consisted of individuals and 9.9% had someone living alone who was 65 years of age or older. The average household size was 2.4 and the average family size was 2.9. The percent of those with a bachelor's degree or higher was estimated to be 18.1% of the population.

22.1% of the population was under the age of 18, 8.6% from 18 to 24, 26.0% from 25 to 44, 31.4% from 45 to 64, and 11.8% who were 65 years of age or older. The median age was 39.6 years. For every 100 females, the population had 95.3 males. For every 100 females ages 18 and older, there were 97.4 males.

The 2016–2020 5-year American Community Survey estimates show that the median household income was $64,737 (with a margin of error of +/- $37,689) and the median family income was $83,750 (+/- $14,858). Males had a median income of $38,711 (+/- $11,469). The median income for those above 16 years old was $33,417 (+/- $11,630). Approximately, 13.5% of families and 18.3% of the population were below the poverty line, including 59.6% of those under the age of 18 and 0.0% of those ages 65 or over.

=== 2000 census ===
As of the census of 2000, there were 1,497 people, 482 households, and 397 families residing in the village. The population density was 795.0/mi^{2} (307.0/km^{2}). There were 496 housing units at an average density of 263.4 units per square mile (101.7 units/km^{2}). The racial makeup of the village was 96.33% White, 0.67% African American, 0.73% American Indian, 0.60% Asian, 0.40% from other races, and 1.27% from two or more races. Hispanic or Latino were 1.94% of the population.

There were 482 households, out of which 51.0% had children under the age of 18 living with them, 59.5% were married couples living together, 16.6% had a female householder with no husband present, and 17.6% were non-families. 13.5% of all households were made up of individuals, and 4.4% had someone living alone who was 65 years of age or older. The average household size was 3.10 and the average family size was 3.39.

In the village, the population was spread out, with 35.7% under the age of 18, 7.1% from 18 to 24, 34.1% from 25 to 44, 15.9% from 45 to 64, and 7.2% who were 65 years of age or older. The median age was 30 years. For every 100 females, there were 103.4 males. For every 100 females age 18 and over, there were 97.3 males.

The median income for a household in the village was $42,130, and the median income for a family was $40,370. Males had a median income of $36,250 versus $24,353 for females. The per capita income for the village was $14,004. About 12.4% of families and 13.1% of the population were below the poverty line, including 17.4% of those under age 18 and none of those age 65 or over.

== Environmental contamination ==
Bradford is a working-class village in southwest Rhode Island where the Bradford Dyeing Association (BDA) has operated for nearly 100 years. BDA is the largest producer of battle dress uniform fabrics to the U.S. Dept. of Defense.

In violation of the federal Clean Air and Clean Water Acts, the BDA plant polluted the Pawcatuck River and fouled the local air. The RI DEM (Department of Environmental Management) was not responding to local complaints about the contamination so the Bradford Coalition 2 Stop Pollution, a community group of homeowners and tenants, lobbied to reduce BDA's pollution.

A civil lawsuit was successfully filed in 2005 in collaboration with the TAC (Toxic Action Center), RIPIRG (Rhode Island Public Interest Research Group) and Sierra Club. The BDA settled in November 2005, agreeing to pay $150,000 in fines and make improvements on the textile mill to reduce pollution. The plant will build taller smokestacks, install a soot-reducing device and better manage its sewage sludge pond.

“State and federal environmental regulators had given BDA a free pass for years,” explained RIPIRG Advocate Matthew Auten. “By requiring the company to significantly upgrade its air pollution and water pollution controls, this settlement demonstrates the important role that citizens can and often must play in enforcing our environmental laws.”

In 2011, BDA's success was already in decline and as of 2019, the association was shut down and site sold.

== See also ==
- National Register of Historic Places listings in Washington County, Rhode Island
