= Upper Rockville Mill =

- U.S. National Register of Historic Places
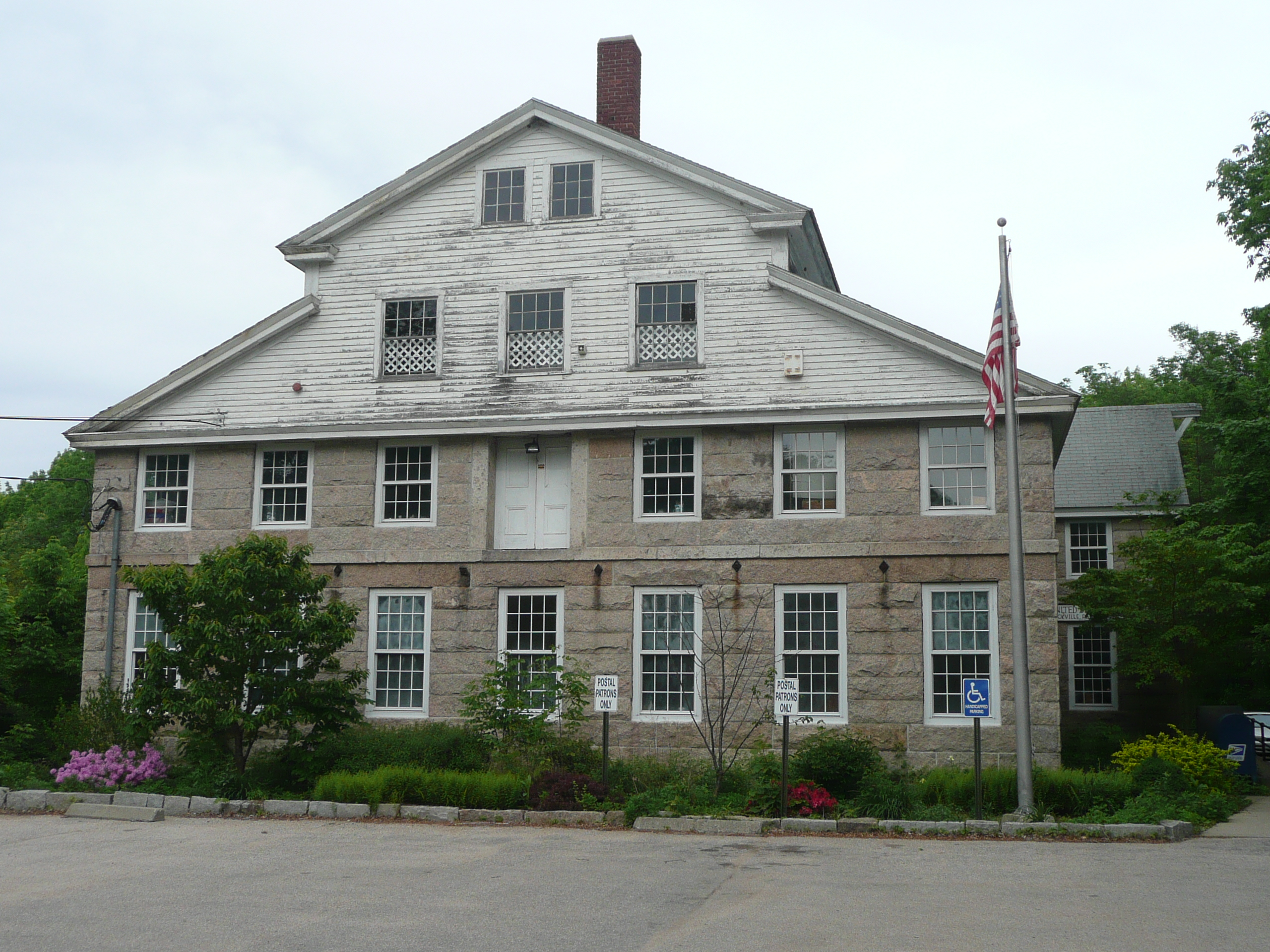

- Location within Rhode Island Location within the United States
- Location: Hopkinton, Rhode Island
- Coordinates: 41.52026°N 71.76027°W
- Built: 1844
- Architectural style: Greek Revival
- NRHP reference No.: 06000552
- Added to NRHP: July 5, 2006

The Upper Rockville Mill is a historic mill complex at 332 Canonchet Road in Hopkinton, Rhode Island. The complex occupies about 0.5 acres (0.20 ha) of land, and includes two buildings, the site of a third, and their associated waterworks, including Wincheck Pond and surviving raceway elements. The two buildings are the main mill building, a 3-1/2 story stone structure built 1844–45, and a two-story auxiliary building added in the 1860s. The Rockville Manufacturing Company operated the mill and was a major employer and land owner in the area for much of the 19th century. The property was operated by a variety of textile concerns until 1953, when it was briefly owned by the Boy Scouts of America (BSA), whose Camp Yawgoog was affected by the mill's water rights. The BSA retained the water rights and sold off the rest of the property.

The mill complex was listed on the National Register of Historic Places in 2006.

== See also ==
- National Register of Historic Places listings in Washington County, Rhode Island
