= Hopkinton City Historic District =

Historic district in Rhode Island, United States

- U.S. National Register of Historic Places
- U.S. Historic district
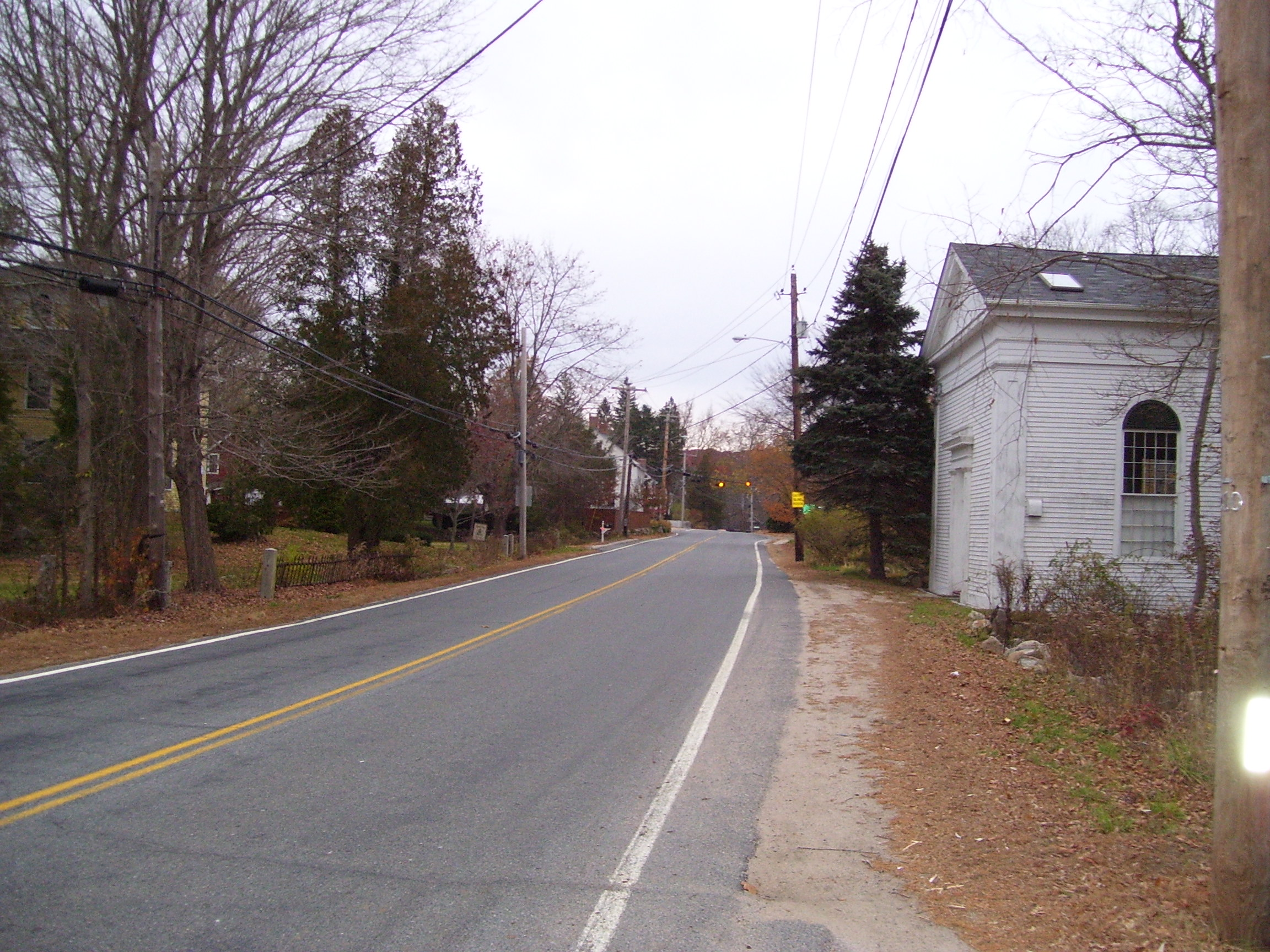
- Hopkinton City Historic District in 2008

- Location within Rhode Island Location within the United States
- Location: Hopkinton, Rhode Island
- Coordinates: 41°27′40″N 71°46′39″W
- NRHP reference No.: 74000010
- Added to NRHP: May 1, 1974

Hopkinton City Historic District is a historic district encompassing the town center of Hopkinton, Rhode Island. The district is centered on the junction of Rhode Island Route 3 with Woodville Road, Clark Falls Road, Townhouse Road, and Old Rockville Road. It is a relatively modest town center, with twenty residences, two church buildings (one of which is no longer used as a church), the town hall, and post office. The most imposing house in the district is the Thurston-Wells House, a c. 1800 structure which was given a Victorian treatment in the mid-19th century; it stands opposite the 1836 Greek Revival First Baptist Church. The area was a major stop on the stagecoach route (now Route 3), and was eclipsed in the 20th century by the construction of Interstate 95, which passes nearby.

The district was added to the National Register of Historic Places in 1974.

== Gallery ==
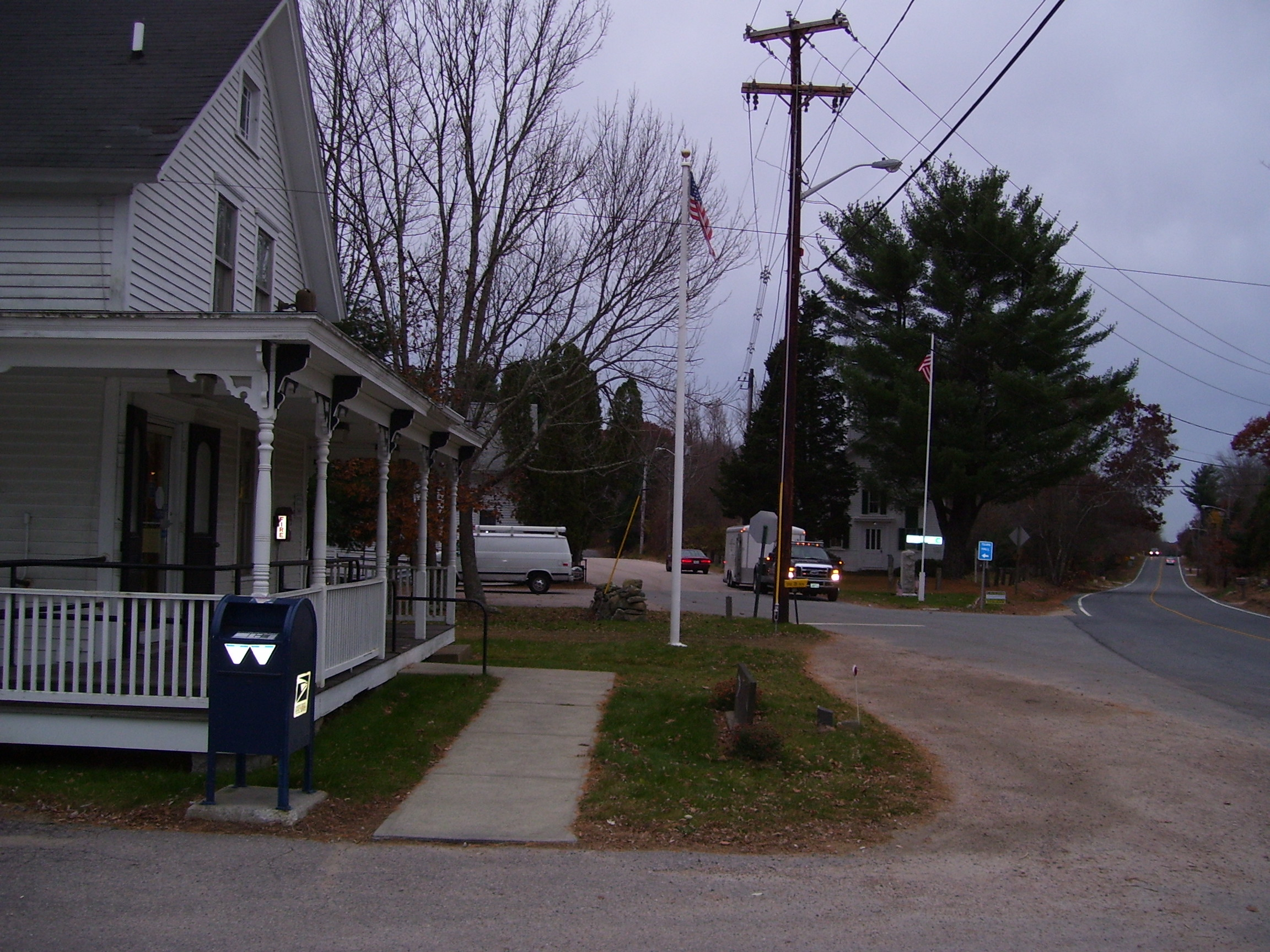
Hopkinton City Historic District in 2008

== See also ==
- National Register of Historic Places listings in Washington County, Rhode Island
