= Hopkinton, Rhode Island =

Coordinates: 41°27′40″N 71°46′39″W

Hopkinton
- Town
- Hopkinton, Rhode Island
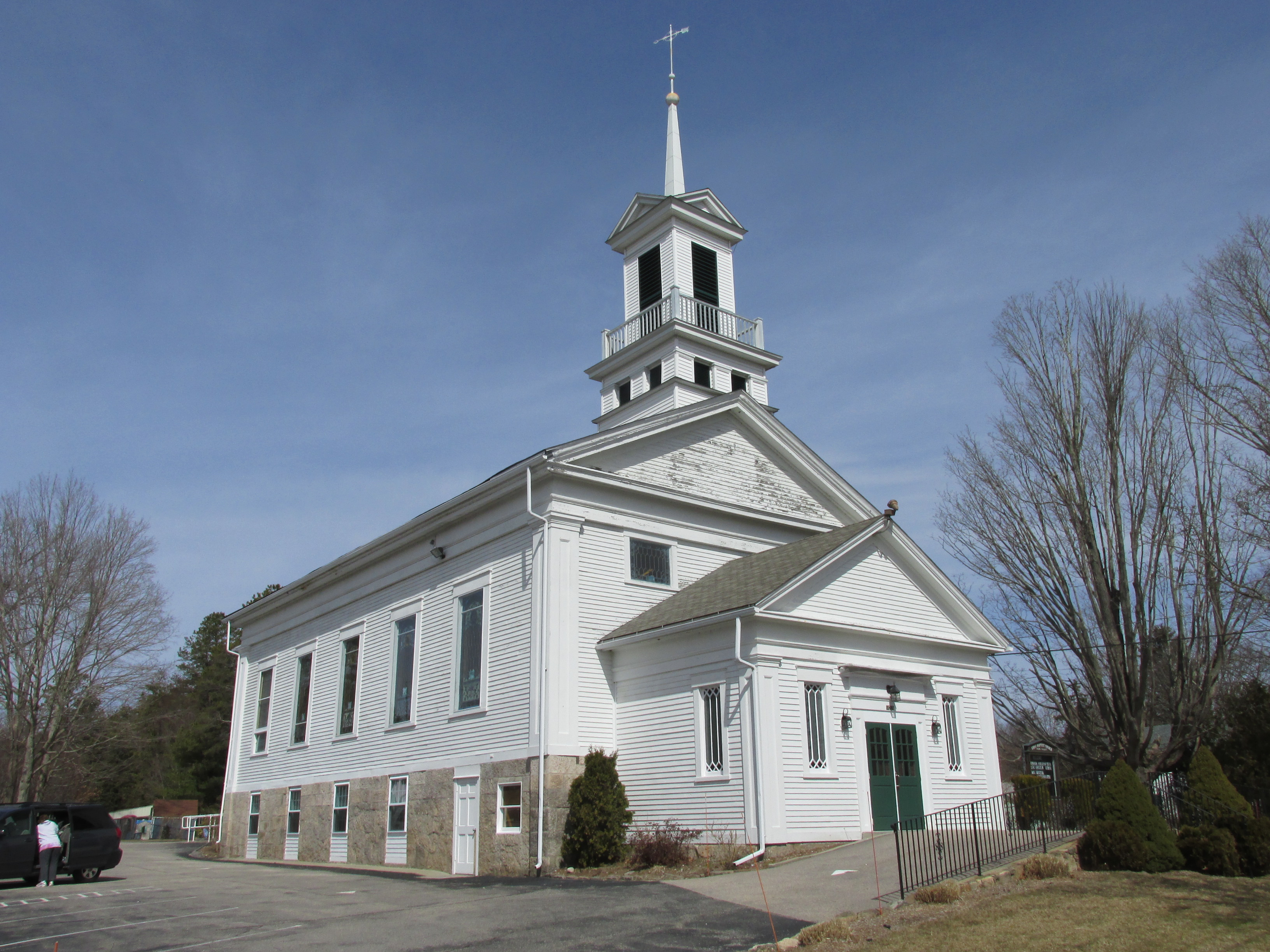
- First Baptist Church, Hope Valley

- Coat of arms Logo
- Interactive map of Hopkinton
- Country: United States
- State: Rhode Island
- County: Washington

Government
  - Town Council: Stephen Moffitt; Michael Geary; Robert Marvel; Scott Bill Hirst; Sharon Davis
  - Town Clerk: Elizabeth J. Cook-Martin

Area
  - Total: 44.0 sq mi (114.0 km^{2})
  - Land: 42.9 sq mi (111.0 km^{2})
  - Water: 1.1 sq mi (2.8 km^{2})

Population (2020)
  - Total: 8,398
  - Density: 196/sq mi (75.7/km^{2})
- Time zone: UTC-5 (Eastern (EST))
  - Summer (DST): UTC-4 (EDT)
- ZIP codes: 02804 (Ashaway), 02808 (Bradford), 02832 (Hope Valley), 02833 (Hopkinton), 02873 (Rockville)
- Area code: 401
- Website: https://www.hopkintonri.gov/

Hopkinton is a town in Washington County, Rhode Island, United States. The population was 8,398 at the 2020 census.

== History ==
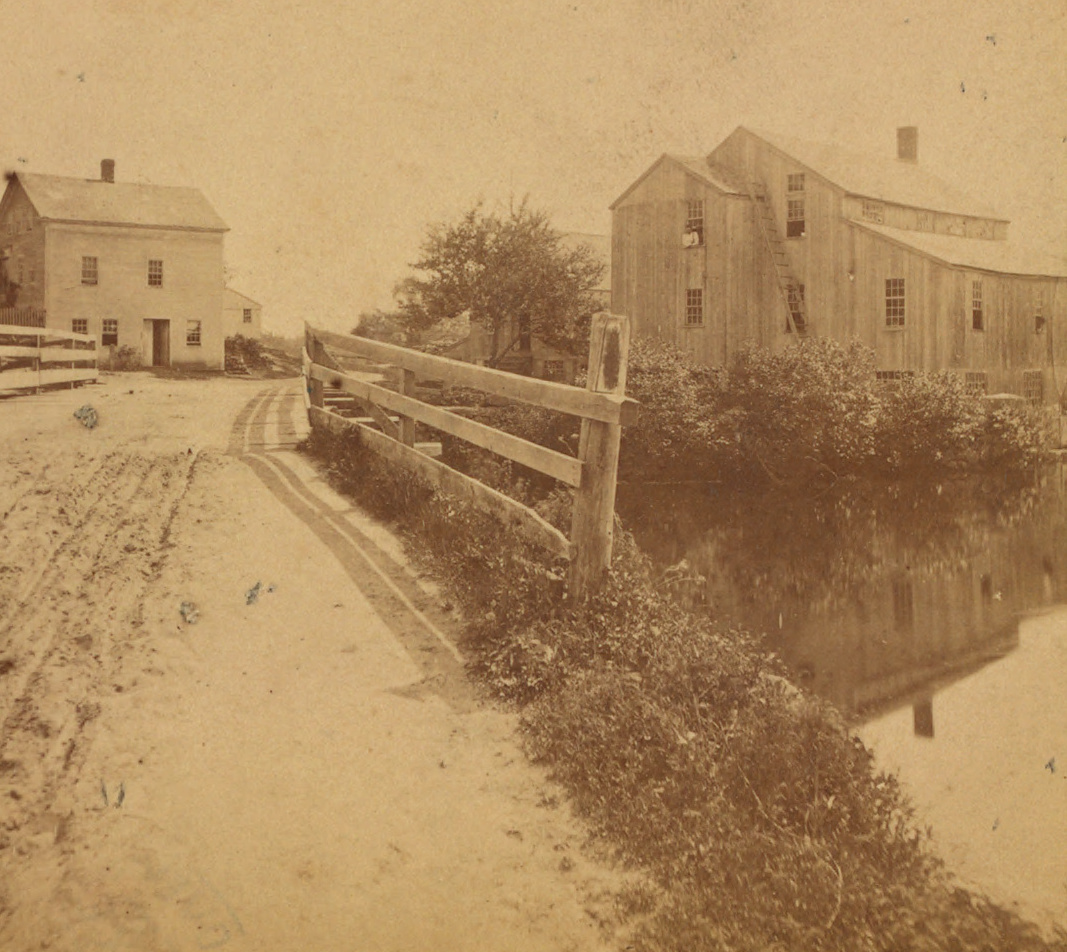
View of Hopkinton, c. 1860–1885

Hopkinton is named after Stephen Hopkins, a signer of the Declaration of Independence who was governor of the Colony of Rhode Island and Providence Plantations when the town was partitioned from Westerly and incorporated in 1757. Hopkinton once featured a number of industrial villages, such as Locustville, Moscow, Centerville, and Wood River Iron Works, each being named after the mill which they surrounded. Today only Hope Valley, Rockville, Ashaway, and Bradford are recognized with a post office. The town hall is located in the village of Hopkinton City, which was once a stagecoach hub.

== Geography ==
Hopkinton is found at 41.461 N latitude and 71.778 W longitude and borders Richmond and Charlestown. It is on the Pawcatuck River and the Ashaway River on the Connecticut border.

According to the United States Census Bureau, the town has a total area of 44.1 square miles (114 km^{2}), of which 43.0 square miles (111 km^{2}) is land and 1.1 square miles (2.8 km^{2}) (2.58%) is water.

Hopkinton is the southernmost town along Rhode Island's portion of Interstate 95 and is the first Rhode Island town that northbound travelers encounter.

=== Villages ===
Hope Valley in the north and Ashaway in the south are the two primary villages in Hopkinton. Two of the four elementary schools in the Chariho Regional School District are located in Hopkinton, one in Hope Valley and one in Ashaway. Other villages that are located in Hopkinton include Barberville, Burdickville, Canonchet, Centerville, Hopkinton (Hopkinton City), Locustville, Moscow, Rockville, and Woodville. Almost all were formed from mills on rivers. Hope Valley, Ashaway, and Hopkinton are census-designated places (CDPs).

== Demographics ==
Historical population
| Census | Pop. | Note | %± |
|---|---|---|---|
| 1790 | 2,462 | | — |
| 1800 | 2,276 | | −7.6% |
| 1810 | 1,774 | | −22.1% |
| 1820 | 1,821 | | 2.6% |
| 1830 | 1,777 | | −2.4% |
| 1840 | 1,726 | | −2.9% |
| 1850 | 2,477 | | 43.5% |
| 1860 | 2,738 | | 10.5% |
| 1870 | 2,682 | | −2.0% |
| 1880 | 2,952 | | 10.1% |
| 1890 | 2,864 | | −3.0% |
| 1900 | 2,602 | | −9.1% |
| 1910 | 2,324 | | −10.7% |
| 1920 | 2,316 | | −0.3% |
| 1930 | 2,823 | | 21.9% |
| 1940 | 3,230 | | 14.4% |
| 1950 | 3,676 | | 13.8% |
| 1960 | 4,174 | | 13.5% |
| 1970 | 5,392 | | 29.2% |
| 1980 | 6,406 | | 18.8% |
| 1990 | 6,873 | | 7.3% |
| 2000 | 7,836 | | 14.0% |
| 2010 | 8,188 | | 4.5% |
| 2020 | 8,398 | | 2.6% |
U.S. Decennial Census

As of the census of 2020, there were 8,398 people and 3,415 households in the town. The population density was 195.3 inhabitants per square mile (75.4/km^{2}). There were 3,613 housing units in the town. The racial makeup of the town was 92.71% White, 0.42% African American, 0.74% American Indian, 0.64% Asian, 0.77% from other races, and 4.72% from two or more races. Hispanic or Latino of any race were 2.55% of the population.

There were 3,415 households, out of which 30.4% had children under the age of 18 living with them, 58.6% were married couples living together, 23.2% had a female householder with no spouse present, and 13.0% had a male householder with no spouse present. 7.3% of all households were made up of individuals, and 3.1% had someone living alone who was 65 years of age or older. The average household size was 2.46 and the average family size was 2.83.

The population was spread out, with 17.8% under the age of 18, 9.5% from 18 to 24, 20.5% from 25 to 44, 33.7% from 45 to 64, and 18.5% who were 65 years of age or older. The median age was 48 years.

The median income for a household in the town was $97,576, and the median income for a family was $104,615. The per capita income for the town was $45,865. About 5.9% of the population were below the poverty line, including 2.1% of those under age 18 and 9.8% of those age 65 or over. As of 2017, the largest self-identified ancestry groups or ethnic groups in Hopkinton were:

| Largest ancestries (2017) | Percent |
|---|---|
| English | 24.8% |
| Irish | 22.8% |
| Italian | 18.6% |
| German | 10.5% |
| French (except Basque) | 10.2% |
| Polish | 6.5% |
| Portuguese | 4.5% |
| American | 3.6% |
| Scottish | 3.6% |
| Swedish | 3.3% |

== Politics ==
Hopkinton is located in the 34th Senate District, represented by Republican Elaine J. Morgan, and in the 38th District in the Rhode Island House of Representatives by Democrat Brian Patrick Kennedy. At the Federal level, Hopkinton is located in Rhode Island's 2nd Congressional District, which is currently represented by Seth Magaziner (D). Hopkinton is represented by U.S. Senator John F. Reed (D) and U.S. Senator Sheldon Whitehouse (D).

== Notable people ==
- Prudence Crandall taught the first desegregated classroom in the United States; born in Hopkinton
- Edward Lee Greene, botanist; born in Hopkinton
- Benjamin Randall, Wisconsin State Assemblyman; born in Hopkinton
- Dorcas James Spencer (1841–1933), social activist, writer
- John Wilbur, Quaker minister; born in Hopkinton

== National Historic Places ==
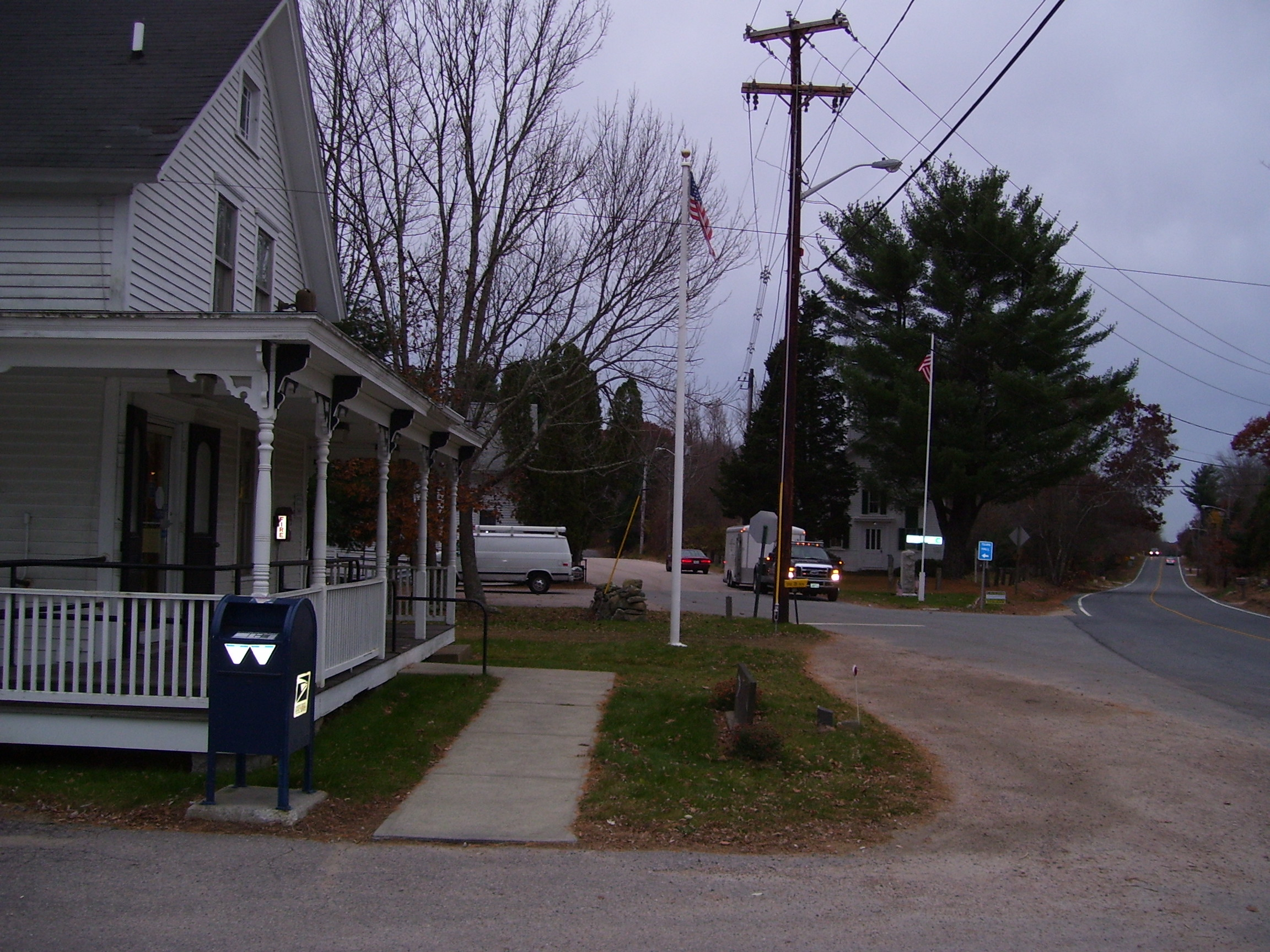
Hopkinton City Historic District in 2008

- Black Farm
- Bradford Village Historic District in Hopkinton and Westerly
- Hope Valley Historic District
- Hopkinton City Historic District
- Tomaquag Rock Shelters
- Upper Rockville Mill
- Wyoming Village Historic District

== See also ==
- Yawgoog Scout Reservation
