= List of counties in Rhode Island =

Counties of Rhode Island
- Location: State of Rhode Island
- Number: 5
- Populations: 50,001 (Bristol) – 678,179 (Providence)
- Areas: 24 square miles (62 km^{2}) (Bristol) – 409 square miles (1,060 km^{2}) (Providence)
- Government: County government (defunct since 1846)
- Subdivisions: Cities, towns, villages, unincorporated communities, census-designated places

There are five counties in the U.S. state of Rhode Island. Rhode Island is tied with Hawaii for having the second-fewest counties of any U.S. state (only Delaware has fewer, with three counties). Although Rhode Island is divided into counties, it does not have any local government at the county level. Instead, local governance is provided by the eight cities and thirty-one towns. Counties in Rhode Island have had no governmental functions since 1846 other than as court administrative and sheriff corrections boundaries which are part of state government.

Within Rhode Island, Washington County is colloquially referred to as South County.

The colony of Rhode Island was established in the 17th century. It was the first of the thirteen original American colonies to declare independence from British rule in 1776, during the American Revolution, and the last to ratify the Constitution. The counties were all established before the Declaration of Independence.

The Federal Information Processing Standard (FIPS) code, which is used by the United States government to uniquely identify states and counties, is provided with each entry. Rhode Island's code is 44, which when combined with any county code would be written as 44XXX. The FIPS code for each county links to census data for that county.

== Alphabetical list ==
County	FIPS code	County town	Est.	Origin	Etymology	Population	Area	Map
Bristol County	001	Bristol	February 17, 1747	Created from land gained from Bristol County, Massachusetts, after resolution of a boundary dispute between the two colonies.	City of Bristol, England	50,001	24 sq mi (62 km^{2})	State map highlighting Bristol County
Kent County	003	East Greenwich	June 11, 1750	Created from part of Providence County.	County of Kent, England	173,495	168 sq mi (435 km^{2})	State map highlighting Kent County
Newport County	005	Newport	June 22, 1703	Formed as Rhode Island County in 1703. Renamed Newport County in 1729	Town of Newport, Essex, England	83,051	102 sq mi (264 km^{2})	State map highlighting Newport County
Providence County	007	Providence	June 22, 1703	Formed in 1703 as Providence Plantations County. Renamed Providence County in 1729	Divine Providence, a concept reflecting the religious nature of colonial founder Roger Williams	678,179	409 sq mi (1,059 km^{2})	State map highlighting Providence County
Washington County	009	South Kingstown	June 16, 1729	Formed in 1729 as Kings County from part of Providence Plantations County. Renamed Washington County in 1781.	George Washington, American Revolutionary War general and first President of the United States	129,795	329 sq mi (852 km^{2})	State map highlighting Washington County

== Racial / Ethnic Profile of counties in Rhode Island (2020 Census) ==
Racial / Ethnic Profile of counties in Rhode Island (2020 Census)
Following is a table of counties in Rhode Island by race/ethnicity. The majority racial/ethnic group is coded per the key below.

Majority minority with no dominant group
Majority White
Majority Black
Majority Hispanic
Majority Asian
Majority Native American

Racial and ethnic composition of counties in Rhode Island (2020 Census) (NH = Non-Hispanic) Note: the US Census treats Hispanic/Latino as an ethnic category. This table excludes Latinos from the racial categories and assigns them to a separate category. Hispanics/Latinos may be of any race.
County	Location of County	Total Population	White alone (NH)	%	Black or African American alone (NH)	%	Native American or Alaska Native alone (NH)	%	Asian alone (NH)	%	Pacific Islander alone (NH)	%	Other race alone (NH)	%	Mixed race or Multiracial (NH)	%	Hispanic or Latino (any race)	%
Bristol		50,793	44,671	87.95%	732	1.44%	85	0.17%	1,279	2.52%	1	0.00%	169	0.33%	1,913	3.77%	1,943	3.83%
Kent		170,363	144,761	84.97%	2,889	1.70%	364	0.21%	4,830	2.84%	32	0.02%	767	0.45%	7,055	4.14%	9,665	5.67%
Newport		85,643	70,914	82.80%	2,645	3.09%	265	0.31%	1,543	1.80%	49	0.06%	599	0.70%	4,036	4.71%	5,592	6.53%
Providence		660,741	378,615	57.30%	47,652	7.21%	1,882	0.28%	28,110	4.25%	190	0.03%	9,367	1.42%	34,602	5.24%	160,323	24.26%
Washington		129,839	115,089	88.64%	1,468	1.13%	917	0.71%	2,605	2.01%	48	0.04%	490	0.38%	4,644	3.58%	4,578	3.53%
