= Hope Valley, Rhode Island =

Census-designated place in Rhode Island, United States

- Census-designated place
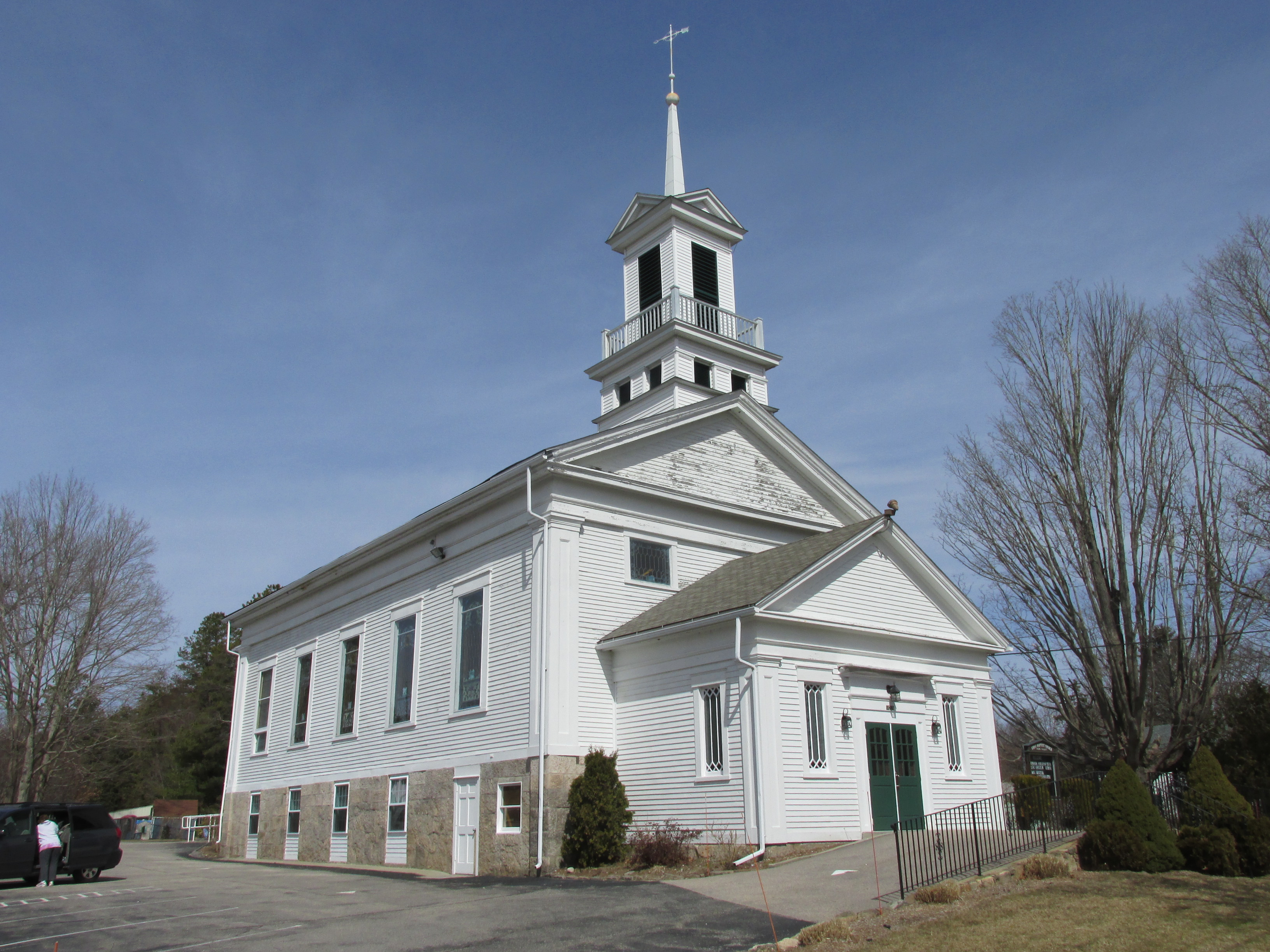
- First Baptist Church

- Location in the state of Rhode Island
- Coordinates: 41°30′27″N 71°42′59″W
- Country: United States
- State: Rhode Island
- County: Washington

Area
  - Total: 3.53 sq mi (9.13 km^{2})
  - Land: 3.32 sq mi (8.60 km^{2})
  - Water: 0.20 sq mi (0.53 km^{2})
- Elevation: 85 ft (26 m)

Population (2020)
  - Total: 1,870
  - Density: 563.0/sq mi (217.37/km^{2})
- Time zone: UTC−5 (Eastern (EST))
  - Summer (DST): UTC−4 (EDT)
- ZIP Code: 02832
- Area code: 401
- FIPS code: 44-34660
- GNIS feature ID: 1217875

- Hope Valley Historic District
- U.S. National Register of Historic Places
- U.S. Historic district
- Location within Rhode Island Location within the United States Location within the United States
- Location: Main St., Hopkinton, Rhode Island
- Built: 1770
- NRHP reference No.: 04000654
- Added to NRHP: July 3, 2004

Hope Valley is a village and census-designated place (CDP) in the town of Hopkinton, Rhode Island, United States. As of the 2020 census, Hope Valley had a population of 1,870. Hope Valley is the largest village in Hopkinton, and the town's principal commercial center. While the village of Hope Valley is located in Hopkinton, its ZIP Code, 02832, extends into the neighboring town of Richmond.

The central portion of the village was listed on the National Register of Historic Places in 2004 as the Hope Valley Historic District. The 183-acre (74 ha) historic district includes 134 contributing buildings and three other contributing structures.

== History ==
The earliest European-American settlement of the village site was by Hezekiah Carpenter, who arrived in 1770 and dammed the Wood River and built several small water-powered mills. His settlement was called Carpenter's Mills. Around 1818 a tannery was built at the site. The textile industry arrived in 1824, when Gardner Nichols and Russell Thayer bought the existing mills and began to operate them for carding of wool; fulling, coloring and finishing of cloth; and manufacture of textile machinery.

The formerly separate village of Locustville, which grew up along Brushy Brook, is now part of Hope Valley. A dam and mill were built at the site of Locustville in 1820. In the late 19th century the Locustville mill property was taken over by the Nichols and Langworthy Company, which had operated the Hope Valley mills since 1835.

There are conflicting versions of the origin of the village's name. The word "Hope" is the Rhode Island motto and used in various place names in Rhode Island. The phrase is used on the Rhode Island State Seal with an anchor because Roger Williams was inspired by the Biblical passage "hope is the anchor of the soul" in Hebrews, Verse 6:19. In 2008 a town historian told the Providence Journal that Gardner Nichols renamed the village from Carpenter's Mills to Hope Valley "because all of his hopes were centered" in the village. This version also appears in History of the State of Rhode Island.

== Geography ==
Hope Valley is located at 41°30′27″N 71°42′59″W (41.5075, -71.7164).

According to the United States Census Bureau, the CDP has a total area of 9.1 km^{2} (3.5 sq mi), of which 8.5 km^{2} (3.3 sq mi) is land and 0.5 km^{2} (0.19 sq mi) (5.43%) is water.

== Demographics ==
Historical population
Census	Pop.	Note	%±
2020	1,870		—
U.S. Decennial Census

=== 2020 census ===
The 2020 United States census counted 1,870 people, 723 households, and 568 families in Hope Valley. The population density was 562.9 people per square mile (217.3 people/km^{2}). There were 787 housing units at an average density of 236.9 units per square mile (91.5 units/km^{2}). The racial makeup was 91.6% (1,713) white or European American (91.07% non-Hispanic white), 0.64% (12) black or African-American, 0.43% (8) Native American or Alaska Native, 0.86% (16) Asian, 0.0% (0) Pacific Islander or Native Hawaiian, 1.5% (28) from other races, and 4.97% (93) from two or more races. Hispanic or Latino of any race was 2.57% (48) of the population.

Of the 723 households, 33.1% had children under the age of 18; 53.3% were married couples living together; 21.0% had a female householder with no spouse or partner present. Of households, 25.4% consisted of individuals and 11.3% had someone living alone who was 65 years of age or older. The average household size was 2.8 and the average family size was 2.9. The percent of those with a bachelor's degree or higher was estimated to be 14.2% of the population.

Of the population, 21.9% was under the age of 18, 6.8% from 18 to 24, 22.4% from 25 to 44, 32.7% from 45 to 64, and 16.1% who were 65 years of age or older. The median age was 44.0 years. For every 100 females, the population had 93.0 males. For every 100 females ages 18 and older, there were 90.4 males.

The 2016–2020 five-year American Community Survey estimates show that the median household income was $83,267 (with a margin of error of +/− $24,047) and the median family income was $84,009 (+/− $18,961). Males had a median income of $44,886 (+/− $22,899) versus $19,105 (+/− $7,789) for females. The median income for those above 16 years old was $30,526 (+/− $14,446). Approximately, 18.7% of families and 15.7% of the population were below the poverty line, including 26.3% of those under the age of 18 and 0.0% of those ages 65 or over.

=== 2000 census ===
As of the census of 2000, there were 1,649 people, 630 households, and 464 families residing in the CDP. The population density was 192.9 people/km^{2} (500 people/mi^{2}). There were 663 housing units at an average density of 77.6 units/km^{2} (201 units/mi^{2}). The racial makeup of the CDP was 97.03% White, 0.73% African American, 0.97% Native American, 0.18% Asian, 0.12% from other races, and 0.97% from two or more races. Hispanic or Latino of any race were 0.67% of the population.

There were 630 households, out of which 39.2% had children under the age of 18 living with them, 59.5% were married couples living together, 10.0% had a female householder with no husband present, and 26.3% were non-families. Of all households, 22.2% were made up of individuals, and 7.8% had someone living alone who was 65 years of age or older. The average household size was 2.62 and the average family size was 3.06.

In the CDP, the population was spread out, with 26.7% under the age of 18, 7.5% from 18 to 24, 31.6% from 25 to 44, 24.4% from 45 to 64, and 9.8% who were 65 years of age or older. The median age was 37 years. For every 100 females, there were 101.3 males. For every 100 females age 18 and over, there were 97.4 males.

The median income for a household in the CDP was $43,264, and the median income for a family was $47,857. Males had a median income of $33,462 versus $28,125 for females. The per capita income for the CDP was $18,925. About 2.9% of families and 3.8% of the population were below the poverty line, including 4.7% of those under the age of 18 and 5.7% of those 65 and older.

== Notable people ==
Prudence Crandall, who established a pioneering school for African-American girls, was born in 1803 in the area that is now Hope Valley. A granite marker erected in her memory stands in the village.

Hope Valley is also the hometown of country music singer Billy Gilman.

== See also ==
- National Register of Historic Places listings in Washington County, Rhode Island
