= Russillo =

Russillo is a surname. Notable people with the surname include:

- D. Thomas Russillo (1902–1978), American architect
- Michael Russillo (1905–2004), American politician from Nebraska and rear admiral in the U.S. Navy
- Ryen Russillo (born 1975), American sports journalist
