= Scouting in Rhode Island =

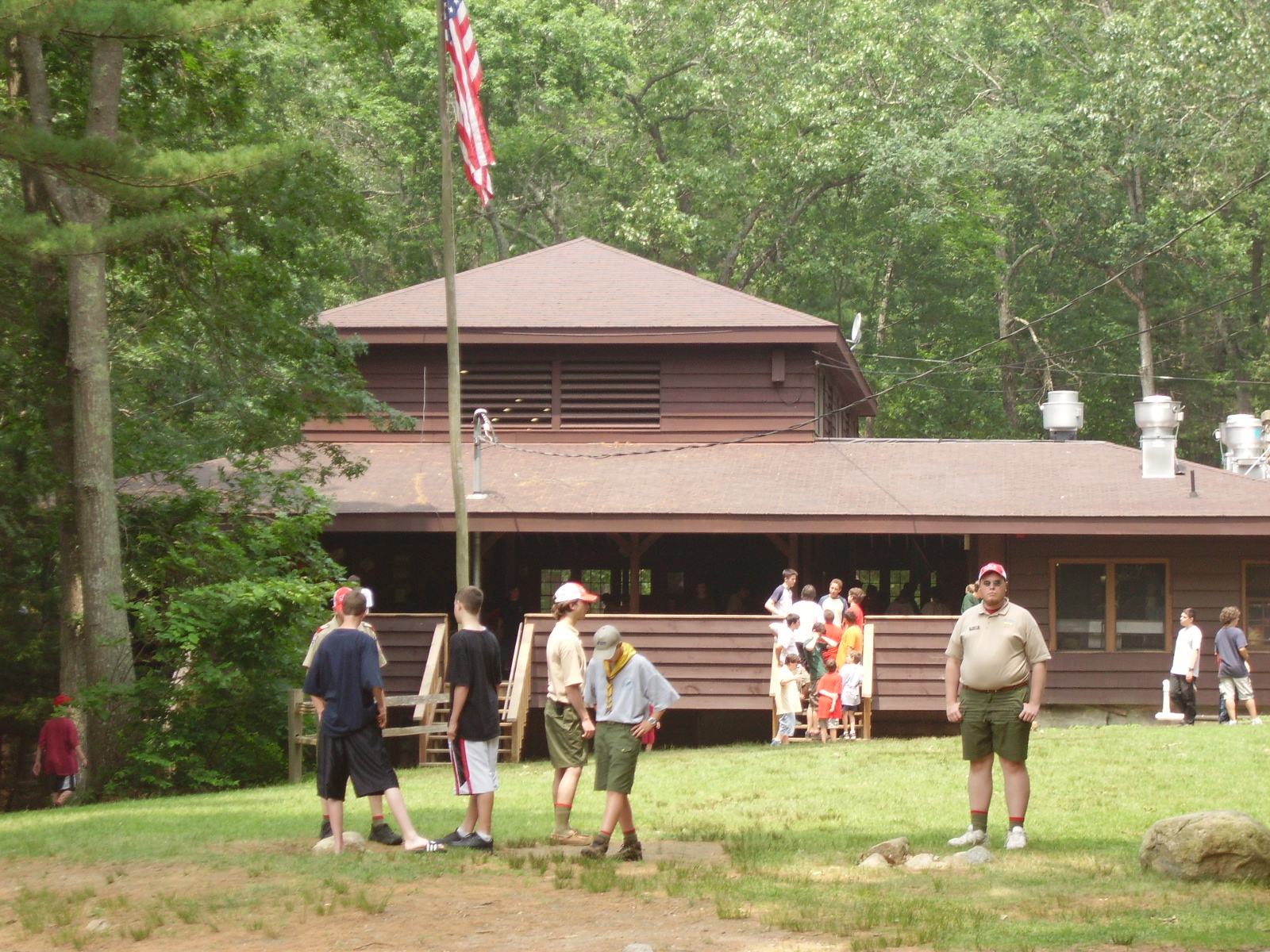
- Dining hall at Camp Medicine Bow, Yawgoog Scout Reservation

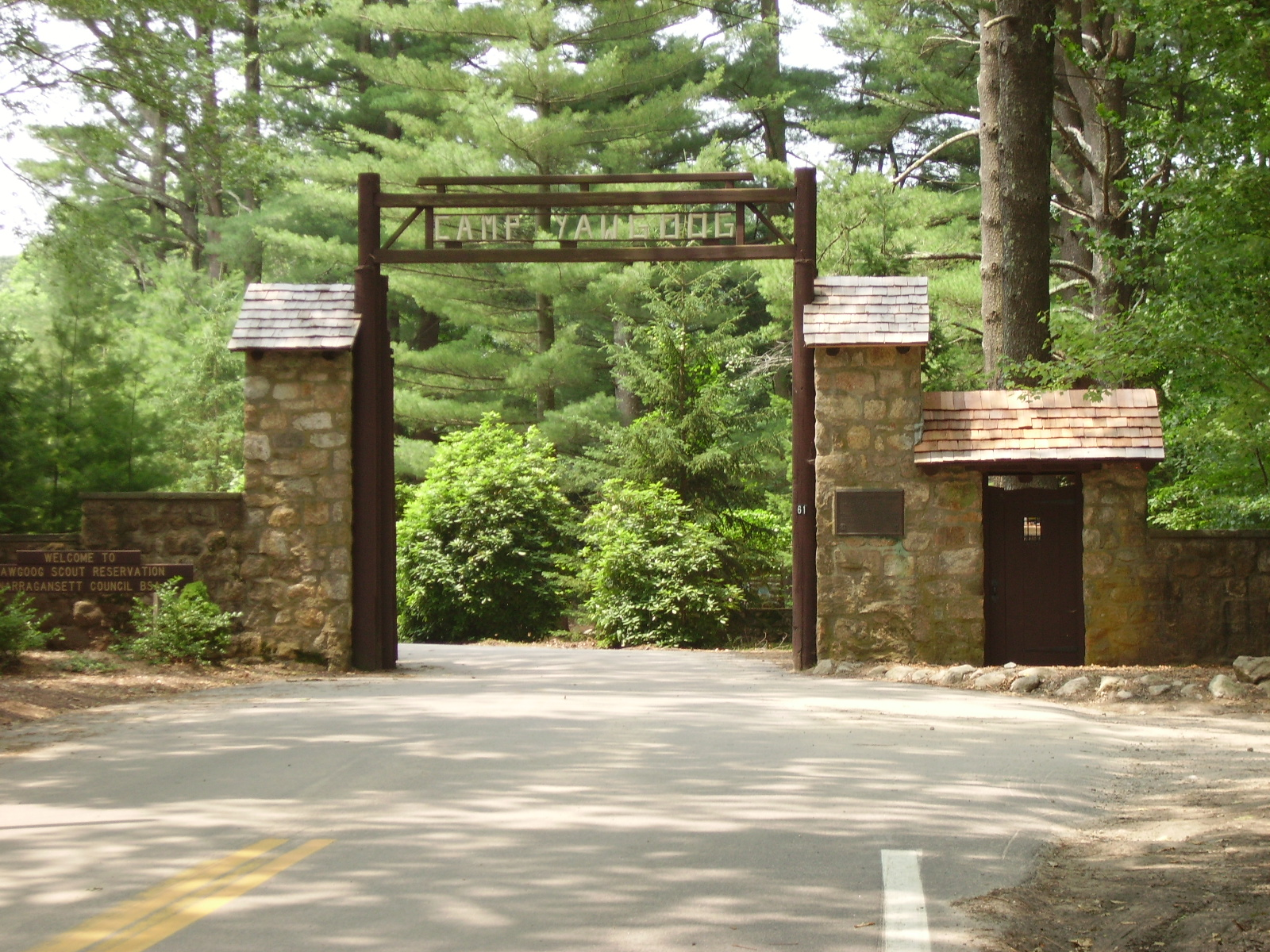
- Yawgoog gate

Scouting in Rhode Island has a long history, from the 1910s to the present day, serving thousands of youth in programs that suit the environment in which they live.

== Early history (1910–1950) ==
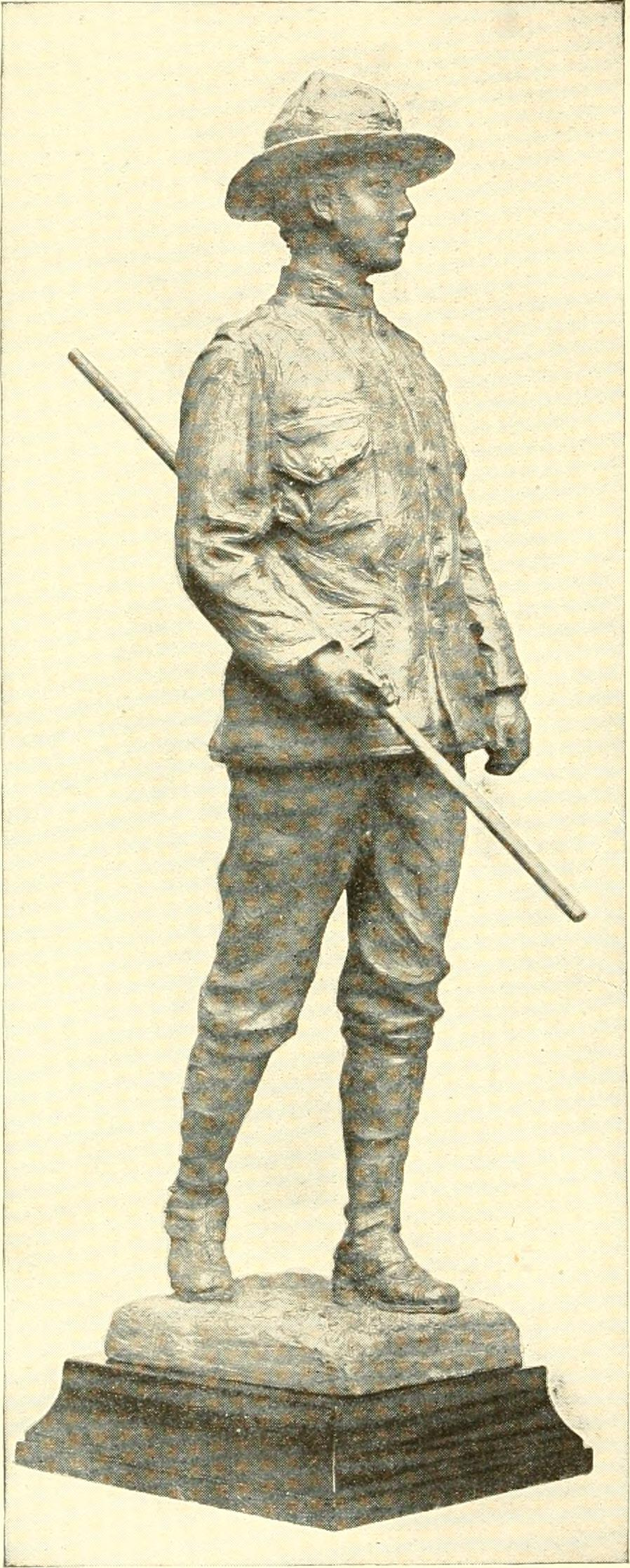
Bronze figure of Rhode Island Boy Scout (1920)

=== Rhode Island Boy Scouts ===
The Rhode Island Boy Scouts (RIBS), formerly American Boy Scouts of Rhode Island , was a Scouting organization in the United States from 1910 until its merger with the Boy Scouts of America (BSA) in 1917. RIBS still exists as a trustee organization.

=== Boy Scouts of America ===
In 1910 the First Providence Troop was organized in Washington Park. On October 24, 1910, the troop was formally recognized by Scout headquarters. Troop meetings were held at the Broad Street School. The first Scoutmaster was Herbert R. Dean, a retired Army general. The first charter listed sixty-four boys.

Four BSA councils were formed in the state. The first council, Providence Council (#546), was organized in 1916 based in Providence. The second was Pawtucket Council (#548) in 1917 and ended in 1920. From 1918 to 1924, Newport Council (#547) existed. In 1924, Woonsocket Council (#549) formed a council.

In 1917, Rhode Island Boy Scouts merged with Providence Council to form the Greater Providence Area Council (#546) and recognized its existence back to 1910. In 1922, Pawtucket Council was reorganized into Pawtucket & Central Falls Council (#548). In 1924, Newport Council became Newport County Council (#547). In 1926, the Greater Providence Area Council was created from the merger of Greater Providence Council and Newport County Council. In the years 1929 and 1930, the three Rhode Island councils merged into Narragansett Council. The present Narragansett Council was formed as the result of a 2001 merger between the Moby Dick Council and the Narragansett Council.

=== Narragansett Council ===
Narragansett Council is based in East Providence, Rhode Island, but has 3 service areas that serve communities in Massachusetts, Rhode Island and Connecticut:

- Southeast Service Area- New Bedford, Fairhaven, Dartmouth, Marion, Mattapoisett, Rochester, Acushnet, Wareham, Fall River, Assonet, Freetown, Somerset, Westport, Swansea, Seekonk, Rehoboth, Portsmouth, Middletown, Newport, Tiverton, Little Compton, East Providence, Bristol, Warren, Barrington
- Southwest Service Area- Coventry, West Warwick, East Greenwich, West Greenwich, Exeter, Frenchtown, Warwick, Block Island, Narragansett, Wakefield, Westerly, Misquamicut, Bradford, Ashaway, Matunuck, Pawcatuck, Charlestown, Richmond, Hopkinton, Hope Valley, Peacedale, South Kingstown, Kingston, West Kingston, Davisville, North Kingstown, Quidnessett, Wickford, Jamestown
- Northwest Service Area- Burrillville, Scituate, Foster, Glocester, Johnston, Smithfield, North Providence, Providence, Cranston, Woonsocket, Blackstone, Bellingham, North Smithfield, Millville, Uxbridge, Cumberland, Lincoln, Central Falls, Pawtucket
- Northeast Service Area- North Attleboro, Attleboro, South Attleboro, Chartley, Norton, Mansfield, Dighton, Berkley, Taunton, East Taunton, Raynham, Middleboro, Carver, Lakeville

==== Massasoit Council ====
The Fall River Council rechartered as the Massasoit Council. It was headquartered in Fall River, Massachusetts and served that city and the surrounding communities of Somerset, Swansea, Westport, Tiverton and Little Compton. The Wampanoag District served Somerset and Swansea. The Council Office was located in the Women's Union Building on Rock Street. The Massasoit Council existed until 1972.

The primary source for Boy Scout uniforms and gear was McWhirr's department store on South Main Street in Fall River. Many Council-wide Scouting events were often held at Lincoln Park in Westport, Massachusetts. The Firestone Rubber Company, which had a large factory in Fall River, sponsored the Firestone Award for outstanding Boy Scouts in the Massasoit Council in the 1950s and 1960s. These recognition events were held at White's in Westport.

Camping for the Fall River Council began in 1917 at Camp Stanford in Fall River and provided an outlet for boys for four years. It was decided in 1921 at a Fall River Council Executive Board meeting that the purchase of a 100-acre (0.4 km^{2}) wooded area would take place, naming it Camp Noquochoke. Additional land was purchased in Camp Noquochoke's later years covering over 110 acres (0.4 km^{2}) on the eastern shore of the Westport River in Westport. Camp site facilities ranged from undeveloped, to tent sites with platforms, to A-frames ("Adirondacks") to cabins with stoves and bunk beds.

The physical facilities were significantly improved in the late 1950s with a new dining hall (constructed by Fall River (Building) Trades Council with site work provided by the Navy SeabeesReservists) and an in-ground pool. The Navy Seabee Reservists did upgrade the camp road from the entrance on Pine Hill Road to its termination by the former or old dining hall ending at the river's bluff. The Seabees also did the site work for the new dining hall, dugout the archery range and may have partially or completely built the rifle range on the newly acquired Donovan property. This work done by the Seabees was part of their community service, especially non-profit agencies.

Camp legend, the basis for many campfire stories, was a character named "Three-fingered Willie." Camp Noquochoke continued to serve area youth until 1980.

==== Cachalot Council ====
On May 13, 1935, as part of complying with new rules of incorporation for Boy Scout councils in Massachusetts, the New Bedford Council changed its name to the Cachalot Council. The name, derived from the French and Portuguese words for sperm whale, was proposed by Joe Allen, of the [Martha's] Vineyard Gazette, in January 1933 to honor the history of whaling in New Bedford.

At the time, the Council did own a property that was used as a camp. This property, off Rock O' Dundee Road in South Dartmouth [2], was too small and lacked adequate water sources, both for drinking and swimming. For a short time, from 1937 through 1942, the council shared the summer camp facilities of the Fall River Council [3], but this was deemed "not satisfactory for many reasons." [4] From 1943 through 1945, summer camp was held at Camp Maxim, which was owned by the local Boys Club, and also failed to meet the needs of the program.

In 1945, the Cachalot Council conducted a capital fundraising campaign expressly for the purpose of acquiring a suitable camp. Many local businesses and individuals contributed, and the campaign successfully raised $75,000. At the same time, the council began looking for a suitable property. After considering several properties [5], they placed on offer on a large parcel adjacent to the southeastern corner of Myles Standish State Forest, owned by "The Five Mile Corporation." This corporation, headed by Theodore Steinway (of Steinway & Sons Piano), Albert Hathaway, and Russell Davis, had purchased the property during the Great Depression for a mere $12,000, and agreed to sell it to the council for the same price. The deed was signed over in January 1946, and preparations immediately commenced to open the Camp for its first summer camp season ever, with Roland Deneault as Camp Director, in summer of the same year. It has operated continuously since. Cachalot Scout Reservation remains to this day serving scouts in Southeast Massachusetts. Cachalot Council's Order of the Arrow lodge was Agawam Lodge 509 which had the totem of the whale.

==== Moby Dick Council ====
The Moby Dick Council (also known as Moby Dick Council of Massachusetts and Rhode Island) was formed in 1972 by a merger of the Cachalot Council of Greater New Bedford and the Massasoit Council of Greater Fall River. The two former councils were small, and fell victim to the BSA's desire to create larger councils. In 2001, Moby Dick Council suffered a similar fate, and merged with the Narragansett Council of Rhode Island, much to the chagrin of many old-timers of both the smaller councils and the larger Moby Dick Council. Camps Moby Dick Council originally had two camps: Camp Cachalot was the camp for Cachalot Council, and Camp Noquochoke was the camp for Massasoit Council. Camp Noquochoke was sold due to its smaller size and fewer prospects, and later became a residential neighborhood. Camp Cachalot still remains as a weekend and summer resident camp owned and operated by the Narragansett Council.

Massasoit Council's Noquochoke Lodge 124 of the Order of the Arrow merged with Cachalot Council's Agawam Lodge 509 to form Neemat Lodge 124.

==== Annawon Council 1930-2015 ====
The Annawon Council is a local council of the Boy Scouts of America headquartered in Norton, Massachusetts. It is one of the few small councils that remained in the area.

In 1930 Annawon Council was organized, but it was not until January 9, 1931, that it was incorporated under the laws of Massachusetts, and legally established as of April 20, 1933. At the time of organization, the Council included the communities of Attleboro, Mansfield, Norton, Taunton, Raynham, and Berkley. William Lee Abbott was appointed Scout Executive and secretary. Dr. Joseph L. Murphy of Taunton was the first Council president, Annawon was one of the last Councils in Massachusetts to be organized. In 1916 the first Scouting charters in Massachusetts were granted to the Fall River and the Fairhaven-New Bedford Councils. Annawon Council was incorporated in 1931. The state of Massachusetts required that both Fall River and Fairhaven-New Bedford council recharter under the articles of incorporation, at that time Fall River Council became known as the Massasoit Council and Fairhaven-New Bedford Council became known as the Cachalot Council.

During 1932 first serious consideration was given a Council-owned camp site for Annawon Scouts. Although considerable thought was given to a site on Lake Mashpee on Cape Cod, the Council reneged on a thirty-day option to buy the property. During the summer of 1932 the invitation of Old Colony Council to camp with them at Camp Childs on Morey's Pond was accepted. on October 1, 1932, as a result of the permission of Mr. Clement Jeffers of Attleboro, a camp site for weekend camping was dedicated as Camp Jeffers. During the summer of 1933, the scouts camped on Greenwood Lake, West Mansfield, at Camp Annawon. This was the first year that a camp existed, the site was known as Camp Finberg, it was a YMCA camp. After considerable study in 1934, the Council purchased 25 Acres on Darby Pond in Plymouth for use as a camp site. The site was known as "Camp King" and was purchased from Phillip Cole for $2,500.00. From July 15 to August 19, scouts camped on the shore of Darby Pond at Camp Annawon. The original entrance road was off of Plymouth street just off of Carver St (Route 44). It crossed over the cranberry dam below the present BB Range. On June 24, 1935, William A. Collins of Norwich, Connecticut and a graduate of MIT was appointed Scout Executive. He immediately went into camp to direct the Council Camp, which was officially named Camp Norse for the first time. That year the boy week count rose to 165.

In 1940 the land north of the original property of 25 acres was purchased for $300.00, it included an abandoned house in a large field. This field became the ball field. A new entrance road into camp was built off of Partings way road. It was later enlarged by the National Guard Army Corps of Engineers. In 1950 Ellis Brewster from the Plymouth Cordage Company donated 100 acres to Annawon council to increase the size of Camp Norse. That same year, the shallow well was replaced with a deeper well and then was enclosed in a block house through a grant from the George Magee Memorial Fund. In 1960 the camp received a bronze bell, dated 1891. Howard Fowler, Editor of The Mansfield News and former Council President, was instrumental in procuring the bell from the Mansfield Fire Department. It came from an old firehouse on West Church St In Mansfield.

Camp Norse is the sole camp of the council located at 112 Parting Ways Rd. Kingston, Massachusetts. In 2014, it was announced that Annawon Council will be merging with a neighboring council. In the spring of 2015, Annawon Council's executive committee announced it will be starting merger talks with Narragansett Council headquartered in East Providence, Rhode Island. The council formally merged in September 2015. The council was divided into the following districts serving 11 communities in Bristol and Plymouth Counties:

- Angle Tree District: North Attleboro, Attleboro, Norton, Mansfield
- Sachem District: Dighton, Berkley, Taunton, Raynham, Middleboro, Carver, Lakeville

In June 1941, Tulpe Lodge, Order of the Arrow was approved by the executive board. On August 2, 1943, the council applied for and received a charter for their new Order of the Arrow Lodge, and Tulpe Lodge was official. The turtle shell symbol came from the turtles from Camp Norse. Apparently it was custom at the time to hollow out a turtle shell and use it as a neckerchief slide. There is no chapter system in use for the two districts of the lodge/council. Tulpe has hosted three conclaves at Camp Norse for Area 1C, and Section NE-1B. The name Tulpe remained in the Narragansett Council Merger.

==== South East Camping Association ====
In 1993 Camp Norse officially became Camp Norse Cub World and was no longer used for the summer camp for the Scout Troops but rather was used by Cub Scouts through the South East Camping Association (SEMCA). This was a North East Region BSA sanctioned program that included the Cape Cod and Islands Council, Annawon Council, and the Moby Dick Council. This effort was designed to use the resources available in these three councils. Troop camping for all three Councils was to be at Camp Cachalot which was owned by the Moby Dick Council. The Cub Scout summer camp would be at Camp Norse, and the Boy Scout High Adventure summer camp, would be at Camp Greenough on Cape Cod.

==== The Original Narragansett Council 1917-2001 ====
The Narragansett Council, Boy Scouts of America is part of a worldwide Scouting movement with over 15 million members in one hundred countries. Boy Scouting began in England in 1907 when the British military hero, Lord Robert Baden-Powell, organized the first Boy Scout camp. In 1908, he published Scouting for Boys and formed what would become the British Boy Scout Association.

As a result of a “good turn” performed by an English Scout in London for Chicago publisher William D. Boyce, Scouting came to America. The Boy Scouts of America was incorporated in 1910 and chartered by Congress on June 15, 1916.

Scouting in Rhode Island began as the Rhode Island Boy Scouts which was first organized as a voluntary association on September 6, 1910. On April 13, 1911, it was chartered under state laws for the purpose of giving boys of Rhode Island an organization in which they could be formed into groups that mirrored the newly formed national Boy Scout Program. From 1910 to 1917, Rhode Island Boy Scouts established groups (troops) throughout Rhode Island, except in Newport, Blackstone Valley and Woonsocket. In these locations, troops were organized and affiliated with the National Council Boy Scouts of America.

In 1917, Rhode Island Boy Scouts ‘merged’ with the National movement. Under the terms of the agreement, the Greater Providence Council Boy Scouts of America was formed to take over the operation of the Scouting Program and supervision of troops. The National Council Boy Scouts of America recognized the date of the council's organization as September 6, 1910, and granted all members back service to that date. The National Council Boy Scouts of America also agreed that the Rhode Island Boy Scouts could maintain its corporate identity so that it could continue to receive bequests, hold funds and properties and acquire other funds and properties in the future; thus, the formation of Rhode Island Boy Scouts as a Trustee organization.

In 1929 and 1930, the Greater Providence Council Boy Scouts of America merged with the Newport County Council, the Pawtucket-Central Falls Council and the Woonsocket Council to form the Narragansett Council.

The Order of the Arrow Lodge was the Wincheck Lodge 534 which had the totem of the bear and specifically served Yawgoog Scout Reservation. It was formed in the 1950s from Yawgoog's honor society, The Wincheck Indians, when the Order of the Arrow became growing in national popularity.

==== Narragansett Council 2002-2015 ====
On July 1, 2001, the Moby Dick Council headquartered in New Bedford, Massachusetts, merged with the Narragansett Council in Providence, Rhode Island, adding 17 more cities and towns in Massachusetts to the six cities and towns the Narragansett Council was already serving. The Council serves almost 26,000 registered youth members and Learning for Life participants and supports in excess of 5,000 registered adult volunteers. The Narragansett Council operates two Scout Shops/Service Centers (one in the Summit Square Plaza on Route 2 in Warwick, Rhode Island and one in the Swansea Mall in Swansea, Massachusetts) and owned and operated eight great camps: Camp Aquapaug in South Kingstown, Rhode Island, Buck Hill Scout Reservation in Burrillville, Rhode Island, Camp Buxton in Rehoboth, Massachusetts, Cub World at Buck Hill Scout Reservation in Burrillville, Rhode Island, Cachalot Scout Reservation in Carver, MassachusettsA, Champlin Scout Reservation in Cranston, Rhode Island, Sandsland on Block Island, and Yawgoog Scout Reservation in Hopkinton, Rhode Island. Administrative functions are housed at 10 Risho Avenue in East Providence, Rhode Island.

The Order of the Arrow Lodge is Abnaki Lodge 102 with the totem of a bear and a peace pipe.

Narragansett Council began merger talks with Annawon Council based in Norton, Massachusetts in 2015 and officially merged on September 10, 2015, under the name Narragansett Council.

==== The Modern Narragansett Council ====
On September 10, 2015, the Annawon Council headquartered in Norton, Massachusetts, merged with the Narragansett Council in East Providence, Rhode Island, adding 11 more cities and towns in Massachusetts to the 23 cities and towns the Narragansett Council was already serving. The newly merged operation, which will take the name of the Narragansett Council, includes all of Rhode Island, 34 communities in Massachusetts and one in Connecticut, and boasts nearly 14,000 Scouts, the largest in Northeast Area 1. The Narragansett Council’s main headquarters remain at its current location in East Providence. The Narragansett Council operates a Scout Shop in the Summit Square Plaza on Route 2 in Warwick, Rhode Island. The Council owns and operates nine camps: Camp Norse in Kingston, Massachusetts, Camp Aquapaug in South Kingstown, Rhode Island, Buck Hill Scout Reservation in Burrillville, Rhode Island, Cub World at Buck Hill Scout Reservation in Burrillville, Rhode Island, Camp Buxton in Rehoboth, Massachusetts, Cachalot Scout Reservation in Carver, Massachusetts, Champlin Scout Reservation in Cranston, Rhode Island, Sandsland on Block Island, and Yawgoog Scout Reservation in Hopkinton, Rhode Island. Administrative functions are housed at 10 Risho Avenue in East Providence, Rhode Island.

The Order of the Arrow lodge of the council is Tulpe Lodge 102 with the totem of the turtle, formed from a merger of Narragansett Council's Abnaki Lodge 102 and Annawon Council's Tulpe Lodge 245.

== Scouting in Rhode Island today ==
Narragansett Council
- Owner: Boy Scouts of America
- Headquarters: East Providence
- Location: Rhode Island, Massachusetts
- Country: United States
- Founded: 1916
- Scout Executive: Tim McCandless
- Website narragansettbsa.org

The Narragansett Council of the Boy Scouts of America serves all of the state of Rhode Island and some of Massachusetts and Connecticut. Its several camps include Camp Yawgoog, Champlin Scout Reservation, and Camp Norse.

== Girl Scouting in Rhode Island ==
Girl Scouting in Rhode Island
- Map of Girl Scout Council in Rhode Island
- Owner: Girl Scouts of the USA
- Headquarters: New York, New York
- Country: United States

The first Girl Scout troop in Rhode Island was started in 1914 and the first council in 1919. In 1962 the then existing 9 Rhode Island councils merged to form Girl Scouts of Rhode Island.

=== Girl Scouts of Southeastern New England ===
Girl Scouts of Southeastern New England, headquartered in Warwick, Rhode Island is the council serving Rhode Island. It also includes 13 communities in Massachusetts (see Scouting in Massachusetts for map) and Pawcatuck, Connecticut. In 2014, Girl Scouts of Rhode Island underwent a name change to become Girl Scouts of Southeastern New England (GSSNE) in an effort to gully encompass the expanded service demographic which includes all of Rhode Island, thirteen Massachusetts towns, and Pawcatuck, CT.

==== Camps ====
- Camp Cookie is in Glocester, Rhode Island.
- Camp Hoffman is 75 acres (300,000 m^{2}) in West Kingston, Rhode Island on the shores of Larkin Pond. It was established in 1921.
- Camp Narrow River is in North Kingstown, Rhode Island (sold in 2015)
- Camp Nokewa is in North Kingstown, Rhode Island (sold in 2010)
- Camp Promising Acres is in Swansea, Massachusetts
- Camp Rocky Farm is 5 acres (20,000 m^{2}) in Newport, Rhode Island

The Girl Scouts of Southeastern New England have a museum at Camp Hoffman, and their headquarters is in Warwick, Rhode Island.

== See also ==
- Roy Williams (Scouting)
- Camp Yawgoog
