= Amos Thomas =

Amos Thomas may refer to:

- Amos Thomas (Nebraska politician) (1882–1962), American politician and brigadier general from Nebraska
- Amos Thomas (Wisconsin politician) (1826–?), American politician from Wisconsin
- Amos Thomas (basketball) (1949–2005), American basketball player
