= Senator Vogel =

Senator Vogel may refer to:

- Carl M. Vogel (1955–2016), Missouri State Senate
- Elder Vogel (born 1956), Pennsylvania State Senate
- Jill Vogel (born 1970), Virginia State Senate
- Karl Vogel (1884–1959), Nebraska State Senate
