= Newport Council =

Newport Council may apply to

- Newport City Council, the city of Newport, Wales
- Newport Council of the Boy Scouts
