= Yawgoog Scout Reservation =

Scout camp in Rhode Island

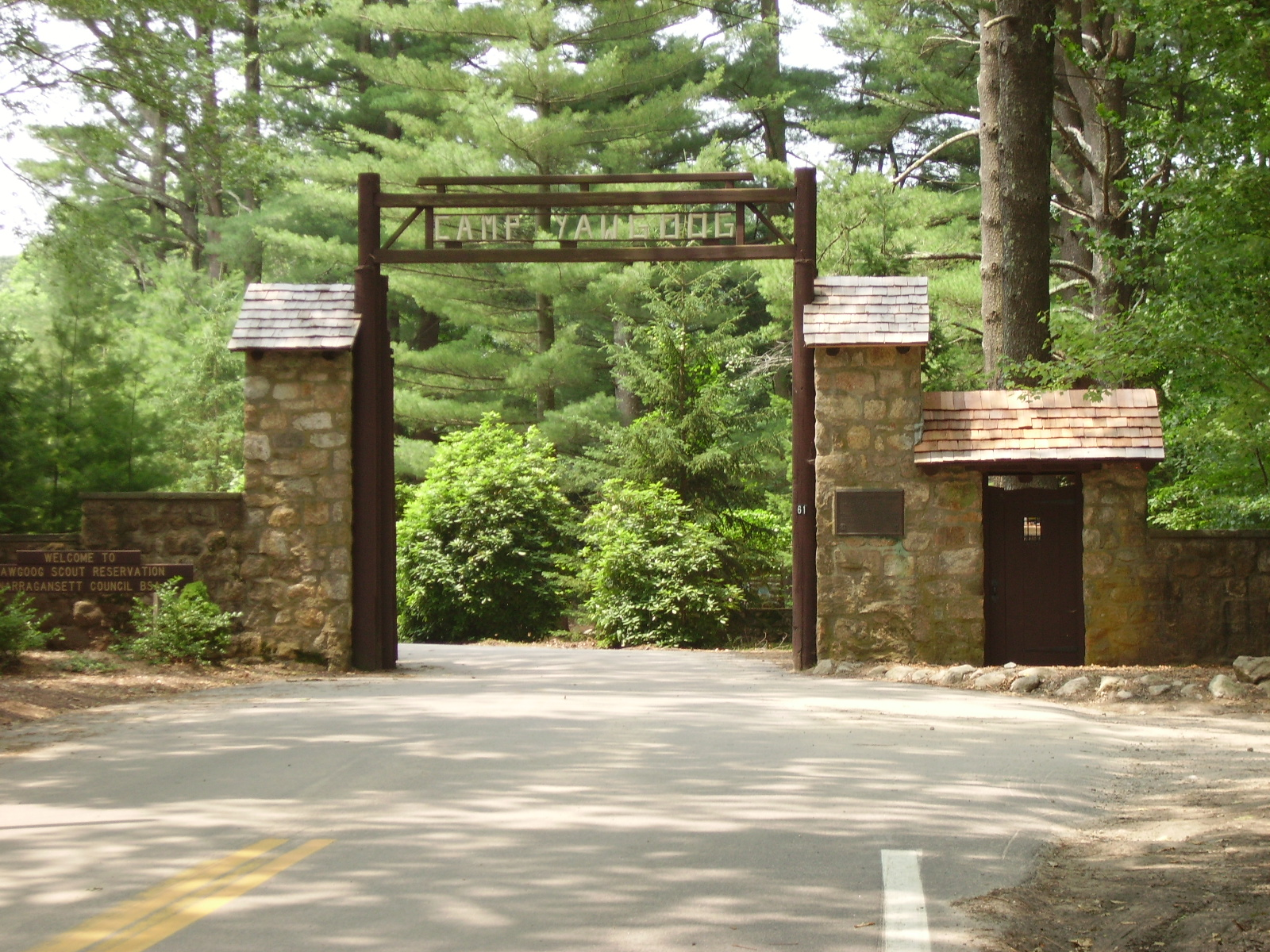
- The main entrance to Camp Yawgoog
- Owner: Rhode Island Boy Scouts
- Location: 61 Camp Yawgoog Rd. Rockville, Rhode Island 02873
- Country: United States
- Coordinates: 41°31′15″N 71°46′37″W
- Founded: 1916
- Founder: Donald North
- Reservation Director: Jonathan DiLuglio
- Website; Official website

Yawgoog Scout Reservation (Camp Yawgoog) (pronounced YAH-goo) is a 1,800-acre (728 ha) reservation for scouting located in Rockville, Rhode Island and operated by the Narragansett Council of Scouting America. Founded in 1916, Yawgoog is the fifth oldest Boy Scout camp in the United States. At the camp an seven-week program is run every summer where Scouts stay for a week with their troops. The reservation is divided into three camps: Three Point, Medicine Bow, and Sandy Beach.

== History ==
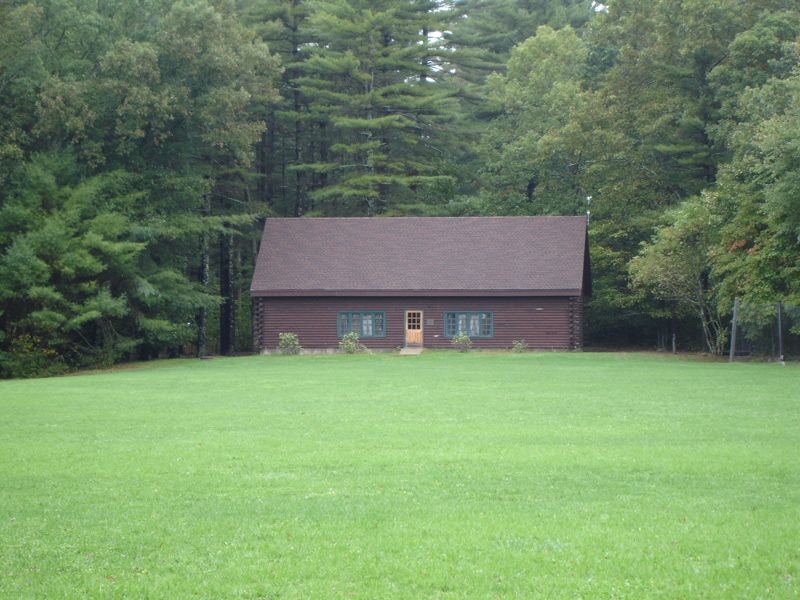
The Arthur Livingston Kelley Environmental Education Center

In 1916, after inspecting some twenty ponds in Rhode Island, Scout Executive Donald North recommended the deserted Joseph Palmer farm property on Yawgoog Pond as a permanent reservation for Scouting. The 150-acre (0.6 km^{2}) piece was leased to Rhode Island Boy Scouts (RIBS) in 1916 and purchased in 1917. According to local mythology, Yawgoog and Wincheck were the names of two Narragansett Native American chiefs. However, there is no historical record of any such chiefs or sachems with either of these names. The water rights to the pond, all of their equipment, fourteen mill houses, a store, and approximately 200-acre (1 km^{2}) of unimproved land were obtained in 1953 when the Rhode Island Boy Scouts purchased a controlling interest in the Yawgo Line and Twine Company. The reservation continues to be separately owned by RIBS though the camp is run by the Narragansett Council of the Boy Scouts of America. In 1917 the RIBS, and BSA merged to form the Greater Providence Council, making the RIBS a trustee organization just five years after its conception. Chief Yawgoog serves as the mascot for the camp. He is usually portrayed in a cartoon, shirtless, wearing leather Native American trousers and moccasins, smoking a calumet, holding a canoe over himself and appears as if he is about to set off canoeing.

The reservation is also associated with creating the first Totin' Chip axe-safety program. John Page, nicknamed "Johnny Appleseed," created the program in 1950.

The Apprentice in Training (AIT) program was started in 1956 in an effort to better train incoming staff members. The AIT corps, the first of its kind, was later renamed the Counselor-in-Training (CIT) corps and set the standard for subsequent programs across the country. In 2018, the CIT program was revised and renamed the Yawgoog Leadership Experience.

The reservation is divided into three distinct camps. Each camp operates independently and has a dining hall, waterfront, and trading post. Yawgoog campers used to set up tents as part of one centralized camp on what is now Tim O'Neil Field, which is located in Camp Three Point. In 1924, Yawgoog was divided between Upper Camp and Lower Camp, and three camps eventually emerged.

Yawgoog is normally active during the summer for eight weeks of operation. During the off season tent camping is allowed at various campgrounds and cabin camping is allowed in any of the four cabins available. These spaces are available for troops who wish perform outdoor events when summer camp is not in session.

In 1965, the architect responsible for the building work was D. Thomas Russillo.

On May 13, 2020, the Reservation announced that it would not be opening for the 2020 summer camp season due to the COVID-19 pandemic. This was the first season the Reservation has not opened in 104 seasons.

== Landscape ==
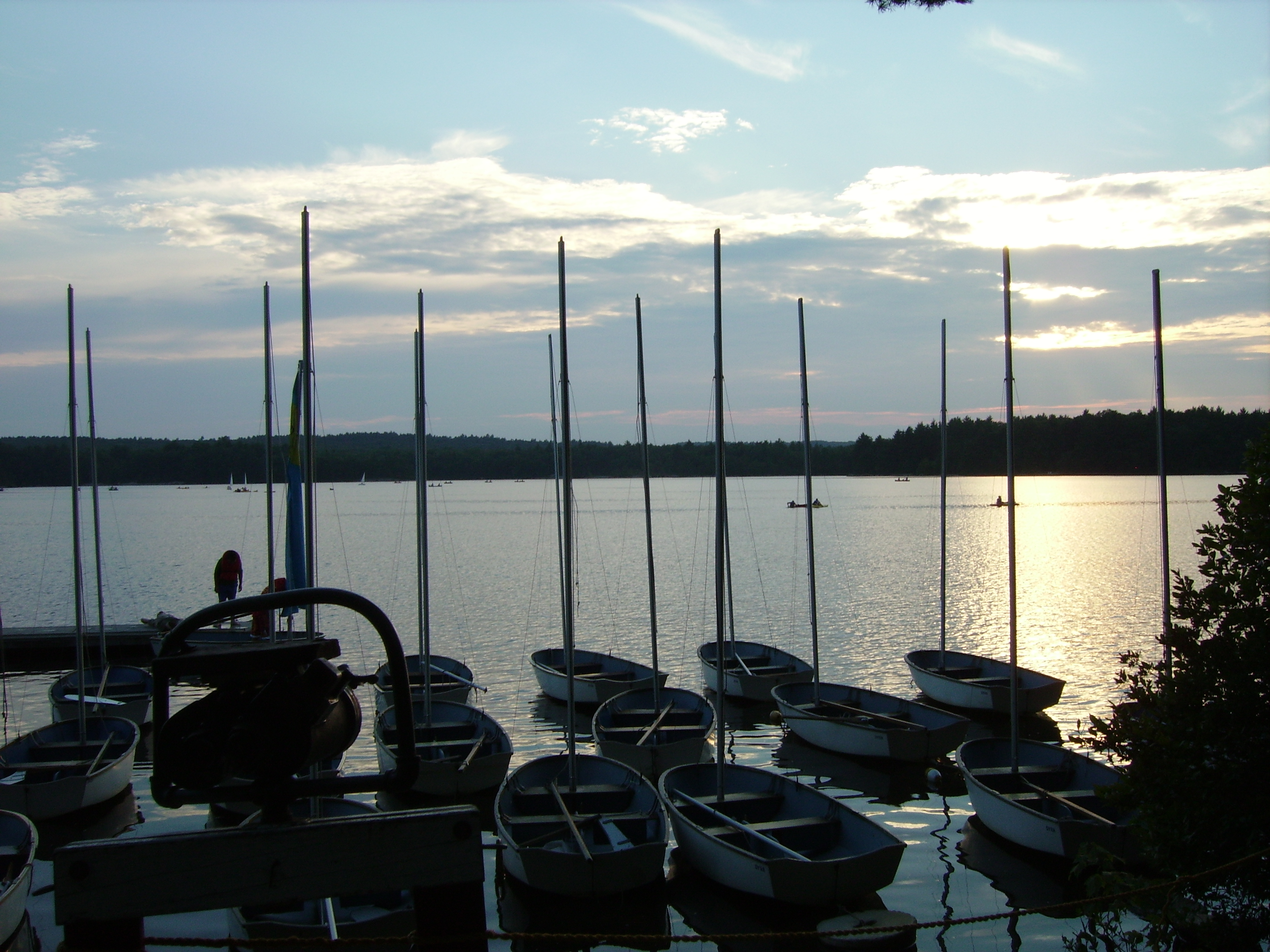
The Ashaway Aquatics Center

Yawgoog is located in the southwestern corner of Rhode Island—the closest town Hopkinton, RI, which sits at 41.44N -71.79W. The terrain of the reservation is fairly flat, with only one hill (Hill 407), located in the southwestern corner of the reservation. Most of the reservation is forested and consists of deciduous and evergreen trees. On May 4–6, 1930, the camp suffered a forest fire. Much of the forest was destroyed and subsequently replaced with white pines due to their ability to grow quickly. Remnants of the fire are unnoticeable today. There are six main trails that are marked throughout the reservation, and named by colored chevrons (Red, Orange, Yellow, Green, Blue, White) which mark each trail. Trails run through the camps, as well as out through the wilderness to various sights and ponds of the reservation.

The reservation includes three ponds—the main pond is Yawgoog Pond, which serves as the nexus for the three camps for most water and boating activities. To the south, and connected to Yawgoog Pond via a dam and "long cove" is Wincheck Pond. And, to the north of Yawgoog Pond is Hidden Lake (accessible by hiking the "Hidden Lake Trail"), found after the forest fire. Hidden Lake was acidified to the point that there is no longer any fish or plants living in it after all of the debris created by the forest fire that exposed it was bulldozed into the lake. There is also a trail to nearby Long Pond further south (and downstream from Wincheck). There are several islands on Yawgoog Pond, including Cranberry and Submarine islands in the north corner of the pond, Ant and Schooner Islands which are adjacent to the largest island, named King Phillips Island. King Phillips Island has periodically hosted "adventure camps" over the years but has been largely disused over the past 20 years.

The reservation covers roughly 1,800 acres of land which partly extends into Connecticut.

== Organization and traditions ==
Each camp is usually run by a camp director, assistant camp director, and two program commissioners, with three for Camp Sandy Beach (aside from 2021 due to outstanding circumstances), all of which answer to the Reservation Director (currently Jonathan DiLuglio). As there are three distinct camps, each has its own songs, cheers, history, and traditions. Each campsite within a camp has a short motto. With the exception of each camp's waterfront and dining lodge, all program centers are available to campers from all three camps.

At the end of each week of camp, all of the troops from all of the camps form ranks and do a ceremony called the Camp Yawgoog Dress Parade.

=== Camp Three Point ===
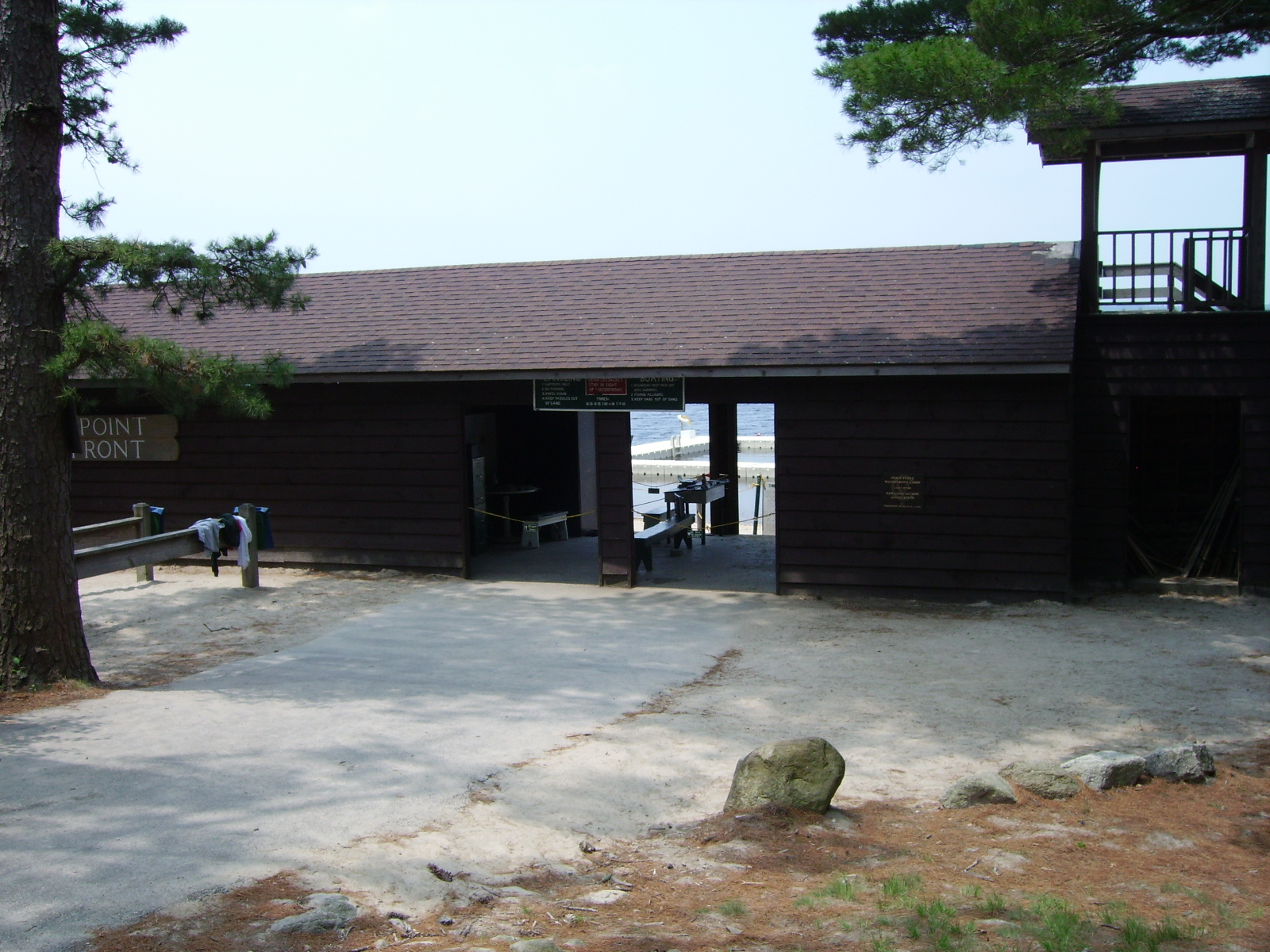
Camp Three Point Water Front

Camp Three Point, named for the three points of the Scout Oath, was the first of the three camps to be founded. First named Camp Bucklin, it has been deemed "The oldest and most tradition-filled camp" and also "The Camp that was once Yawgoog in its entirety." Today, Camp Three Point features the Challenge Course, the Bucklin Building, the Eagle Badge program, the Arthur Livingston Kelly Environmental Education Center, The Three Point Waterfront, the first New Frontier Center on reservation (no longer open), and the 407 Outfitters, the reservation's largest trading post. Camp Three Point also hosts the Protestant Chapel and the Jewish Synagogue. It is home to the reservation's first basketball court and includes a dam which has become a popular fishing site for scouts. It is also home to the Memorial Bell Tower, which tolls at noon each day in honor of those Scouts who died serving their country. Camp Three Point's camp colors are orange and yellow. Its mascots are Danny the Deer, a mounted deer head who resides in Sharpe Lodge. And also Henry the Dragon, one of the first mascots created by camp but dissolved after years of forgetting about him. Henry is a green dragon who can shoot orange flames out of his mouth, he loves to tell the scouts a song or two once and awhile. The Sharpe Lodge was built in 1924 to serve as the original Bucklin Building. The Sharpe Lodge was fully refurbished in the late 1980s. After the 2019 season, the original Sharpe Lodge was demolished and replaced with a wholly new building, including an improved kitchen, a larger dining hall, and staff space.

The fifteen Campsites at Camp Three Point are named after famous figures in Yawgoog history or old Scouting nicknames: Donald C. Dewing (Scoutmaster of Troop 82 Providence for over 50 years), Edward Banister, Forty-Niner, Frontier, Musketeer, Oak Ridge, Pioneer, Santa Fe, Sleepy Hollow, Tuocs (Scout spelled backwards), Wells Fargo, Slade, Street, Scott and Zucculo.

=== Camp Medicine Bow ===
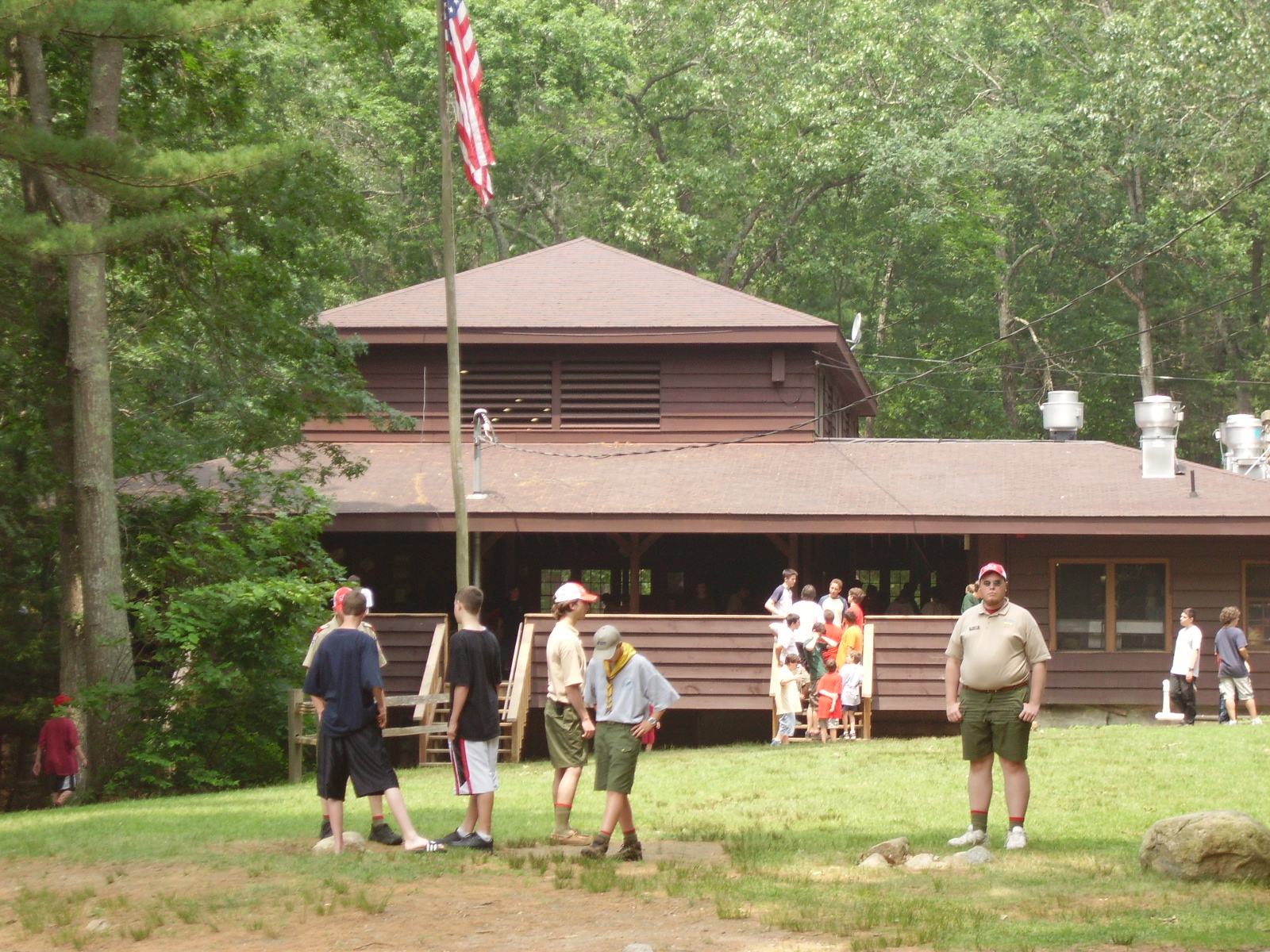
Camp Medicine Bow Dining Hall

After the founding of Camp Three Point, the popularity of the reservation grew to the point where a second camp was needed. Built around Rathom Lodge in the 1920s, Medicine Bow encompasses the center section of Yawgoog's developed land. It houses the only three provisional sites on the reservation: the Counselor-in-Training Corps (CIT), the Baden Powell provisional camp, and the Webelos' provisional Camp (moved from Feinstein Youth Camp in Pascoag, Rhode Island in 2007). In addition to provisional sites, Camp Medicine Bow offers many program centers. These include the H. Cushman Anthony Stockade (Crafts Center), the Medicine Bow Waterfront, the Ashaway Aquatics Center (Yawgoog Yacht Club), and The Robotics Center. It also hosts the Armington Memorial Health Lodge, and the Saint John Bosco Catholic Chapel. It is also home to the reservation's motorboat, "The Charlie Brown", which patrols the pond for capsized boats. Medicine Bow's colors are red and black, and its mascot is Elmo the Elk, who presides over Rathom Lodge during meals. Camp Medicine Bow's nickname is "The Heart of Yawgoog","the best camp in Yawgoog", “the cream between the two Oreo cookies”, or “The camp that is always awake, but never stops dreaming.”

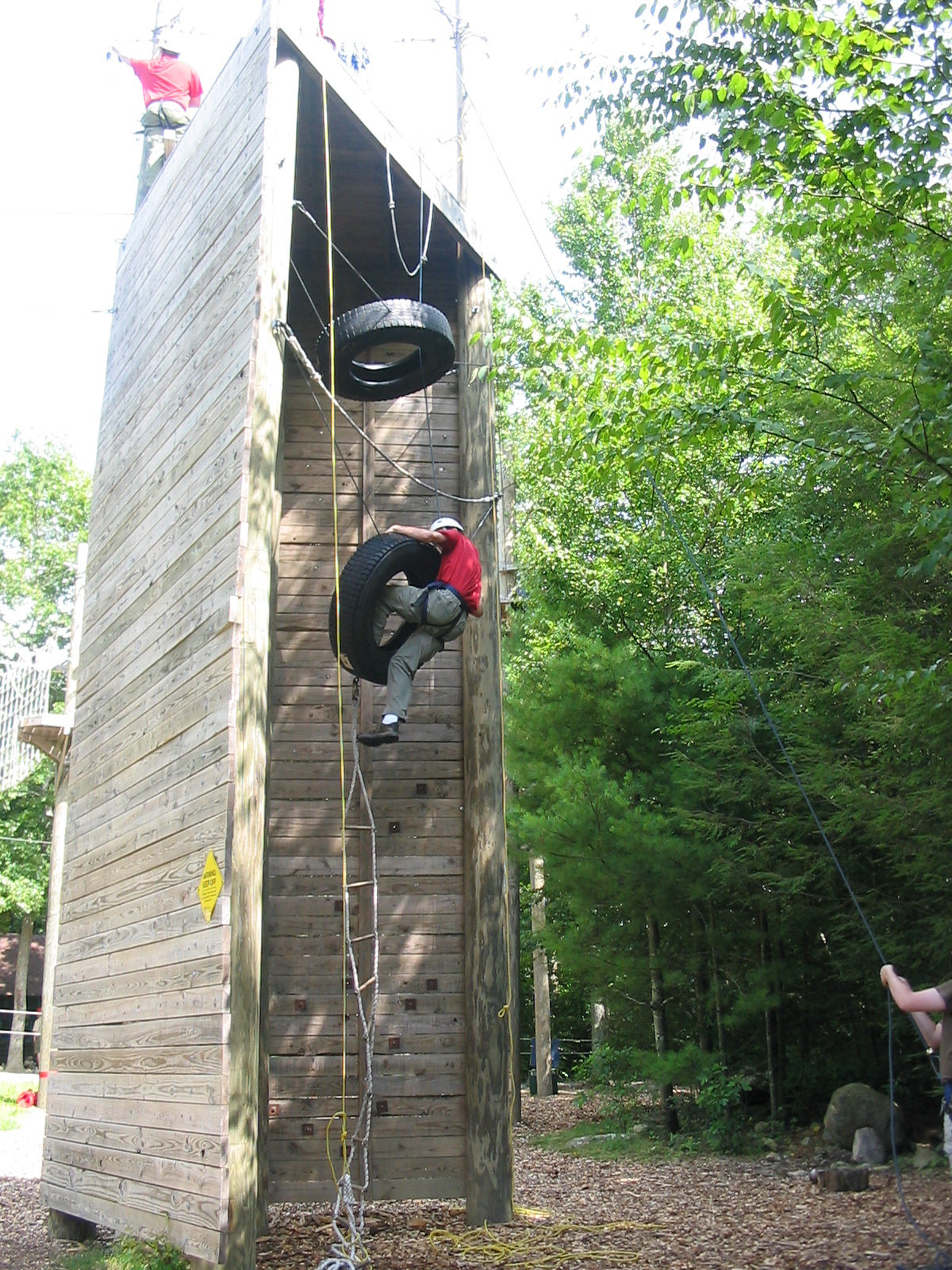
Adventure 2 Rope Course

The fifteen campsites of Camp Medicine Bow are named after Native American terms with two exceptions: Baden-Powell Provisional Camp and Campsite Dan Boone. The other camps include Cautantowit, Manchose, Manitoo, Minnikesu (Yawgoog Leadership Experience), Netop, Neimpaug, Red Wing, Sequan (Medicine Bow Webelos), Waskecke, Weemat, Wetoumuck, Wunegin, and Wuttah.

=== Camp Sandy Beach ===
Located farthest from the reservation's main entrance, and somewhat to the north of Medicine Bow, lies Camp Sandy Beach. It was built in the late-1920s around Jesse H. Metcalf Lodge. Today, Sandy Beach calls itself the "youngest and most spirited camp" as well as "The Powerhouse of Yawgoog." It is also the largest of the three camps within the Yawgoog Reservation. Sandy Beach maintains the Lane-Bliven Rifle Range, the David Anderson Archery Range, the Trap Range, the Sandy Beach Waterfront which includes the current Adventure Island, the current New Frontiers Program, the Scoutmaster Essentials Program, and the Campcraft or Outdoor Skills center where Scouts learn the traditional skills associated with Scouting like Wilderness Survival, Orienteering or Camping. Sandy Beach's colors are blue and yellow, and their main mascot is Jim the Moose, though they have several other mascots including two bananas, a rock, and a "crazy" crocodile. The camp also once housed the Reservation Baker up until 2019, when the position was moved to Camp Three Point. In 2022 the position was once again returned to the Sandy Beach Bakery.

Camp Sandy Beach's eighteen campsites are named after famous Americans in history and include the following: Abe Lincoln, Audubon, Backwoods, Davy Crockett, Donald H. Cady, George Washington, Jim Bridger, Paul Siple, James West, John Glenn, Frederick Douglass, Lewis and Clark, Neil Armstrong, Norman Rockwell, Richard Byrd, Silver Buffalo, Teddy Roosevelt, Ida Lewis, and Earnest Seaton.

One campsite used to be named Camp Baden-Powell, after Boy Scouts founder Robert Baden-Powell. It comprised a circle of tents around a field with a flagpole at its center. The former Baden-Powell site now houses the current Neil Armstrong campsite.

Prior to the 2021 camping season, Campsite Ida Lewis was added and Campsites Jim Bowie and Kit Carson were renamed respectively to Paul Siple and Frederick Douglass.

Three other, now defunct campsites, exist in Sandy Beach as well, those being Paul Siple (distinct from the former Jim Bowie site), Bill Cody, and Ernest Thompson Seton.

== Awards ==
There are many awards offered at Yawgoog Scout Reservation that can be earned by Scouts, Scouters, Troops and Patrols. In addition to the many merit badges offered by the various program centers to Scouts, Scouters can take advantage of a variety of programs to further their knowledge, and Patrols and Troops can earn various honors and ribbons by participation in specific development programs. Of note, are the NRA and National Archery Association awards, along with BSA Mile Swim, Lifeguard BSA, Snorkeling BSA, Sailing and Canoe regattas. Among the reservation-wide awards include the Fishing Derby, where each week the winner takes home a fishing pole. Within each camp, the Troop of the Week and Camp Champion awards are given out, in addition to honor troop and patrol awards.

A notable award given by Yawgoog Scout Reservation is the Bucklin Marksmanship Medal. Scouts wishing to earn the medal must shoot at 10 consecutive targets, 6 from the prone position, 4 standing, at 50'. The sum of the 10 targets must meet or exceed 400 points. The Scout who scores highest for the summer is awarded a rifle and case by the Camp. In the event of a tie, a shoot-off is arranged during the last week of camp.

=== Segments ===
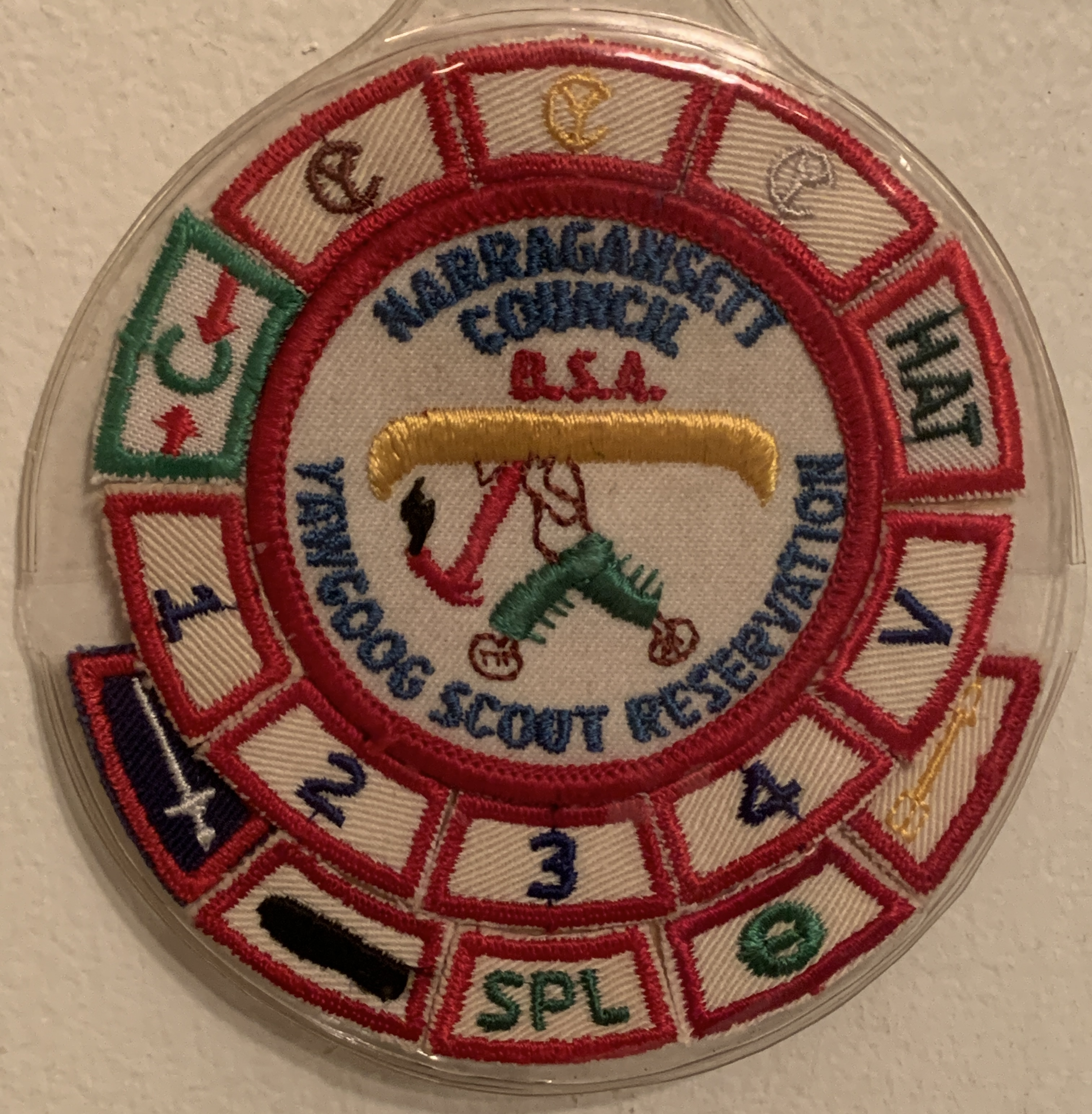
Yawgoog patch and segments from the 1980s

Yawgoog Segments are unique awards to the camp, and have been fairly popular for years. Segments are small, curved patches which go around the circular Yawgoog patch. Some choose to sew the segments and central patch directly on their uniform shirt, while others sew them to a circular piece of material such as felt or leather, or insert them into a plastic holder which can be worn from a pocket button. A felt circle found at the trading post can hold up to four rows of segments. The original ten segments started in 1951 were strips of cloth. The original cloth segments included: the three Camper of Yawgoog levels (CYs), the 1 year through Veteran markers, the Knights of Yawgoog, and the now defunct Wincheck Braves. Since then, many new segments have been added.

==== General Camping Segments ====
Camping within each camp will earn said person a segment, with the camp's two-letter abbreviation stamped on it: "TP" for Three Point, "MB" for Medicine Bow, and "SB" for Sandy Beach. In addition, a segment can be earned for each additional year that a person attends at least one week, marked as "1 Year" through "5 Year", and "V-6" through "V-9". Segments are also given for what state the camper is a resident in. Camping during Jubilee years, occurring every 25 years, are another type of segment that is able to be earned. A special 100-year anniversary segment was handed out to campers who attended in 2016.

==== Activity Segments ====
Shooting sports has the "Yeoman" for archery, "Rifle" for rifle shooting, and "Trap" for shotgun shooting. The Challenge Center has many different segments: "HAT" for the Handicap Awareness Trail, "AI" for team-building games, "AC" for completing low ropes elements, "AII" for climbing on the course, and "AIII" for climbing on the Giant's Ladder. Aquatic activities have segments for the Mile Swim, kayaking, canoeing, and sailing, and the various centers have segments as well, such as "Campcraft", "HCAS", "YHC" for visiting the Yawgoog Heritage Center, and "Barn". Hiking awards consist of "Hiker of Yawgoog" and "GPS" for walking along various trails and completing various requirements.

===== Leadership Segments =====
In each week of program during the summer, all three camps give out a troop award, called the "Troop of the week", for various criteria, including participation in inter-troop events, number of merit badges earned, and campsite cleanliness, among others. Segments are also given out for Leadership positions, and coming to camp as a Senior Patrol Leader, Scoutmaster, Assistant Scoutmaster, CIT, or Staff. As a member of the CIT Corps, a Scout may earn the "Top Basic" award, for those who have excelled as a leader during their Basic week of Counselor Training. This award is determined by a vote among the Scouts who participated in the CIT training program during that week. Members of the CIT Corps are also evaluated after their field weeks, named after the fact that they are working at a center "in the field". The CIT with the top performance during their basic and field week(s) across the entire summer is given the Frederick W. Marvel award. The award includes a certificate, and a gold medal suspended from a red, white, and blue ribbon, and the other 9 participants out of the top 10 are recognized during the Saturday Night Show.

== Controversies ==
Tavis Morello, an Eagle Scout and staff member working at Yawgoog Scout Reservation, was fired in 1999 for admitting he was gay to Scouting official Gary Savignano. The official additionally confiscated Morello's Eagle Scout card. Lyle Antonides, director of the Narragansett Council at the time, defended the action by stating, "I think this young man is just trying to get a headline." In response to the firing, staff members at the reservation staged a sit-in, resulting in the camp being shut down. Following this protest, representatives of GLAD and the Rhode Island affiliate of the ACLU looked into the situation. ACLU executive director Steven Brown said, "Based on the information I've heard, this person was terminated because he acknowledged he was gay. And that's illegal." Due to mounting legal pressures and increasing amounts of negative publicity, by the end of the camping season, the Narragansett Council leaders had reversed the decision and offered to reinstate Morello, both as an employee and as an Eagle Scout.

On February 15, 2019 the Reservation's former Catholic Chaplain James Glawson was arrested and charged with sexually assaulting several children since the 1980s. He also was in possession of child pornography.

== Adult organizations ==
=== Yawgoog Alumni Association ===
In order to continue the sustainability of the camp, the Yawgoog Alumni Association was started by H. Cushman "Gus" Anthony in 1980 to raise money for improvements on the camp. Efforts include opening the Yawgoog Heritage Museum which houses books, uniforms, patches and pictures from throughout the camp's history. The crafts center, the "H. Cushman Anthony Stockade", is named after him in gratitude of his actions.

=== Knights of Yawgoog ===
At the Friday Night Show of each week, selected Scout leaders are announced, and asked to stand on stage, where they are recognized for their first-time dedication as adult leaders. They are thereafter inducted into the Knights of Yawgoog, marked by the ceremonial induction potato, which is necklace of a potato threaded by a rope that is required to be worn of all new recruits and cannot be removed for 24 hours or when the inductee leaves Reservation property to head home, whichever comes first. It was started in 1920 when the "Knights" would be commissioned by a "King of Yawgoog". It was a lighthearted club with no obligations, but later evolved into a more serious group to remind adults of their role in molding Scouts. Scoutmasters inducted into the Knights of Yawgoog earned a patch tab of a gold sword against a navy blue background for uniform wear.

== In popular culture ==
In 2011, filming took place for the 2012 film Moonrise Kingdom at various places in the camp. Shots of the Medicine-Bow waterfront, the Challenge Course, the H. Cushman Anthony Stockade, the Three-Point Dam and the wooden bridge that leads into the Donald Dewing campsite can be seen in various parts of the movie.

== See also ==
- Scouting in Rhode Island
- Camp Cachalot
