= Sidney Cullingham =

American politician (1896–1983)

Member of the Nebraska Legislature from the 9th district
- In office January 5, 1943 – January 7, 1947
- Preceded by: Amos Thomas
- Succeeded by: Karl Vogel

Personal details
- Born: November 8, 1896 Omaha, Nebraska
- Died: July 29, 1983 (aged 86) Buffalo, New York
- Spouse: Charlotte Acer (m. 1923)
- Children: 3
- Relatives: Robert B. Howell (stepfather)
- Education: Lafayette College; University of Chicago (B.S.)
- Occupation: Real estate broker, lawyer

Military service
- Allegiance: United States
- Branch/service: United States Army

Sidney J. Cullingham (November 8, 1896 – July 29, 1983) was an American politician from Nebraska who served as a member of the Nebraska Legislature from the 9th district from 1943 to 1947.

== Early life ==
Cullingham was born in Omaha, Nebraska, in 1896, to Charles Sidney Cullingham and Alice Chase. His father died when he was two years old, and his mother married Robert B. Howell, who later served in the United States Senate. Cullingham attended Lafayette College and the University of Chicago, and served in World War I in the United States Army under the command of John Gilbert Winant. He worked in real estate, and was appointed the Douglas County Chief Deputy Election Commissioner, representing the Republican Party, by governors Charles W. Bryan and Roy Cochran.

== Nebraska Legislature ==
In 1942, State Senator Amos Thomas, who was serving in the U.S. Army during World War II as a brigadier general, declined to seek re-election, and Cullingham ran to succeed him in the 9th district. Cullingham narrowly placed second in a crowded primary, winning 20 percent of the vote to University of Omaha Law School Dean Elmer Thomas's 21 percent. They advanced to the general election, which Cullingham won in a landslide, receiving 65 percent of the vote to Thomas's 35 percent.

Cullingham ran for re-election in 1944, and was challenged by salesman Howard Patterson and attorney Grenville North. Cullingham placed first in the primary election by a wide margin, winning 53 percent of the vote to Patterson's 25 percent and North's 21 percent. In the general election, he defeated Patterson, winning his second term, 56–44 percent.

In 1946, Cullingham ran for re-election to a third term. He was challenged by five opponents, and placed second in the primary, winning 33 percent of the vote to retired steel works executive Karl Vogel's 42 percent. In September, however, Cullingham ended his campaign and removed his name from the ballot, citing his business interests.

== Death ==
Cullingham died on July 29, 1983.
