= Henry Pedersen Jr. =

American politician (1929–2024)

Member of the Nebraska Legislature from the 4th district
- In office January 5, 1965 – January 5, 1971
- Preceded by: Michael Russillo (redistricted)
- Succeeded by: P. J. Morgan

Personal details
- Born: December 16, 1929 Omaha, Nebraska
- Died: November 10, 2024 (aged 94) Estes Park, Colorado
- Party: Republican
- Spouse: Sara Campbell (m. 1955)
- Children: 2 (Scott, Lisa)
- Education: University of Omaha; University of Nebraska; Creighton University School of Law (LL.B.)
- Occupation: Attorney

Military service
- Allegiance: United States
- Branch/service: United States Army Reserve
- Unit: Judge Advocate

Henry Frederick Pedersen Jr. (December 16, 1929 – November 10, 2024) was a Republican politician from Nebraska who served as a member of the Nebraska Legislature from the 4th district from 1965 to 1971.

== Early life ==
Pedersen was born in Omaha, Nebraska, in 1929, and graduated from Omaha Central High School. He attended the University of Omaha and the University of Nebraska, ultimately graduating from the Creighton University School of Law with his bachelor of laws degree in 1953. Pedersen practiced law in North Platte before returning to Omaha, where he joined the firm of Crossman, Barton and Norris and served as the chairman of the Douglas County Republican Party. Pedersen served in the United States Army Reserve as a Judge Advocate, eventually retiring as a lieutenant colonel.

== Nebraska Legislature ==
In 1964, Pedersen ran for the state legislature from the redrawn 4th district. Incumbent State Senator Michael Russillo, who represented the previous 9th district, declined to seek re-election. He faced a crowded field of opponents in the nonpartisan primary, and ran against Lawrence Shaw and Richard Dustin, fellow attorneys; salesman Milton Soskin; cosmetologist Woodrow Fleming; and trade school owner George Abdouch. Pedersen placed second in the primary, winning 29 percent of the vote to Shaw's 38 percent, and they advanced to the general election. Pedersen narrowly defeated Shaw, winning the general election with 53 percent of the vote to Shaw's 47 percent.

Pedersen ran for re-election in 1966. He was challenged by former State Senator Michael Russillo, attorney Robert Oberbillig, and perennial candidate Thomas O'Connor. In the primary election, Russillo placed first, receiving 44 percent of the vote to Pedersen's 38 percent, and they advanced to the general election. Pedersen defeated Russillo, winning his second term, 56–44 percent.

== Post-legislative career ==
In 1969, Pedersen declined to seek re-election, and instead announced that he would run for Lieutenant Governor in 1970. He was defeated by Secretary of State Frank Marsh in the Republican primary in a landslide, winning 29 percent of the vote to Marsh's 62 percent. After the primary, conservative Republicans attempted to recruit a candidate to challenge Republican Governor Norbert Tiemann in the general election as an independent, and Pedersen was lobbied to run. However, Pedersen declined to run, and instead endorsed Tiemann, giving him his "wholehearted support" in the general election.

Pedersen and his wife moved to Estes Park, Colorado, in 1973, where he established his legal practice.

== Death ==
Pedersen died on November 10, 2024.
