= Michael Russillo =

American politician and United States Navy admiral (1905–2004)

Member of the Nebraska Legislature from the 9th district
- In office January 6, 1959 – January 5, 1965
- Preceded by: Karl Vogel
- Succeeded by: Henry Pedersen Jr.

Personal details
- Born: October 24, 1905 New Rochelle, New York
- Died: December 30, 2004 (aged 99) Williamsburg, Virginia
- Party: Republican
- Spouse: Christina A. Gallagher (m. 1928; died 1999)
- Children: 3
- Education: United States Naval Academy
- Awards: Silver Star; Prisoner of War Medal; Legion of Merit

Military service
- Allegiance: United States
- Branch/service: United States Navy
- Rank: Rear admiral
- Battles/wars: World War II; Korean War

Michael Peter Russillo (October 24, 1905 – December 30, 2004) was a Republican politician from Nebraska who served as a member of the Nebraska Legislature from the 9th district from 1959 to 1965. He served in the U.S. Navy during World War II and the Korean War and retired as a Rear Admiral.

Russillo was appointed to the Nebraska Legislature in 1959 by Governor Victor Anderson following the resignation of State Senator Karl Vogel. He was elected in 1960 and re-elected in 1962, and declined to seek a third term in 1964. In 1966, Russillo challenged State Senator Henry Pedersen Jr. for re-election in the 4th district, but lost.

Russillo died on December 30, 2004.
