= Amos Thomas (Nebraska politician) =

American politician (1882–1962)

Member of the Nebraska Legislature from the 9th district
- In office January 5, 1937 – January 5, 1943
- Preceded by: Position created
- Succeeded by: Sidney Cullingham

Personal details
- Born: August 30, 1882 Milwaukee, Wisconsin
- Died: November 2, 1962 (aged 80) Santa Barbara, California
- Party: Republican
- Spouse: Gertrude Owen (m. 1917)
- Education: University of Nebraska (LL.B.)
- Occupation: Engineer, attorney

Military service
- Allegiance: United States
- Branch/service: Nebraska National Guard

Amos Thomas (August 30, 1882 – November 2, 1962) was a Republican politician from Nebraska who served as a member of the Nebraska Legislature from the 9th district from 1937 to 1943.

Thomas born was in Milwaukee, Wisconsin, in 1882, and moved to Seward County, Nebraska, in 1886. He worked as a wood preservation engineer and graduated from the University of Nebraska with his bachelor of laws degree in 1909. Thomas practiced as an attorney in Omaha, working as an assistant state attorney general from 1919 to 1920. He served in the Nebraska National Guard and was the chairman of the Douglas County Republican Party.

In 1936, Thomas was elected to the Nebraska Legislature from the 9th district. He was re-elected in 1938 and 1940. He commanded the 69th Infantry Brigade during World War II and declined to seek re-election in 1962.

Thomas died on November 2, 1961, in Santa Barbara, California.
