= Karl Vogel =

American politician (1884–1959)

Member of the Nebraska Legislature from the 9th district
- In office January 7, 1947 – January 6, 1959
- Preceded by: Sidney Cullingham
- Succeeded by: Michael Russillo

Personal details
- Born: 1884 Chelsea, Michigan
- Died: February 9, 1959 (aged 74–75) Omaha, Nebraska
- Party: Republican
- Spouse: Mary Celina Wood (m. 1913)
- Children: 3
- Education: University of Michigan
- Occupation: Engineer, business executive

Karl Eugen Vogel (1884 – February 9, 1959) was a Republican politician from Nebraska who served as a member of the Nebraska Legislature from the 9th district from 1947 to 1959.

== Early life ==
Vogel was born in Chelsea, Michigan, in 1884, and graduated from Chelsea High School. He attended the University of Michigan, graduating from the College of Engineering. Vogel worked as an engineer, and in 1911, he moved to Omaha, Nebraska, and was one of the founders of the Omaha Steel Works. Vogel was the superintendent of the plant and retired in 1946.

== Nebraska Legislature ==
In 1946, State Senator Sidney Cullingham ran for re-election, and Vogel challenged him in the 9th district. In the nonpartisan primary, Vogel placed first, winning 42 percent of the vote to Cullingham's 33 percent, and they advanced to the general election. Several months prior to the election, Cullingham withdrew from the election, citing his need to focus on his business interests. Jewelry salesman Jerome McGargill, who placed third in the primary, replaced Cullingham on the general election ballot. Vogel defeated McCargill in a landslide, winning 69 percent of the vote to McCargill's 31 percent.

Vogel ran for re-election in 1948, and was challenged by salesman Edmund Caldwell. In the primary election, Vogel placed first with 63 percent of the vote, and in the general election, defeated Caldwell by an identical margin.

In 1950, Vogel sought a third term. He faced a crowded field of opponents, with Caldwell, attorney Paul Manhart, businessman Homer Rose, and insurance agent Robert Wear all filing to run against him. He received 47 percent of the vote in the primary election, and advanced to the general election with Wear, who placed second with 17 percent. Vogel defeated Wear by a landslide, receiving 63 percent of the vote to Wear's 37 percent.

Vogel ran for a fourth term in 1952, and was opposed by insurance agent William Thayer. Vogel won 69 percent of the vote in the primary election to Thayer's 31 percent, and defeated him with 67 percent of the vote in the general election.

In 1954, he sought a fifth term, and was challenged by Merrill Hewitt, an advertising executive and former political science prfoessor. Vogel won 69 percent of the vote in the primary election to Hewitt's 31 percent, and they advanced to the general election. One month before the general election, however, Hewitt withdrew from the race, and Vogel was re-elected unopposed.

Vogel ran for re-election to a sixth term in 1956. He was challenged by high school teacher Verna Dillow, real estate broker Owen Giles, accountant John McKernan, and Creighton law student Arthur O'Leary. Vogel won 43 percent of the vote in the primary and proceeded to the general election with Dillow, who won 18 percent of the vote and narrowly defeated O'Leary for second place. Vogel ultimately defeated Dillow, winning 54 percent of the vote to her 46 percent, one of the closest legislative elections in metropolitan Omaha.

In 1958, Vogel ran for re-election, and was opposed by salesman Marcus Joffe. Vogel received 80 percent of the vote in the primary election to Joffe's 20 percent. In the general election, Vogel defeated Joffe in a landslide, winning his seventh term, 71–29 percent.

On December 30, 1958, Vogel announced that he would not take his seat in the legislature, and would resign on January 6, 1959, citing his ill health.

== Death ==
Vogel died on February 9, 1959.
