= Chartley, Massachusetts =

Village in Norton, Massachusetts

Chartley
- Village
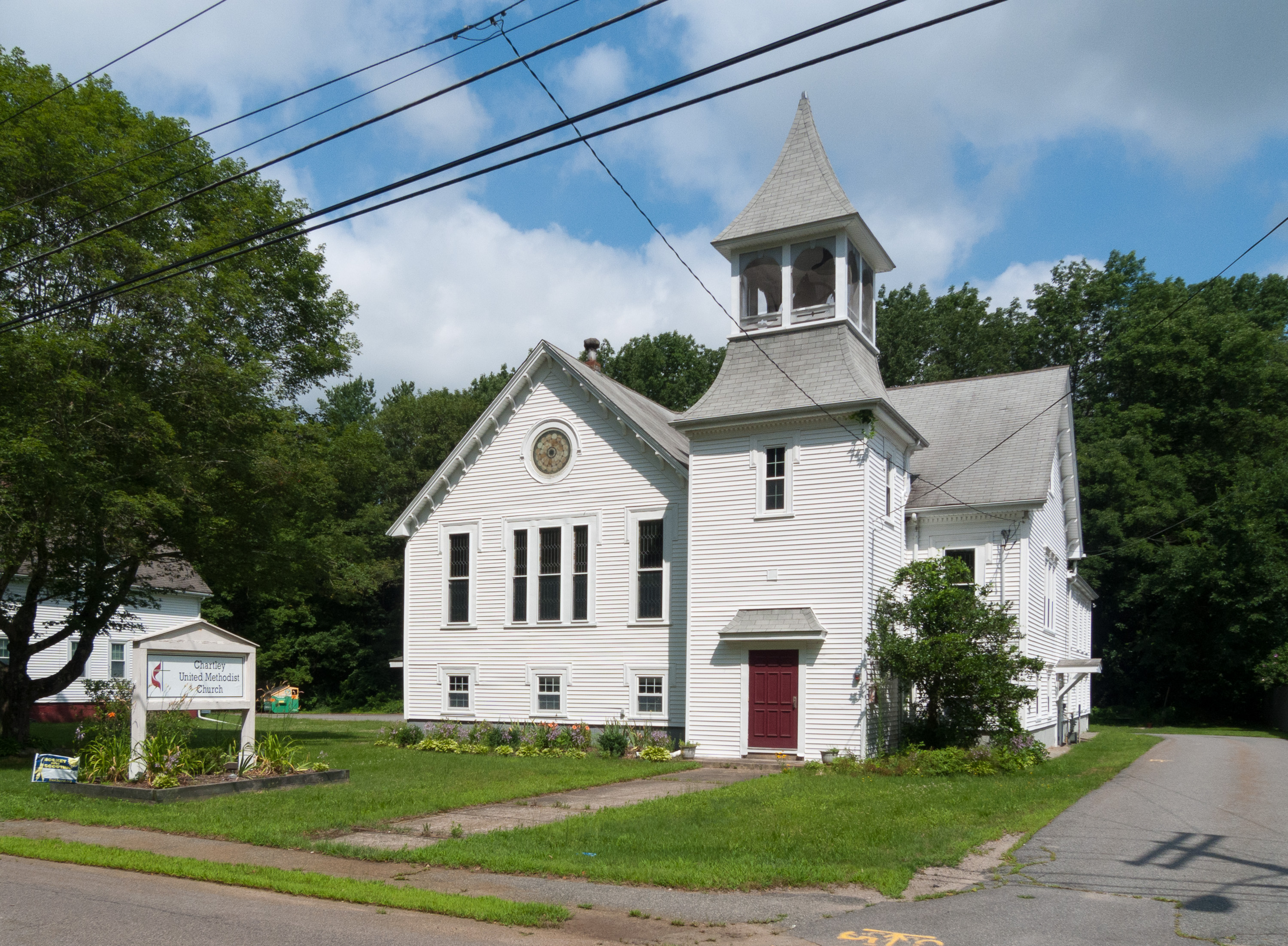
- Chartley United Methodist Church
- Interactive map of Chartley
- Coordinates: 41.9487110°N 71.2258839°W
- Country: United States
- State: Massachusetts
- County: Bristol County
- Town: Norton

Chartley is a village in Norton, Massachusetts. It has its own post office, near the Attleboro line along Route 123, with zip code 02712.

Some notable places and historic locations in Chartley include Chartley Pond, formed by excavations for iron in the 17th and 18th centuries; Chartley Methodist Church; Chartley Train Station which operated in the early and mid-1900s; and Chartley Country Store, which was open from the mid-1970s to 2021."

The village is located 3.3 miles from downtown Attleboro and 2.8 miles from Norton Center.

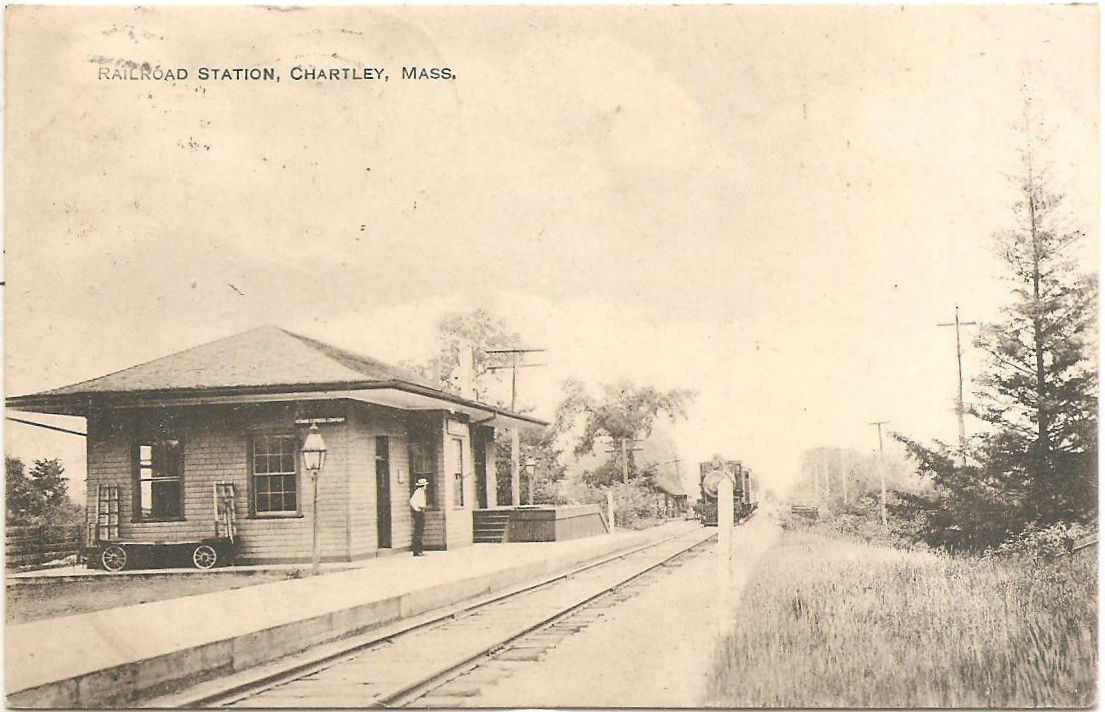
Chartley Station in 1914

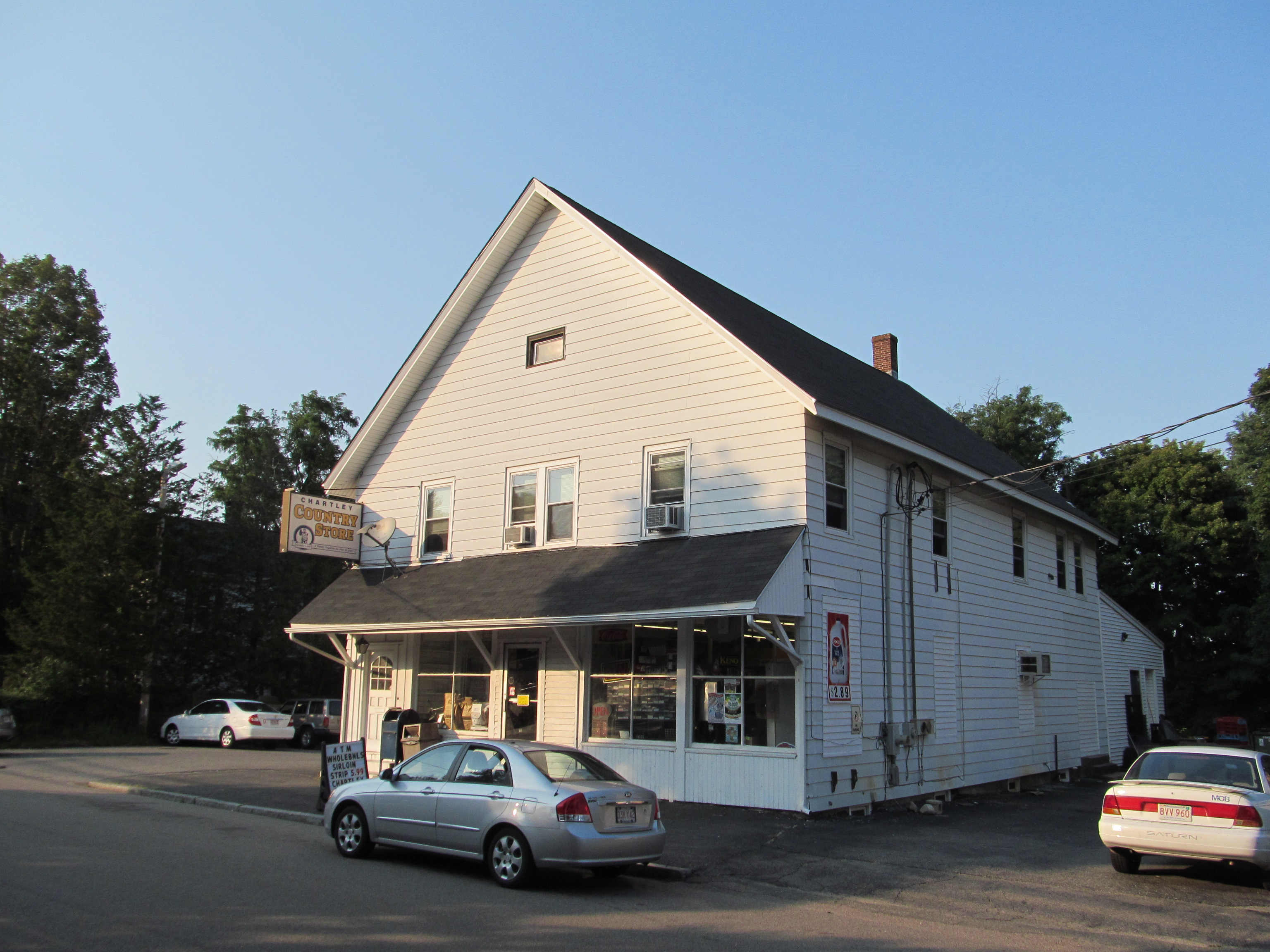
Chartley Country Store in 2012
