= D. Thomas Russillo =

American architect

D(omenic) Thomas Russillo
- Born: March 9, 1902; Providence, Rhode Island
- Died: 1978 / 1980; Cranston, Rhode Island
- Known for: Architect

Domenic Thomas Russillo, AIA (1902-1980), was a minor American architect who practiced in mid-20th-century Rhode Island and Massachusetts.

== Early life and education ==
Russillo was born March 9, 1902, in Providence, Rhode Island, and educated at the Rhode Island School of Design from 1922 to 1924 and the Massachusetts Institute of Technology in 1926.

== Career ==
Russillo began his career as a designer for the architectural firm of Jackson, Robertson & Adams, working there from 1928 to 1932. He started his own firm, D. Thomas Russillo in 1933 during the Great Depression, eventually registering as an architect in Massachusetts and Rhode Island. He became a member of the Rhode Island Chapter of the AIA in 1944. As of 1970, he worked at 334 Westminster Mall, Providence. William Mackenzie Woodward of the Rhode Island Historical Preservation and Heritage Commission declared that "Russillo was clearly aware of and more than merely competent in producing designs within the contemporary mainstream." Many of Russillo's residential designs can be found "on the East Side in the Blackstone Boulevard area, as well as the Smith Hill neighborhood. Most of these houses are Moderne- or Frank-Lloyd-Wright-inspired designs."

== Personal life ==
As of 1970, he lived at 66 S. Hill Dr, Cranston. The AIA was notified of his death in 1980.

== Works ==
- Anthony Gizzarelli House, 665 Pleasant Valley Pkwy., Providence, RI (1947)
- Israel Sarat House, 6 Holly St., Providence, RI (1948)
- Anson Building, 24 Baker St., Providence, RI (1950)
- Louis Kirschenbaum House, 540 Blackstone Blvd., Providence, RI (1954)
- Leonard Levin House, 80 Clarendon Ave., Providence, RI (1954)
- Temple Beth-El, 145 Oakland Ave., Providence, RI (1954)
- Burleigh B. Greenberg House, 6 Woodland Ter., Providence, RI (1957–58)
- Peter Bardach House, 33 Intervale Rd., Providence, RI (1958)
- Jack G. Savran House, 8 Woodland Ter., Providence, RI (1959–61)
- Bellevue Shopping Center, 181 Bellevue Ave., Newport, RI (1960)
- Boy Scouts of America Building, 175 Broad St., Providence, RI (1962)
- Max Winograd House, 100 Clarendon Ave., Providence, RI (1962)
- Fall River Jewish Home for the Aged, 538 Robeson St., Fall River, MA (1967)
- Nortek Building, 815 Reservoir Ave., Cranston, RI (1969)
