= National Register of Historic Places listings in Middletown, Rhode Island =

This is a list of Registered Historic Places in Middletown, Rhode Island, which has been transferred from and is an integral part of National Register of Historic Places listings in Newport County, Rhode Island.

Contents: Counties in Rhode Island

Bristol | Kent | Newport | Providence | Washington

This National Park Service list is complete through NPS recent listings posted April 3, 2026.

	Name on the Register	Image	Date listed	Location	City or town	Description
1	Bailey Farm	Bailey Farm	June 4, 1984 (#84001887)	373 Wyatt Rd. 41°31′14″N 71°16′09″W	Middletown	
2	Boyd's Windmill	Boyd's Windmill	January 26, 2001 (#01000018)	Prospect Ave. 41°30′03″N 71°16′09″W	Middletown	
3	Clambake Club of Newport	Clambake Club of Newport	November 7, 1995 (#95001267)	353 Tuckerman Ave. 41°28′47″N 71°16′32″W	Middletown	
4	Gardiner Pond Shell Midden	Gardiner Pond Shell Midden	April 12, 1985 (#85000718)	On the grounds of the Norman Bird Sanctuary; 41°29′47″N 71°15′18″W	Middletown	
5	Hamilton Hoppin House	Hamilton Hoppin House	August 16, 1996 (#96000905)	120 Miantonomi Ave. 41°30′23″N 71°17′52″W	Middletown	
6	Lyman C. Josephs House	Lyman C. Josephs House	May 2, 1975 (#75000054)	438 Walcott Ave. 41°29′12″N 71°16′34″W	Middletown	Incorrectly listed as "Lyman C. Joseph House".
7	Dennis J. Murphy House at Ogden Farm	Dennis J. Murphy House at Ogden Farm	December 13, 2007 (#07001269)	641 Mitchell's Ln. 41°31′20″N 71°15′44″W	Middletown	
8	Paradise School	Paradise School	May 5, 1978 (#78000069)	Paradise and Prospect Aves. 41°30′06″N 71°16′08″W	Middletown	
9	Smith–Gardiner–Norman Farm Historic District	Smith–Gardiner–Norman Farm Historic District	June 16, 2008 (#08000234)	583 Third Beach Rd. 41°29′58″N 71°15′00″W	Middletown	Centerpiece of the Norman Bird Sanctuary.
10	St. George's School–Church of St. George, Little Chapel, and Memorial Schoolhouse	St. George's School–Church of St. George, Little Chapel, and Memorial Schoolhouse	November 12, 2004 (#04001235)	372 Purgatory Rd. 41°29′27″N 71°16′06″W	Middletown	
11	Stonybrook Estate Historic District	Stonybrook Estate Historic District	September 1, 2009 (#09000708)	501-521 Indian Ave. and 75 Vaucluse Ave. 41°30′23″N 71°14′31″W	Middletown	
12	Taylor–Chase–Smythe House	Taylor–Chase–Smythe House	August 30, 1989 (#89001220)	Chase Ln., Naval Education and Training Center; 41°31′30″N 71°19′07″W	Middletown	
13	Whitehall	Whitehall	April 28, 1970 (#70000016)	Berkeley Ave. 41°30′50″N 71°16′20″W	Middletown	
14	Witherbee School	Witherbee School	November 27, 1989 (#89002036)	Green End Ave. 41°30′23″N 71°17′21″W	Middletown	part of the Middletown MPS

== See also ==
- National Register of Historic Places listings in Newport County, Rhode Island
- List of National Historic Landmarks in Rhode Island
