= National Register of Historic Places listings in Portsmouth, Rhode Island =

This is a list of Registered Historic Places in Portsmouth, Rhode Island, which has been transferred from and is an integral part of National Register of Historic Places listings in Newport County, Rhode Island.

Contents: Counties in Rhode Island

Bristol | Kent | Newport | Providence (Pawtucket | Providence (city) | Woonsocket) | Washington

This National Park Service list is complete through NPS recent listings posted May 1, 2026.

	Name on the Register	Image	Date listed	Location	City or town	Description
1	Battle of Rhode Island Site	Battle of Rhode Island Site	May 30, 1974 (#74002054)	Lehigh Hill and both sides of RI 24 between Medley and Dexter Sts. 41°36′12″N 71°15′31″W	Portsmouth	Inconclusive battle in 1778. Only Revolutionary War battle in which a segregated African-American unit fought (support logistics, 2 killed).
2	Borden Farm	Borden Farm	June 5, 2007 (#07000528)	2951 and 2967 E. Main Rd. 41°36′32″N 71°14′45″W	Portsmouth	
3	Farnham Farm		February 2, 2006 (#05001617)	113 Mount Pleasant Ave. 41°35′52″N 71°19′22″W	Portsmouth	
4	Greenvale Farm	Greenvale Farm	January 4, 1980 (#80000082)	582 Wapping Rd. 41°32′05″N 71°14′18″W	Portsmouth	19th century estate house on the water below Greenvale Vineyard.
5	Hog Island Shoal Lighthouse	Hog Island Shoal Lighthouse	March 30, 1988 (#88000282)	S of Hog Island, E passage, Narrangansett Bay; 41°37′56″N 71°16′25″W	Portsmouth	
6	Lawton-Almy-Hall Farm	Lawton-Almy-Hall Farm	October 11, 1978 (#78000068)	559 Union St. 41°33′35″N 71°16′31″W	Portsmouth	
7	Mount Hope Bridge	Mount Hope Bridge	January 31, 1976 (#76000038)	RI 114 over Narragansett Bay; 41°38′25″N 71°15′32″W	Portsmouth	Longest bridge in New England for over 40 years
8	Oak Glen	Oak Glen	March 29, 1978 (#78003444)	745 Union St. 41°33′33″N 71°16′53″W	Portsmouth	
9	Pine Hill Archeological Site, RI-655		November 3, 1983 (#83003803)	Address Restricted	Portsmouth	
10	Portsmouth Friends Meetinghouse Parsonage and Cemetery	Portsmouth Friends Meetinghouse Parsonage and Cemetery	March 7, 1973 (#73000053)	11 Middle Rd. and 2232 E. Main Rd. 41°35′27″N 71°15′14″W	Portsmouth	
11	Prudence Island Lighthouse	Prudence Island Lighthouse	March 30, 1988 (#88000270)	Eastern end of Sandy Pt. on Prudence Island; 41°36′20″N 71°18′11″W	Portsmouth	part of the Lighthouses of Rhode Island TR
12	Union Church	Union Church	June 13, 1974 (#74000045)	Union St. and E. Main Rd. 41°33′30″N 71°15′22″W	Portsmouth	
13	Wreck Sites of H.M.S. Cerberus and H.M.S. Lark	Wreck Sites of H.M.S. Cerberus and H.M.S. Lark	April 26, 1973 (#73000061)	Waters of Narragansett Bay adjacent to Aquidneck Island; 41°35′04″N 71°18′19″W	South Portsmouth	

== See also ==
- National Register of Historic Places listings in Newport County, Rhode Island
- List of National Historic Landmarks in Rhode Island
