= Alexander Van Rensselaer House =

Historic house in Rhode Island, United States

- U.S. National Register of Historic Places
- Location within Rhode Island Location within the United States
- Location: 1 Ichabod Ln., Middletown, Rhode Island
- Coordinates: 41°30′23″N 71°17′17″W
- Area: less than one acre
- Built: 1857
- Architect: Upjohn, Richard
- Architectural style: Italianate
- NRHP reference No.: 100002524
- Added to NRHP: June 4, 2018

The Alexander Van Rensselaer House, also known historically as Restmere and Villalou, is a historic house at 1 Ichabod Lane in Middletown, Rhode Island. Built in 1857, it is a prominent example of Italianate architecture, designed by Richard Upjohn, with some of the earliest examples of Stick style decoration in the United States. It was added to the National Register of Historic Places in 2018.

== Description and history ==
The Alexander Van Rensselaer House stands in southwestern Middletown, not far from the Newport line on the north side of Miantonomi Avenue. It is set on a remnant of its original 5-acre (2.0 ha) estate, whose drives are now designated Ichabod Lane and Restmere Terrace. It is a three-story wood-frame structure, covered by a hip roof and finished in wooden clapboards. The roof eave is extended and studded with modillion blocks, above an extended frieze band with applied Stick style decoration, small windows, and drop pendants. A single-story porch extends across the three-bay front facade, with rounded columns rising to rounded arches. A low balustrade echoes the rounded arches between the columns, and along the sides of the flared stair that provides access to the porch.

The house was built in 1857 for Alexander Van Rensselaer, a New York City businessman. He had married into the Howland family, who had summered in Newport since the 1830s. Richard Upjohn was retained to design this house, as well as the neighboring Hamilton Hoppin House, built for Van Rensselaer's brother-in-law and family. The two houses were set on nearly identical parcels, which were landscaped together by a series of meandering paths. The house was completed in 1857, two years after the death of Van Rensselaer's wife. His family maintained ownership of the property until 1904. Adolph Louis Audrain, the next owner, undertook significant renovations, and dubbed the estate "Restmere".

== See also ==
- National Register of Historic Places listings in Newport County, Rhode Island
