= Gardiner Pond Shell Midden =

- U.S. National Register of Historic Places
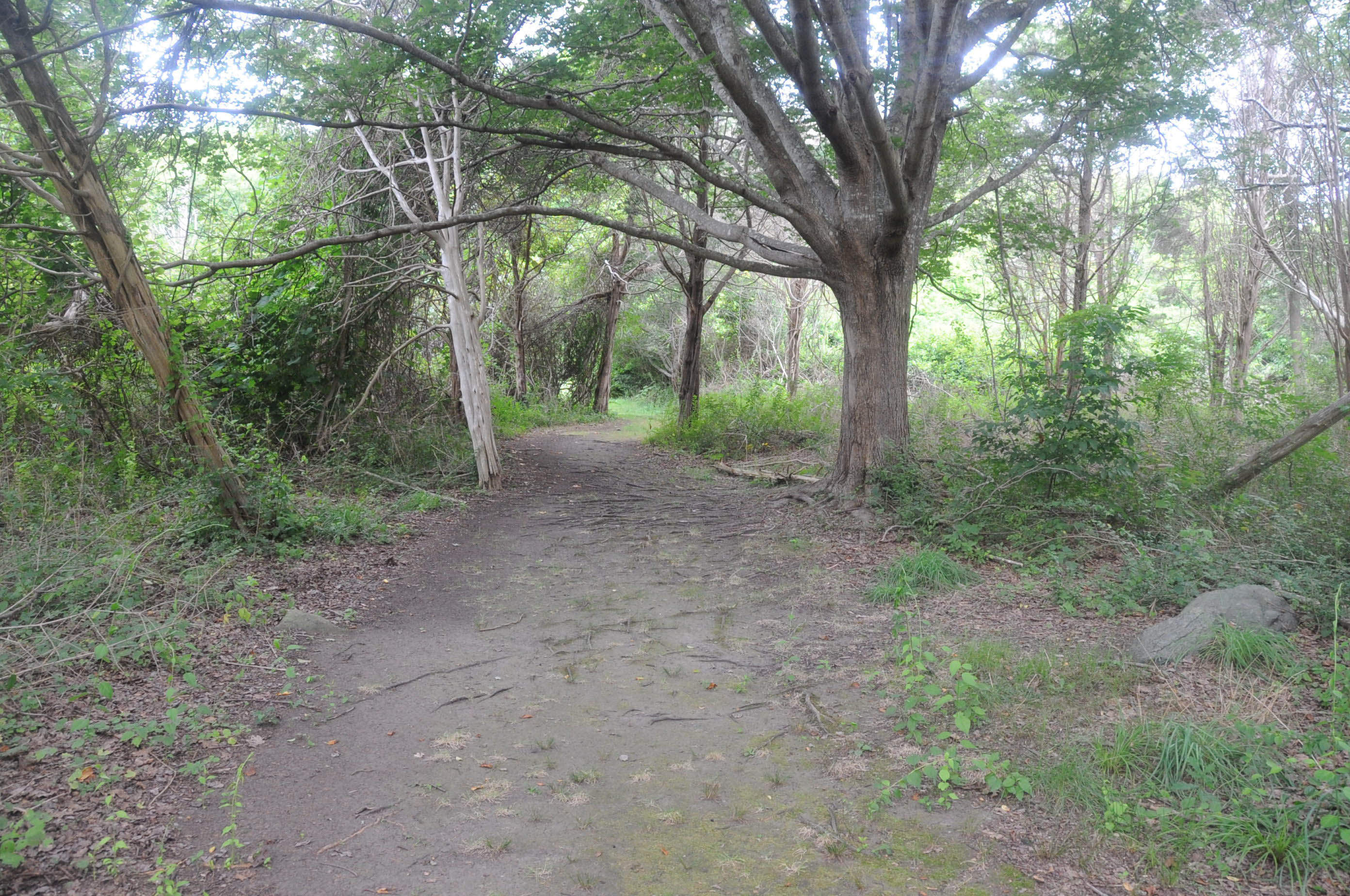
- Location: Middletown, Rhode Island
- Coordinates: 41°29′47″N 71°15′18″W
- NRHP reference No.: 85000718
- Added to NRHP: April 12, 1985

The Gardiner Pond Shell Midden (also known as RI-101W) is a prehistoric archaeological site in Middletown, Rhode Island, named after George Gardiner who was an early settler in the area. The site includes a large shell midden, in which archaeological finds have been made dating the area's human habitation to the Middle and Late Woodland Period. Finds at the site include agricultural tools such as hoes, planting tools, and stone mortars and pestles. The midden is on the grounds of the Norman Bird Sanctuary.

The site was listed on the National Register of Historic Places in 1985.

== See also ==
- National Register of Historic Places listings in Newport County, Rhode Island
