= John Tillinghast House =

Historic house in Rhode Island, United States

- U.S. National Register of Historic Places
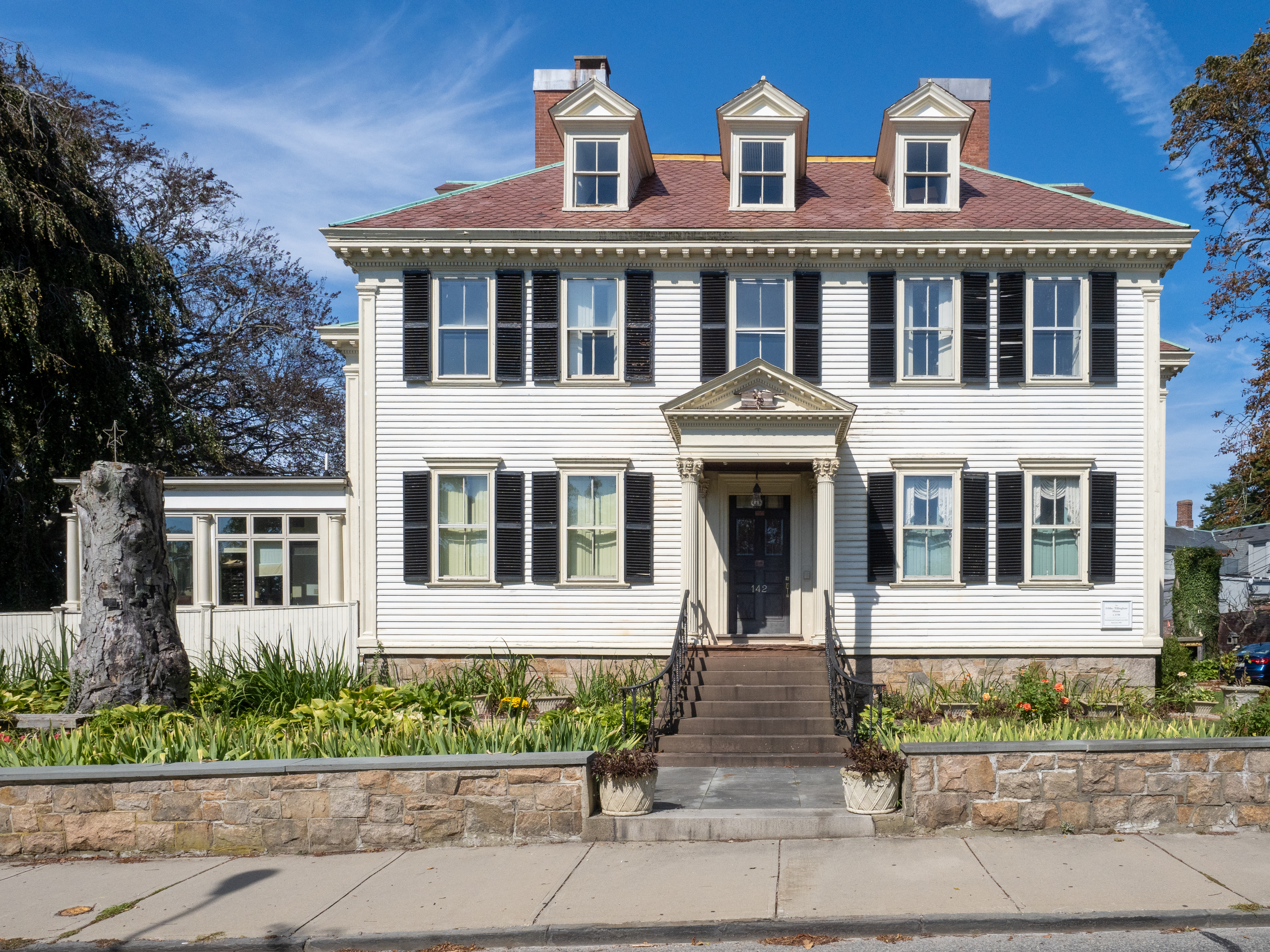

- Location within Rhode Island Location within the United States
- Location: 142 Mill Street, Newport, Rhode Island
- Coordinates: 41°29′11″N 71°18′37″W
- Built: 1760
- Architectural style: Georgian
- NRHP reference No.: 73000060
- Added to NRHP: April 11, 1973

The John Tillinghast House is an historic colonial house in Newport, Rhode Island. It is a 2 1/2-story wood-frame structure, built in 1760 for John Tillinghast, a wealthy merchant. A high-quality example of academic Georgian architecture, the house was a (often temporary) home for a number of notable people during and after the American Revolutionary War. It was probably occupied by the Marquis de Chastellux, an engineer in the French Army while he was stationed in Newport, and by General Nathanael Greene, who hosted George Washington and the Marquis de Lafayette on a visit to Newport. From 1821 to 1824 it was home to William C. Gibbs while he was Governor of Rhode Island.

The house was listed on the National Register of Historic Places on April 11, 1973.

== See also ==
- National Register of Historic Places listings in Newport County, Rhode Island
