= Lawton–Almy–Hall Farm =

Historic house in Rhode Island, United States

- U.S. National Register of Historic Places
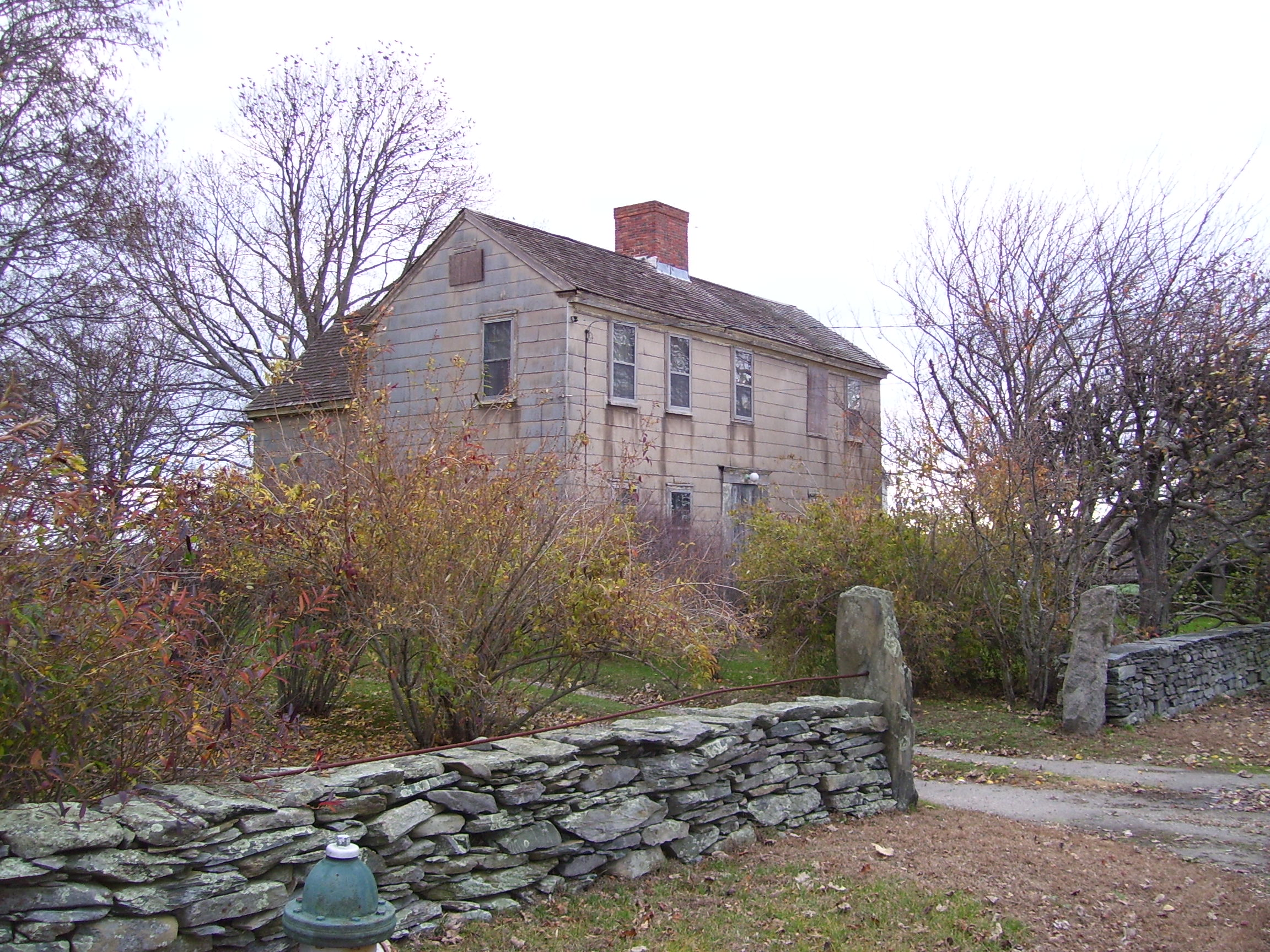
- Lawton–Almy–Hall Farm in 2008

- Location within Rhode Island Location within the United States
- Location: Portsmouth, Rhode Island
- Coordinates: 41°33′35″N 71°16′31″W
- Area: 40 acres (16 ha)
- NRHP reference No.: 78000068
- Added to NRHP: October 11, 1978

The Lawton–Almy–Hall Farm is an historic farm at 559 Union Street in Portsmouth, Rhode Island. The farm comprises 40 acres (16 ha) of land, and a well-preserved farm complex with elements dating to the 18th century. The land was first granted in 1648 to George Lawton, and was owned by six generations of the family. It was acquired in 1832 by Peleg Almy, whose family owned it until 1938, when it was sold to the Halls. The farmhouse is one of the oldest in the area, with its northern section estimated to have been built about 1700, based on stylistic resemblance to the Quaker Meetinghouse (c. 1699) and a local schoolhouse (c. 1725).

The farm was listed on the National Register of Historic Places in 1978.

== See also ==
- National Register of Historic Places listings in Newport County, Rhode Island
