= Green's End, Rhode Island =

Village in Middletown, Rhode Island, U.S.

Coordinates: 41°30′23″N 71°17′21″W

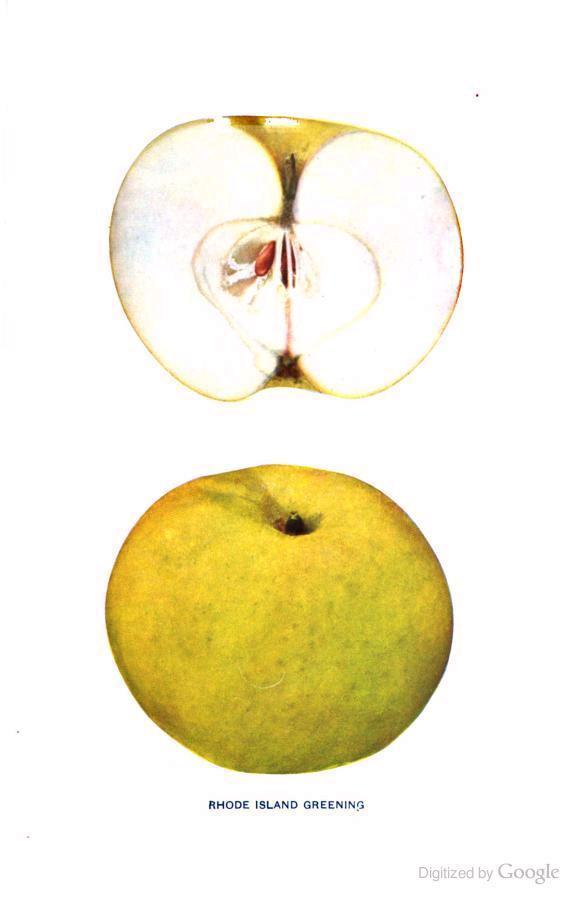
The Rhode Island Greening apple was developed near Green's End.

Green's End is a historic village and populated area in Middletown, Rhode Island, United States. Witherbee School (1900) is located in the area.

== History ==
Green's End is also the name of the main road in the area, as well that of a large body of water.

Circa 1650 the state fruit, the Rhode Island Greening, was developed in Green's End by Mr. Green, a local tavern owner who operated Green's Inn. Greening would grow and give grafts of the Rhode Island Greening to passersby. The Rhode Island Greening was one of the most popular apples grown in New York in the nineteenth century.

One of the first Baptist churches in the United States was founded in Green's End in 1644. It is now known as United Baptist Church.

Green End Fort was long thought to have been built during the American Revolution in 1777 by British troops occupying Newport, as the eastern terminus of their defensive works in the area. More recent scholarship indicates it was more probably built by the French army in 1780 during its occupation of Newport. It is one of the few remaining earthwork fortifications in the state of Rhode Island.

== See also ==
- List of Registered Historic Places in Rhode Island
