= The Bird's Nest (house) =

Historic house in Rhode Island, United States

- U.S. National Register of Historic Places
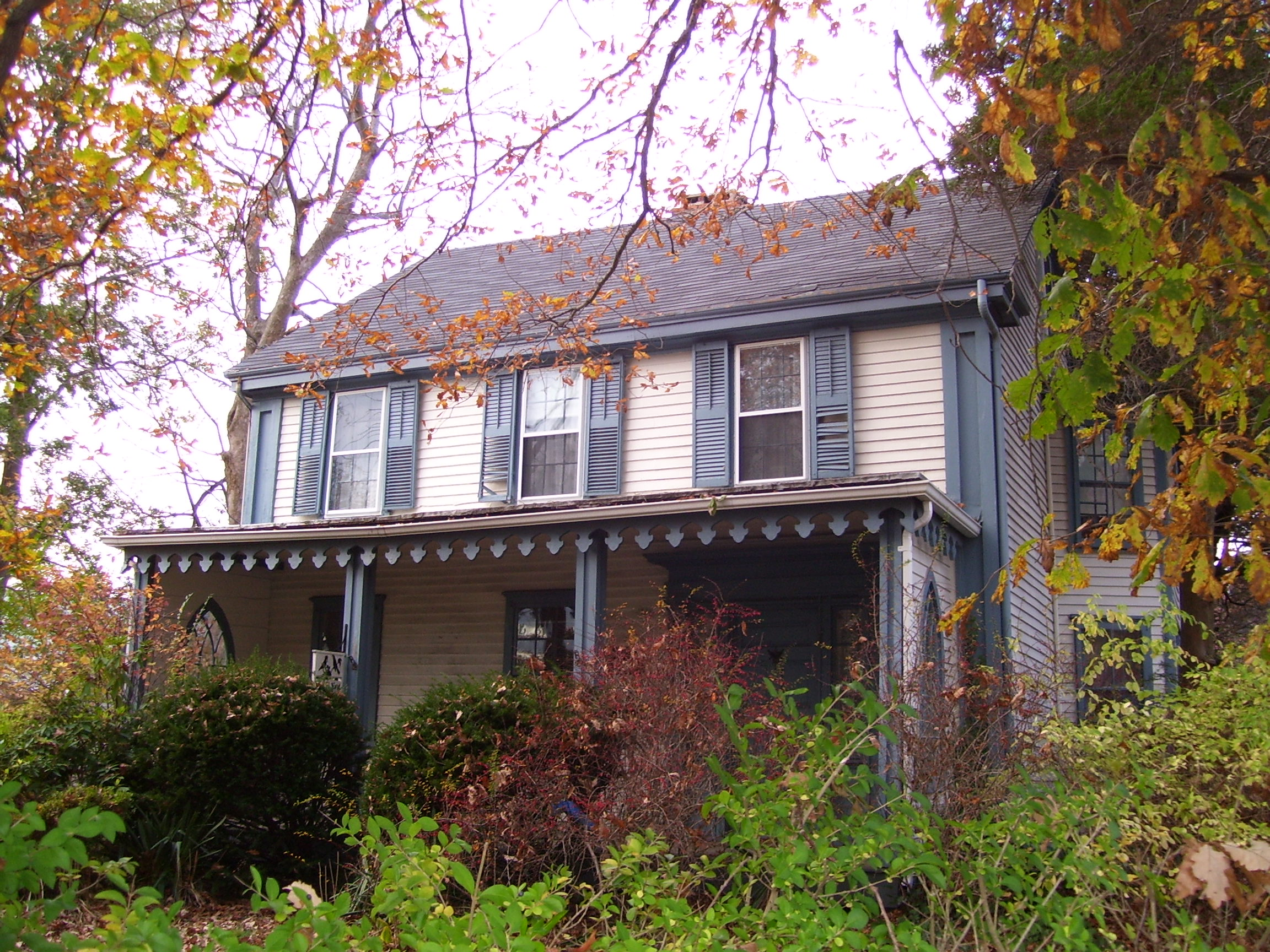

- Location within Rhode Island Location within the United States
- Location: Newport, RI
- Coordinates: 41°30′21″N 71°18′9″W
- Area: less than one acre
- Built: c. 1725–50
- NRHP reference No.: 82000130
- Added to NRHP: 1982

The Bird's Nest is a historic house at 526 Broadway at the One Mile Corner junction in Newport, Rhode Island, not far from the city line with Middletown. It is a 2 1/2-story wood-frame structure, three bays wide and two deep, with a gable roof and a large central chimney. A two-story ell extends from the rear of the house, and there are smaller additions which further enlarge the house by small amounts. An early 20th-century garage stands behind the house. The oldest portion of the house is estimated to have been built between 1725 and 1750, with most of the alterations coming in the 19th century, giving the house a vernacular mix of Federal, Greek Revival, and Gothic Revival elements. It was given its name by Dr. Rowland Hazard, who bought the property in the 1840s and used it as a summer retreat.

The house was listed on the National Register of Historic Places in 1982.

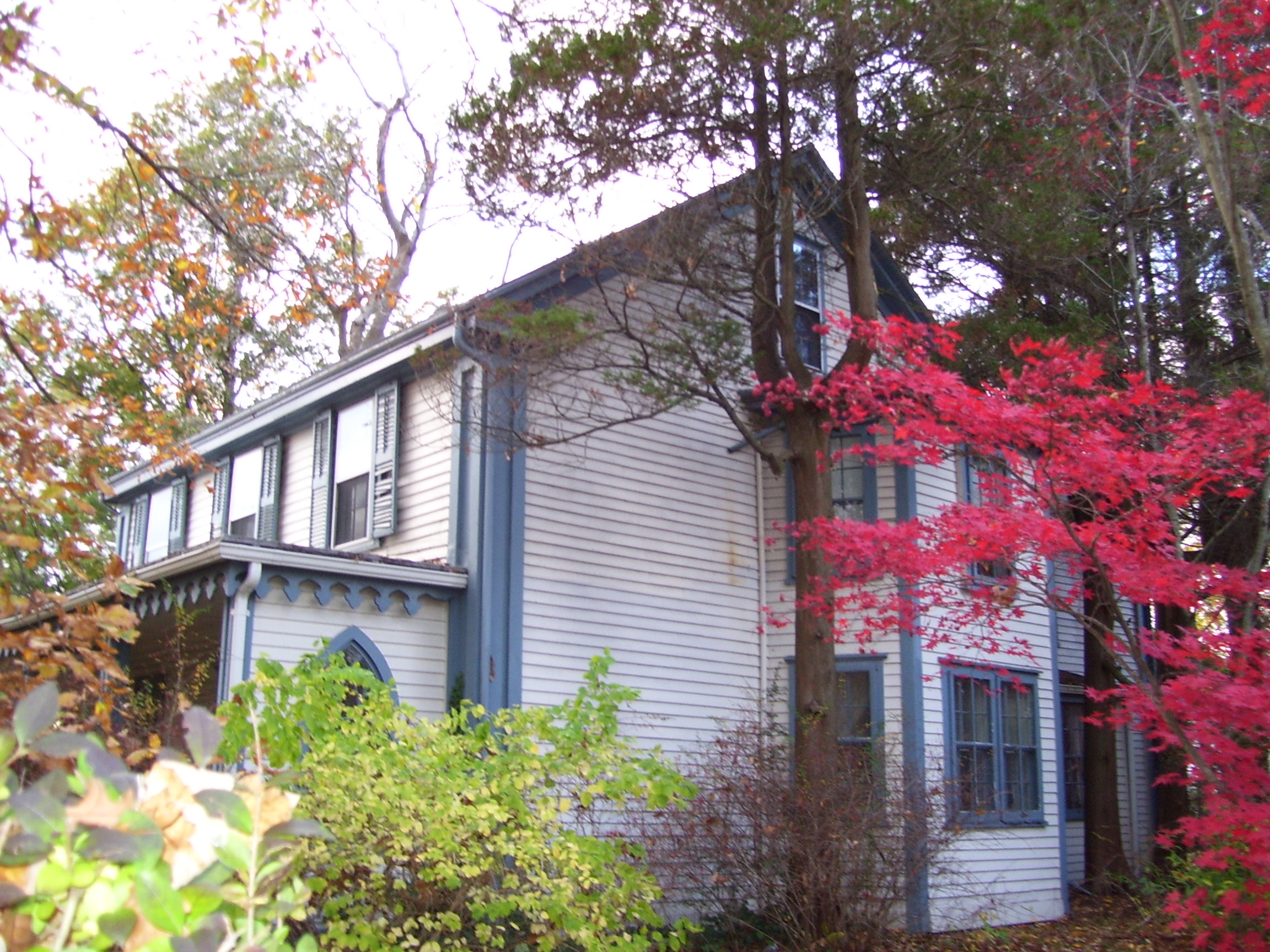

== See also ==
- National Register of Historic Places listings in Newport County, Rhode Island
