= Joseph Hicks House =

Historic house in Rhode Island, United States

Coordinates: 41.660108°N 71.190369°W

- U.S. National Register of Historic Places
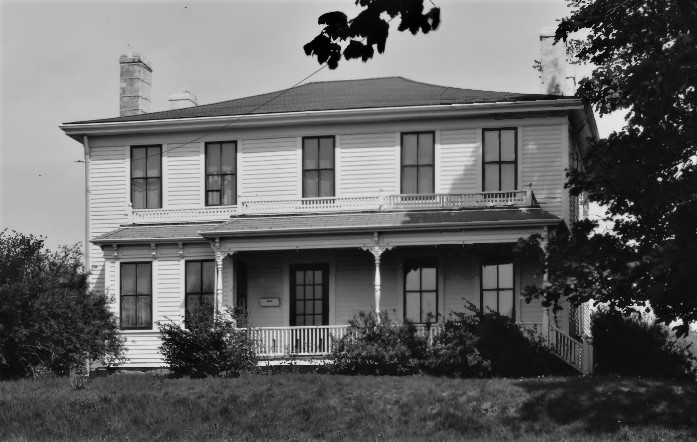
- (May 1978)

- Location within Rhode Island Location within the United States
- Location: Tiverton, RI
- Area: 3.5 acres (1.4 ha)
- Built: 1788
- Architectural style: Federal
- NRHP reference No.: 79000053
- Added to NRHP: September 10, 1979

The Joseph Hicks House was a historic house at 494 Main Road in Tiverton, Rhode Island. The house was a two-story wood-frame structure, which was originally built with brick side walls, and became known locally as "the Brick House". These walls were covered over by clapboarding as part of a series of alterations in 1893, which did not otherwise significant obscure the building's modest Federal characteristics. The main facade was five bays wide, with a hip roof that has eaves deeper than normally found on Federal houses. The Hicks family, which owned it for many years, was one of the first to settle in the Tiverton area.

The house was listed on the National Register of Historic Places in 1979. It was demolished in the 1980s for the construction of a CVS Pharmacy, which is now Tom's Market.

== See also ==
- National Register of Historic Places listings in Newport County, Rhode Island
