= Sachuest Point National Wildlife Refuge =

Wildlife refuge in Middletown, Rhode Island

- IUCN category IV (habitat/species management area)
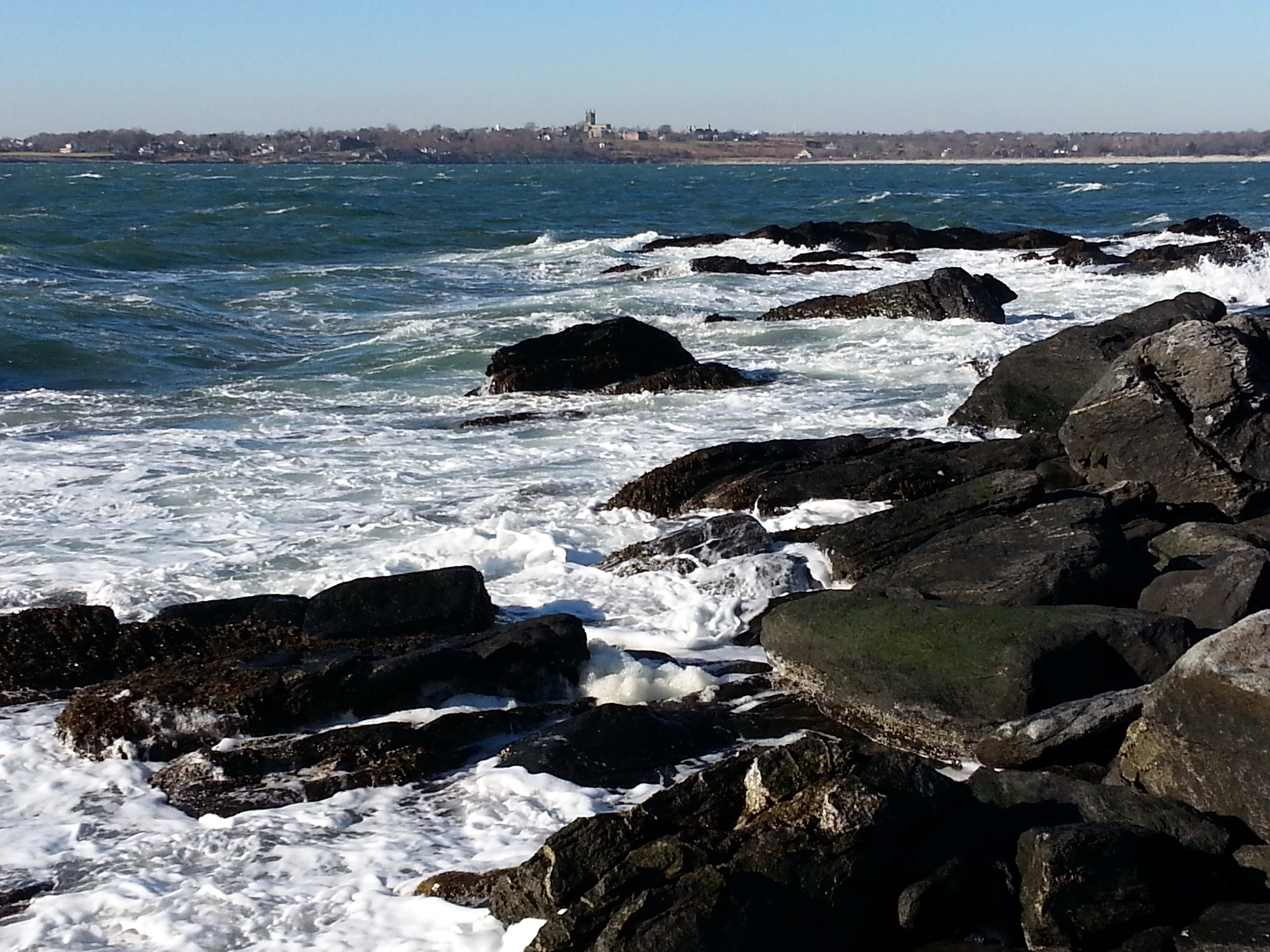

- Location within Rhode Island
- Location: Newport County, Rhode Island, United States
- Nearest city: Middletown, Rhode Island
- Coordinates: 41°28′47″N 71°14′28″W
- Area: 242 acres (0.98 km^{2})
- Established: 1970
- Governing body: U.S. Fish and Wildlife Service
- Website: Sachuest Point National Wildlife Refuge

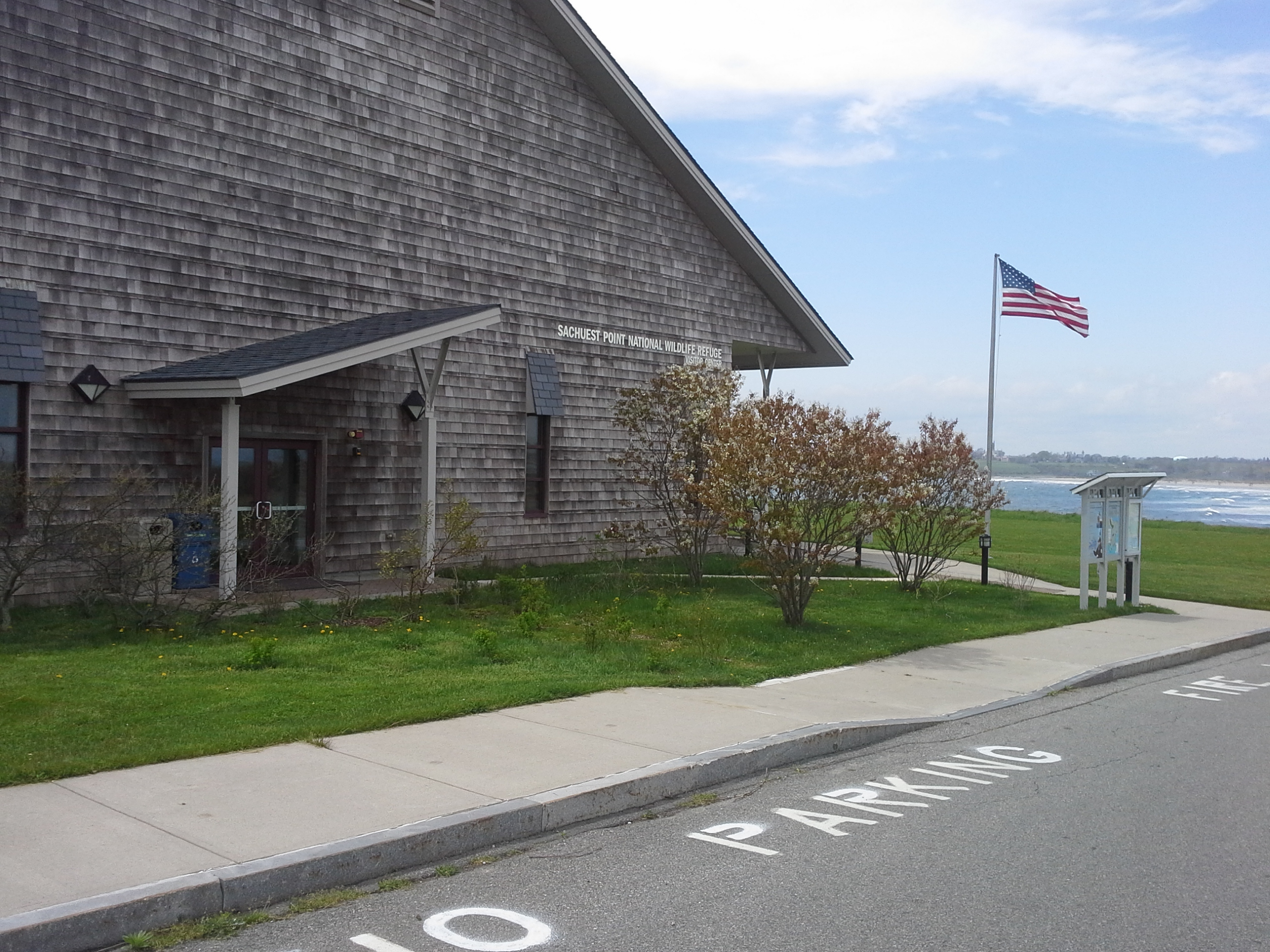
Sachuest Point National Wildlife Refuge in Middletown, Rhode Island

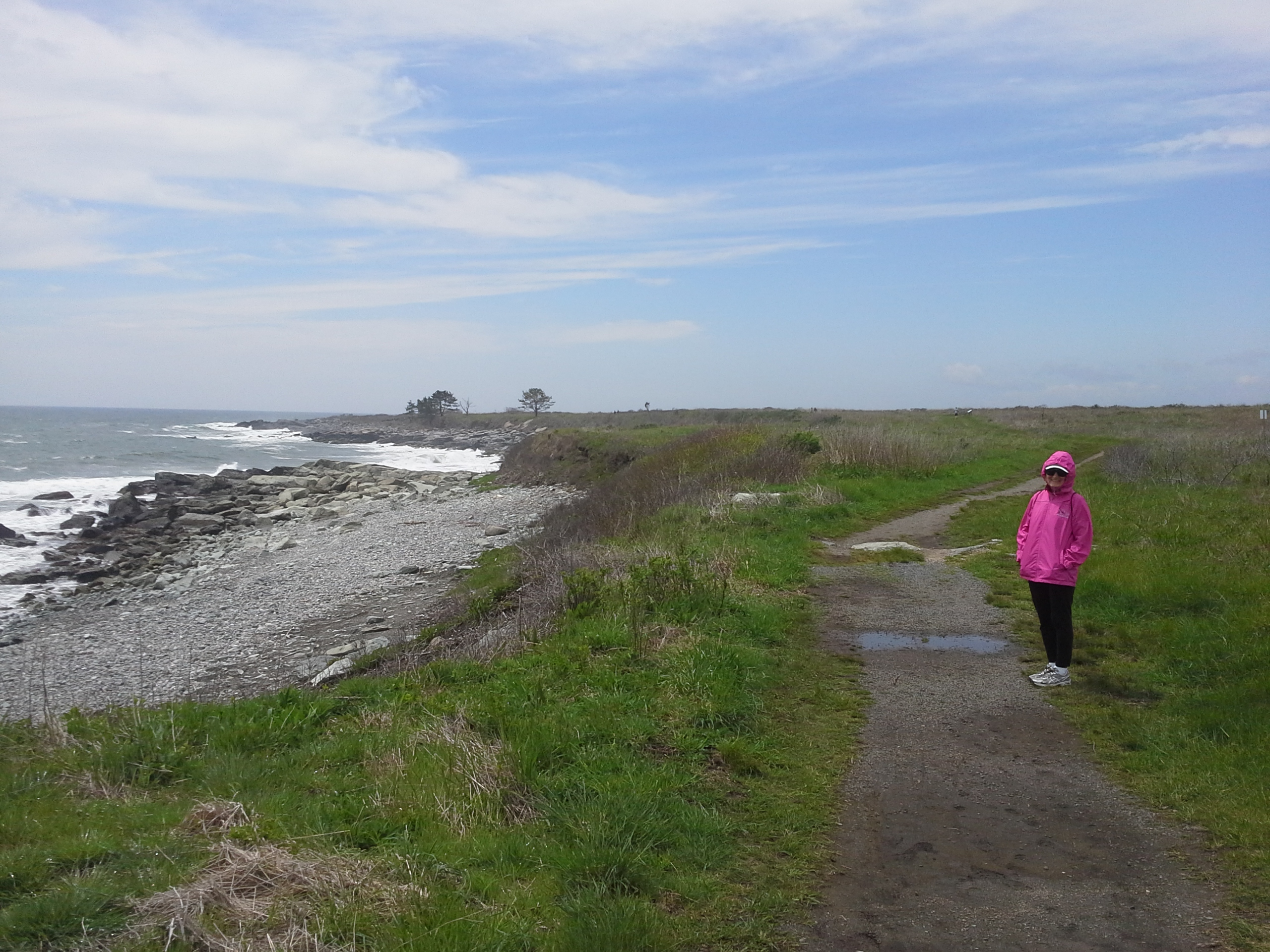
Sachuest Point National Wildlife Refuge in Middletown, Rhode Island

Sachuest Point (SAT-choo-est) is a wildlife refuge in the southeasternmost part of the Town of Middletown, Rhode Island, on a peninsula between the Sakonnet River and Rhode Island Sound, the 242-acre (0.98 km^{2}). It is visited by over 65,000 annual people each year.

The refuge sports a newly renovated visitor center, over 2.5 miles (4.0 km) of nature trails, viewing platforms, and a number of Refuge volunteers present to help visitors and to help in management of the refuge.

Sachuest Point National Wildlife Refuge is renowned for its fantastic saltwater fishing, and the presence of the largest winter population of harlequin ducks on the East Coast.

Once a horse racing area, then a Naval communications site, and now a National Wildlife Refuge, the area is steeped in history.

From salt marsh and beach strand habitats to upland shrub dominated lands, the refuge supports over 200 bird species, with notable occasional visitors such as the peregrine falcon, northern harrier, and the snowy owl.

Sachuest Point, along with the four other National Wildlife Refuges in the State, is administered by the Rhode Island National Wildlife Refuge Complex, headquartered in Charlestown, Rhode Island.

Sachuest Point National Wildlife Refuge was closed following Hurricane Sandy due to damage from the storm. The refuge reopened on May 1, 2013. As of September 2013, the visitor center continues to operate with reduced hours due to the 2013 federal budget sequestration.

== History ==
In 1970, a 70-acre donation from the Audubon Society of Rhode Island led to the establishment of Sachuest Point National Wildlife Refuge. Today, with land transfers from the Navy, the Refuge totals 242 acres that provide an important stopover and wintering area for migratory birds.

Sachuest Point was home to several military facilities in the 20th century. During the US participation in World War I, two 4.7-inch Armstrong guns were transferred from Fort Strong in Boston Harbor to provide some protection against German U-boats. "Sachuest Point" is misspelled in Army records for these guns as "Sauchet Point". The guns were removed in 1919; one was scrapped and one is a memorial in Ansonia, Connecticut. During World War II, the United States Navy established a communications station (NAVRADSTA Sachuest Point, part of NAVCOMMSTA Newport) and a rifle range. The remains of the rifle range still exist. The communications station was closed and demolished in 1973. At some time the United States Army Coast Artillery Corps erected fire control towers on Sachuest Point, probably in World War II to support Fort Church in Little Compton, which guarded the Sakonnet River and the eastern approaches to Narragansett Bay. These were probably abandoned after the war, and were demolished in the late 1970s.

== See also ==
- Norman Bird Sanctuary
