= Clambake Club of Newport =

- U.S. National Register of Historic Places
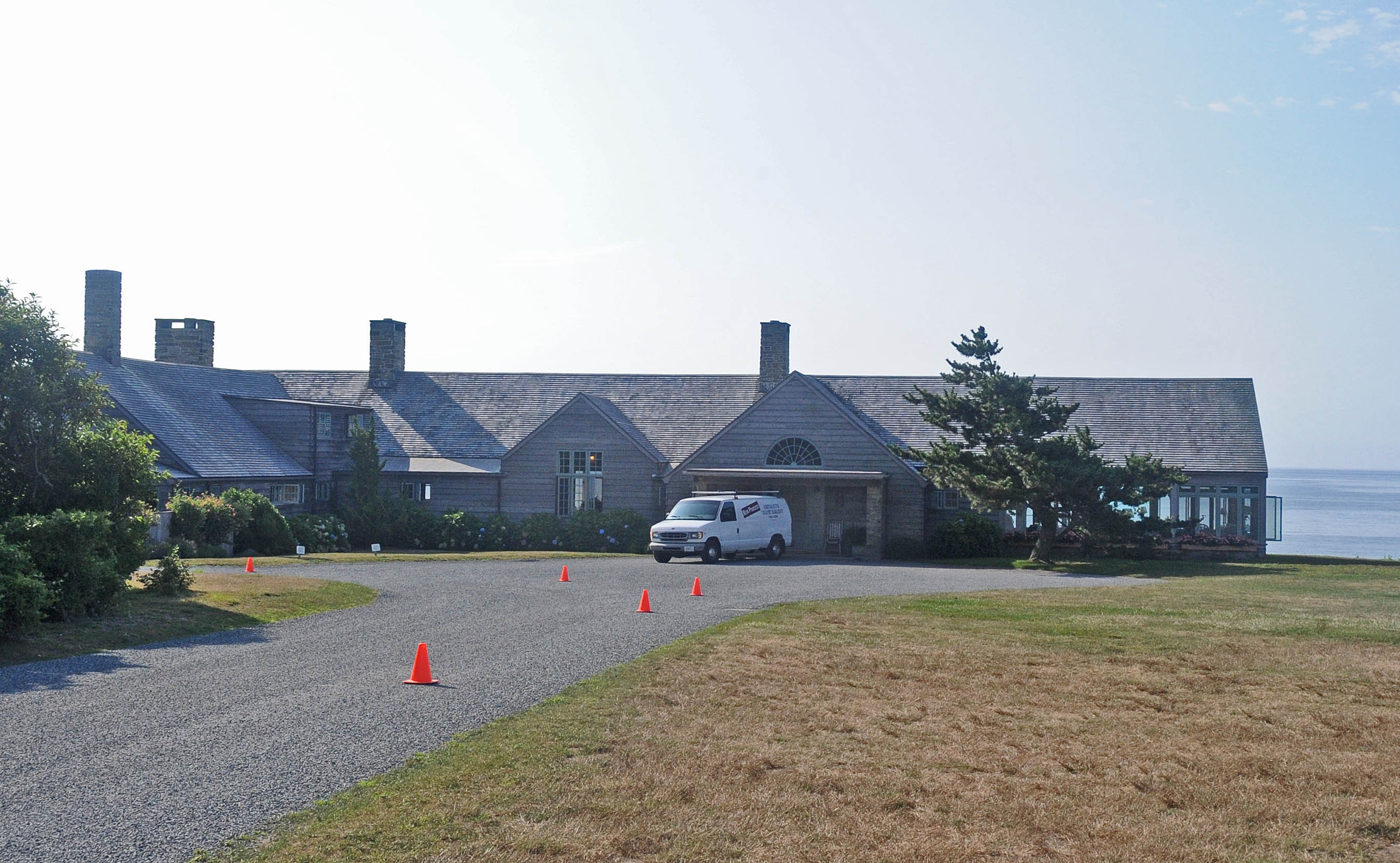

- Location within Rhode Island Location within the United States
- Location: Middletown, Rhode Island
- Coordinates: 41°28′47″N 71°16′32″W
- Area: 4.5 acres (1.8 ha)
- Built: 1907
- Architect: Hoppin, Col. Francis; Van Alen, William L.
- Architectural style: Late 19th And Early 20th Century American Movements
- NRHP reference No.: 95001267
- Added to NRHP: November 7, 1995

The Clambake Club of Newport is a historic private club at 353 Tuckerman Avenue in Middletown, Rhode Island.

== Building ==
The club's main building was listed on the National Register of Historic Places in 1995. It is located at the tip of Easton's Point, dividing Easton Bay and Sachuest Bay on the southern coast of Middletown, with fine views of Newport's mansions. The club, organized in 1895, first leased land at this site, then purchased it in 1903, building its first purpose-built clubhouse c. 1903–07. This building was significantly damaged by the New England Hurricane of 1938. The clubhouse was rebuilt in 1939; club records indicate a design for a substantially new building was prepared by William L. Van Alen.

== Notable Members ==
Notable former members include:

- Oliver Belmont, American congressman
- Perry Belmont, American politician and diplomat
- John Nicholas Brown II, American philanthropist and yachtsman
- Edward H. Bulkeley, American clubman
- William Astor Chanler, American politician, soldier and explorer
- Winthrop Astor Chanler, American sportsman and soldier
- William Bayard Cutting Jr., American diplomat
- Elisha Dyer Jr., American politician
- Edwin St. John Greble, United States Army general
- Theodore Havemeyer, American businessman
- H. H. Hunnewell, American banker
- Woodbury Kane, American yacht racer
- James Powell Kernochan, American businessman and clubman
- David H. King Jr., American gilded age constructor
- Louis Lasher Lorillard, American clubman
- Ogden Mills, American businessman
- Charles May Oelrichs, American broker and clubman
- Herbert Pell, American politician
- R. G. Harper Pennington, American painter
- Lispenard Stewart, American politician
- William Kissam Vanderbilt, American businessman and horse breeder
- Whitney Warren, American architect

== See also ==
- National Register of Historic Places listings in Newport County, Rhode Island
