= Stonybrook Estate Historic District =

Historic house in Rhode Island, United States

- U.S. National Register of Historic Places
- U.S. Historic district
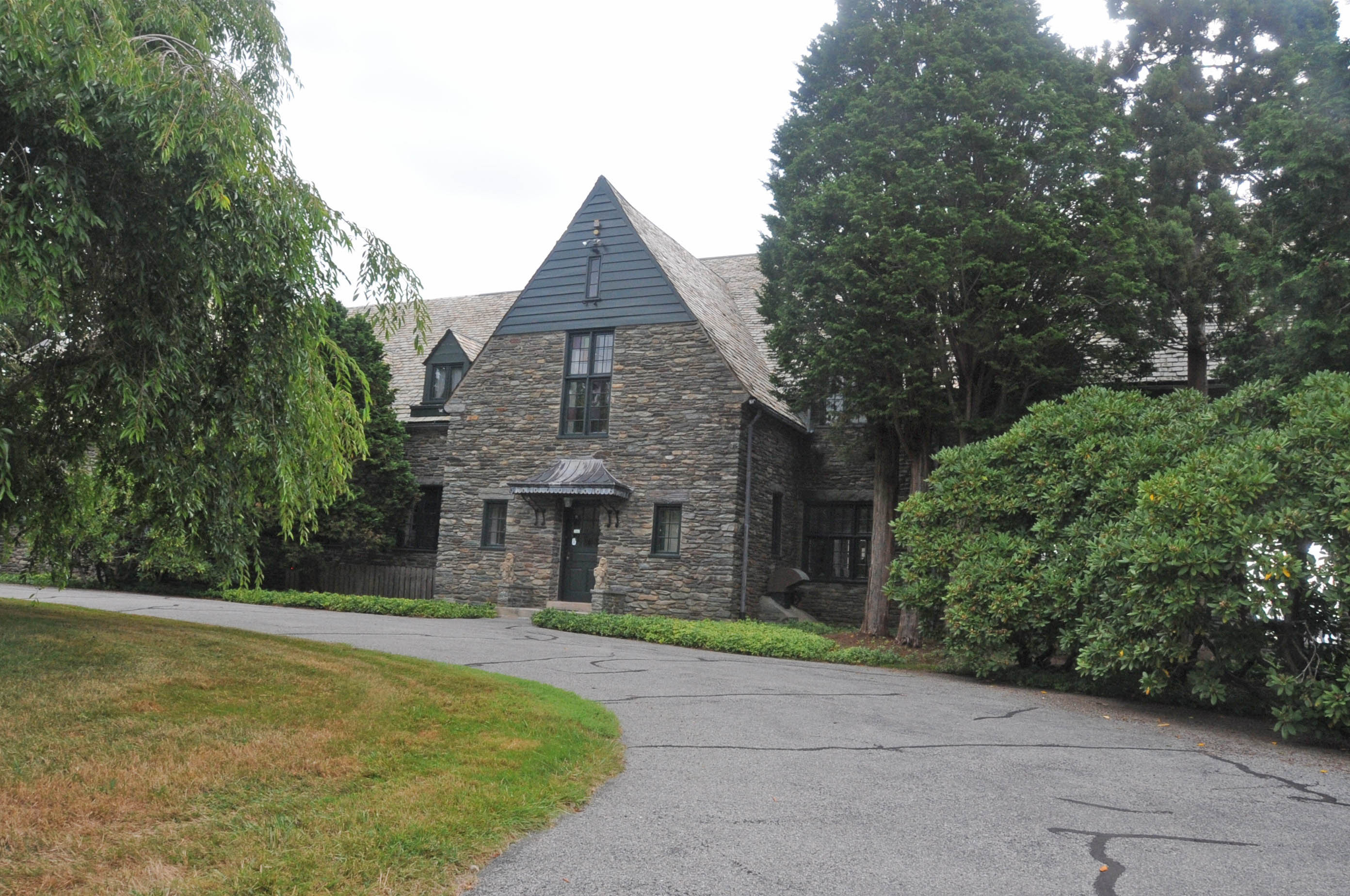

- Location within Rhode Island Location within the United States
- Location: 501-521 Indian Ave. and 75 Vaucluse Ave., Middletown, Rhode Island
- Coordinates: 41°30′24″N 71°14′26″W
- Area: 8.6 acres (3.5 ha)
- Built: 1928
- Architect: Horace Trumbauer
- Architectural style: Late Gothic Revival
- NRHP reference No.: 09000708
- Added to NRHP: September 1, 2009

The Stonybrook Estate Historic District is a historic district at 501-521 Indian Ave. and 75 Vaucluse Avenue in Middletown, Rhode Island. It encompasses what was the largest and most elaborate summer estate built in Middletown, an outgrowth of the expansion of Newport's summer resort community into neighboring towns. The late Gothic Revival main house, built in 1928, was designed by Horace Trumbauer (who also worked on The Elms) for Edward C. Knight, Jr., for whom he had also designed a house on Newport's Bellevue Avenue. The district includes the estate's landscaped grounds, along with a carriage house, several guest cottages, a gate house, and a gardener's cottage (now 75 Vaucluse Avenue).

The district was listed on the National Register of Historic Places in 2009.

== See also ==
- National Register of Historic Places listings in Newport County, Rhode Island
