= Pine Hill Archeological Site, RI-655 =

- U.S. National Register of Historic Places
- Location: Portsmouth, Rhode Island
- NRHP reference No.: 83003803
- Added to NRHP: November 3, 1983

Pine Hill Archeological Site, RI-655 is a prehistoric archaeological site on Prudence Island in Portsmouth, Rhode Island. The site's principal feature is a coastal shell midden dating to the Late Woodland period. Finds at the site include projectile points, stone tools, bones, and ceramics.

The site was listed on the National Register of Historic Places in 1983.

== See also ==
- National Register of Historic Places listings in Newport County, Rhode Island
