= Taylor–Chase–Smythe House =

Historic house in Rhode Island, United States

- U.S. National Register of Historic Places
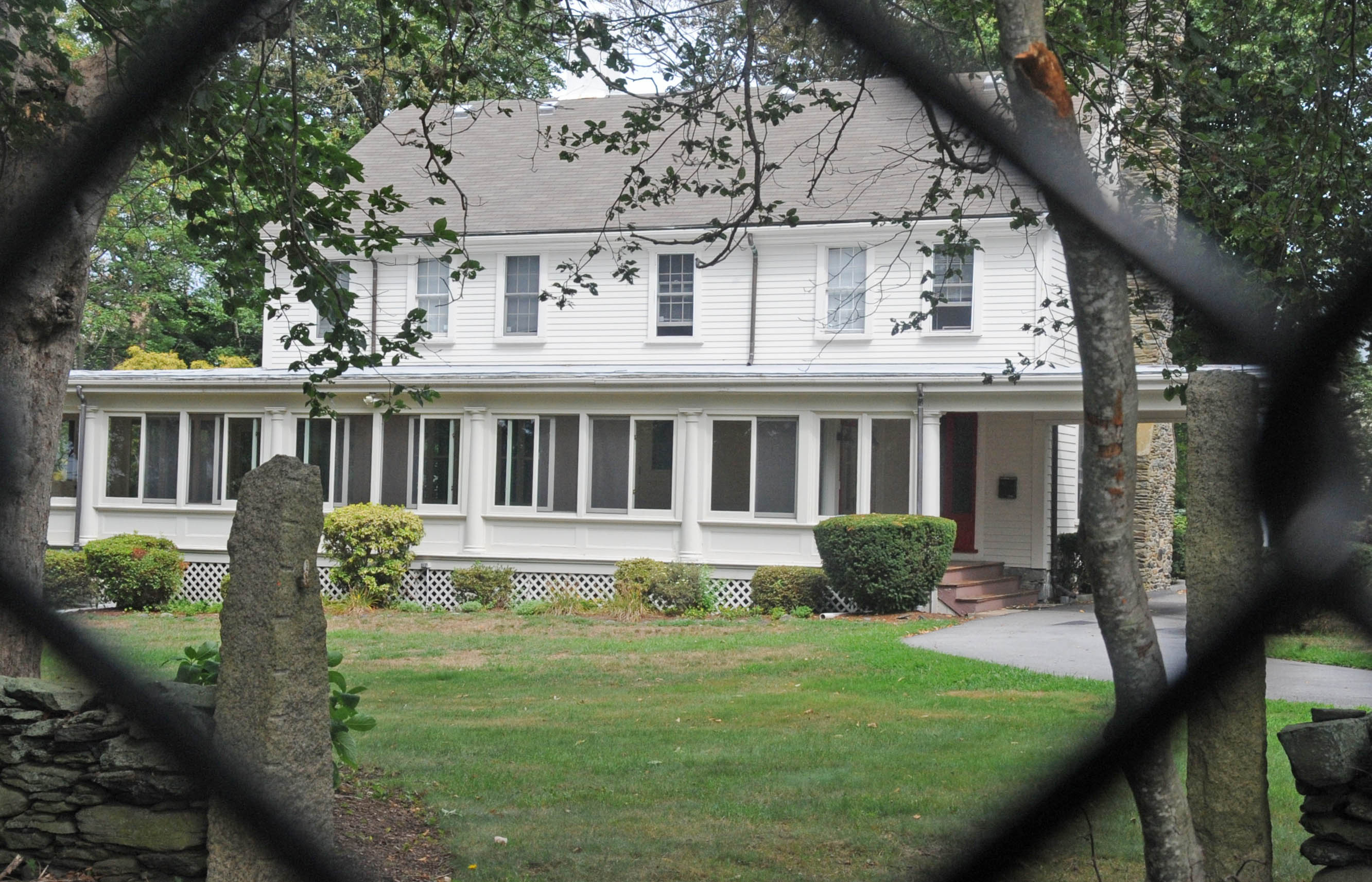
- In 2016

- Location within Rhode Island Location within the United States
- Location: Chase Lane, Middletown, Rhode Island
- Coordinates: 41°31′30″N 71°19′7″W
- Area: less than one acre
- Architectural style: Federal
- NRHP reference No.: 89001220
- Added to NRHP: August 30, 1989

The Taylor–Chase–Smythe House (also known as Quarters NB-1 Chase Lane, Naval Education and Training Center) is a historic house on the Middletown portion of Naval Station Newport (most of which is in Newport, Rhode Island.) It is a two-story wood-frame structure, five bays wide, with a gable roof. A kitchen ell extends to the rear (north) of the house, and a glassed-in porch wraps around two sides of the house, ending in a porte-cochere. The house originally had a large central, chimney, but this was removed during alterations c. 1850. The house was built sometime in the second half of the 18th century by a member of the Chase family. The Chase property was acquired by the United States Navy in 1941, as part of an expansion of its facilities in Newport, and has been used since as military housing.

The house was listed on the National Register of Historic Places in 1989.

== See also ==
- National Register of Historic Places listings in Newport County, Rhode Island
