= Farnham Farm =

Historic house in Rhode Island, United States

- U.S. National Register of Historic Places
- Location within Rhode Island Location within the United States
- Location: Portsmouth, Rhode Island
- Coordinates: 41.59797°N 71.3229°W
- Area: 18.4 acres (7.4 ha)
- Built: 1805
- NRHP reference No.: 05001617
- Added to NRHP: February 2, 2006

The Farnham Farm is historic farm at 113 Mount Pleasant Avenue on Prudence Island in Portsmouth, Rhode Island.

The farm was started by the Dennis family after the original farms on Prudence Island were burned and destroyed by the British during the American Revolution around the time of the Battle of Rhode Island. The farm contains several extant structures including a house (ca. 1805), barn (ca. 1850), milk house, fields, garden, woodland, orchard, and stone walls. The Dennis family sold the house to the Farnhams in 1867. The site was added to the National Register of Historic Places in 2006.

The farm is now owned by the Prudence Conservancy, a local preservation organization.

== See also ==
- National Register of Historic Places listings in Newport County, Rhode Island
