= Bailey Farm =

- U.S. National Register of Historic Places
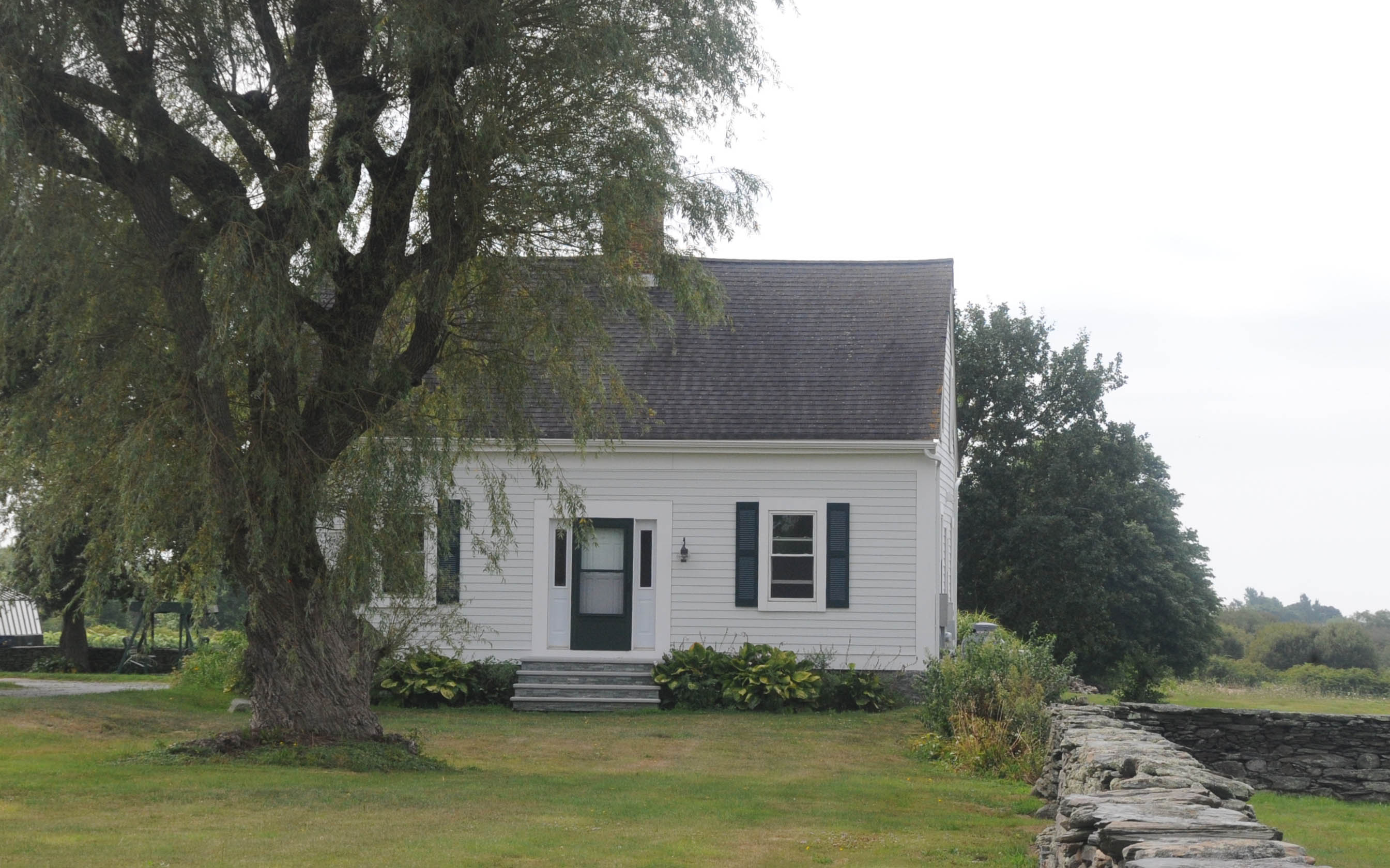
- In 2016

- Location within Rhode Island Location within the United States
- Location: 373 Wyatt Rd., Middletown, Rhode Island
- Coordinates: 41°31′14″N 71°16′9″W
- Area: 45 acres (18 ha)
- Built: 1838; 188 years ago
- Architectural style: Greek Revival
- NRHP reference No.: 84001887
- Added to NRHP: June 4, 1984; 42 years ago

The Bailey Farm is an historic farm at 373 Wyatt Road in Middletown, Rhode Island. Now reduced from more than 100 acres (40 ha) to about 45 acres (18 ha), the farm is a well-preserved example of a 19th-century island farm. It was owned by members of the Bailey family, possibly as early as the late 17th century, into the 19th century. The original main house appears to be a mid-18th-century structure that was given a significant Greek Revival treatment in the 19th century. It is a 1 1/2-story Cape style house, three bays wide, with a central chimney. The main entrance is centered on the northern facade, and is flanked by sidelight windows and pilasters, with an entablature above. The corners of the building are pilastered. A series of outbuildings stand nearby. There is a second complex of buildings on the northwest part of the property, built in the 1930s near the location of the Bailey family cemetery.

The farm was added to the National Register of Historic Places in 1984.

== See also ==
- National Register of Historic Places listings in Newport County, Rhode Island
