= Lyman C. Josephs House =

Historic house in Rhode Island, United States

- U.S. National Register of Historic Places
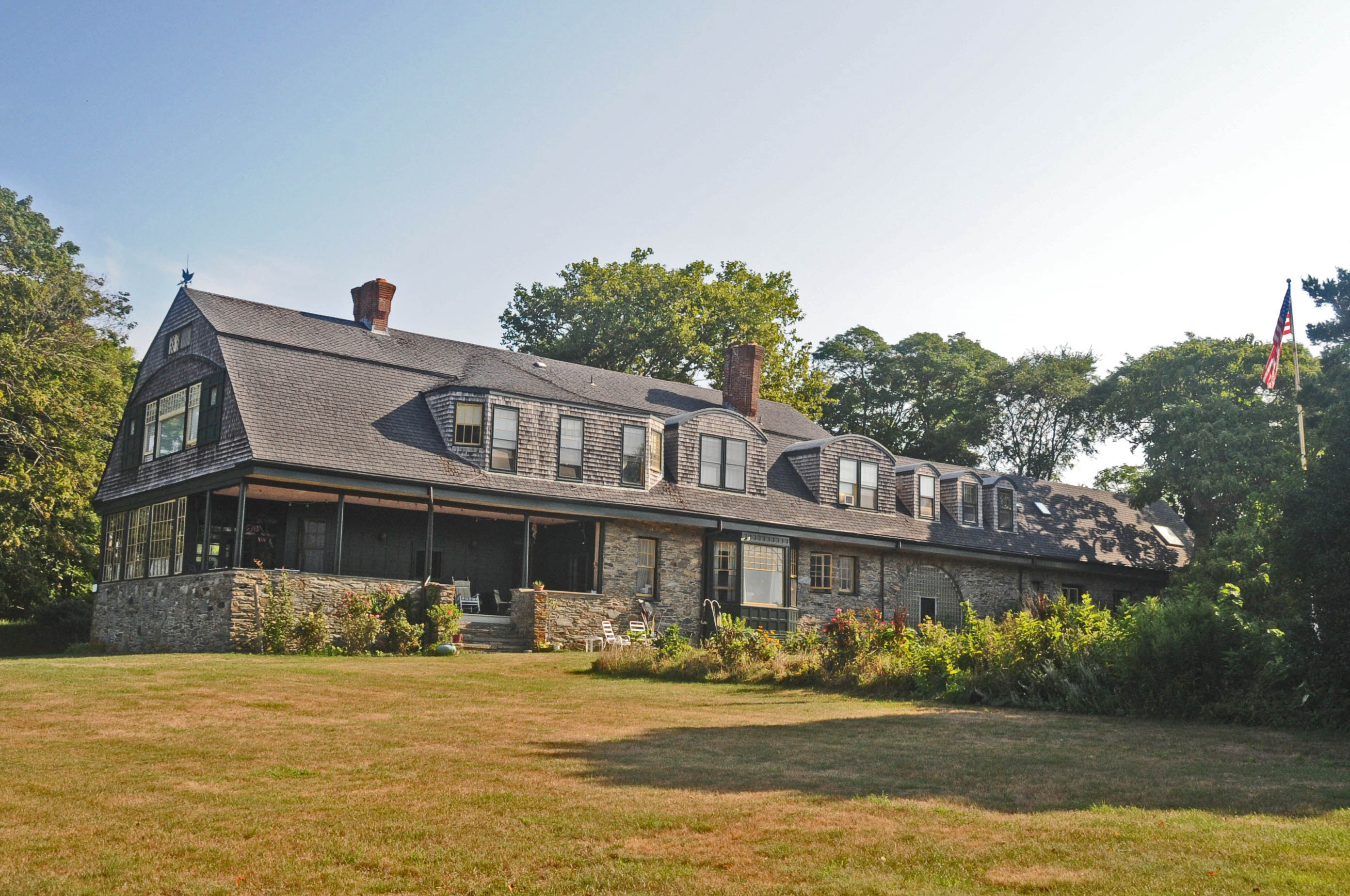

- Location within Rhode Island Location within the United States
- Location: Middletown, Rhode Island
- Coordinates: 41°29′12″N 71°16′34″W
- Built: 1882
- Architect: Luce, Clarence
- Architectural style: Shingle Style
- NRHP reference No.: 75000054
- Added to NRHP: May 2, 1975

The Lyman C. Josephs House, also known as Louisiana, is a historic home at 438 Wolcott Avenue in Middletown, Rhode Island. Architect Clarence Luce designed the house, which was built in 1882, and is a well-preserved early example of the Shingle style. The house received architectural notice not long after its construction, but is more noted for its relatively modest size and lack of ostentation than the summer houses of nearby Newport. It was built for the Josephs family of Baltimore, Maryland.

The house was added to the National Register of Historic Places in 1975.

== See also ==
- National Register of Historic Places listings in Newport County, Rhode Island
