= Borden Farm (Portsmouth, Rhode Island) =

Historic house in Rhode Island, United States

- U.S. National Register of Historic Places
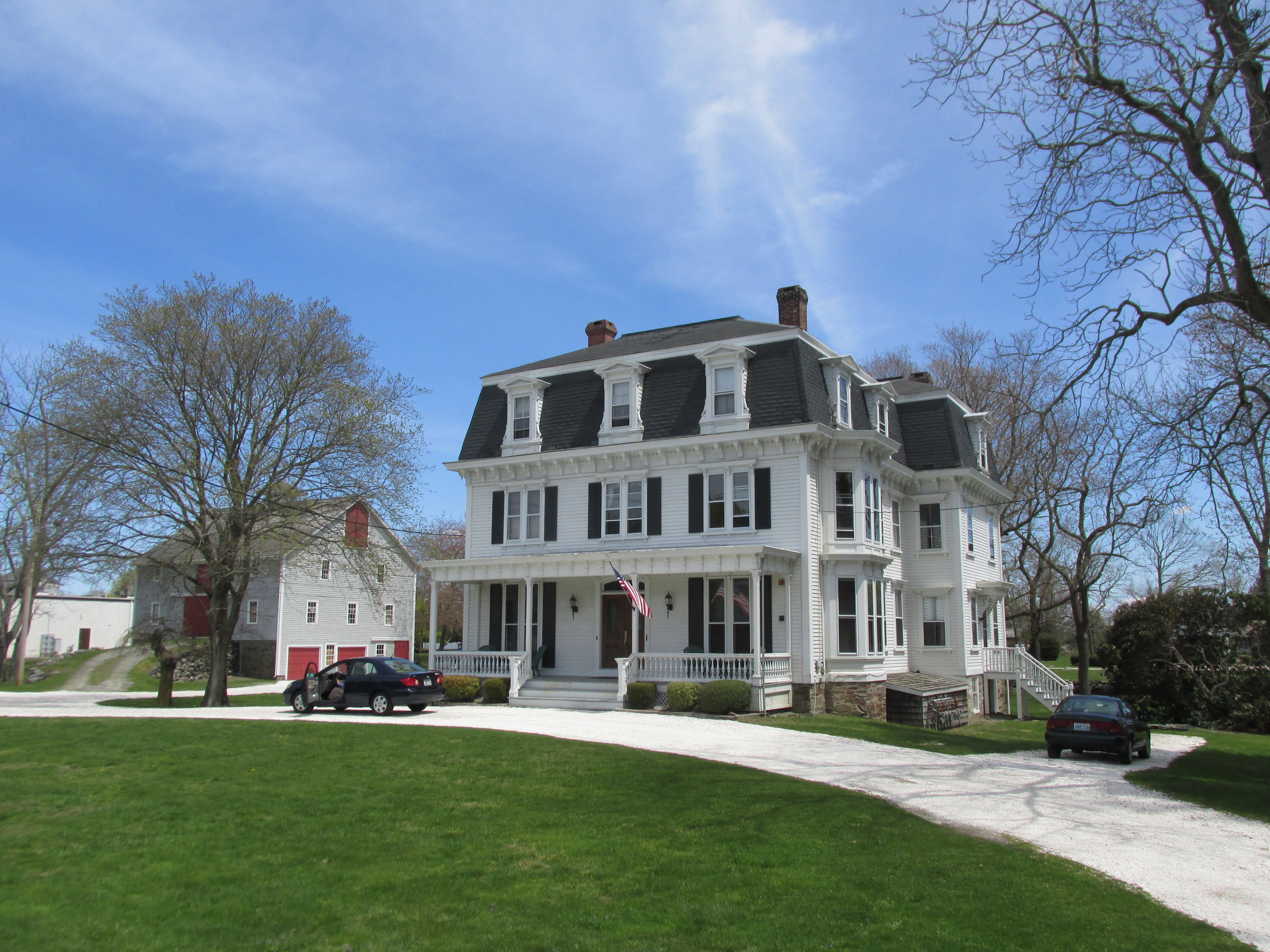
- Borden Farm

- Location within Rhode Island Location within the United States
- Location: 2951 and 2967 E. Main Rd., Portsmouth, Rhode Island
- Coordinates: 41°36′32″N 71°14′45″W
- Area: 6.2 acres (2.5 ha)
- Built: 1865
- Architectural style: Second Empire, Victorian Vernacular
- NRHP reference No.: 07000528
- Added to NRHP: June 05, 2007

Borden Farm is a historic farm at 2951 and 2967 East Main Road in Portsmouth, Rhode Island. There are five historically significant buildings on the 6.2 acres (2.5 ha) that remain of a farm that was once about 44 acres (18 ha). The property has been owned by descendants of the Borden family since the early 1700s. The main house is a c. 1865 Second Empire structure built by William Borden; there is also an English barn dating to about 1890, along with a workshop, granary, and wellhouse all dating to about 1900.

The farm was listed on the National Register of Historic Places in 2007.

== See also ==
- National Register of Historic Places listings in Newport County, Rhode Island
