= Greenvale Farm =

Historic house in Rhode Island, United States

- U.S. National Register of Historic Places
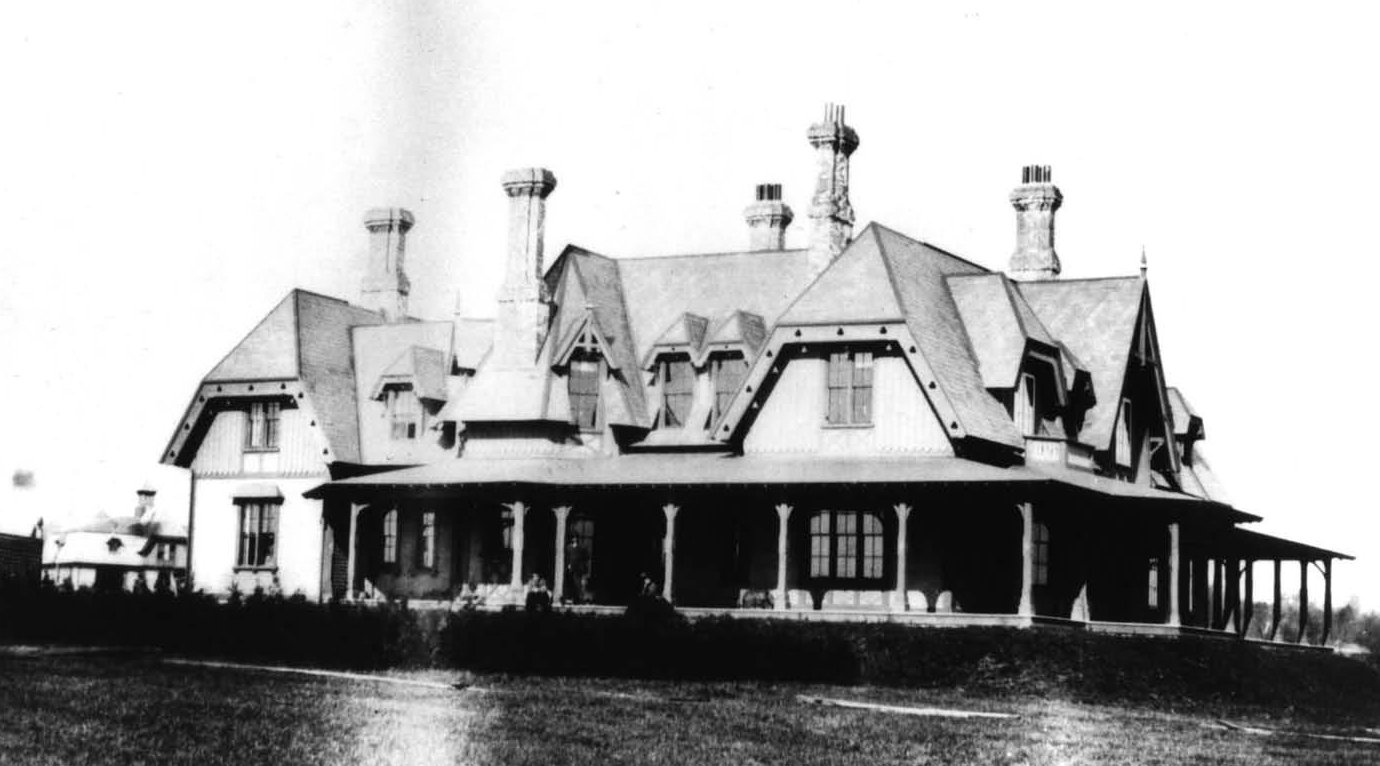
- Photo of the main house, c. 1870

- Location within Rhode Island Location within the United States
- Nearest city: Portsmouth, Rhode Island
- Coordinates: 41.5342°N 71.2372°W
- Area: 53 acres (21 ha)
- Built: 1865
- Architect: Coggeshall, Edmond; Sturgis, John Hubbard
- Architectural style: Stick/Eastlake
- NRHP reference No.: 80000082
- Added to NRHP: January 4, 1980

Greenvale Farm is an historic farm and 19th-century summer estate at 582 Wapping Road in Portsmouth, Rhode Island. Historically used for farmland, a portion of this 53-acre (21 ha) was transformed into an expansive country estate in the 1860s by John Barstow, a Boston merchant. It is located at the end of a narrow dirt lane, and is set overlooking the Sakonnet River. The main house, designed by John Hubbard Sturgis and built in 1864–65, is an exuberant implementation of the Stick style with Gothic features. It has asymmetric form, with a variety of projections, dormers, gables, and cross-gables, with a variety of exterior finishes. The estate continues to be owned by Barstow descendants.

The estate was listed on the National Register of Historic Places in 1980.

== See also ==
- National Register of Historic Places listings in Newport County, Rhode Island
