= Witherbee School =

- U.S. National Register of Historic Places
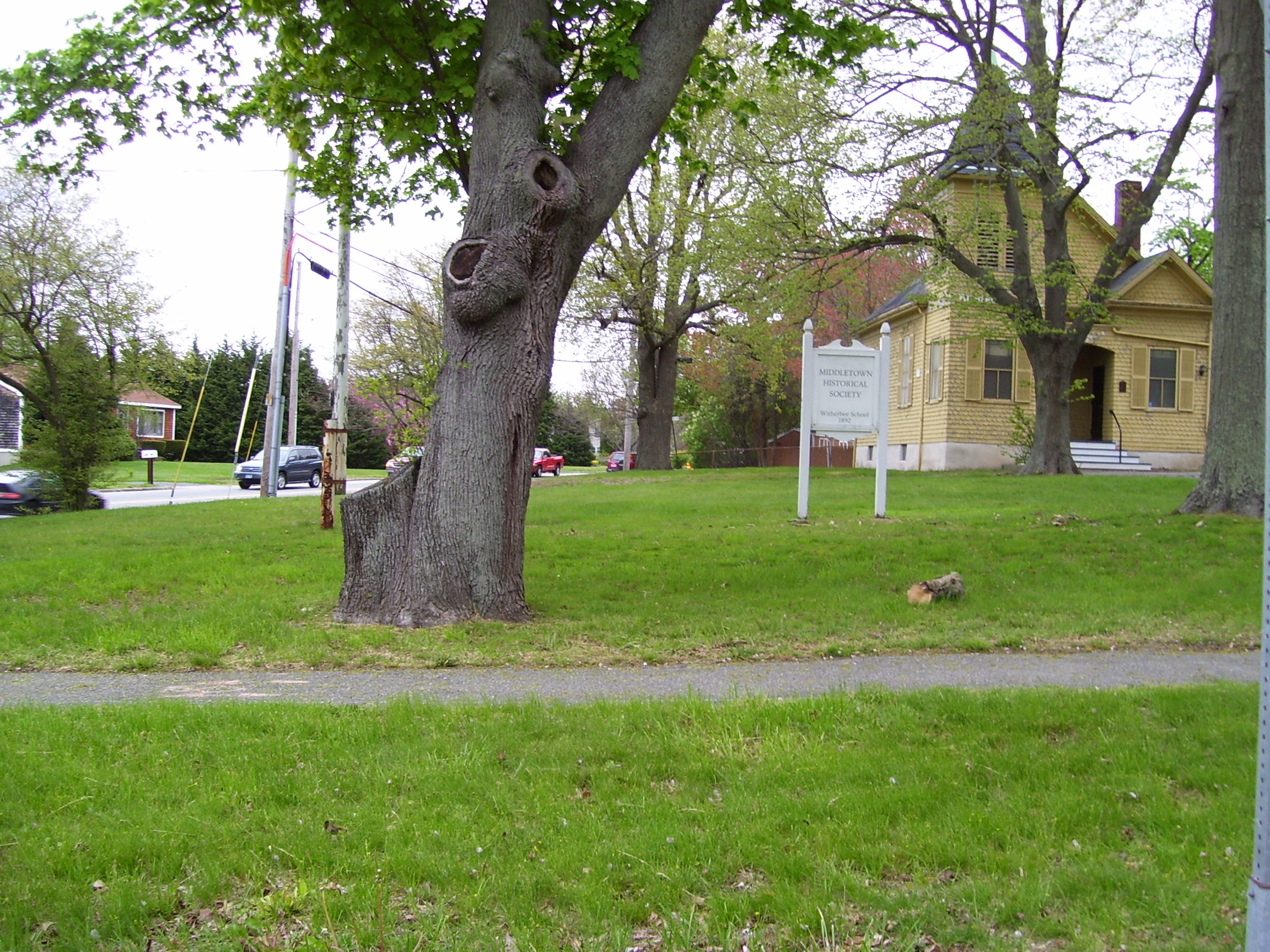
- Location: Middletown, RI
- Coordinates: 41°30′23″N 71°17′21″W
- Built: 1907
- NRHP reference No.: 89002036
- Added to NRHP: 1989

The Witherbee School is a school house on Green End Avenue in Middletown, Rhode Island. It is a small 1 1/2-story gable-roofed structure, with a projecting section topped by a two-story tower. There are two entrances (one each for boys and girls), leading to separate vestibules, which then lead into the single classroom. The vestibule areas were altered to accommodate indoor plumbing facilities sometime before 1940. The school was built in 1907 for the town by John Coggeshall. It closed in the 1940s, and is now run by the Middletown Historical Society as an educational center.

The building was listed on the National Register of Historic Places in 1989.

== See also ==
- National Register of Historic Places listings in Newport County, Rhode Island
- Green's End, Rhode Island
