= Oak Glen (Portsmouth, Rhode Island) =

Historic house in Rhode Island, United States

- U.S. National Register of Historic Places
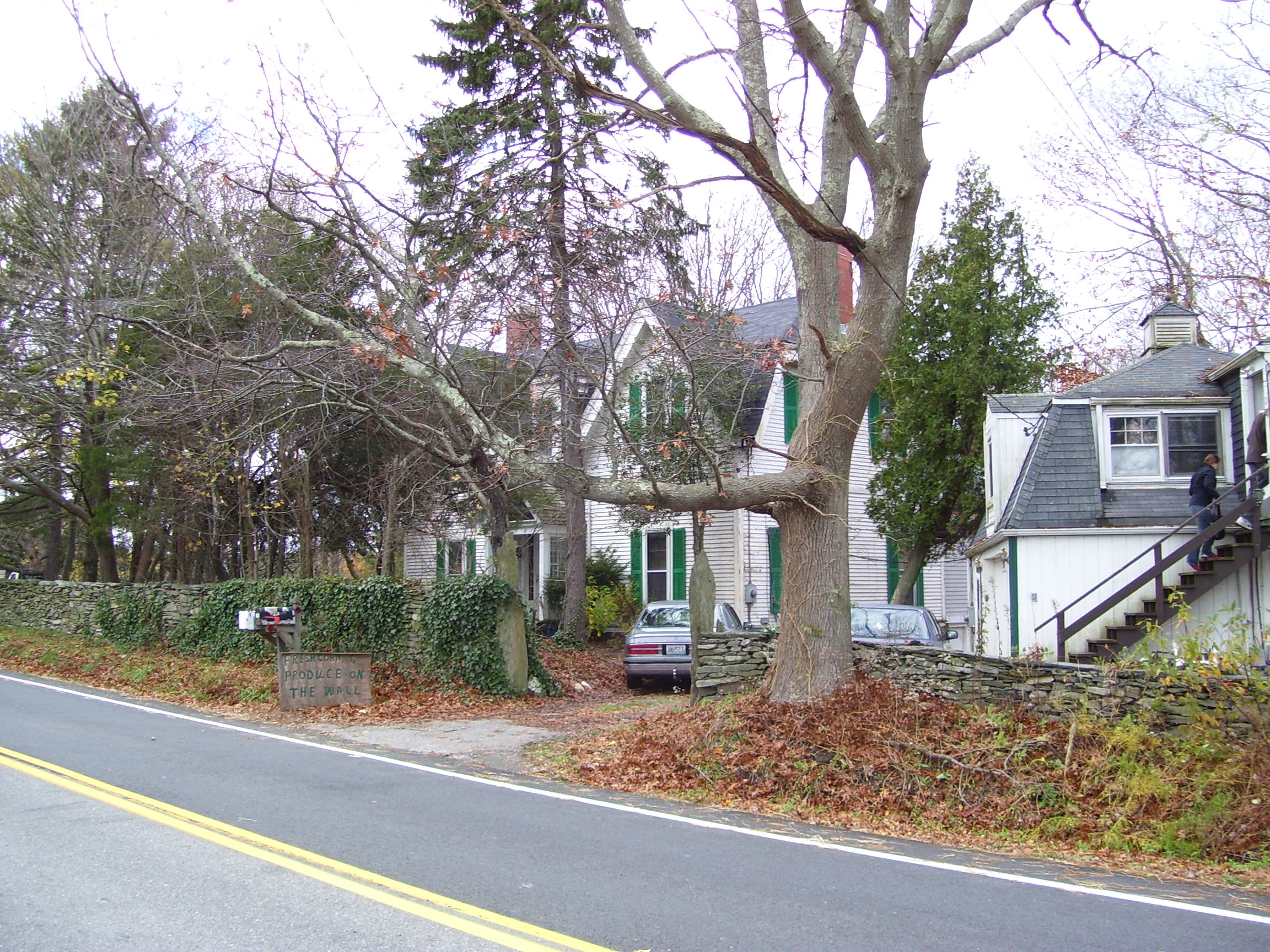
- Oak Glen in 2008

- Location within Rhode Island Location within the United States
- Location: Portsmouth, Rhode Island
- Coordinates: 41°33′33″N 71°16′53″W
- Area: 4.7 acres (1.9 ha)
- NRHP reference No.: 78003444
- Added to NRHP: March 29, 1978

Oak Glen is a historic house at 745 Union Street in Portsmouth, Rhode Island. It is a 2 1/2-story wood-frame structure, with a highly pitched gambrel roof and jerkin-headed (clipped) gable ends. The house was built about 1870 by Samuel and Julia Ward Howe as a summer retreat. The ell attached to the rear of the house is a c. 1850 cottage which was standing on the site when the Howes purchased the property. After Samuel Howe died in 1876, Julia (best known as the author of "The Battle Hymn of the Republic") made this her permanent home. She died here on October 17, 1910, at the age of 91.

The house was listed on the National Register of Historic Places in 1978.

== See also ==
- National Register of Historic Places listings in Newport County, Rhode Island
