= Dennis J. Murphy House at Ogden Farm =

Historic house in Rhode Island, United States

- U.S. National Register of Historic Places
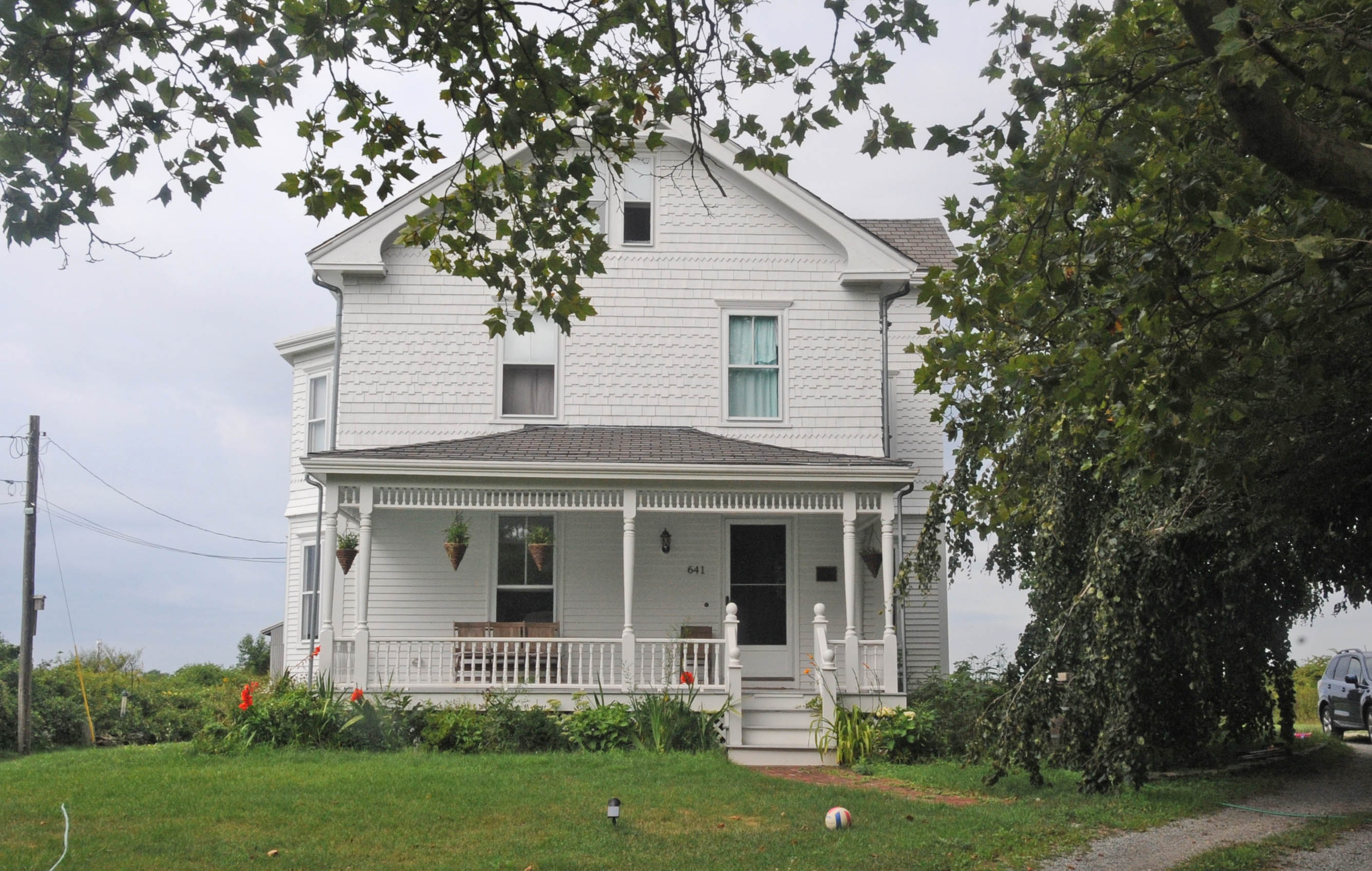
- In 2016

- Location within Rhode Island Location within the United States
- Location: 641 Mitchell's Ln., Middletown, Rhode Island
- Coordinates: 41°31′20″N 71°15′44″W
- Area: 2.3 acres (0.93 ha)
- Built: 1900
- Architectural style: Queen Anne
- NRHP reference No.: 07001269
- Added to NRHP: December 13, 2007

The Dennis J. Murphy House at Ogden Farm is a historic house at 641 Mitchell's Lane in Middletown, Rhode Island. It is a 2 1/2-story wood-frame structure with vernacular Queen Anne styling, built c. 1900 for Dennis J. Murphy, the son of a local farmer. The house has a cross-gable roof line, and its exterior is adorned by decorative bargeboard trim, turned columns on the porches, brackets in the eaves, and other details which typify the Queen Anne period. Its porch was originally more extensive when built, but it was damaged in the New England Hurricane of 1938 and reduced in scope.

The house was listed on the National Register of Historic Places in 2007.

== See also ==
- National Register of Historic Places listings in Newport County, Rhode Island
