= Portsmouth Friends Meetinghouse, Parsonage and Cemetery =

Historic site in Newport County, Rhode Island, US

- U.S. National Register of Historic Places
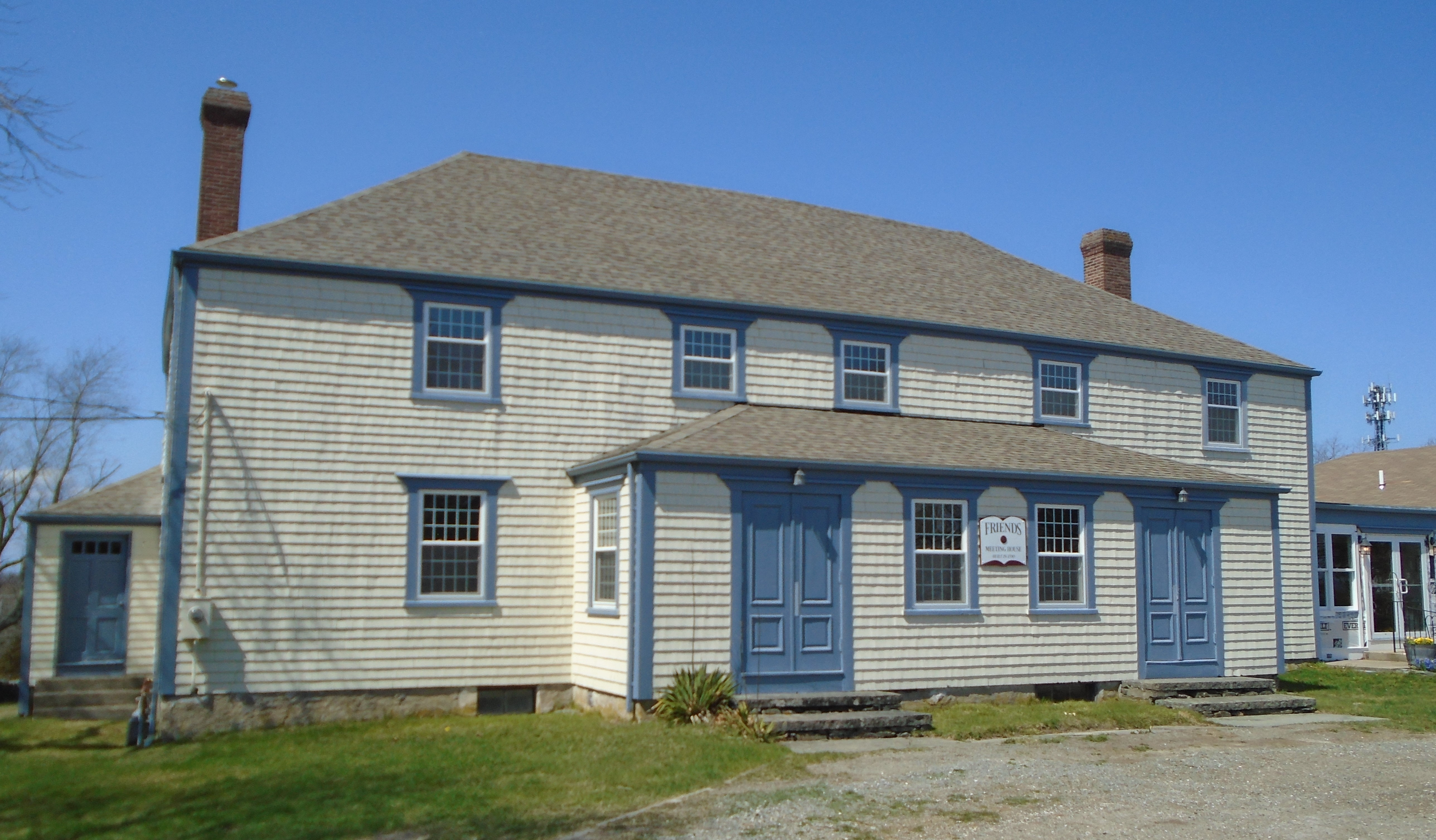
- (2021)

- Location within Rhode Island Location within the United States
- Location: Portsmouth, Rhode Island
- Coordinates: 41°35′28″N 71°15′16″W
- Built: ca. 1699–1700
- NRHP reference No.: 73000053
- Added to NRHP: March 7, 1973

The Portsmouth Friends Meetinghouse, Parsonage, and Cemetery (also known as Portsmouth Friends Meeting House or Portsmouth Evangelical Friends Church) is a historic Friends meeting house and cemetery of the Religious Society of Friends (Quakers), at 11 Middle Road and 2232 E. Main Road in Portsmouth, Rhode Island.

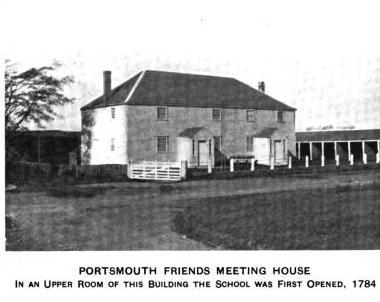
Portsmouth Friends Meeting House in 1919

In 1638, exiled religious dissidents from the Massachusetts Bay Colony founded Portsmouth, the second oldest colonial community in Rhode Island. The Quaker community developed shortly after the community was founded.

The current meetinghouse was built around 1699–1700. The building was used as a Quaker house of worship and school. During the American Revolutionary War, British troops occupied the building. In 1784 the Moses Brown School was founded at the church. The meeting house was added to the National Register of Historic Places in 1973.

The meetinghouse was listed for sale after the Friends' Church regional headquarters closed the church in 2017 in response to dwindling membership. In 2020, the local congregation regained legal control of the meetinghouse and re-opened it for services after renovations.

== See also ==
- List of the oldest buildings in Rhode Island
- Great Friends Meetinghouse
- National Register of Historic Places listings in Newport County, Rhode Island
