= National Register of Historic Places listings in Newport County, Rhode Island =

Location of Newport County in Rhode Island

This is a list of the National Register of Historic Places listings in Newport County, Rhode Island.

This is intended to be a complete list of the properties and districts on the National Register of Historic Places in Newport County, Rhode Island, United States. Latitude and longitude coordinates are provided for many National Register properties and districts; these locations may be seen together in a map.

There are 126 properties and districts listed on the National Register in the county, including 24 National Historic Landmarks.

== Current listings ==
	Name on the Register	Image	Date listed	Location	City or town	Description
1	Army and Navy YMCA	Army and Navy YMCA	December 29, 1988 (#88003073)	50 Washington Sq. 41°29′26″N 71°18′51″W	Newport	
2	Artillery Park	Artillery Park	March 7, 1973 (#73000054)	North Rd. and Narragansett Ave. 41°29′47″N 71°22′29″W	Jamestown	
3	Bailey Farm	Bailey Farm	June 4, 1984 (#84001887)	373 Wyatt Rd. 41°31′14″N 71°16′09″W	Middletown	
4	Charles H. Baldwin House	Charles H. Baldwin House	May 6, 1971 (#71000018)	Bellevue Ave., opposite Perry St. 41°28′44″N 71°18′31″W	Newport	
5	Benjamin Barker House	Benjamin Barker House	October 31, 1980 (#80000081)	1229 Main Rd. 41°38′30″N 71°12′19″W	Tiverton	Destroyed by fire in 1981.
6	Battle of Rhode Island Site	Battle of Rhode Island Site	May 30, 1974 (#74002054)	Lehigh Hill and both sides of RI 24 between Medley and Dexter Sts. 41°36′12″N 71°15′31″W	Portsmouth	Successful defense against British in 1778. Only Revolutionary War battle in which a segregated African-American unit fought (support logistics, 2 killed).
7	Beavertail Light	Beavertail Light	December 12, 1977 (#77000024)	Beavertail Rd. 41°26′58″N 71°23′59″W	Jamestown	Continuously operating gateway to Narragansett Bay since 1749; part of the Lighthouses of Rhode Island Thematic Resource (TR)
8	Isaac Bell House	Isaac Bell House	January 13, 1972 (#72000022)	70 Perry St. 41°28′46″N 71°18′35″W	Newport	First major Shingle-style house
9	Bellevue Avenue Historic District	Bellevue Avenue Historic District	December 8, 1972 (#72000023)	Roughly bounded Atlantic Ocean, Easton Bay, Coggeshall Ave., Spring St., and Memorial Blvd. 41°28′23″N 71°18′28″W	Newport	Home to summer mansions and houses built by wealthy vacationers in Newport in late 19th and early 20th centuries
10	Bellevue Avenue/Casino Historic District	Bellevue Avenue/Casino Historic District	December 8, 1972 (#72000024)	170-230 Bellvue Avenue; 41°28′57″N 71°18′28″W	Newport	
11	The Bird's Nest	The Bird's Nest	June 7, 1982 (#82000130)	526 Broadway at One Mile Corner; 41°30′21″N 71°18′09″W	Newport	
11	John Bliss House	John Bliss House	September 29, 2025 (#100012310)	2 Wilbur Avenue; 41°29′59″N 71°18′08″W	Newport	
12	Borden Farm	Borden Farm	June 5, 2007 (#07000528)	2951 and 2967 E. Main Rd. 41°36′32″N 71°14′45″W	Portsmouth	
13	Bourne Mill	Bourne Mill	December 22, 2006 (#06001189)	844 State Ave. 41°40′12″N 71°10′41″W	Tiverton	Often grouped with the mills of nearby Fall River, Mass., but entirely within Rhode Island
14	Boyd's Windmill	Boyd's Windmill	January 26, 2001 (#01000018)	Prospect Ave. 41°30′03″N 71°16′09″W	Middletown	
15	The Breakers	The Breakers	September 10, 1971 (#71000019)	Ochre Point Ave. 41°28′11″N 71°17′56″W	Newport	Advanced and costly mansion built by Cornelius Vanderbilt II in 1895. Considered the city's premier mansion then and now.
16	Brick Market	Brick Market	October 15, 1966 (#66000019)	Thames St. & Washington Sq. 41°29′23″N 71°18′58″W	Newport	Sophisticated late Georgian building with many classical elements. Now used as Museum of Newport History
17	Thomas Carr Farmstead Site (Keeler Site RI-707)		November 1, 1984 (#84000356)	Address Restricted	Jamestown	
18	Castle Hill Lighthouse	Castle Hill Lighthouse	March 30, 1988 (#88000277)	Off Ocean Ave. on Castle Hill at the western end of Newport Neck; 41°27′43″N 71°21′48″W	Newport	1890 lighthouse still in active use; part of the Lighthouses of Rhode Island TR
19	Chateau-sur-Mer	Chateau-sur-Mer	November 8, 1968 (#68000002)	424 Bellevue Ave. 41°28′10″N 71°18′20″W	Newport	Considered the first of the great Newport mansions.
20	Clambake Club of Newport	Clambake Club of Newport	November 7, 1995 (#95001267)	353 Tuckerman Ave. 41°28′47″N 71°16′32″W	Middletown	
21	Clarke Street Meeting House	Clarke Street Meeting House	January 25, 1971 (#71000020)	Clarke St. 41°29′22″N 71°18′51″W	Newport	
22	Commandant's Residence, Quarters Number One, Fort Adams	Commandant's Residence, Quarters Number One, Fort Adams	May 8, 1974 (#74000043)	Harrison Ave., Fort Adams; 41°28′17″N 71°20′33″W	Newport	
23	Common Burying Ground and Island Cemetery	Common Burying Ground and Island Cemetery	May 1, 1974 (#74000044)	Farwell and Warner Sts. 41°29′50″N 71°18′55″W	Newport	
24	Conanicut Battery		July 2, 1973 (#73000055)	West of Beaver Tail Rd. 41°28′49″N 71°23′38″W	Jamestown	
25	Conanicut Island Lighthouse	Conanicut Island Lighthouse	February 25, 1988 (#87001698)	64 N. Bay View Ave. 41°34′24″N 71°22′21″W	Jamestown	Part of the Lighthouses of Rhode Island TR
26	Cook–Bateman Farm	Cook–Bateman Farm	October 11, 1979 (#79003775)	Fogland, Puncatest Neck (Neck), and Pond Bridge Rds. 41°33′23″N 71°12′07″W	Tiverton	
27	CORONET (Wooden Hull Schooner Yacht)	CORONET (Wooden Hull Schooner Yacht)	June 3, 2004 (#04000571)	449 Thames; 41°28′54″N 71°19′00″W	Newport	
28	Dr. Charles Cotton House	Dr. Charles Cotton House	January 13, 1972 (#72000026)	5 Cotton's Court; 41°29′18″N 71°18′53″W	Newport	
29	William King Covell III	William King Covell III	May 31, 1972 (#72000027)	72 Washington St. 41°29′39″N 71°19′19″W	Newport	
30	Dutch Island Lighthouse	Dutch Island Lighthouse	February 25, 1988 (#87001701)	Southern end of Dutch Island; 41°29′44″N 71°24′16″W	Jamestown	Part of the Lighthouses of Rhode Island TR
31	The Elms	The Elms	September 10, 1971 (#71000021)	Bellevue Ave. 41°28′38″N 71°18′38″W	Newport	One of the last and most modern of the great Newport mansions
32	Emmanuel Church	Emmanuel Church	May 16, 1996 (#96000574)	42 Dearborn St. 41°28′47″N 71°18′47″W	Newport	
33	Farnham Farm		February 2, 2006 (#05001617)	113 Mount Pleasant Ave. 41°35′52″N 71°19′22″W	Portsmouth (Prudence Island)	Now HQ of Prudence Conservancy
34	First Baptist Church of Tiverton	First Baptist Church of Tiverton	July 30, 2013 (#13000569)	7 Old Stone Church Rd. 41°33′42″N 71°08′34″W	Tiverton	Known as the "Old Stone Church"
35	Fort Adams	Fort Adams	July 28, 1970 (#70000014)	West of Newport at Fort Adams Rd. and Harrison Ave. 41°28′30″N 71°20′28″W	Newport	
36	Fort Barton Site	Fort Barton Site	March 7, 1973 (#73000056)	Lawton and Highland Aves. 41°37′47″N 71°12′37″W	Tiverton	
37	Fort Dumpling Site	Fort Dumpling Site	March 16, 1972 (#72000021)	Fort Wetherill; 41°28′38″N 71°21′28″W	Jamestown	Fort Wetherill was built on the site of Fort Dumpling.
38	Fort Hamilton Historic District	Fort Hamilton Historic District	October 22, 2001 (#01001158)	Rose Island; 41°29′47″N 71°20′30″W	Newport	Part of the Lighthouses of Rhode Island TR
39	Friends Meeting House and Cemetery	Friends Meeting House and Cemetery	March 6, 2007 (#07000124)	234 W. Main Rd. 41°31′33″N 71°11′38″W	Little Compton	
40	Friends Meetinghouse	Friends Meetinghouse	March 7, 1973 (#73000276)	North Rd. and Weeden Lane; 41°30′52″N 71°22′31″W	Jamestown	
41	Levi H. Gale House	Levi H. Gale House	May 6, 1971 (#71000022)	89 Touro St. 41°29′21″N 71°18′45″W	Newport	
42	Gardiner Pond Shell Midden	Gardiner Pond Shell Midden	April 12, 1985 (#85000718)	On the grounds of the Norman Bird Sanctuary; 41°29′47″N 71°15′18″W	Middletown	
43	Greenvale Farm	Greenvale Farm	January 4, 1980 (#80000082)	582 Wapping Rd. 41°32′05″N 71°14′18″W	Portsmouth	19th century estate house on the water below Greenvale Vineyard.
44	John Griswold House	John Griswold House	November 5, 1971 (#71000023)	76 Bellevue Ave; 41°29′09″N 71°18′32″W	Newport	
45	Hazard Farmstead (Joyner Site RI-706)		November 1, 1984 (#84000365)	Address Restricted	Jamestown	
46	Joseph Hicks House	Joseph Hicks House	September 10, 1979 (#79000053)	494 Main Rd. 41°39′36″N 71°11′26″W	Tiverton	
47	Hog Island Shoal Lighthouse	Hog Island Shoal Lighthouse	March 30, 1988 (#88000282)	S of Hog Island, E passage, Narrangansett Bay; 41°37′56″N 71°16′25″W	Portsmouth	
48	Hamilton Hoppin House	Hamilton Hoppin House	August 16, 1996 (#96000905)	120 Miantonomi Ave. 41°30′23″N 71°17′52″W	Middletown	
49	Horsehead-Marbella	Horsehead-Marbella	June 16, 1999 (#99000675)	240 Highland Dr. 41°28′34″N 71°22′32″W	Jamestown	
50	Hunter House	Hunter House	November 24, 1968 (#68000003)	54 Washington St. 41°29′33″N 71°19′18″W	Newport	Excellent example of Georgian frame house, with many interior features and original furnishings
51	Ida Lewis Rock Lighthouse	Ida Lewis Rock Lighthouse	February 25, 1988 (#87001700)	On Lime Rock in Newport Harbor off Wellington Ave. 41°28′40″N 71°19′35″W	Newport	Part of the Lighthouses of Rhode Island TR
52	Jamestown Archeological District		December 10, 1989 (#83004869)	Address Restricted	Jamestown	
53	Jamestown Windmill	Jamestown Windmill	March 14, 1973 (#73000057)	North Rd., north of Weeden Lane; 41°30′59″N 71°22′28″W	Jamestown	
54	Lyman C. Josephs House	Lyman C. Josephs House	May 2, 1975 (#75000054)	438 Walcott Ave. 41°29′12″N 71°16′34″W	Middletown	Incorrectly listed as "Lyman C. Joseph House".
55	Kay Street–Catherine Street–Old Beach Road Historic District	Kay Street–Catherine Street–Old Beach Road Historic District	May 22, 1973 (#73000052)	Roughly bounded by Broadway, Memorial Blvd., Whitfield Pl., Champlin & Sherman Sts., Rhode Island, Prairie & Gibbs Ave., 41°29′23″N 71°18′19″W	Newport	Boundary decrease approved March 12, 2018
56	Edward King House	Edward King House	October 15, 1970 (#70000024)	Aquidneck Park, Spring St. 41°28′56″N 71°18′41″W	Newport	Richard Upjohn-designed Italian villa house for local merchant was the largest in the city at time of its 1847 completion.
57	Kingscote	Kingscote	May 17, 1973 (#73000058)	Bellevue Ave. and Bowery St. 41°28′54″N 71°18′34″W	Newport	1839 Gothic Revival house by Richard Upjohn was the first summer residence in Newport.
58	Lawton–Almy–Hall Farm	Lawton–Almy–Hall Farm	October 11, 1978 (#78000068)	559 Union St. 41°33′35″N 71°16′31″W	Portsmouth	
59	Little Compton Common Historic District	Little Compton Common Historic District	May 3, 1974 (#74000041)	Little Compton; 41°30′33″N 71°10′21″W	Little Compton	
60	Lucas–Johnston House	Lucas–Johnston House	May 6, 1971 (#71000024)	40 Division St. 41°29′19″N 71°18′45″W	Newport	
61	Luce Hall	Luce Hall	September 22, 1972 (#72001439)	US Naval War College and Torpedo School, Coasters Harbor Island; 41°30′24″N 71°19′44″W	Newport	
62	Malbone	Malbone	October 22, 1976 (#76000039)	Malbone Rd. 41°30′18″N 71°18′38″W	Newport	
63	Francis Malbone House	Francis Malbone House	April 28, 1975 (#75000055)	392 Thames St. 41°28′58″N 71°18′54″W	Newport	
64	Marble House	Marble House	September 10, 1971 (#71000025)	596 Bellevue Ave. 41°27′44″N 71°18′24″W	Newport	Richard Morris Hunt-designed mansion for William Kissam Vanderbilt
65	Capt. John Mawdsley House	Capt. John Mawdsley House	July 2, 1983 (#83000180)	228 Spring St. 41°29′03″N 71°18′44″W	Newport	
66	Miantonomi Memorial Park	Miantonomi Memorial Park	June 23, 1969 (#69000003)	Between Hillside and Girard Aves. 41°30′32″N 71°18′37″W	Newport	
67	Mount Hope Bridge	Mount Hope Bridge	January 31, 1976 (#76000038)	RI 114 over Narragansett Bay; 41°38′25″N 71°15′32″W	Portsmouth	Longest bridge in New England for over 40 years
68	Dennis J. Murphy House at Ogden Farm	Dennis J. Murphy House at Ogden Farm	December 13, 2007 (#07001269)	641 Mitchell's Ln. 41°31′20″N 71°15′44″W	Middletown	
69	Newport Artillery Company Armory	Newport Artillery Company Armory	June 30, 1972 (#72000029)	23 Clarke St. 41°29′22″N 71°18′51″W	Newport	
70	Newport Casino	Newport Casino	December 2, 1970 (#70000083)	194 Bellevue Ave. 41°28′56″N 71°18′27″W	Newport	Early McKim, Mead and White Shingle Style building; also first social club in U.S. to include recreational facilities. Home to International Tennis Hall of Fame.
71	Newport Harbor Lighthouse	Newport Harbor Lighthouse	March 30, 1988 (#88000276)	N. end of Goat Island, Newport Harbor; 41°29′36″N 71°19′39″W	Newport	Part of the Lighthouses of Rhode Island TR
72	Newport Historic District	Newport Historic District	November 24, 1968 (#68000001)	Bounded roughly by Van Zandt Ave., Newport Harbor, Thames, Pope, William Sts., Bellevue Ave., Bull, Broadway, Kingston; 41°29′21″N 71°18′58″W	Newport	Well-preserved collection of Georgian and colonial buildings, many showing sophistication and coordination
73	Newport Steam Factory	Newport Steam Factory	January 20, 1972 (#72000030)	449 Thames St. 41°29′03″N 71°18′58″W	Newport	
74	Oak Glen	Oak Glen	March 29, 1978 (#78003444)	745 Union St. 41°33′33″N 71°16′53″W	Portsmouth	
75	Ocean Drive Historic District	Ocean Drive Historic District	May 11, 1976 (#76000048)	Ocean Dr. 41°27′40″N 71°20′03″W	Newport	Long road along Newport's southern shore with many summer homes and ocean views
76	Ochre Point–Cliffs Historic District	Ochre Point–Cliffs Historic District	March 18, 1975 (#75000211)	Roughly bounded by Bellevue Ave. and Coastland as far north as Memorial Boulevard and south to Sheep Point Cove; 41°28′27″N 71°18′08″W	Newport	
77	Old State House	Old State House	October 15, 1966 (#66000014)	Washington Sq. 41°29′27″N 71°18′48″W	Newport	Meeting place of colonial and state legislatures until 20th century; intact Georgian public building
78	Old Friends Archeological Site		November 7, 1995 (#95001269)	Address Restricted	Jamestown	
79	Osborn–Bennett Historic District	Osborn–Bennett Historic District	December 22, 2005 (#05001460)	1137, 1148, 1168, 1188 Main Rd. 41°38′35″N 71°11′55″W	Tiverton	
80	Paradise School	Paradise School	May 5, 1978 (#78000069)	Paradise and Prospect Aves. 41°30′06″N 71°16′08″W	Middletown	
81	Perry Mill	Perry Mill	January 13, 1972 (#72000020)	337 Thames St. 41°29′02″N 71°18′55″W	Newport	
82	Pine Hill Archeological Site, RI-655		November 3, 1983 (#83003803)	Address Restricted	Portsmouth	
83	Portsmouth Friends Meetinghouse Parsonage and Cemetery	Portsmouth Friends Meetinghouse Parsonage and Cemetery	March 7, 1973 (#73000053)	11 Middle Rd. and 2232 E. Main Rd. 41°35′27″N 71°15′14″W	Portsmouth	
84	President's House, Naval War College	President's House, Naval War College	September 18, 1989 (#89001219)	Naval Education and Training Center on Coasters Harbor Island; 41°30′28″N 71°19′40″W	Newport	
85	Prudence Island Lighthouse	Prudence Island Lighthouse	March 30, 1988 (#88000270)	Eastern end of Sandy Pt. on Prudence Island; 41°36′20″N 71°18′11″W	Portsmouth	Part of the Lighthouses of Rhode Island TR
86	Redwood Library	Redwood Library	October 15, 1966 (#66000015)	50 Bellevue Ave. 41°29′12″N 71°18′34″W	Newport	
87	Rhode Island Red	Rhode Island Red	October 19, 2001 (#01000465)	Junction of Adamsville, Westport Harbor, Main and Stone Church Rds. 41°33′13″N 71°07′44″W	Little Compton	Part of the Outdoor Sculpture of Rhode Island Multiple Property Submission (MPS)
88	Joseph Rogers House	Joseph Rogers House	February 23, 1972 (#72000031)	37 Touro St. 41°29′23″N 71°18′51″W	Newport	
89	Rose Island Lighthouse	Rose Island Lighthouse	April 10, 1987 (#87000033)	Southwestern point of Rose Island; 41°29′44″N 71°20′35″W	Newport	Part of the Lighthouses of Rhode Island TR
90	Rosecliff	Rosecliff	February 6, 1973 (#73000059)	Bellevue Ave. 41°27′55″N 71°18′20″W	Newport	
91	St. Mary's Episcopal Church		March 24, 2023 (#100008600)	324 East Main Rd. 41°32′48″N 71°15′41″W	Portsmouth	
92	Sakonnet Light Station	Sakonnet Light Station	February 10, 1983 (#83000179)	South of Little Compton on Little Cormorant Rock; 41°27′11″N 71°12′11″W	Little Compton	Part of the Lighthouses of Rhode Island TR
93	Seamen's Church Institute of Newport	Seamen's Church Institute of Newport	August 4, 1983 (#83000178)	18 Market Square; 41°29′14″N 71°19′01″W	Newport	
94	William Watts Sherman House	William Watts Sherman House	December 30, 1970 (#70000015)	2 Shepard Ave. 41°28′12″N 71°18′18″W	Newport	
95	Shiloh Church	Shiloh Church	August 12, 1971 (#71000026)	25 School St. 41°29′19″N 71°18′44″W	Newport	
96	Shoreby Hill Historic District	Shoreby Hill Historic District	September 15, 2011 (#11000674)	Roughly bounded by Whittier Rd., Prudence Ln., Emerson Rd., Conanicus Ave., Knowles Ct., Coronado St. & Longfellow Rd. 41°29′57″N 71°22′08″W	Jamestown	
97	Smith–Gardiner–Norman Farm Historic District	Smith–Gardiner–Norman Farm Historic District	June 16, 2008 (#08000234)	583 Third Beach Rd. 41°29′58″N 71°15′00″W	Middletown	Centerpiece of the Norman Bird Sanctuary.
98	Southern Thames Historic District	Southern Thames Historic District	June 26, 2008 (#08000314)	Thames St. from Memorial Blvd. to Morton Ave. 41°29′09″N 71°18′53″W	Newport	
99	St. Columba's, the Berkeley Memorial Chapel		August 1, 2022 (#100007963)	55 Vaucluse Ave. 41°30′25″N 71°14′32″W	Middletown	
100	St. George's School–Church of St. George, Little Chapel, and Memorial Schoolhouse	St. George's School–Church of St. George, Little Chapel, and Memorial Schoolhouse	November 12, 2004 (#04001235)	372 Purgatory Rd. 41°29′27″N 71°16′06″W	Middletown	
101	St. Mary's Church Complex	St. Mary's Church Complex	March 6, 2008 (#08000153)	14 William St. 41°29′02″N 71°18′45″W	Newport	
102	Ezra Stiles House	Ezra Stiles House	March 16, 1972 (#72000116)	14 Clarke St. 41°29′23″N 71°18′50″W	Newport	
103	Stone House Inn	Stone House Inn	April 2, 2008 (#08000255)	122 Sakonnet Rd. 41°27′58″N 71°11′11″W	Little Compton	
104	Stonybrook Estate Historic District	Stonybrook Estate Historic District	September 1, 2009 (#09000708)	501-521 Indian Ave. and 75 Vaucluse Ave. 41°30′23″N 71°14′31″W	Middletown	
105	Taylor–Chase–Smythe House	Taylor–Chase–Smythe House	August 30, 1989 (#89001220)	Chase Ln., Naval Education and Training Center; 41°31′30″N 71°19′07″W	Middletown	
106	Charles Tillinghast House	Charles Tillinghast House	January 20, 1972 (#72001576)	243-245 Thames St. 41°29′19″N 71°18′54″W	Newport	Demolished c. 1973
107	John Tillinghast House	John Tillinghast House	April 11, 1973 (#73000060)	142 Mill St. 41°29′11″N 71°18′37″W	Newport	
108	Tiverton Four Corners Historic District	Tiverton Four Corners Historic District	June 20, 1974 (#74000042)	Roughly bounded by Main, West (Neck) and East Rds. 41°34′17″N 71°11′18″W	Tiverton	16 properties, including Soule-Seabury Mansion (pictured), Amicable Congregational Church, Bateman-Tripp Wheelwright Shop, Chace-Corey House, Pardon Cory House, Davenport House, King Cottage, Arnold Smith House, A. J. White Store, and Wilcox-Davol House
109	Touro Synagogue National Historic Site	Touro Synagogue National Historic Site	October 15, 1966 (#66000927)	85 Touro St. 41°29′23″N 71°18′45″W	Newport	Only surviving synagogue from colonial era
110	Trinity Church	Trinity Church	November 24, 1968 (#68000004)	Spring and Church Sts. 41°29′15″N 71°18′50″W	Newport	Oldest parish church in Rhode Island; early 18th-century design modeled on Boston's Old North Church
111	Union Church	Union Church	June 13, 1974 (#74000045)	870 E. Main Rd. at Union St. 41°33′30″N 71°15′22″W	Portsmouth	
112	United Congregational Church	United Congregational Church	November 19, 1971 (#71000027)	Spring and Pelham Sts. 41°29′09″N 71°18′49″W	Newport	National Historic Landmark designation October 16, 2012
113	US Naval War College	US Naval War College	October 15, 1966 (#66000876)	Coaster's Harbor Island; 41°30′24″N 71°19′44″W	Newport	
114	Alexander Van Rensselaer House		June 4, 2018 (#100002524)	1 Ichabod Ln. 41°30′23″N 71°17′47″W	Middletown	
115	Vernon House	Vernon House	November 24, 1968 (#68000005)	46 Clarke St. 41°29′19″N 71°18′50″W	Newport	Sophisticated Georgian frame house used as headquarters by Rochambeau after end of British occupation during Revolutionary War
116	Wanton–Lyman–Hazard House	Wanton–Lyman–Hazard House	October 15, 1966 (#66000016)	17 Broadway; 41°29′27″N 71°18′48″W	Newport	Oldest house in Newport, built in 1697.
117	Weatherly (sloop)		August 28, 2012 (#12000585)	49 America's Cup Blvd. 41°29′15″N 71°18′59″W	Newport	
118	William Whalley Homestead	William Whalley Homestead	August 3, 1988 (#88001127)	33 Burchard Ave. 41°32′37″N 71°10′09″W	Little Compton	
119	White Horse Tavern	White Horse Tavern	February 23, 1972 (#72000032)	26 Marlborough St. 41°29′30″N 71°18′51″W	Newport	One of the oldest tavern buildings in the U.S., built in 1673
120	Whitehall	Whitehall	April 28, 1970 (#70000016)	Berkeley Ave. 41°30′50″N 71°16′20″W	Middletown	
121	Samuel Whitehorne House	Samuel Whitehorne House	May 6, 1971 (#71000028)	414 Thames St. 41°28′55″N 71°18′53″W	Newport	
122	Wilbor House	Wilbor House	March 6, 2007 (#07000125)	548 W. Main Rd. 41°29′43″N 71°11′11″W	Little Compton	
123	Windmill Hill Historic District	Windmill Hill Historic District	October 2, 1978 (#78000067)	Eldred Ave. and N. Main Rd. 41°31′04″N 71°22′44″W	Jamestown	
124	Witherbee School	Witherbee School	November 27, 1989 (#89002036)	Green End Ave. 41°30′23″N 71°17′21″W	Middletown	Part of the Middletown MPS
125	Wreck Sites of H.M.S. Cerberus and H.M.S. Lark	Wreck Sites of H.M.S. Cerberus and H.M.S. Lark	April 26, 1973 (#73000061)	Waters of Narragansett Bay adjacent to Aquidneck Island; 41°35′04″N 71°18′19″W	South Portsmouth	

== Former listings ==
	Name on the Register	Image	Date listed	Date removed	Location	City or town	Description
1	Building at 295 Thames Street		February 23, 1972 (#72001578)	Unknown	295 Thames St.	Newport	Demolished for construction of America's Cup Ave.
2	Building at 319 Thames Street (rear)		February 1, 1972 (#72001573)	Unknown	319 Thames St. (rear)	Newport	Demolished for construction of America's Cup Ave.
3	Sherman Clark House		January 13, 1972 (#72000025)	Unknown	279 Thames St.	Newport	Destroyed by arsonist on July 29, 1972.
4	Clark Cook House	Clark Cook House	January 13, 1972 (#72001571)	October 24, 1975	285 Thames St.	Newport	Relocated in 1973 to Bannister's Wharf to allow construction of America's Cup Ave.
5	Industrial National Bank	Industrial National Bank	November 23, 1971 (#71001087)	Unknown	303 Thames St.	Newport	Demolished for construction of America's Cup Ave.
6	Jacob Mott House		April 24, 1973 (#73002264)	Unknown	S of Cory's Lane on W. Main Rd.	Portsmouth	Dismantled and relocated in 1973.
7	Sayer Building		February 1, 1972 (#72001574)	Unknown	281-283 Thames St.	Newport	Demolished for construction of America's Cup Ave.
8	Robert Stevens House	Robert Stevens House	November 5, 1971 (#71001088)	Unknown	261-265 Thames St.	Newport	Destroyed by arsonist on November 1, 1972.

== See also ==
- List of National Historic Landmarks in Rhode Island
- National Register of Historic Places listings in Rhode Island
This National Park Service list is complete through NPS recent listings posted July 10, 2026.
