= Norman Bird Sanctuary =

Nature preserve in Middletown, Rhode Island, US

- Smith–Gardiner–Norman Farm Historic District
- U.S. National Register of Historic Places
- U.S. Historic district
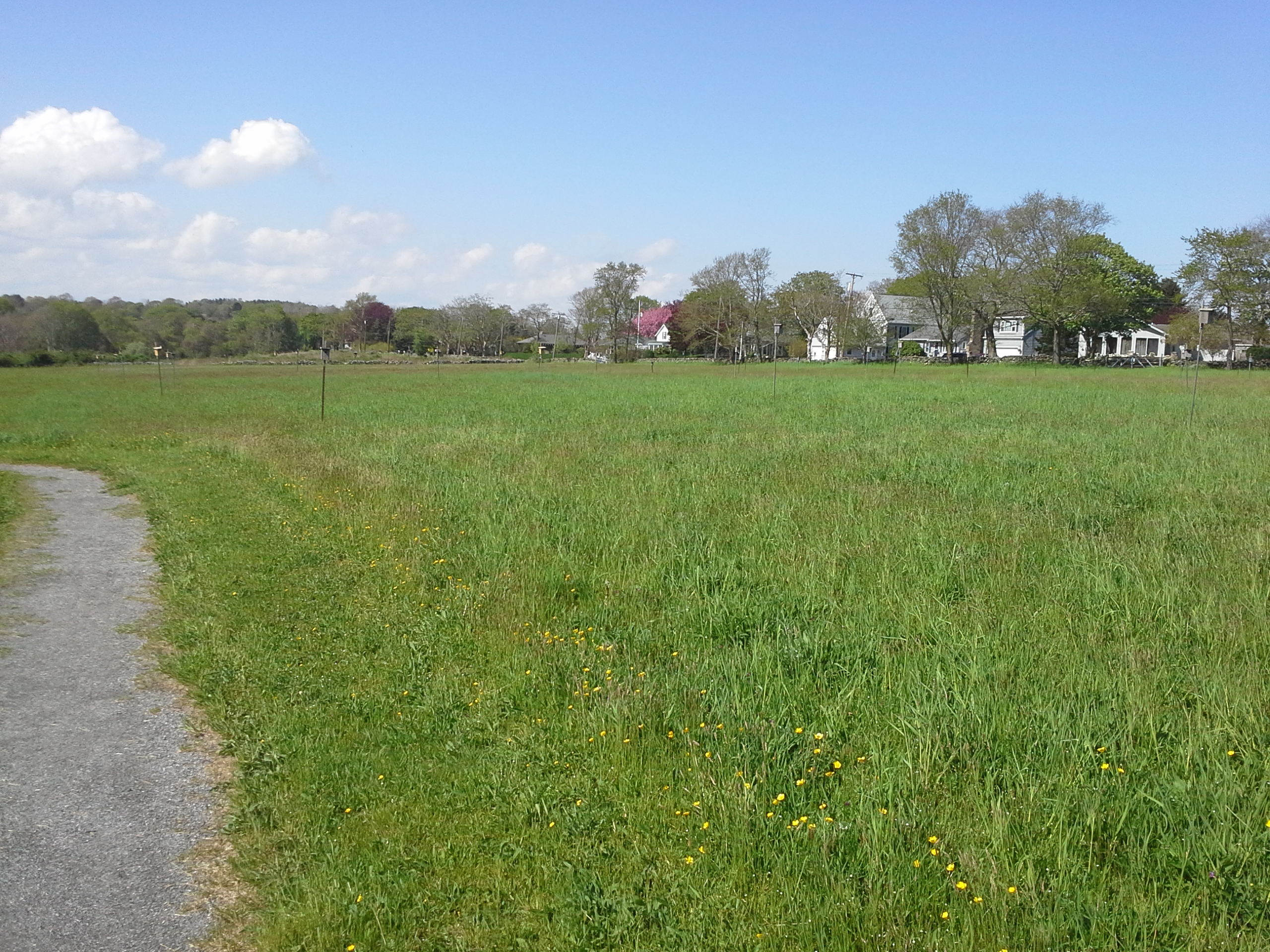

- Location within Rhode Island Location within the United States
- Location: 583 Third Beach Rd., Middletown, Rhode Island
- Coordinates: 41°29′58.2″N 71°15′3.5″W
- Area: 129 acres (52 ha)
- Built: 1750
- Architect: Clarke and Howe
- Architectural style: Federal, Colonial Revival
- NRHP reference No.: 08000234
- Added to NRHP: June 16, 2008

Norman Bird Sanctuary is a 325-acre (1.32 km^{2}) bird sanctuary, nature preserve, environmental education center, and museum at 583 Third Beach Road in Middletown, Rhode Island overlooking the Atlantic Ocean.

In 1949, the Norman Bird Sanctuary was founded through a bequest in the will of Mabel Norman Cerio. The Sanctuary comprises the largest area of preserved open space in Newport County. There are 325 acres and 7 miles of hiking trails. The refuge contains hay fields, woodlands and ridges overlooking the ocean and ponds. Hanging Rock, a prominent local landmark, is located within the sanctuary overlooking the ocean. There is also a Visitor Center and gift shop, and a 19th-century barn museum featuring displays about the wildlife for children and adults.

== History ==
The property of the Norman Bird Sanctuary has an agricultural history dating to the early 18th century, when a large tract of land was purchased by Isaac Smith, a descendant of one of the area's first settlers. The main farmhouse on the property is a typical Colonial-era farmhouse, five bays wide with a large central chimney, and dates to about 1755. The property, then 200 acres (81 ha), was auctioned to pay debts in 1782; the purchaser was Benjamin Gardiner. In 1898 George Norman, a Newport businessman, purchased the farm, then reduced to about 129 acres (52 ha), and it was his daughter Mabel who modernized the house and gave it a more Colonial Revival appearance. This core portion of the sanctuary was listed on the National Register of Historic Places in 2008.

== Gallery ==
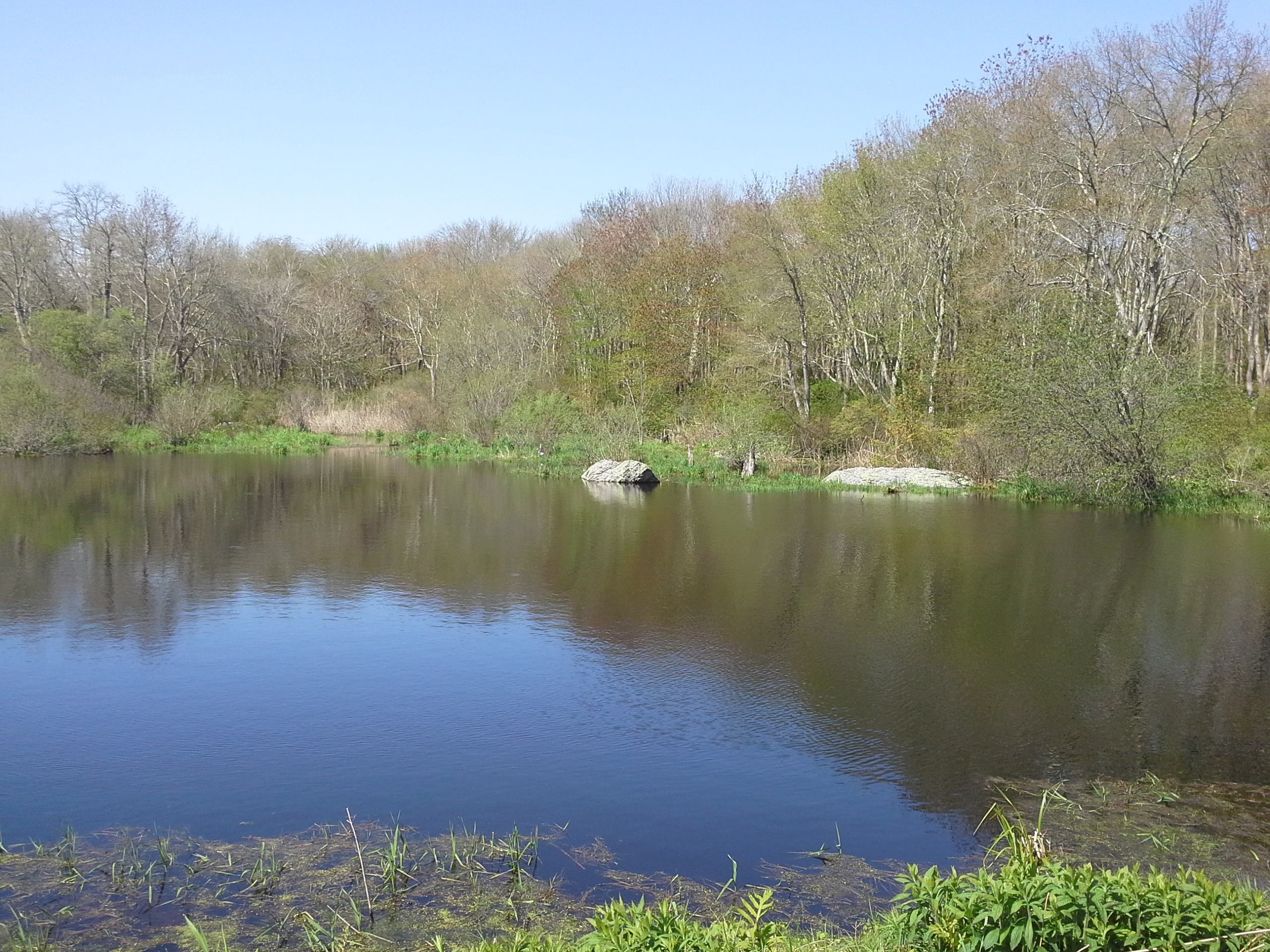

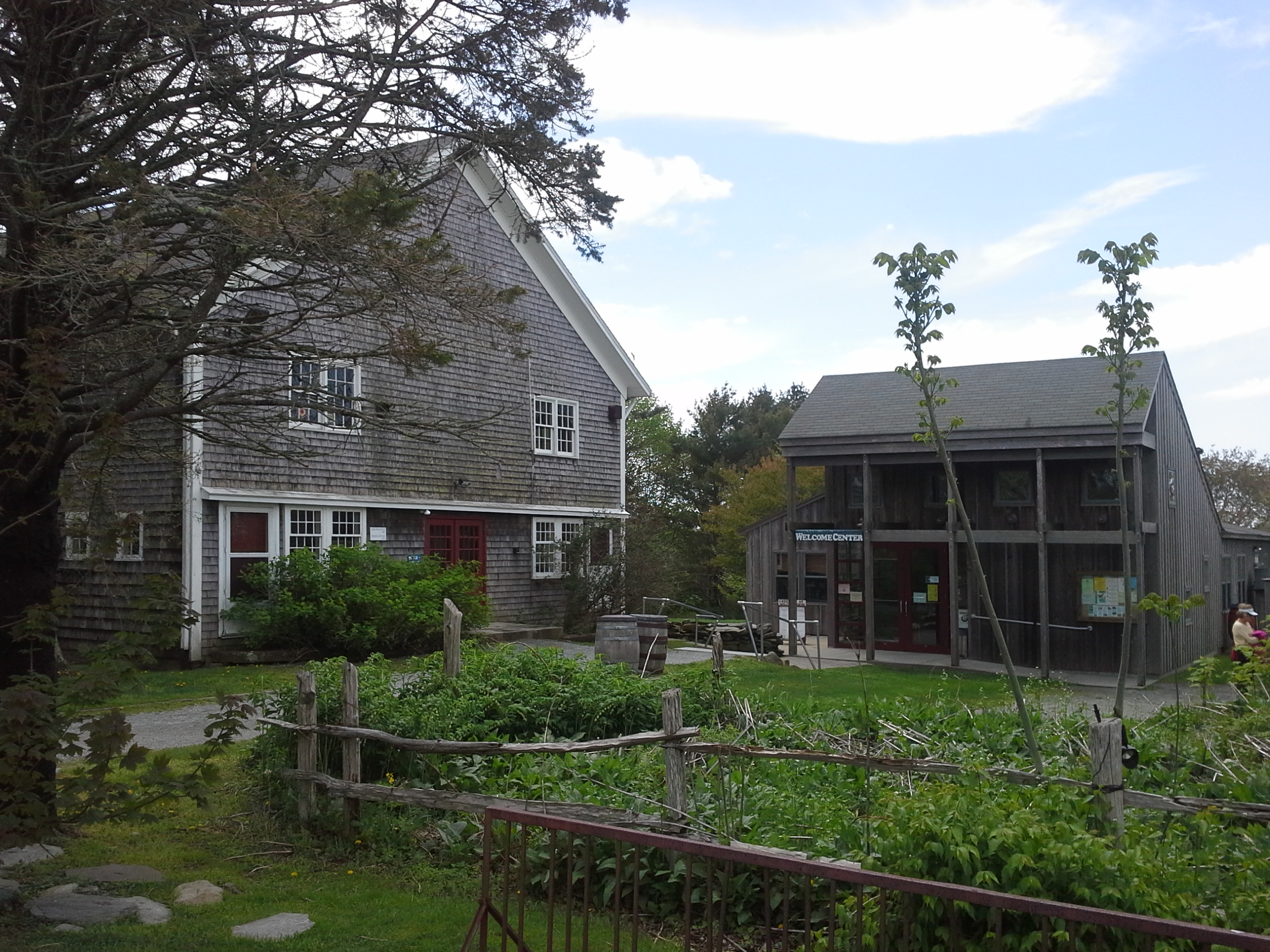

== See also ==
- List of museums in Rhode Island
- National Register of Historic Places listings in Newport County, Rhode Island
- Sachuest Point National Wildlife Refuge
