= Hamilton Hoppin House =

Historic house in Rhode Island, United States

- U.S. National Register of Historic Places
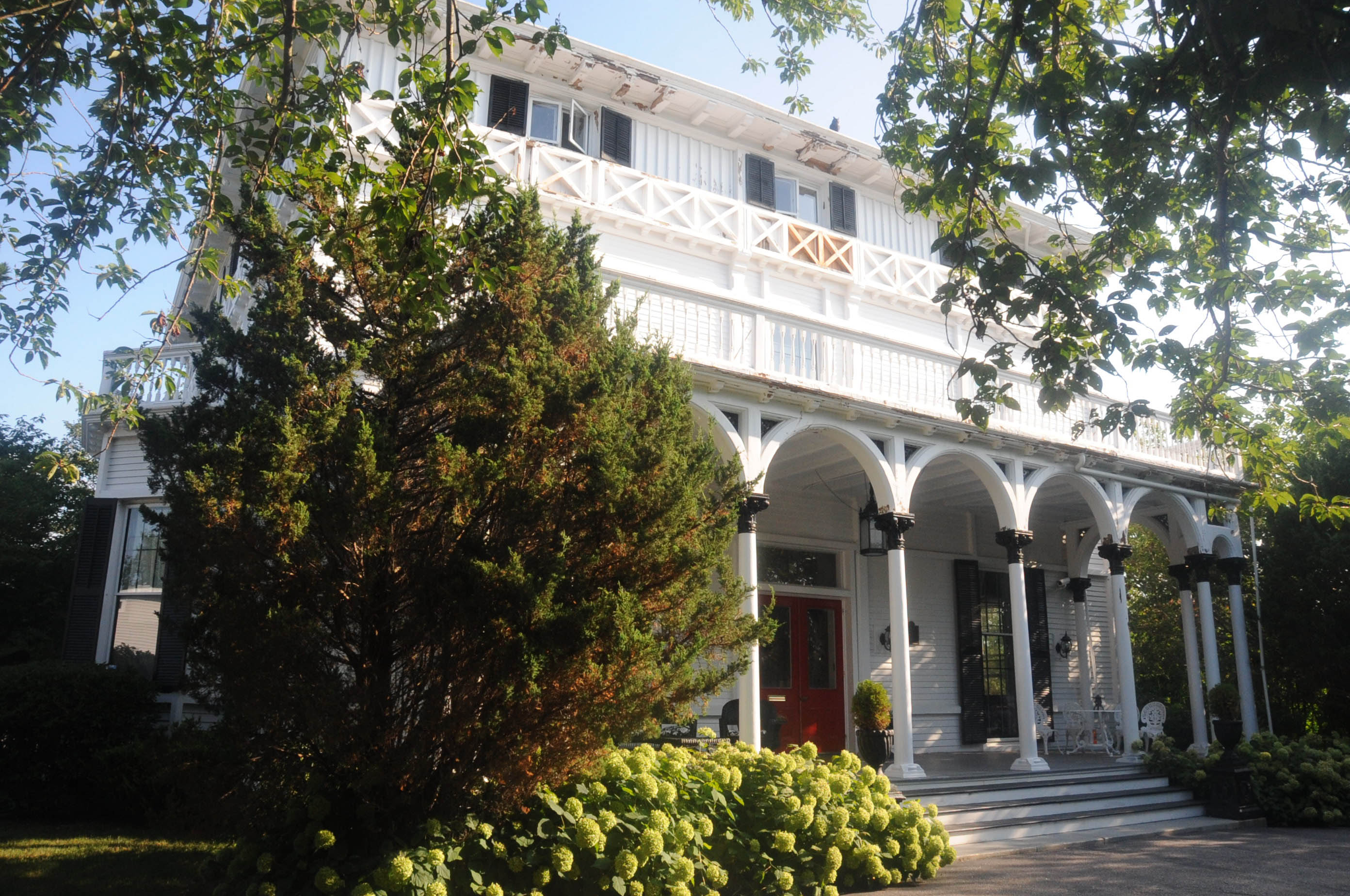
- In 2016

- Location within Rhode Island Location within the United States
- Location: Middletown, Rhode Island
- Coordinates: 41°30′23″N 71°17′52″W
- Built: 1856
- Architect: Upjohn, Richard
- Architectural style: Italianate
- NRHP reference No.: 96000905
- Added to NRHP: August 16, 1996

The Hamilton Hoppin House is an historic house at 120 Miantonomi Ave in Middletown, Rhode Island. It has been known by several names, including Villalon, Montpelier, Shadow Lawn, Agincourt Inn, and, currently, The Inn at Villalon.

The oldest part of the house was designed by architect Richard Upjohn, as was Kingscote in Newport. It was built in an Italianate style in the mid-nineteenth century and it is one of the first Italianate stick-style houses to be built in the United States. The Hamilton Hoppin House was added to the National Register of Historic Places in 1996.

The house was featured on an episode of Weird Travels as the Inn at Shadow Lawn and it was claimed to be haunted.

== See also ==
- National Register of Historic Places listings in Newport County, Rhode Island
