= List of lighthouses in Rhode Island =

This is a list of all lighthouses in the U.S. state of Rhode Island as identified by the United States Coast Guard. There are fifteen active lights in the state as well as two skeleton towers erected to replace earlier staffed lighthouses.

The first lighthouse in the state was erected in 1749 and the last in 1962 (ignoring automated towers erected later); the oldest surviving structure is the much-modified Poplar Point Light, although the tower now standing at Prudence Island Light was first erected at Goat Island in 1824. The tallest extant tower is that at Beavertail Light, though the focal plane of the Block Island Southeast Light is much higher on account of the bluffs upon which it sits.

If not otherwise noted, focal height and coordinates are taken from the United States Coast Guard Light List, while location and dates of activation, automation, and deactivation are taken from the United States Coast Guard historical information site for lighthouses. Locations of demolished lights have been estimated using National Oceanic and Atmospheric Administration (NOAA) navigational charts.

Name	Image	Location	Coordinates	Year first lit	Automated	Year deactivated	Current Lens	Focal Height
Beavertail Lighthouse		Jamestown (Conanicut Island)	41.4493°N 71.3993°W	1749 (Former); 1856 (Current)	1989	Active	VRB-25	68 ft (21 m)
Block Island North Light		New Shoreham (Block Island)	41.2275°N 71.5761°W	1829 (Former); 1867 (Current)	1955	Active (Inactive: 1973–1989, 2008–2010)	Fourth-order Fresnel	61 ft (19 m)
Block Island Southeast Light		New Shoreham (Block Island)	41.1597°N 71.5472°W	1875	1990	Active (Inactive: 1990–1994)	First-order Fresnel	258 ft (79 m)
Brenton Reef Light		Narragansett	41.4264°N 71.3894°W	1962	1962	1989 (Now a lighted buoy)	None	87 ft (27 m)
Bristol Ferry Light		Bristol	41.6431°N 71.2603°W	1855	Never	1927 (Now a private house)	None	35 ft (11 m)
Bullock's Point Light		Providence River	41.7377°N 71.3642°W	1876 (Former); 1939 (Current)	1939 (skeleton tower)	Active (Original tower destroyed)	250mm	50 ft (15 m)
Castle Hill Light		Newport	41.4619°N 71.3633°W	1890	1957	Active	300mm	40 ft (12 m)
Conanicut Island Light		Jamestown (Conanicut Island)	41.5733°N 71.3725°W	1886	Never	1933	None	47 ft (14 m)
Conimicut Shoal Light		Warwick	41.7169°N 71.3458°W	1868 (Former); 1883 (Current)	1966	Active	Unknown	29 ft (8.8 m)
Dutch Island Light		Jamestown	41.4956°N 71.4044°W	1826 (Former); 1857 (Current)	1947	Active (Inactive: 1979-2007)	250mm	56 ft (17 m)
Fuller Rock Light		Providence River	41.7898°N 71.3796°W	1872	1918	1923 (Destroyed) 1923 (Replaced with a skeleton tower renamed Channel Light 42)	250mm	28 ft (8.5 m)
Gould Island Light		Jamestown (Gould Island)	41.534°N 71.343°W	1889	1947 (on skeleton tower 1947–1968)	1947	None	52 ft (16 m)
Gull Rocks Light		Newport	41.5024°N 71.3331°W	1887 (Former); 1928 (Current)	1960	1969 (Demolished)	None	33 ft (10 m)
Hog Island Shoal Light		Portsmouth (Hog Island	41.6322°N 71.2736°W	1901	1964	Active	VLB-44	54 ft (16 m)
Ida Lewis Rock Light		Newport (Lime Rock)	41.4778°N 71.3264°W	1854	1927	1963	None	Unknown
Musselbed Shoals Light		Narragansett Bay (Open water)	41.6363°N 71.2599°W	1873	1939 (skeleton tower)	Active (Original tower destroyed)	35 ft (11 m)	
Nayatt Point Light		Barrington	41.7250°N 71.3397°W	1828 (Former); 1856 (Current)	Unknown	1868	None	Unknown
Newport Harbor Light (Goat Island Light)		Newport (Goat Island)	41.4933°N 71.3270°W	1823 (Former); 1865 (Current)	1923	Active	250mm	33 ft (10 m)
Plum Beach Light		North Kingstown	41.5300°N 71.4056°W	1897	2003 (Relit)	Active (Inactive: 1941–2003)	Unknown	Unknown
Point Judith Light		Narragansett	41.3608°N 71.4819°W	1810 (Former); 1857 (Current)	1954	Active	Fourth-order Fresnel	51 ft (16 m)
Pomham Rocks Light		East Providence	41.7775°N 71.3696°W	1871	2006 (Relit)	Active (on skeleton tower 1974–2006)	Marine LED Beacon VLB-44	67 ft (20 m)
Poplar Point Light		North Kingstown	41.5708°N 71.4397°W	1831	Never	1882 (Now a private house)	None	Unknown
Prudence Island Light		Portsmouth (Prudence Island)	41.6056°N 71.3031°W	1852	1961	Active	250mm	28 ft (8.5 m)
Rose Island Light		Newport (Rose island	41.4956°N 71.3431°W	1870	1992 (Relit)	Active (Inactive: 1971–1992)	Sixth-order Fresnel	48 ft (15 m)
Sabin Point Light		Providence River	41.7619°N 71.3742°W	1872	1956	1968 (Razed)	None	36 ft (11 m)
Sakonnet Light		Little Compton (Sakonnet River)	41.4531°N 71.2031°W	1884	1997 (Relit)	Active (Inactive: 1955–1997)	Unknown	58 ft (18 m)
Sassafras Point Light		Providence River	41.800°N 71.392°W	1872	Never	1912 (Demolished)	None	25 ft (7.6 m)
Warwick Light		Warwick	41.6669°N 71.3786°W	1827 (Former); 1932 (Current)	1985	Active	250mm	66 ft (20 m)
Watch Hill Light		Westerly (Watch Hill)	41.3039°N 71.8584°W	1808 (Former); 1857 (Current)	1986	Active	VRB-25	61 ft (19 m)
Whale Rock Light		Narragansett (Whale Rock)	41.4436°N 71.4236°W	1882	1939	1938 (Destroyed) 1939 (Replaced with skeleton tower)	None	73 ft (22 m)
Wickford Harbor Light		North Kingstown; Wickford	41.5734°N 71.4362°W	1882 (Former); 1930 (Current)	1930 (skeleton tower)	Active (skeleton tower)	250mm	42 ft (13 m)

== See also ==
- List of lighthouses in the United States
- List of tallest lighthouses in the United States
