= National Register of Historic Places listings in Bristol, Rhode Island =

List of Registered Historic Places in Bristol, Rhode Island, which has been transferred from and is an integral part of National Register of Historic Places listings in Bristol County, Rhode Island

Contents: Counties in Rhode Island

Bristol | Kent | Newport | Providence (Pawtucket | Providence (city) | Woonsocket) | Washington

This National Park Service list is complete through NPS recent listings posted May 1, 2026.

	Name on the Register	Image	Date listed	Location	City or town	Description
1	Blithewold	Blithewold	June 27, 1980 (#80000074)	Ferry Rd. 41°39′14″N 71°16′07″W	Bristol	1890s summer retreat established by Augustus Van Wickle, Pennsylvania coal magnate
2	Bristol County Courthouse	Bristol County Courthouse	April 28, 1970 (#70000011)	High St. 41°39′48″N 71°16′17″W	Bristol	
3	Bristol County Jail	Bristol County Jail	April 24, 1973 (#73000048)	48 Court St. 41°40′10″N 71°16′32″W	Bristol	
4	Bristol Customshouse and Post Office	Bristol Customshouse and Post Office	May 31, 1972 (#72000015)	420-448 Hope St. 41°39′58″N 71°16′31″W	Bristol	
5	Bristol Ferry Lighthouse	Bristol Ferry Lighthouse	February 25, 1988 (#87001696)	Ferry Rd. 41°38′35″N 71°15′37″W	Bristol	
6	Bristol Waterfront Historic District	Bristol Waterfront Historic District	March 18, 1975 (#75000053)	Bristol Harbor to E side of Wood St. as far N as Washington St. and S to Walker Cove; 41°40′10″N 71°16′31″W	Bristol	
7	Benjamin Church House	Benjamin Church House	September 22, 1971 (#71000011)	1014 Hope St. 41°41′09″N 71°16′43″W	Bristol	
8	Juniper Hill Cemetery	Juniper Hill Cemetery	June 3, 1998 (#98000632)	24 Sherry Ave. 41°40′53″N 71°16′06″W	Bristol	
9	Longfield	Longfield	July 17, 1972 (#72000016)	1200 Hope St. 41°41′49″N 71°16′47″W	Bristol	
10	Mount Hope Bridge	Mount Hope Bridge	January 31, 1976 (#76000038)	RI 114 over Narragansett Bay; 41°38′25″N 71°15′32″W	Bristol	
11	Mount Hope Farm	Mount Hope Farm	May 2, 1977 (#77000023)	Metacom Ave. 41°40′09″N 71°14′50″W	Bristol	
12	Poppasquash Farms Historic District	Poppasquash Farms Historic District	June 27, 1980 (#80000075)	Off RI 114; 41°40′45″N 71°17′44″W	Bristol	Includes Colt State Park and adjacent properties.
13	Joseph Reynolds House	Joseph Reynolds House	May 31, 1972 (#72000017)	956 Hope St. 41°41′01″N 71°16′46″W	Bristol	Oldest three-story frame house in New England, dating to 1700. Used as headquarters by Lafayette during 1778 Rhode Island campaign.

== See also ==
- National Register of Historic Places listings in Bristol County, Rhode Island
- List of National Historic Landmarks in Rhode Island
