= Musselbed Shoals Light =

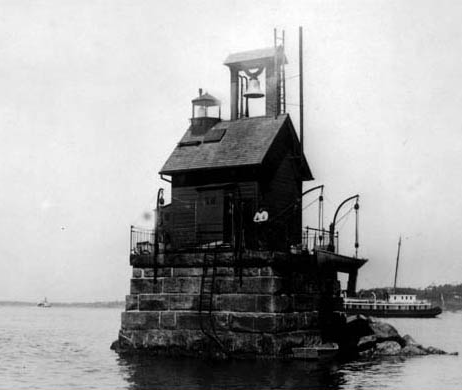
- Musselbed Shoals Light before 1924 enlargement
- Location: South of Bristol Point at west entrance to Mount Hope Bay
- Coordinates: 41°38′10.67″N 71°15′35.80″W

Tower
- Constructed: 1873
- Foundation: stone pier
- Construction: wood frame
- Height: 35 feet (11 m) (incl. foundation)
- Shape: square house with integral tower

Light
- First lit: 1873
- Deactivated: 1938
- Focal height: 8 m (26 ft)
- Lens: sixth-order Fresnel lens
- Range: 6 nmi (11 km; 6.9 mi) (red)
- Characteristic: fixed red

The Musselbed Shoals Light was a lighthouse which once stood in Narragansett Bay at the west entrance to Mount Hope Bay, south of Bristol Point. As with many Rhode Island lights, it was a casualty of the New England Hurricane of 1938.

== History ==
The shoals in this area were already marked by a stone daybeacon when the lighthouse board recommended construction of a light in 1871. This followed some years of unsuccessful attempts to replace the lightship at Hog Island Shoal with a fixed light (the two shoals forming the edges of the channel leading into Mount Hope Bay). Appropriation was made in 1873 and the first light was activated in August of the same year. The form of the structure remained essentially the same over the years: a small square house with a lantern and fog bell set on the roof, all perched on a pier of stone blocks scarcely larger than the house itself. The building, however, had to be rebuilt or massively repaired several times over the years, due to damage from moving ice. Damage to the pier in the winter of 1875 (the whole structure was shifted some four feet) led to enlargement of the pier in 1878, with the house being temporarily relocated to shore. In 1920 the pier was again damaged by ice, and four years later the house was rebuilt, the original single room dwelling being enlarged to four rooms.

The hurricane of 1938 was devastating to the low-sited lighthouses of the region, and Musselbed Shoals was no exception. The light was judged not worth repairing, and in the following year it was demolished and replaced with a skeleton tower which remains in service.
