= Union Church (Portsmouth, Rhode Island) =

Historic church in Rhode Island, United States

- U.S. National Register of Historic Places
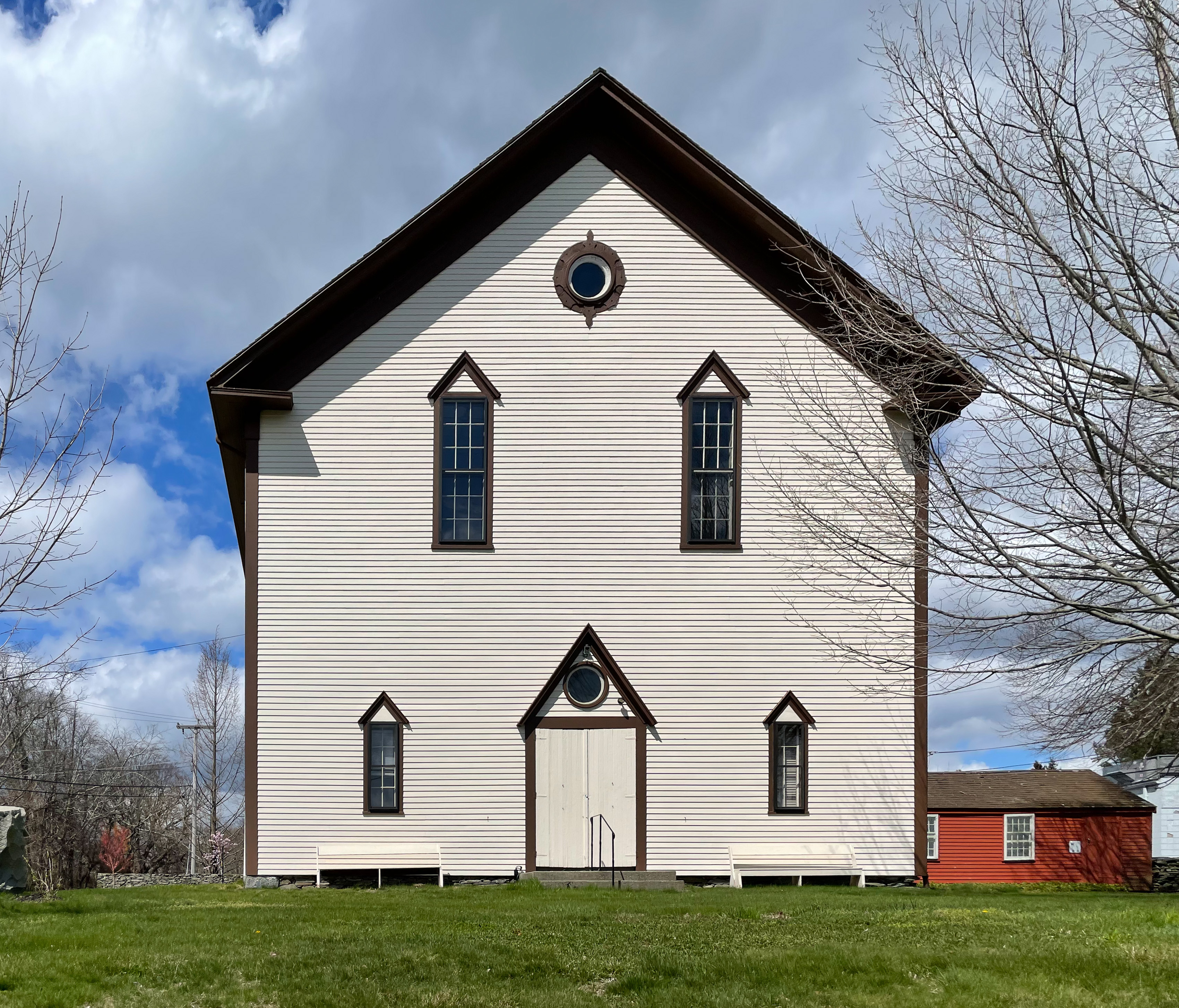
- (2022)

- Location within Rhode Island Location within the United States
- Location: 870 E. Main Rd. at Union St. Portsmouth, Rhode Island
- Coordinates: 41°33′30″N 71°15′22″W
- Built: 1865
- NRHP reference No.: 74000045
- Added to NRHP: June 13, 1974

The Union Church is an historic church and local history museum owned by the Portsmouth Historical Society at 870 East Main Road at Union Street in Portsmouth, Rhode Island. One exhibit room is dedicated to Julia Ward Howe and includes a collection of furniture from her summer home in Portsmouth and a display about her life.

== History ==
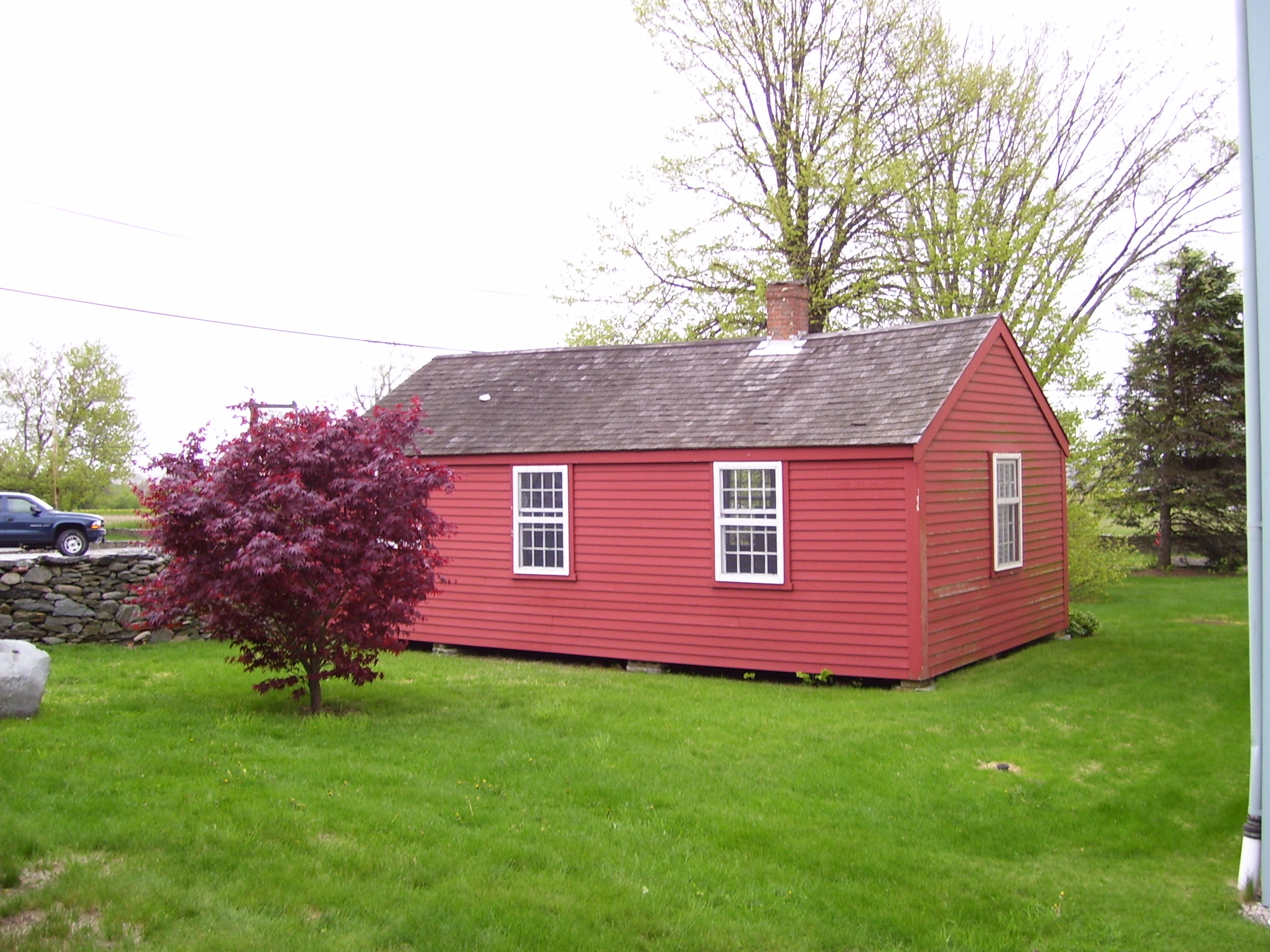
The 1725 schoolhouse owned by the Portsmouth Historical Society is one of the oldest surviving in the U.S.

The Union Church building was constructed in 1865 at the cost of $7,000 for the congregation of the Portsmouth Christian Union Church, which was founded in 1810 and originally met in homes and then a smaller meeting house. The congregation was active until after World War I. The last worship service was held in 1937 and then it was declared a defunct organization by the Superior Court in 1940 with the fourteen remaining members voting to donate the property to the Portsmouth Historical Society. It now houses the majority of the historical society's collections.

The former church building was added to the National Register of Historic Places in 1974.

Adjacent to the church is a 1725 schoolhouse building. The Society opens the museum buildings weekly.

== See also ==
- National Register of Historic Places listings in Newport County, Rhode Island
- List of historical societies in Rhode Island
