= Hog Island (Rhode Island) =

Island in Narragansett Bay, Rhode Island, USA

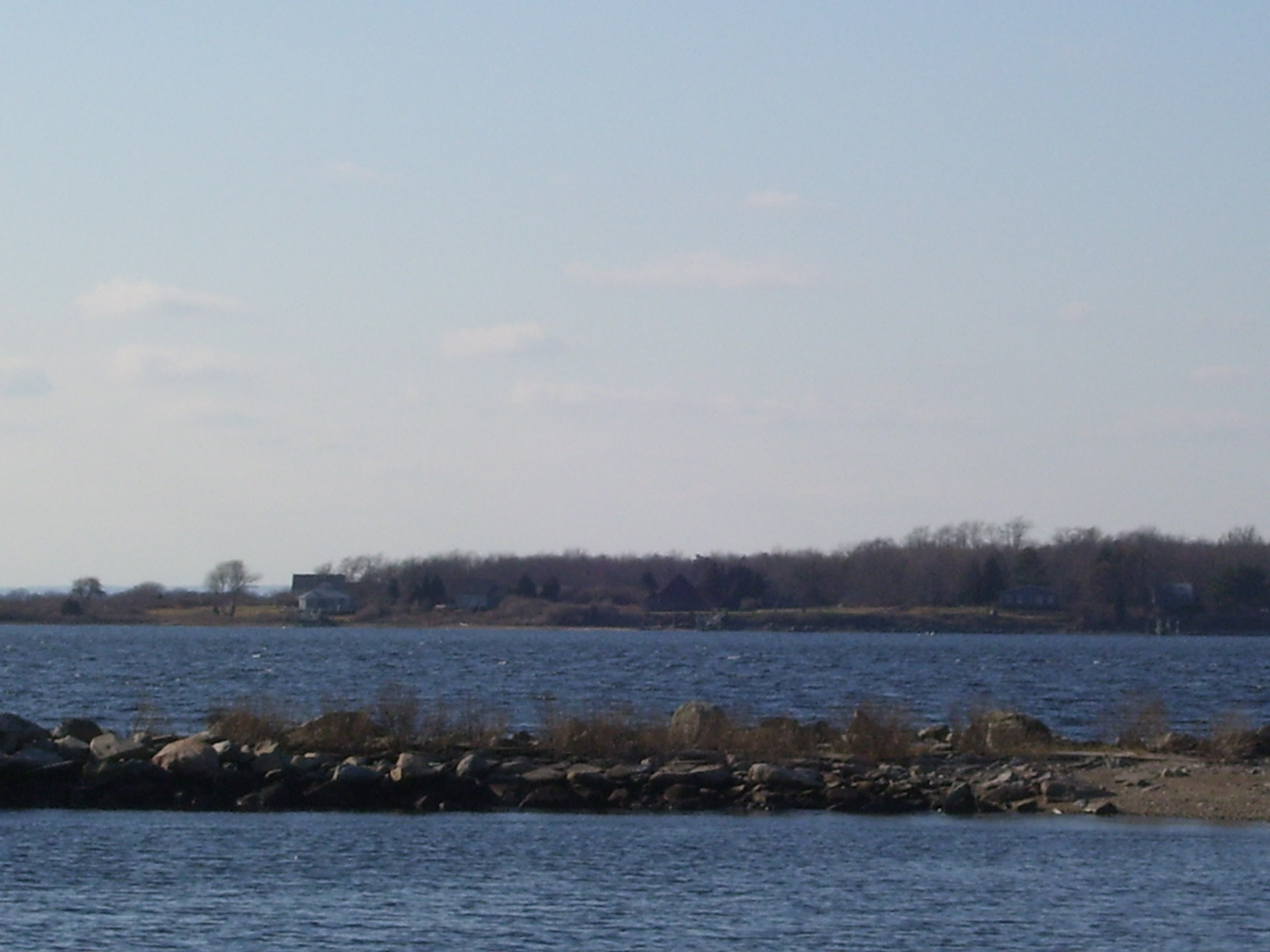
Hog Island in the distance, seen from near the Bristol Ferry Light

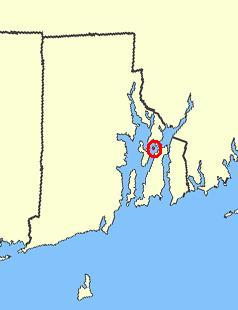
Hog Island, circled in red, in the inner part of Narragansett Bay

Hog Island is an American island in Narragansett Bay in Rhode Island. It lies at the entrance to the harbor of Bristol and is part of the town of Portsmouth. The 60 ft (18 m) tall Hog Island Shoal Lighthouse stands off the south end, warning ships of the dangerous shoals around the island. It has a land area of approximately 0.3 sq mi (78 ha; 190 acres), making it the fifth-largest island in Narragansett Bay. It is home to a small summer vacation colony, with no regular year-round residents, and there are approximately 100 homes on it.

It is serviced by the Bristol–Prudence Island ferry by reservation only.

On July 1, 2021, "The Boathouse", a 120-year-old boathouse burned down. There were no deaths nor injuries in the fire. The boathouse still is unrepaired as of June 2026.

== External links and further reading ==
- Hog Island: Block Group 7, Census Tract 401.03, Newport County, Rhode Island United States Census Bureau
- Hog Island Shoal Lighthouse
- Frederic Denlson (1879). The Past and the Present: Narragansett Sea and Shore. Providence, RI: J.A. & R.A. Reid.
- George L. Seavey, Rhode Island's Coastal Natural Areas, ISBN 9780938412137
