= Green Animals Topiary Garden =

Topiary garden in Portsmouth, Rhode Island

Coordinates: 41°36′0.03″N 71°16′28.63″W

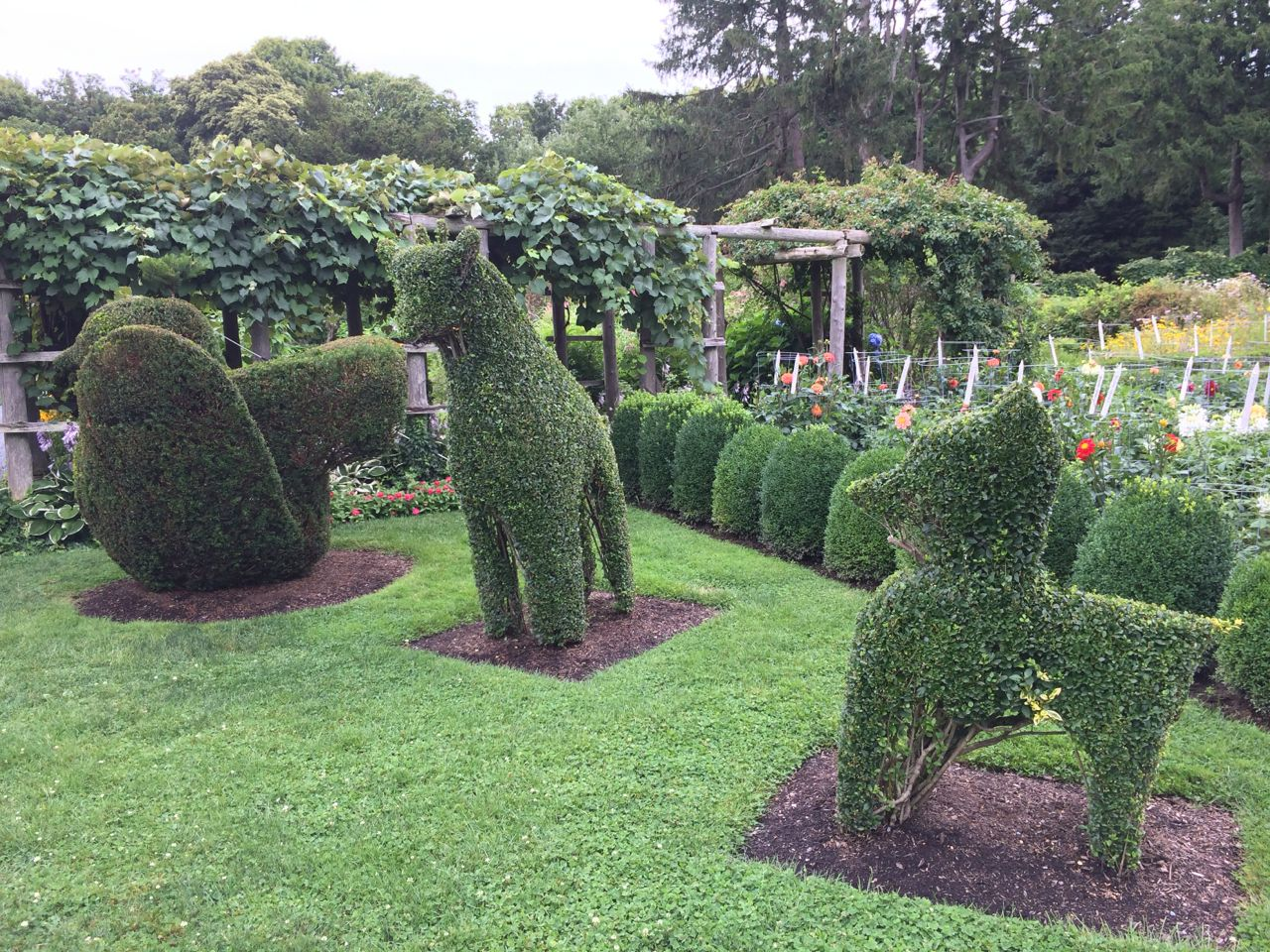
Topiary animals in the Garden

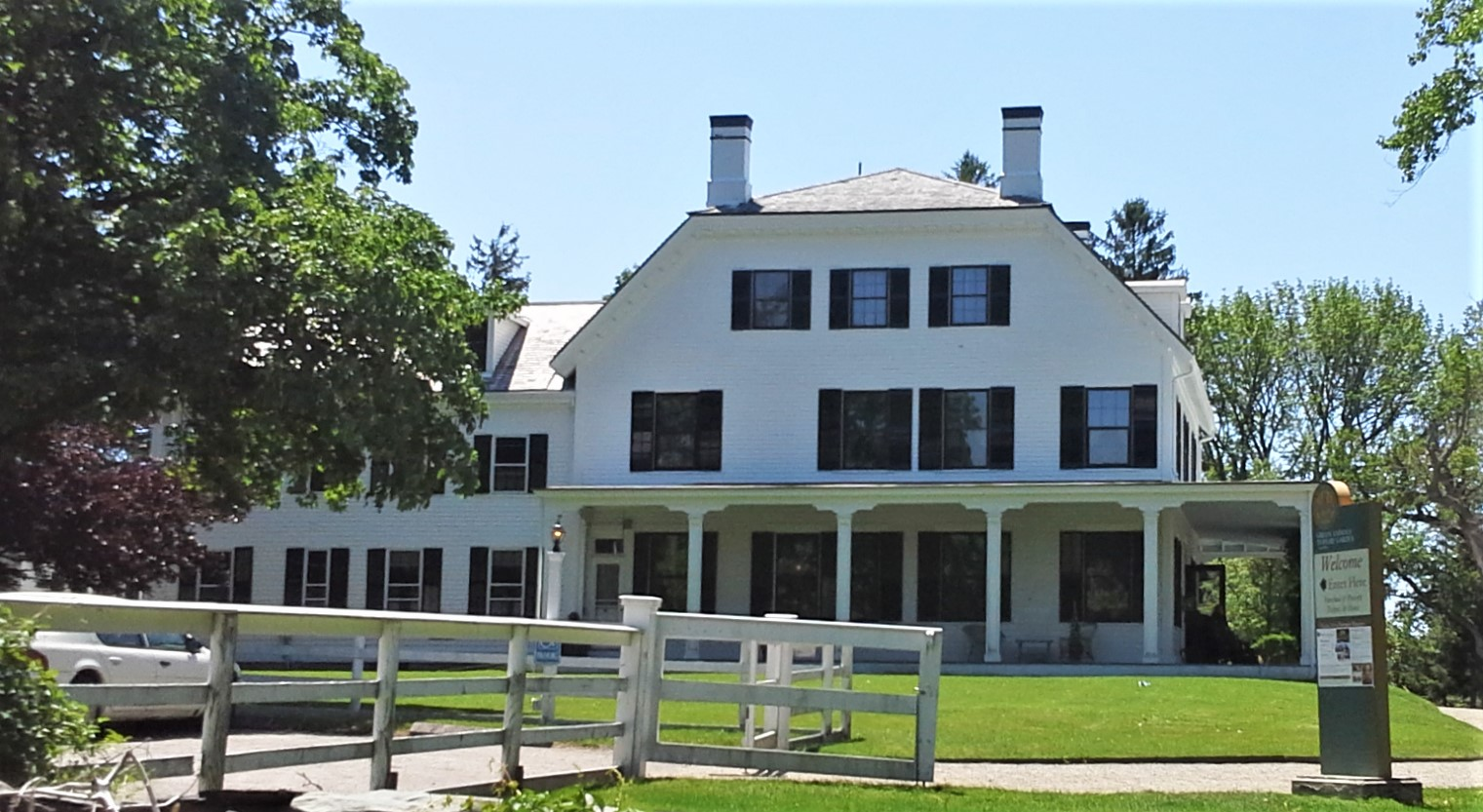
Brayton House at Green Animals Topiary Garden

The Green Animals Topiary Garden, located in Portsmouth, Rhode Island, is the oldest and most northern topiary garden in the United States. The 7-acre (28,000 m^{2}) estate overlooks the Narragansett Bay. It contains a large collection of topiaries including eighty sculptured trees. Favorites include teddy bears, a camel, a giraffe, an ostrich, an elephant and two bears made from sculptured California privet, yew, and English boxwood. There are also pineapples, a unicorn, a reindeer, a dog and spot a horse with his rider. There are over 35 formal flowerbeds, geometric pathways, rose arbor, grape arbor, fruit trees, and vegetable and herb gardens. A greenhouse is used extensively to provide seedlings used on the estate. The 1859 Victorian Brayton house museum contains a small display of vintage kids toy and the original family furnishings. Ribbons for prize-winning dahlias and vegetables, dating from about 1915, line the walls of the gift shop. The Preservation Society of Newport County maintains it.

== History ==
The small country estate in Portsmouth was purchased in 1872 by Thomas E. Brayton (1844–1939), He was the treasurer of the Union Cotton Manufacturing Company in nearby Fall River, Massachusetts and he was looking for a country summer retreat. It consisted of 7 acres (28,000 m^{2}) of land, a white clapboard summer residence, farm outbuildings, a pasture and a vegetable garden. The main Victorian home looked out on Narragansett Bay.

It was Gardener Joseph Carreiro, superintendent of the property from 1905 to 1945 who slowly transformed it into a museum of living sculpture. Carreiro was recruited to design and maintain ornamental and edible gardens as part of a self-sufficient estate. Besides planting fruit trees, perennial beds, herb and vegetable gardens, Carreiro experimented with trimming some fast-growing shrubs into unique forms. The first topiaries were started in the estate's greenhouse in 1912 and later moved.

Mr. Brayton died in 1939 and his daughter Alice Brayton took up permanent residence in 1940. Joseph Carreiro was assisted by his son-in-law, George Mendonca. Both gardeners were responsible for creating the topiaries. Mendonca, the son of a nurseryman and dairy farmer, was hired to make repairs in the Brayton garden after a hurricane damaged it in 1938. Mendonca married Carreiro's daughter, Mary, and together they lived on the grounds overlooking Narragansett Bay. George and Mary Mendonca died less than one day apart, Mary on February 1, 2011 and George on February 2, 2011.

Miss Brayton renamed the estate "Green Animals" due their proficient work. Each individual topiary was hand trimmed and trained using the traditional technique. This took decades. Today, modern topiaries often are trained on a metal frame or trellis to shorten the time the transformation takes place. It was under her direction a menagerie of 30 topiaries was created. During five decades of Mendonca's care, the garden grew into a horticultural destination. Additional hurricane damage was sustained in 1954. The giraffe lost its head and neck. It took five years to grow back with a much shorter neck.

The estate hosted a coming-out party for Jackie Bouvier during the 1947-48 season. She went on to marry President John F. Kennedy. Her stepfather resided in nearby Newport and she was wed in a local church. The estate hosted other dignitaries over the years including Mamie Eisenhower, the wife of President Dwight Eisenhower.

Upon her death in 1972, at the age of 94, Miss Brayton left Green Animals to The Preservation Society of Newport County. Mendonca remained the grounds manager until his retirement in 1985. Each year, Green Animals hosts a children's party, attracting about 1,000 people.

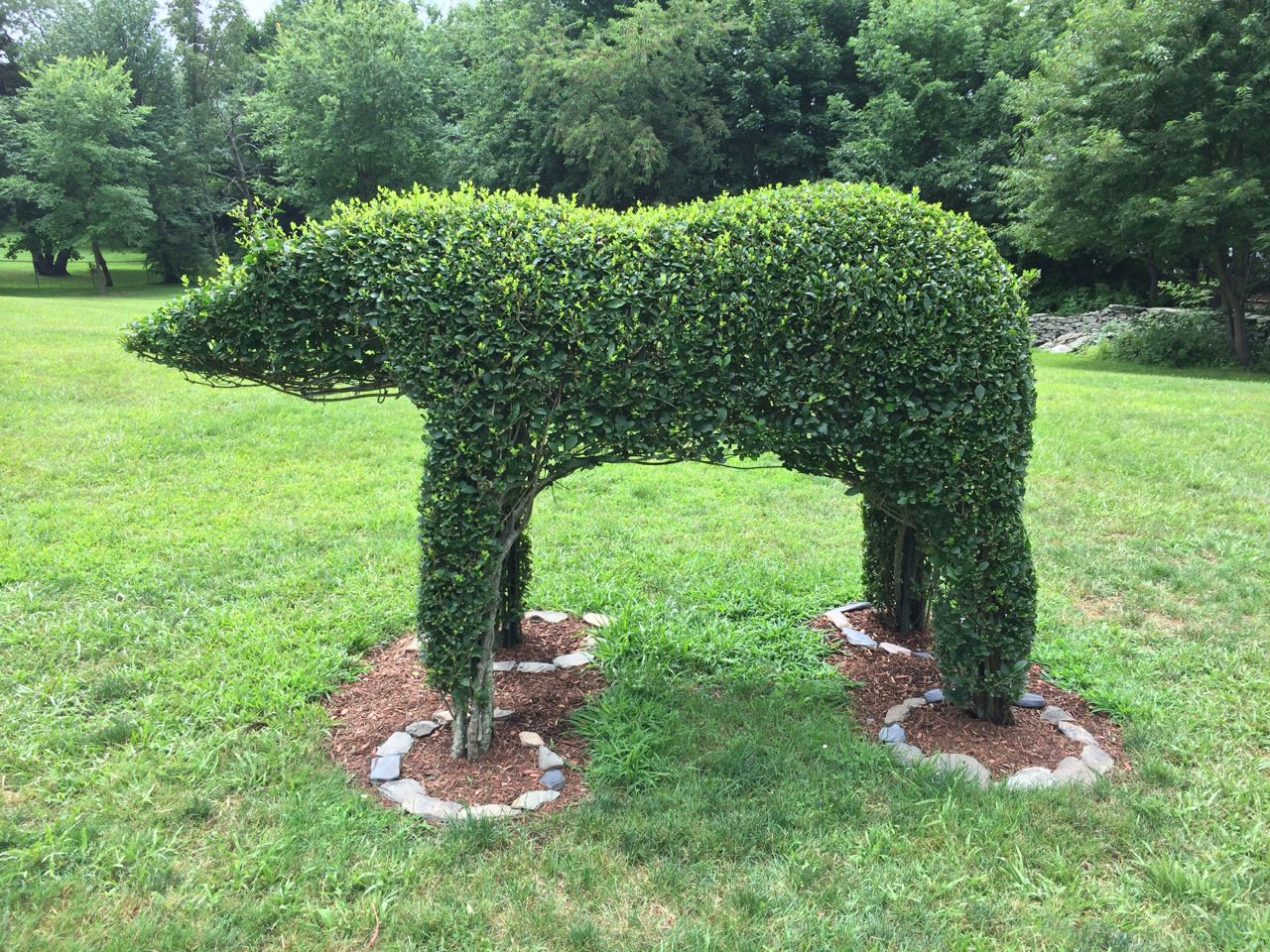
A topiary in the Garden

== Plant information ==
The oldest topiaries were started from boxwood (Buxus sempervirens) seedlings in 1912 shaped from California privet (Ligustrum ovalifolium). Boxwood is more commonly used for topiary than privet except at Green Animals. Boxwood is a dense small-leaved native evergreen, with dark green glossy foliage. Slow growing and shade tolerant. The foliage is not always suited for Northern climates as the foliage cab is injured by cold temperatures. The boxwood on the estate suffers from a fungal infection attributed to an irrigation system that has left the soil around the boxwood too moist for too long. The geometric shapes in the garden are made from boxwood. New varieties are being tested to replace the older ones.

Topiaries made in the 1940s, continued to be made from California privet. Privet is a semi evergreen shrub is fast growing with dark green, elliptic leaves. It was used because it produced relatively quick results. Since it was a summer residence, it was not a concern that privet was deciduous and sheds its leaves in the fall. It requires regular pruning and maintenance including weekly hand trimming. Some conservation metal supports have been discreetly positioned inside the forms to provide stability in wind and snow.

Newer topiaries are made of English yew (Taxus baccata) a sturdy needled evergreen that requires pruning only once or twice a year. However, yew's dense, multibranched habit is more difficult to manipulate. The geometric shapes in the garden are boxwood, which is evergreen and doesn't take detail well.

Paths and plants near the home and entrance are more formal then newer areas of the estates. Towards the entrance classic plantings are features. Areas developed in the 1970s feature more contemporary free-form topiaries.

The grounds also include a small orchard, a cutting garden, a vegetable patch and gourd arbor, and a damask rose garden. Vegetables from the garden are maintained by a community farm program and the produce is used by the Rhode Island Food Bank.

The greenhouse starts flower seedlings in January and February. Vegetables are started in March. Seedlings are moved to a series of cold frames in the next few months. Unlike most cold frames, the estate frames are not made of wood. The cold frames are made of concrete footings poured below the frost line. They were designed by Alice Brayton.

== Gardeners ==
- Joseph Carreiro, superintendent of Green Animals, 1905–1945
- George Mendonça, superintendent of Green Animals 1950-1985
- Ernest Wasson, Grounds Manager, 1985–1990
- Crisse Genga, Grounds Manager, 1990 to 2002
- Mary Ann Von Handorf, gardener 1988-2002, Grounds Manager, 2002–2003
- Eugene Platt, topiarist 2002–2020
- James Donahue, horticulturist, 2004–2014
- Dan Christina, Chief horticulturist and Manager, 2014-3/2023

== Documentary ==
Fast, Cheap, and Out of Control is a 1997 documentary by Errol Morris. One segment of the film focuses on George Mendonça's work at Green Animals.

- Film synopsis
