= Poplar Point Light =

- Location: North Kingstown, Rhode Island
- Coordinates: 41°34′15″N 71°26′23″W

Tower
- Constructed: 1765
- Construction: Wood
- Height: 45 feet (14 m)
- Shape: Octagonal with attached house
- Markings: White with black trim
- Heritage: National Register of Historic Places listed place

Light
- First lit: 1831
- Deactivated: 1882
- Lens: 8 lamps, 14.5 inches (370 mm)
- Poplar Point Lighthouse
- U.S. National Register of Historic Places
- Poplar Light, ca. 1900
- Area: 1.5 acres (0.61 ha)
- MPS: Lighthouses of Rhode Island TR
- NRHP reference No.: 87001703
- Added to NRHP: February 25, 1988

Poplar Point Light (Lighthouse), built in 1831, is an historic lighthouse in North Kingstown, Rhode Island. It stands at the end of Poplar Point, marking the southern point of Wickford Harbor. The lighthouse was built in 1831 with a stone keeper's dwelling and wooden tower. The light was deactivated in 1882 and replaced by the Wickford Harbor Light. It was sold at auction in 1894 and has been altered by later owners. The lighthouse was listed on the National Register of Historic Places in 1988. The tower is the oldest surviving wooden lighthouse tower in the United States, and the oldest in Rhode Island still standing at its original location.

== See also ==
- National Register of Historic Places listings in Washington County, Rhode Island
