= Gould Island Light =

- Location: north end of Gould Island
- Coordinates: 41°32′4″N 71°20′38″W

Tower
- Construction: brick
- Height: 30 feet (9.1 m)
- Shape: conical tower

Light
- First lit: 1889
- Deactivated: 1947
- Focal height: 52 feet (16 m)
- Lens: fifth-order Fresnel lens
- Characteristic: flashing white 30 sec.

Gould Island Light was a lighthouse located on Gould Island in Narragansett Bay.

== History ==
Prior to 1885 the Old Colony Steamboat Company maintained its own light on the island. There were concerns about its reliability, and in 1885 the lighthouse board requested funds to build its own light. A $10,000 appropriation provided for a tower with a fog bell and a separate keeper's house, and in 1889 the light was shown for the first time. The plans for the keeper's house were reused for the Coney Island Light, built the following year.

The light was constructed about two-thirds of the way north along the east coast of the narrow island, and over the years complaints were registered that the light could not be seen from the south due to obstructing trees. Cutting down trees failed to resolve the problem, and in 1932 a second light was erected, an automated light on a skeleton tower at the southernmost point of the island.

The original light was extinguished in 1947, replaced by a skeleton tower nearby. This tower collapsed in 1988, and the site was abandoned, though the light on the south of the island remains in service. The tower and keeper's house were torn down in 1960.
