= Portsmouth, Rhode Island =

- Town
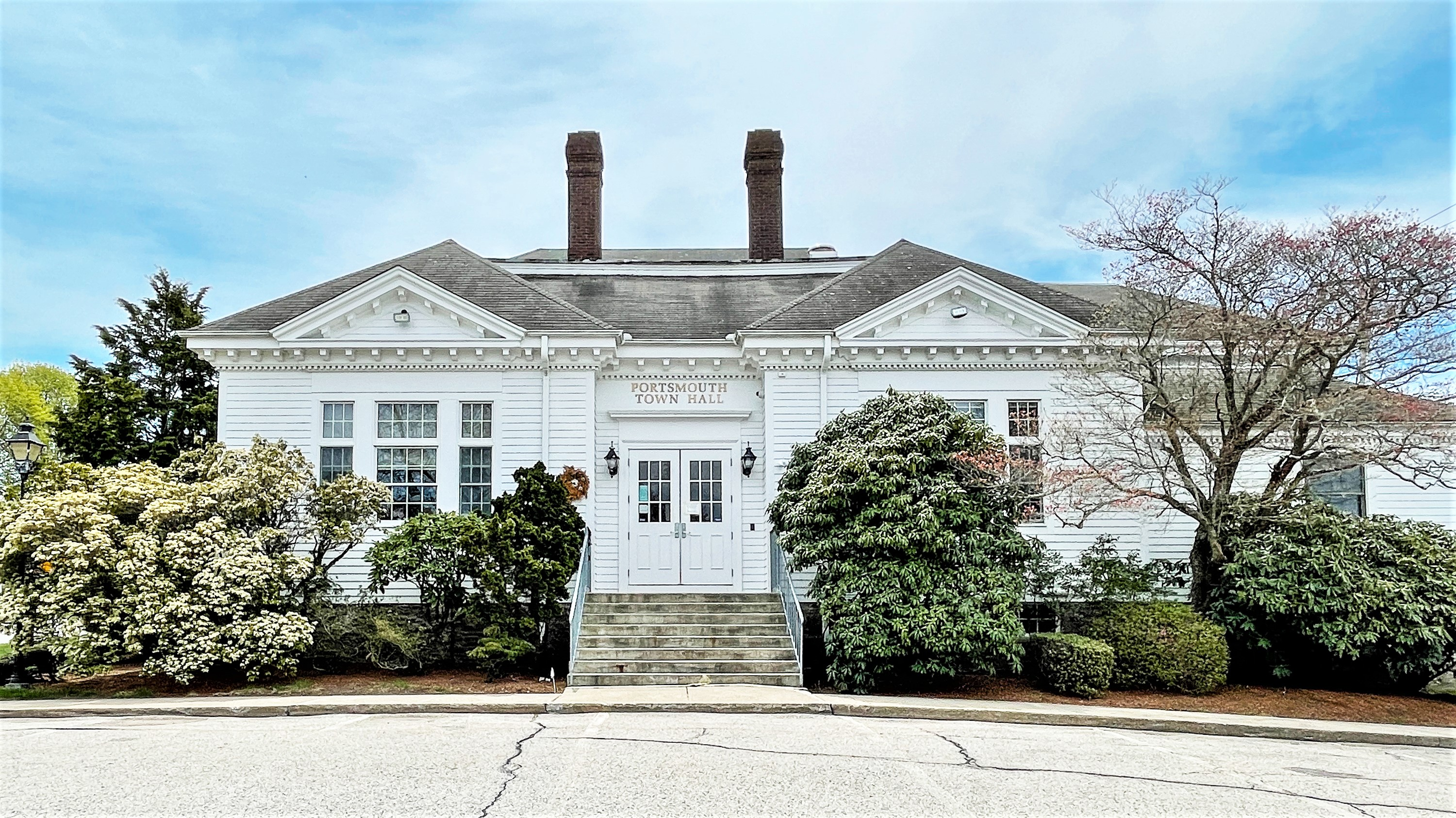
- Town Hall

- Seal Logo

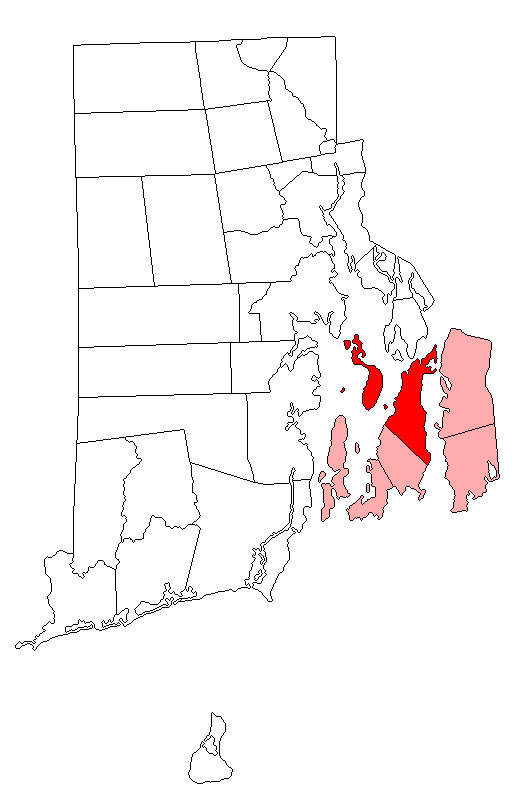
- Location of Portsmouth in Newport County, Rhode Island
- Coordinates: 41°36′N 71°15′W
- Country: United States
- State: Rhode Island
- County: Newport
- Established: March 7, 1638

Government
  - Town Council: Keith E. Hamilton (R), President; Sondra A. Blank (D); David M. Gleason (R); Mary A. McDowell (I); Sharlene M. Patton (R); Juan Carlos Payero (D); David G. Reise (R)
  - Town Clerk: Jennifer M. West

Area
  - Total: 59.3 sq mi (153.6 km^{2})
  - Land: 23.2 sq mi (60.1 km^{2})
  - Water: 36.1 sq mi (93.5 km^{2})
- Elevation: 203 ft (62 m)

Population (2020)
  - Total: 17,871
  - Density: 770/sq mi (297.4/km^{2})
- Time zone: UTC−5 (Eastern (EST))
  - Summer (DST): UTC−4 (EDT)
- ZIP Code: 02871
- Area code: 401
- FIPS code: 44-57880
- GNIS feature ID: 1220065
- Website: www.portsmouthri.gov

Portsmouth is a town in Newport County, Rhode Island, United States. The population was 17,871 at the 2020 U.S. census. Portsmouth is the second-oldest municipality in Rhode Island, after Providence; it was one of the four colonies which merged to form the Colony of Rhode Island and Providence Plantations, the others being Providence, Newport, and Warwick.

== Geography ==
According to the United States Census Bureau, the town has a total area of 59.3 square miles (154 km^{2}), of which 23.2 square miles (60 km^{2}) (39.14%) is land and 36.1 square miles (93 km^{2}) (60.86%) is water. Most of its land area lies on Aquidneck Island, which it shares with Middletown and Newport. In addition, Portsmouth encompasses some smaller islands, including Prudence Island, Patience Island, Hope Island and Hog Island. Part of the census-designated place of Melville lies within the town boundaries.

Portsmouth Compact memorial at Founder's Brook

== History ==
Portsmouth was settled in 1638 by a group of religious dissenters from Massachusetts Bay Colony, including Dr. John Clarke, William Coddington, and Anne Hutchinson. It is named after Portsmouth, Hampshire, England. Roger Williams convinced the settlers that they should go there instead of settling in the Province of New Jersey, where they had first planned on going.

It was founded by the signers of the Portsmouth Compact. Its original name was Pocasset and it was officially named Portsmouth on May 12, 1639. It became part of the Colony of Rhode Island and Providence Plantations (see Aquidneck Island) and eventually part of the State of Rhode Island and Providence Plantations.

== Schools ==
=== Public ===
The Portsmouth School Department operates public schools:

- Portsmouth High School
- Portsmouth Middle School
- Howard W. Hathaway Elementary School
- Melville Elementary School
- Prudence Island School (a Charter/Co-op "Home School" as of September 2009)

=== Private ===
- Portsmouth Abbey School (9th Grade through 12th Grade)
- Saint Philomena School (Pre-Kindergarten through 8th Grade)
- The Pennfield School (Nursery through 8th Grade)

== Commerce ==
Portsmouth is home to the Portsmouth Business Park, as well as a few small plazas with a variety of businesses. Portsmouth is also home to the Raytheon Missiles & Defense division. Adjacent to Raytheon is the Newport Car Museum which opened in 2017 and receives 50,000 visitors a year.

== Sports ==
Portsmouth is the headquarters of US Sailing, the national governing body of sailing in the U.S. It is also home to the Newport International Polo Series held at Glen Farm.

== Music ==
On September 21, 2017, plaques were unveiled by Roger Williams University, along with Al Gomes and Connie Watrous of Big Noise, at the Baypoint Inn & Conference Center honoring music icons The Beach Boys. The plaques were to commemorate the band's concert on September 22, 1971 in Portsmouth. The concert was the first-ever appearance of South African Ricky Fataar as an official member of the band and Filipino Billy Hinsche as a touring member, essentially changing The Beach Boys' live and recording act's line-up into a multi-cultural group. Diversity is a credo of Roger Williams University, which is why they chose to celebrate this moment in the band's history.

Jimmy Buffett performed at the Sunset Cove restaurant on July 2, 2023, which was his final public performance before his death on September 1 of that year.

== Demographics ==
Historical population
Census	Pop.	Note	%±
1790	1,560		—
1800	1,684		7.9%
1810	1,795		6.6%
1820	1,645		−8.4%
1830	1,727		5.0%
1840	1,706		−1.2%
1850	1,833		7.4%
1860	2,048		11.7%
1870	2,003		−2.2%
1880	1,979		−1.2%
1890	1,949		−1.5%
1900	2,105		8.0%
1910	2,681		27.4%
1920	2,590		−3.4%
1930	2,969		14.6%
1940	3,683		24.0%
1950	6,578		78.6%
1960	8,251		25.4%
1970	12,521		51.8%
1980	14,257		13.9%
1990	16,857		18.2%
2000	17,149		1.7%
2010	17,389		1.4%
2020	17,871		2.8%
U.S. Decennial Census

=== 2020 U.S. Census ===
As of the census of 2020, there were 17,871 people and 7,280 households in the town. The population density was 776.2 inhabitants per square mile (299.7/km^{2}). There were 8,610 housing units in the town. The racial makeup of the town was 89.05% White, 1.63% African American, 0.23% Native American, 1.72% Asian, 0.08% Pacific Islander, 1.21% from other races, and 6.08% from two or more races. Hispanic or Latino of any race were 3.63% of the population.

There were 7,280 households, out of which 26.8% had children under the age of 18 living with them, 58.5% were married couples living together, 24.2% had a female householder with no spouse present and 12.3% had a male householder with no spouse present. 8.9% of all households were made up of individuals, and 5.1% had someone living alone who was 65 years of age or older. The average household size was 2.39 and the average family size was 2.84.

In the town, the population age distribution is 19.3% under the age of 18, 6.8% from 18 to 24, 19.6% from 25 to 44, 29.9% from 45 to 64, and 24.4% who were 65 years of age or older. The median age was 48 years.

The median income for a household in the town was $119,500, and the median income for a family was $151,063. The per capita income for the town was $64,438. About 4.4% of the population were below the poverty line, including 5.1% of those under age 18 and 4.6% of those age 65 or over.

=== 2010 U.S. Census ===
The 2010 U.S. census reported that there were 17,349 people, or an increase of 1.15%, residing in the town. The racial makeup of the town was 94.57% White, 1.35% African American, 1.58% Asian, 0.21% American Indian or Alaskan Native, 0.04% Native Hawaiian or Pacific Islander, 0.40% of some other race, and 1.86% of two or more races.

In the town, 22.98% of the population was under the age of 18 and 16.47% were 65 years of age or older. Females made up 51.03% of the population.

=== 2000 U.S. Census ===
The 2000 U.S. Census reported that there were 17,149 people, or an increase of 1.7%, residing in the town. There were also 6,758 households, and 4,865 families recorded. The population density was 739.0 inhabitants per square mile (285.3/km^{2}). There were 7,386 housing units at an average density of 318.3 units per square mile (122.9 units/km^{2}). The racial makeup of the town was 95.82% White, 1.17% African American, 0.19% Native American, 1.36% Asian, 0.03% Pacific Islander, 0.37% from other races, and 1.05% from two or more races. Hispanic or Latino of any race were 1.45% of the population.

There were 6,758 households, of which 33.4% had children under the age of 18 living with them, 61.1% were married couples living together, 8.0% had a female householder with no husband present, and 28.0% were non-families. 23.3% of all households were made up of individuals, and 10.0% had someone living alone who was 65 years of age or older. The average household size was 2.53 and the average family size was 3.00.

In the town, the population age distribution is 25.2% under the age of 18, 5.0% from 18 to 24, 29.5% from 25 to 44, 26.9% from 45 to 64, and 13.5% who were 65 years of age or older. The median age was 40 years. For every 100 females, there were 96.5 males. For every 100 females age 18 and over, there were 92.6 males.

The median income for a household in the town was $88,835, and the median income for a family was $108,577. Males had a median income of $46,297 versus $31,745 for females. The per capita income for the town was $46,161. About 2.0% of families and 3.4% of the population were below the poverty line, including 2.8% of those under age 18 and 6.4% of those age 65 or over.

== Historic sites and points of interest ==
- Battle of Rhode Island Site
- Borden Farm
- Greenvale Farm (1864)
- Green Animals Topiary Garden
- Hog Island Shoal Lighthouse (1901)
- Lawton-Almy-Hall Farm
- Mount Hope Bridge (1929)
- Oak Glen
- Portsmouth Friends Meetinghouse Parsonage and Cemetery (c. 1699)
- Prudence Island Lighthouse (1823)
- Union Church (1865)
- Wreck Sites of H.M.S. Cerberus and H.M.S. Lark (1778)

== Notable people ==
- Ade Bethune (1914–2002), liturgical artist and Catholic Worker
- Jeremy Clarke (1605–1652), early settler of Portsmouth, served as second governor of Rhode Island colony
- Mike Cloud, running back for the Kansas City Chiefs, New England Patriots, and New York Giants
- Chris Cosentino, chef and cast member of "The Next Iron Chef"
- Charlie Day, American actor, screenwriter, producer, comedian, and musician
- Sarah J. Eddy (1851–1945), American artist, photographer, and suffragist
- Julia Ward Howe (1819–1910), author of "The Battle Hymn of the Republic"
- Anne Hutchinson (1591–1643), religious figure; one of the founders of Portsmouth, in 1638
- Betty Hutton (1921–2007), film actress and singer
- Patrick Kennedy, U.S. congressman for Rhode Island's First district (1995–2011)
- Scotty Kilmer, auto mechanic educator followed by millions on YouTube
- Frances Latham (1610–1677), wife of Governor Jeremy Clarke, early settler of Portsmouth, known as the "mother of governors"
- Ronald Machtley, U.S. congressman, President of Bryant University
- Michelle McGaw, state representative from the Rhode Island House of Representatives representing Little Compton, Tiverton, and Portsmouth
- Cortlandt Parker (1884–1960), US Army major general
- Peleg Slocum (1654–1733), Quaker, former proprietor of Dartmouth, Massachusetts and former owner of Cuttyhunk Island
- Cole Swider, professional basketball player for the Los Angeles Lakers
- Ryan Westmoreland, former baseball player, Boston Red Sox prospect

== Gallery ==
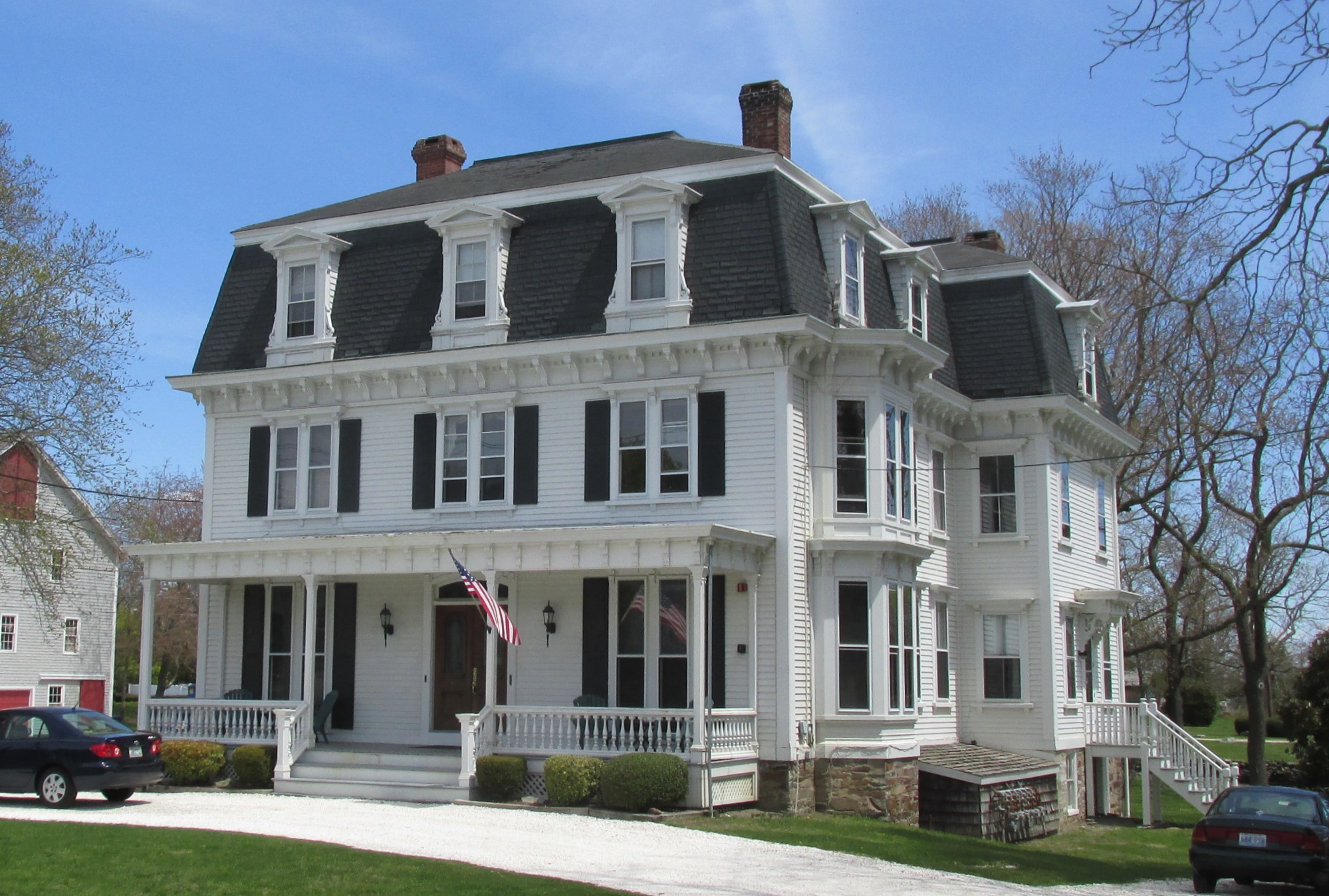
The Second Empire mansion at Borden Farm was built c. 1865

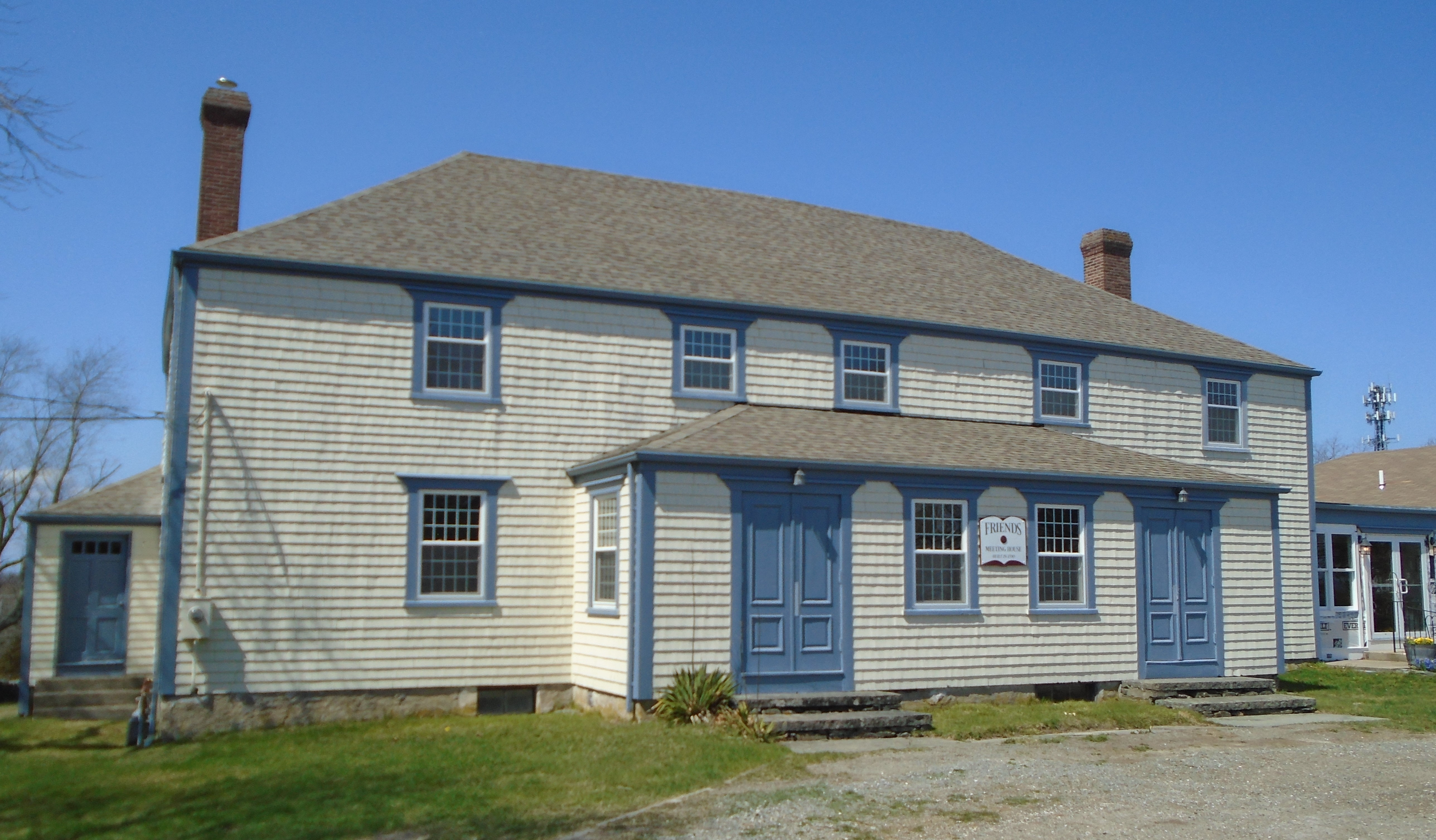
The Friends Meeting was built c. 1699–1700

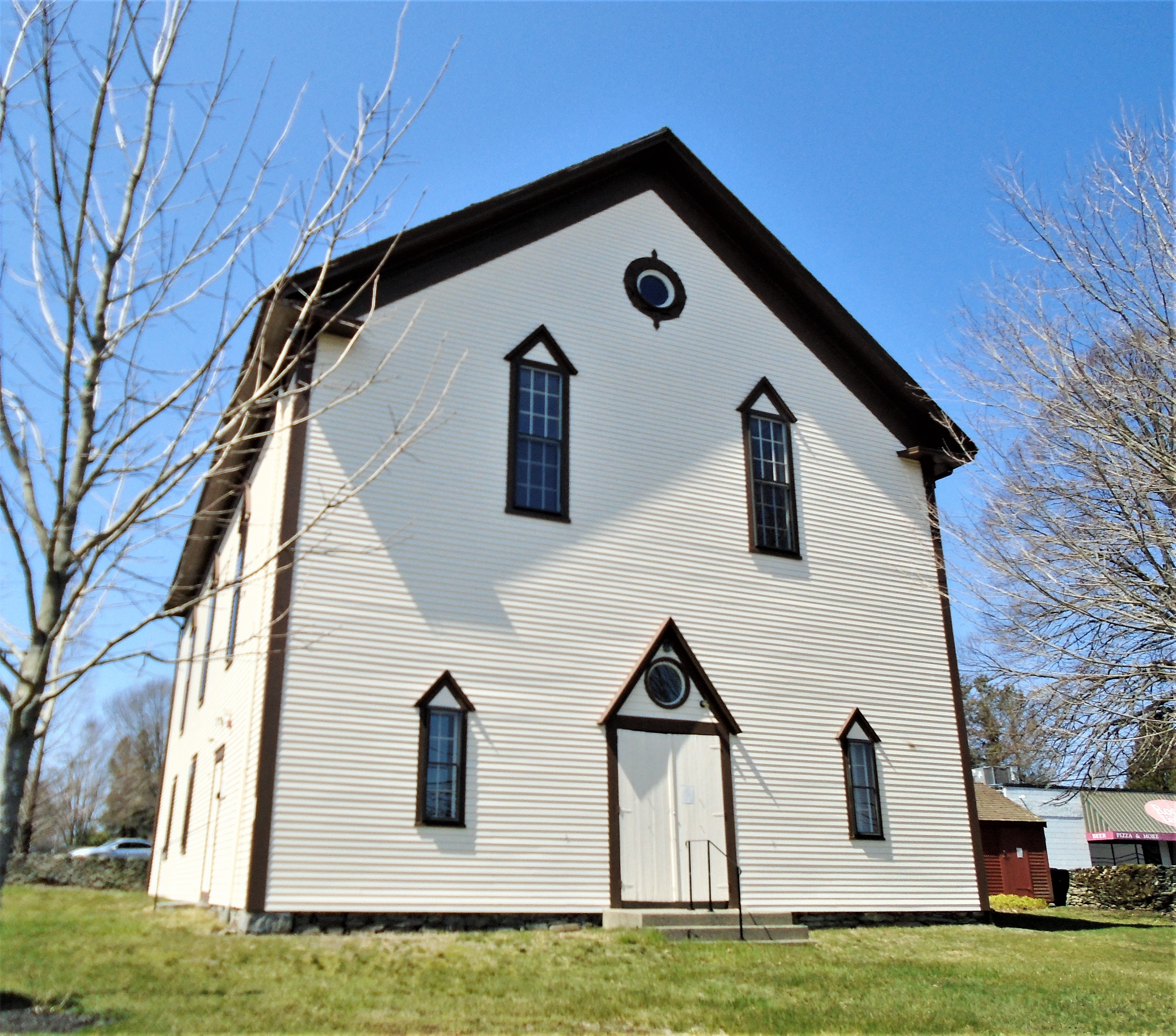
The Union Church was built in 1865

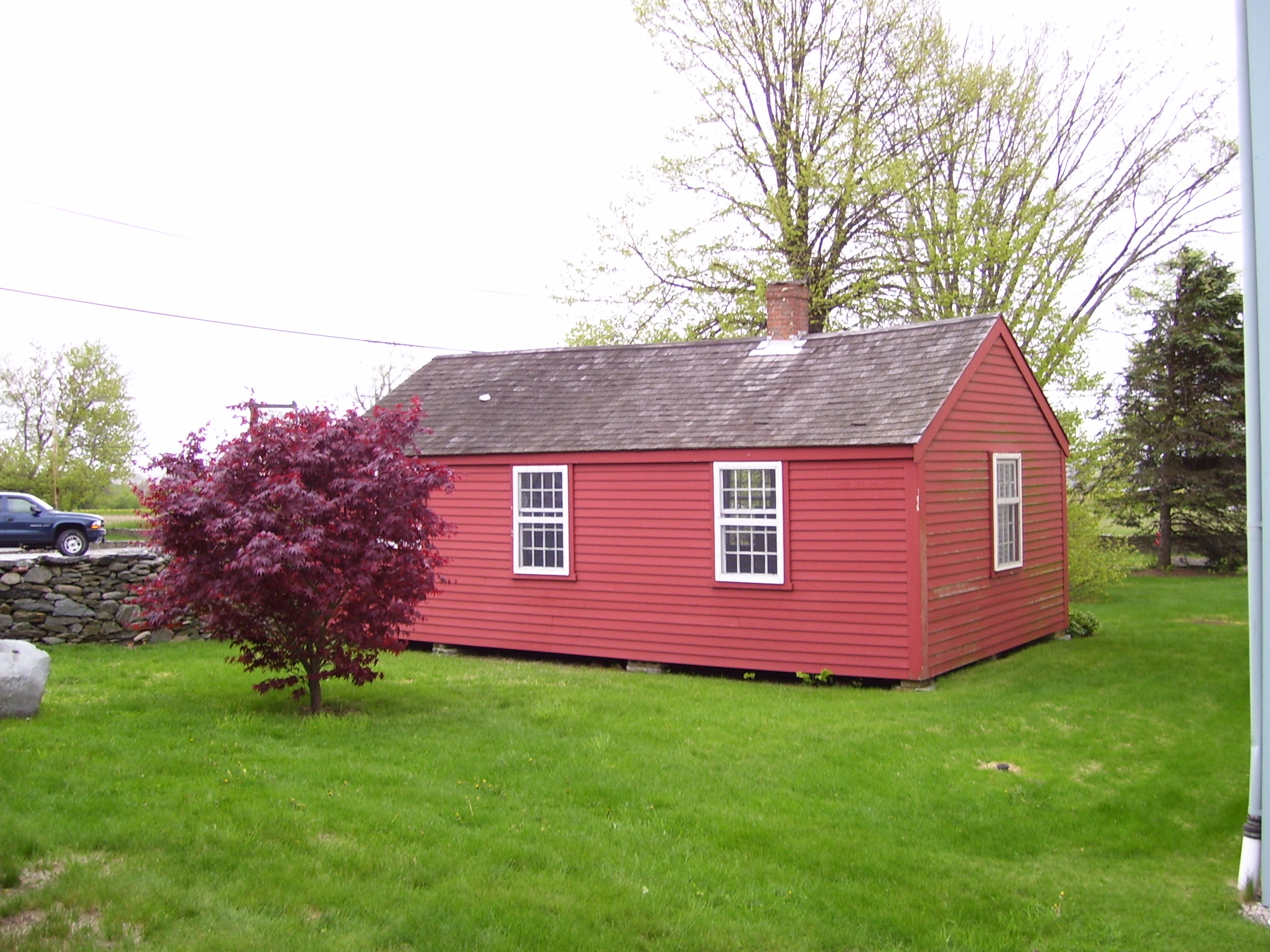
The 1725 schoolhouse owned by the Portsmouth Historical Society is one of the oldest surviving in the U.S.

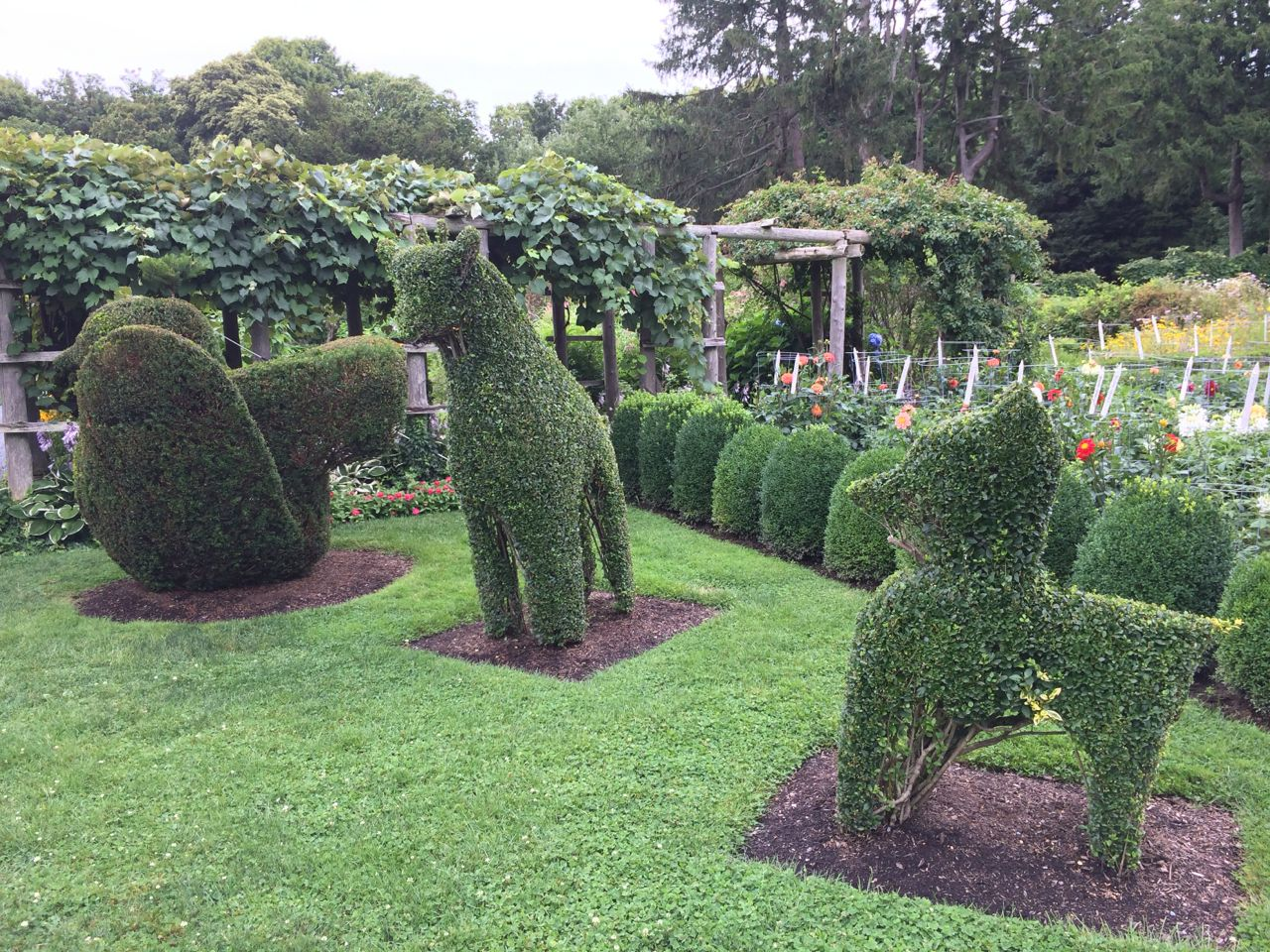
The Green Animals Topiary Garden

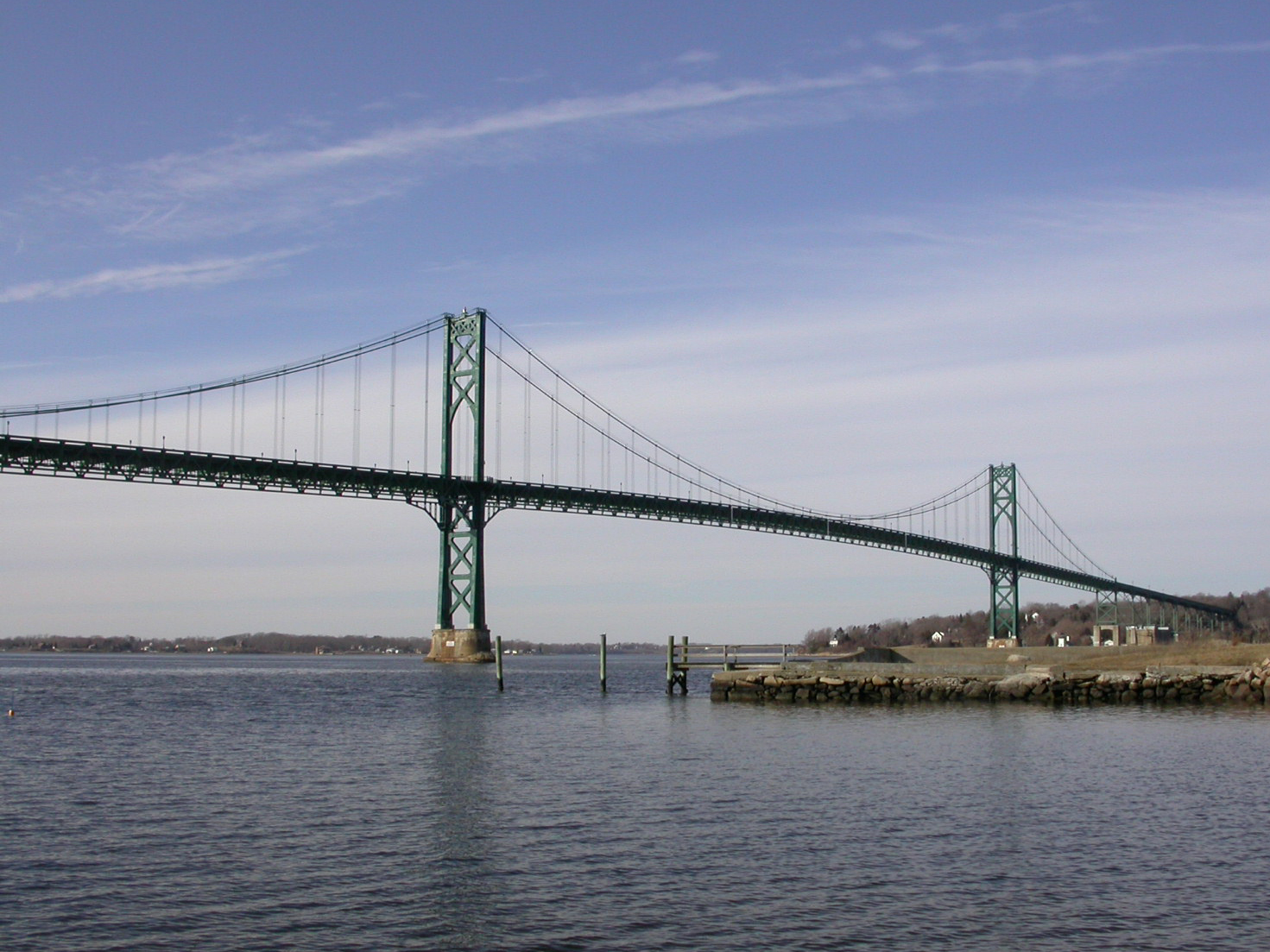
The Mount Hope Bridge, connecting Portsmouth with Bristol, Rhode Island
