= Bristol County Jail =

- U.S. National Register of Historic Places
- U.S. Historic district – Contributing property
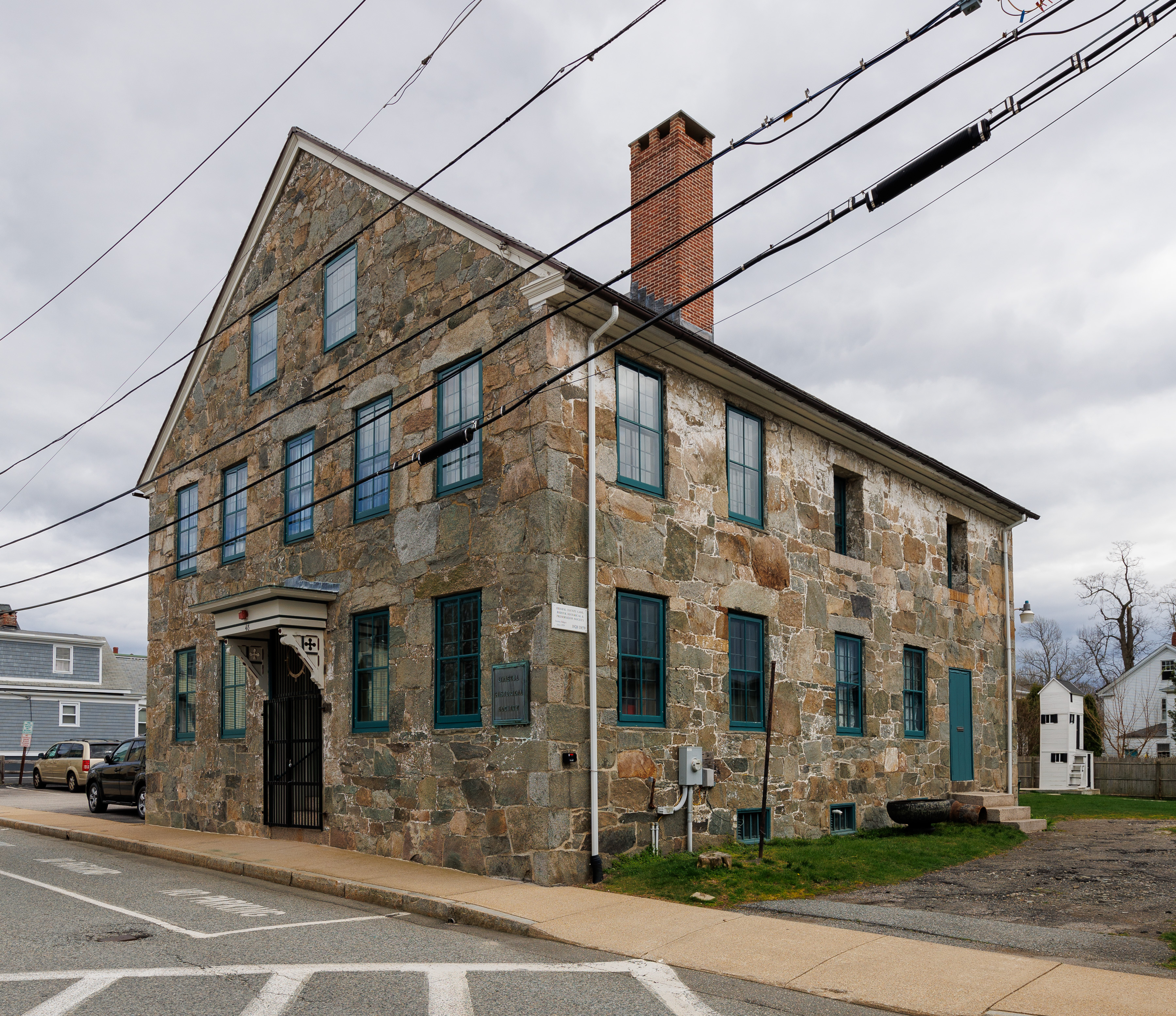

- Location within Rhode Island Location within the United States
- Location: Bristol, Rhode Island
- Coordinates: 41°40′10″N 71°16′32″W
- Built: 1828
- Part of: Bristol Waterfront Historic District (ID75000053)
- NRHP reference No.: 73000048

Significant dates
- Added to NRHP: April 24, 1973
- Designated CP: March 18, 1975

Bristol County Jail is a historic jail at 48 Court Street in Bristol, Rhode Island, and home to the Bristol Historical and Preservation Society.

The jail was built on the site of a previous jail house dating to 1792 and salvaged materials were used extensively in the new construction. The present Bristol County Jail consists of a 36.5-foot-wide (11.1 m) by 46.4-foot-long (14.1 m) center hallway in a 2 1/2-story stone structure topped with a gable roof. The jail accommodated both the inmates and the jailer's family. The first floor is believed to have been the family's parlor, dining room and kitchen on the west side and the east side the jailer's reception room, office and storage room. The second floor housed the family's bedrooms and the inmates' cells, with low, medium and maximum security cells. The maximum security cells in the southeast portion of the jail had no heat, light or sanitary facilities and were enclosed by 2-foot (0.61 m) exterior stone walls and built atop thick floor timbers supported by 2-foot-thick (0.61 m) solid brick wall and further supported by a fieldstone wall from the cellar.

In 1859, a rectangular 20-foot-wide (6.1 m) by 43.2-foot-long (13.2 m) two-story rear addition was added to common southeast wall of the jail. Made of cut granite blocks and topped with a flat roof, the addition added five cells on each of its two levels. The jail was discontinued by the State of Rhode Island in June 1957 and the Bristol Historical Society (later the Bristol Historical and Preservation Society) leased the property following a fire at the Rogers Free Library. The Bristol Historical Society removed partitions in the first floor and added new access points as part of its renovations, including the removal of the internal east chimney. However, the building retains much of its unaltered interior features, and the jail cells are used by the Society as a public exhibit. The Bristol County Jail was added to the National Register of Historic Places in 1973 and currently serves as the Historical Society headquarters.

== Design ==
The current Bristol County Jail was constructed in 1828 to replace a previous jail erected on the same site in 1792. The new structure was a 36.5-foot-wide (11.1 m) by 46.4-foot-long (14.1 m) 2 1/2-story stone structure topped with a gable roof. According to the Bristol Historical and Preservation Society the stone came from the ballast of Bristol ships. Material from the original jail was used in the new structure, including the clapboards which were split and reused as laths. The new jail and was constructed for a cost of $3,900. The front facade is five bays wide and faces north on Court Street. The facade originally featured a recessed Greek Revival entrance that was replaced with a newer door and extended by a Victorian hood. At the time of its National Register of Historic Places nomination in 1973, all the windows except one on the second story were changed from the twelve-over-eight and twelve-over twelve sashes to the two-over-two Victorian sash. In 1959, the Bristol Historical Society removed the internal east chimney on the first floor as part of renovations.

The 1828 construction features a central hall with three rooms on the east and west sides of roughly symmetrical construction with chimneys at the intersection of the front and middle rooms. The first floor chimneys were flanked by doors allowing access to the other rooms and storage on the other side. The layout and usage of the jail is not known for certain, but it is believed that the rooms to the west were used by the jailer and his family. The first room as a parlor, the middle as the dining room and the rear room as the kitchen. As part of the renovations in 1959, the Society changed the parlor to a research room, the dining room into a library and added a door to the stairway from the kitchen. The front research room and library retain the original fireplaces, pine floorboards and closets, but the connecting passage between the two rooms were changed to a bathroom. The east side of the jail is believed to have been used by the jailer for his occupational duties, with the front room as a public reception room and the middle room as his office. The rear room in the back may have been used for record or other storage. After leasing the property, the Society removed the partitions in the rooms that separated the rooms from each other.

The second floor is arranged differently from the first floor, with the rooms above the front parlor and reception room believed to have been the bedroom for the jailer and his family. The west room is described as "quite elegant in its simplicity with its original wainscot and cornice of run mouldings". The middle room may have been a low-security cell; evidence of this comes from the two windows which have iron bar markings in the granite sills. Also, the NRHP nomination states that the room, 13.2 feet (4.0 m) wide by 20.6 feet (6.3 m) long, may have been divided into two cells. The rear allows access to a small hallway and to the attic, but this was described as being a later modification.

The east front bedroom is divided in two with a partition, giving the eastern side of the building four rooms on the second floor, with the two middle rooms being used as medium-security cells. The maximum security cells were located in the back of the building, in the south-east corner. These cells are constructed of wood and walled in by stone walls and iron doors. The maximum security cells had no heat, light or bathrooms; air was only able to flow into the room through a slit in the stone wall and a peep hole in the iron door. Underneath the cells were two courses of 8 inches (0.20 m) by 8 inches (0.20 m) timbers superimposed on top of one another. These timbers are believed to have been sourced from the original 1792 jail. The timbers are supported by a 24-inch-thick (0.61 m) brick wall and by a fieldstone wall in the cellar. The exterior stone walls are 21 inches (0.53 m) thick on the front and west exterior, but are 24 inches (0.61 m) for the walls that support the maximum security cells. As part of the alterations made by the Society, the solid brick wall was removed and is now supported by steel beams.

The third floor is a single, unpartitioned room that was likely used for storage. The cellar of the jail has a chimney on the west that has several ovens, including a beehive oven, and was not partitioned except for the fieldstone foundation required to support the cells in the southeast corner.

In 1859, a rectangular 20-foot-wide (6.1 m) by 43.2-foot-long (13.2 m) two-story rear addition was added to the jail. Made of cut granite blocks and topped with a flat roof, the addition added five cells on each level and two hallways with a cast iron staircase on the left hand side. The addition was not in perfect alignment with the original common wall, and protrudes east. Access is gained from the original center hallway and heading outside to the additions' front door, a second access point from within the original building is a steel door on the common wall. The inside of the new cell block has a wood plank corridor and iron railings with tall windows, opposite the cells, that face south.

== Bristol Historical and Preservation Society ==
Founded in 1936, the Bristol Historical Society is committed to saving, collecting, and promoting historical research and interest in southern New England, with a specific focus on the town of Bristol. Originally, the Bristol Historical Society was located in the Rogers Free Library, but a fire destroyed a part of the collections on July 27, 1957. The jail, which had been abandoned by the state in June of the same year, was selected by the Society as its new home and leased from the state. In 1972, the Bristol Historical Society was renamed to the Bristol Historical and Preservation Society to reflect its preservation interests. In 1973, the Society purchased the Bristol County Jail from the state. The Society restored the jail cells through a matching grant from the National Park Service and opened the cells as a public exhibit.

== Importance ==
The Bristol County Jail was added to the National Register of Historic Places in 1973. The jail is significant as a relatively unaltered historic jail that was important to the 18th-century Bristol County. It is also significant in that it currently serves as the home of the Bristol Historical and Preservation Society. The Society also houses its library and collections in the jail and runs a small museum shop from the building.

== See also ==
- List of historical societies in Rhode Island
- List of Registered Historic Places in Rhode Island
- National Register of Historic Places listings in Bristol County, Rhode Island
