= Mount Hope Bridge =

Bridge in Mount Hope Bay, Rhode Island

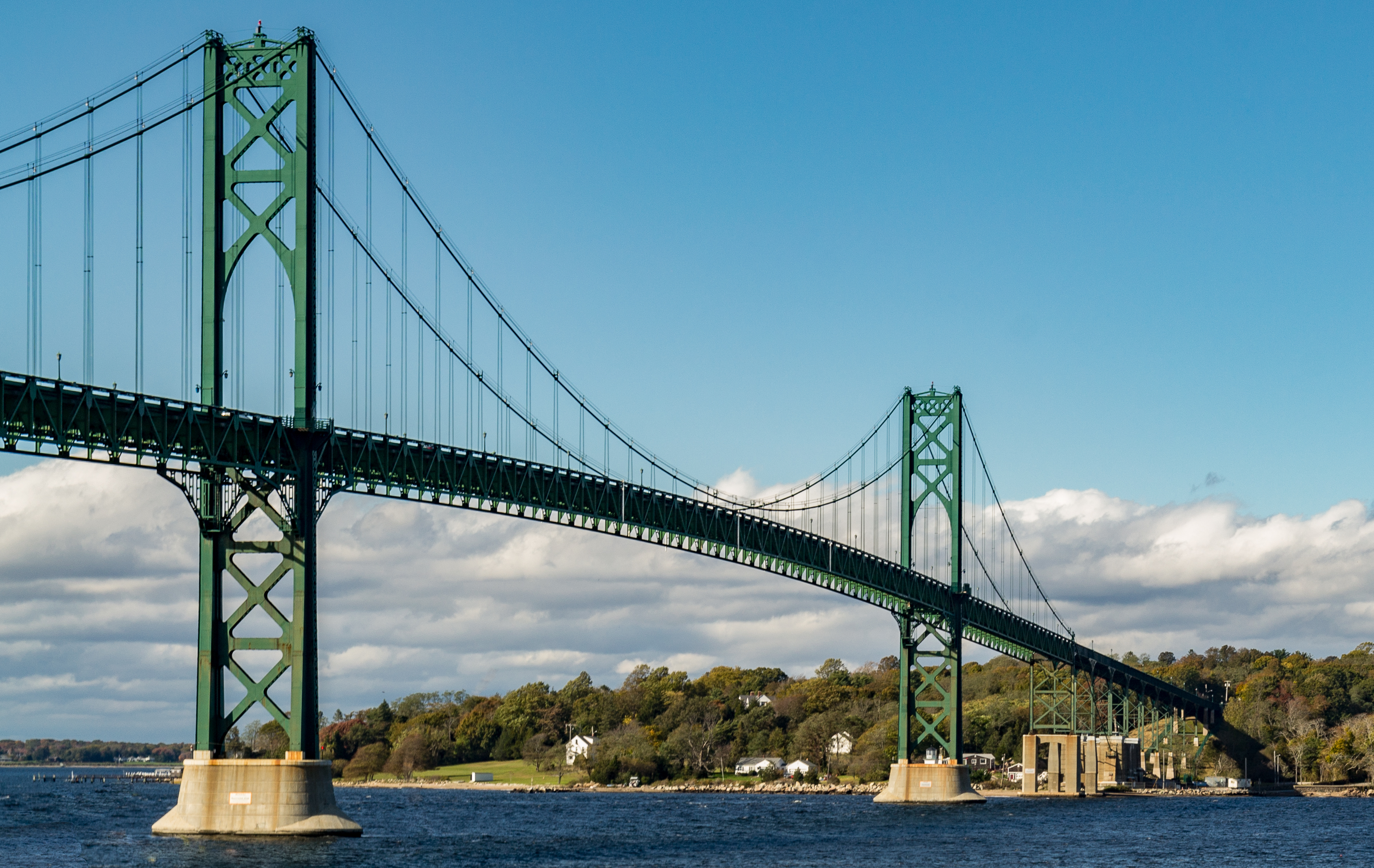
- Coordinates: 41°38′23.59″N 71°15′29.54″W
- Carries: 2 lanes of Route 114
- Crosses: Mount Hope Bay
- Locale: Portsmouth, Rhode Island and Bristol, Rhode Island
- Maintained by: Rhode Island Turnpike and Bridge Authority

Characteristics
- Design: Suspension bridge
- Total length: 6,130 ft (1,870 m)
- Width: 28 ft (8.5 m)
- Height: 285 ft (87 m)
- Longest span: 1,200 feet (366 m)
- Clearance below: 135 feet (41 m)

History
- Construction start: December 1, 1927; 98 years ago
- Opened: October 24, 1929; 97 years ago

Statistics
- Toll: Free
- Mount Hope Bridge
- U.S. National Register of Historic Places
- NRHP reference No.: 76000038
- Added to NRHP: January 31, 1976

Location
- Interactive map of Mount Hope Bridge

The Mount Hope Bridge is a two-lane suspension bridge spanning the Mount Hope Bay in eastern Rhode Island at one of the narrowest gaps in Narragansett Bay. The bridge connects the Rhode Island towns of Portsmouth and Bristol and is part of Route 114. Its towers are 285 feet (87 m) tall, the length of the main span is 1,200 feet (370 m), and it offers 135 feet (41 m) of clearance over high water. The total length of the bridge is 6,130 feet (1,870 m).

== History ==
A ferry operated between Bristol and Portsmouth before the bridge was built, and the 1855 Bristol Ferry Light still remains at the base of the bridge. The Mount Hope Bridge was proposed in 1920, and the New Hope Bridge Company was incorporated in 1927, after a few years of resistance from the Rhode Island General Assembly and with the influence of state senator and business leader William Henry Vanderbilt III. Construction began on December 1, 1927 using a design by Robinson & Steinman.

Serious structural problems were discovered four months before it was to open, forcing the contractor to disassemble and reassemble portions of the bridge.

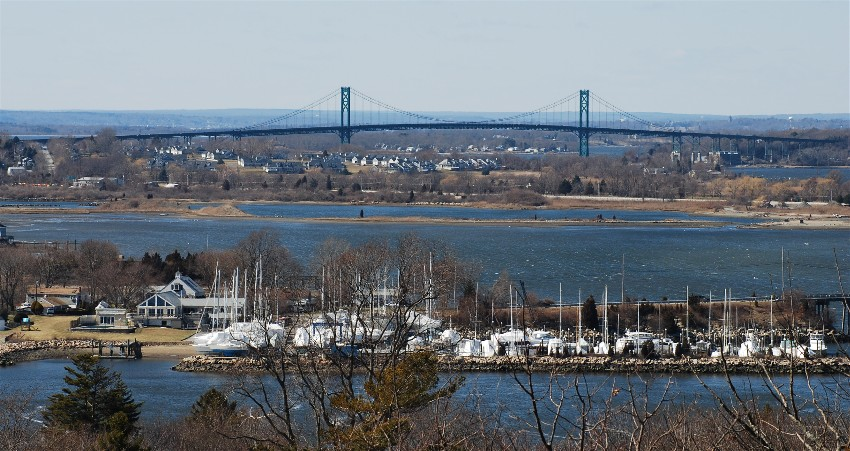
View of Mount Hope Bridge

Vanderbilt gave the opening address at the dedication ceremony on October 24, 1929, where a radio link was set up with Washington, D.C. Vice President Charles Curtis pushed the button to open the bridge, after which the U.S.S. Dallas fired its guns and flags on the main piers unfurled. The $5 million bridge was opened to traffic just five days before the Wall Street crash of 1929 occurred. It was owned by the Mount Hope Bridge Company as a private toll bridge, with the initial toll costing 60 cents one way and $1 for a round-trip. The Bridge company went bankrupt in 1931, and prominent local brewer Rudolf F. Haffenreffer acquired it in receivership.

It remained the longest suspension bridge in New England for 40 years, until the Claiborne Pell Bridge opened a few miles to the south in Newport, Rhode Island. In 1971, the Mount Hope Bridge was considered for inclusion as part of the never-built Interstate 895. This plan would have required the construction of a parallel span, but the entire I-895 plan was eventually dropped due to community opposition throughout the projected route.

The Mount Hope Bridge was listed on the National Register of Historic Places in 1976. It underwent more than $15 million in renovations between 1998 and 2004.

Bicycles were permitted on the bridge in 2007, but bicyclists were advised by the Rhode Island Department of Transportation to use extreme caution. In 2023, the Rhode Island Bridge and Turnpike Authority disputed whether bicycles were ever allowed on the Mount Hope Bridge, and told the Portsmouth Times that bicycles were only allowed during special events. Bicycling advocates disputed the RIBTA's claim, and noted to the Times that other state agencies had listed the bridge as a bicycle route. In 2023, signs were placed at the base of the bridge stating that pedestrians, bicycles, and mopeds are not permitted.

The bridge is in close proximity to the East Bay Bikeway which runs from Providence to Bristol. The bridge itself is demarcated as a continuation of that state bike route by the State of Rhode Island, although it does not contain a bicycle lane or separate bike route. It is not connected to the main bike path and is not safe for those with young children, as there is no sidewalk for the majority of the way. Signs have been posted on the bridge urging motorists to "share the road". Earlier discussions of adding a full, off-road bike route to the bridge were cancelled in April 2022. Bristol officials announced that the town would instead focus on creating a town-wide bike network, with the possibility of turning Thames Street into a shared street.

The railing along the bridge is only 35 inches (89 cm), and there is a dedicated coalition called Bridging the Gap for Safety & Healing which advocates the installation of physical safety and suicide-prevention barriers on Mount Hope Bridge, Claiborne Pell Newport Bridge, Jamestown Verrazzano Bridge, and Sakonnet River Bridge.

== Bridge tokens ==
The Mount Hope Bridge was purchased by the State of Rhode Island in 1954, with the company in receivership. The bridge's toll was eventually reduced from 60 cents to 30 cents for a one-way trip. It was finally discontinued in 1998, after calculations indicated that the toll was not high enough to cover the cost of collecting it.

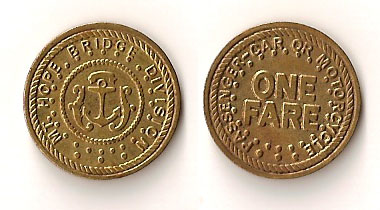
Mount Hope Bridge one fare token, front and back

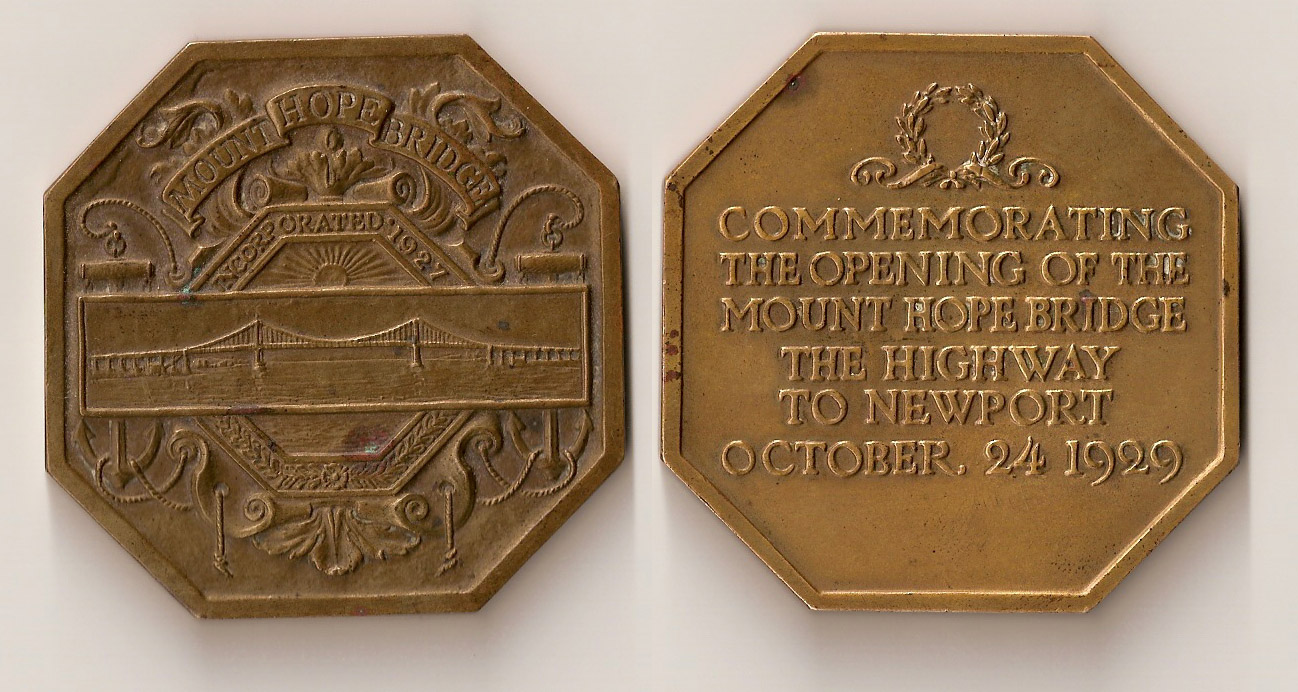
Commemorative medal (front and back) struck in 1929, honoring the opening of the Mount Hope Bridge

== See also ==
- National Register of Historic Places listings in Bristol County, Rhode Island
- List of bridges on the National Register of Historic Places in Rhode Island
