= Bristol Customshouse and Post Office =

- U.S. National Register of Historic Places
- U.S. Historic district – Contributing property
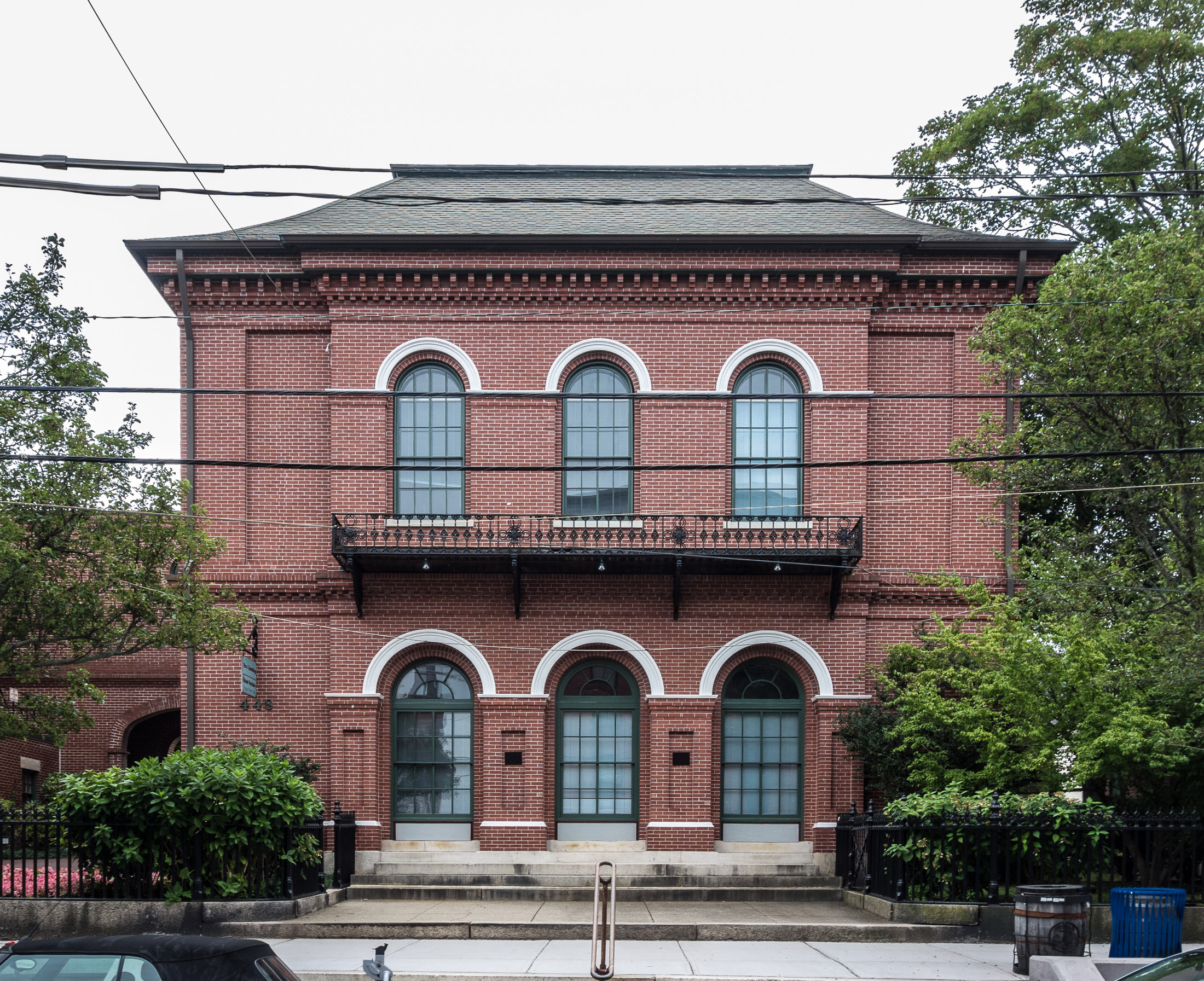
- Bristol Customshouse and Post Office in 2013

- Location within Rhode Island Location within the United States
- Location: Bristol, Rhode Island
- Coordinates: 41°39′58″N 71°16′31″W
- Built: 1858
- Architect: Ammi B. Young
- Part of: Bristol Waterfront Historic District (ID75000053)
- NRHP reference No.: 72000015

Significant dates
- Added to NRHP: May 31, 1972
- Designated CP: March 18, 1975

Bristol Customshouse and Post Office is a historic two-story rectangular Italian palazzo style brick building that was used as a post office and customshouse in Bristol, Rhode Island, United States. The land for the site was acquired for $4,400. The building was designed by Ammi B. Young and completed in 1858 for a cost of $22,135.75. The building roughly measures 46 feet (14 m) by 32 feet (9.8 m) and is constructed of deep red brick and has three arched openings on each of its sides and stories that are lined with sandstone moldings. The archways protrude from the side of the building and the center archway serves as the first floor with the adjacent archways housing large windows that are barred with iron. As it typical of the style, the second floor is more elaborate with a shallow balcony of iron supported by iron brackets and the paneling of the upper facade's surmounting entablature is elaborately decorative. The sides and rear are similar to the front facade, but include blind recesses and the molding is of a browner sandstone.

The building was abandoned in 1962 and acquired by the Young Men's Christian Association (YMCA) in 1964. The YMCA has an adjacent structure and used the building as an ante-space until 1990. Currently, the building is used as offices. The Bristol Customshouse and Post Office is historically significant as it is an example of the Italian palazzo mode of architecture. The building was added to the National Register of Historic Places in 1972.

== Design ==
The land for the site was acquired on April 19, 1856 for $4,400 and constructed in 1857 for a cost of $22,135.75. Completed in 1858 from the design by Ammi B. Young, the Bristol Customshouse and Post Office is a two-story rectangular Italian palazzo style brick building that rests upon a raised granite base. The building is about 46 feet (14 m) by 32 feet (9.8 m) and is heated by steam. The front facade is made of deep red brick that has three large arched openings on both stories and a "greyish sandstone molding outlines the arches on both floors and caps the piers which separate the first-floor arches and a decisive molding of the same material forms a belt between the two stories." The archways protrude from the side of the building and the center archway serves as the first floor with the adjacent archways housing large windows that are barred with iron. As it typical of the style, the second floor is more elaborate with a shallow balcony of iron supported by iron brackets and the paneling of the upper facade is "understated, but the surmounting entablature is heavy and elaborately decorated." The cornice as the visual top of the building and conceals the low hipped roof that is only visible from a distance. The sides and rear are similar to the front facade, but include blind recesses and the molding is of a browner sandstone.

Alterations to the building are evident in an old photograph, dated to circa 1860–1869, which shows pedimented dormers in the center of the roof, that is believed to have been an addition that has since been removed, but at an unknown time. According to Bristol, Rhode Island: The Bristol renaissance, a photo of the building dated to circa 1900 shows the pedimented dormers. A postcard that was postmarked in 1920 also shows the dormers and the adjacent YMCA building. Also present in the photograph are two chimneys on the front facade and it is evidenced that the side chimney probably arose near the front, however, only one chimney is extant in the rear. The two front chimneys were absent in a circa 1907–1913 post card. The rear chimney was described as "apparently altered" without future explanation in the National Register of Historic Places nomination.

The 1971 nomination form noted that the then-current state of the building was in a state of neglect. After passing through the vestibule, the front area served as the postal sorting rooms, office and mail boxes. In this area, the original iron columns are visible between the wood panels of the clerks' windows. The tile floors were noted to be an alteration, but the second floor stair landing likely had its original tiling remain. The second floor was accessible via cast-iron stairs with iron railings, that lead up the customs quarters that had a large room with "seven sets of iron-framed windows, with heavy iron sills and interior shutters". This room was described as "impressively large" because of its 17 feet (5.2 m) high ceilings and 8 feet (2.4 m) paneled door, the floor is made of hard wood and a "very plain marble fireplace is in one corner of the large room". The supports of the building stem from the cellar where granite piers support horizontal iron beams that hold up iron columns on the first floor.

== Use ==
The Bristol Customshouse and Post Office was used as a Post Office and Customs House, as its name implies, until it was abandoned in 1962. Records show that $1,071.75 in repairs and $68.36 for "mechanical equipment" was spent by the United States government between July 1908 and June 1909. The Young Men's Christian Association (YMCA) acquired the building in 1964, the building was attached to a YMCA swimming pool structure and was used as an ante-space until 1990. It was remodeled and currently is used as restaurants and apartments.

== Importance ==
The Bristol Customshouse and Post Office is historically significant as "an example of the rediscovery of the Italian palazzo mode of architecture after the long proliferation-of the Greek Revival." Though Young designed dozens of building for the United States Department of the Treasury, he was a master of the Greek Revival style and his designs varied throughout the years during the popularization of subsequent styles. Young also designed the United States Customshouse in Providence, Rhode Island a year prior, but its design reflected a more "classical, academic theme" in a more Tuscan style. The Bristol Customshouse and Post Office "serves as an excellent example of a style that is little represented in a town which has fine buildings of other styles and periods, and is a reminder of what was once one of the most active seaports in the northeast".

== See also ==
- National Register of Historic Places listings in Bristol County, Rhode Island
