= Fuller Rock Light =

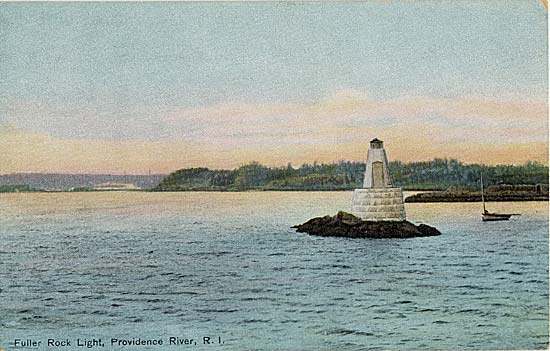
- 1914 postcard image of Fuller Rock Light
- Location: Providence River south of Kettle Point
- Coordinates: 41.7941°N 71.3797°W

Tower
- Constructed: 1872
- Foundation: granite pier
- Construction: Wood
- Automated: 1918
- Height: 14 feet (4.3 m)
- Shape: hexagonal pyramidal tower

Light
- First lit: 1872
- Deactivated: 1923
- Focal height: 28 feet (8.5 m)
- Lens: sixth order Fresnel lens
- Characteristic: Iso R 6s

The Fuller Rock Light was a lighthouse in Providence, Rhode Island. Destroyed in an explosion, it was replaced by a skeleton tower on the same foundation.

== History ==
Fuller Rock sits adjacent to the channel in the Providence River, and as shipping traffic grew in the 1800s attention was drawn to improving navigational aids for the port. An 1870 congressional appropriation provided for three lights in the area: one for Fuller Rock, another further upstream at Sassafras Point, and a third downstream at Pomham Rocks. The last reused the design of the Colchester Reef Light in Vermont, but the other two were built to a much simpler plan for a short wooden tower resting on a granite pier. These lights lacked dwellings; the keeper lived on shore and had to approach the lights by boat in order to tend them. Funds were provided for a keeper's dwelling but property nearby could not be secured.

Maintenance of the structure was a problem from early on, and 1879 the Lighthouse Board reported that the tower showed "considerable evidence of decay." A request to appropriate funds to replace it with an iron tower, however, was not heeded. In 1889 some repairs to the foundation were made including repointing of the pier and dumping of additional riprap at its base.

Staffing this light was difficult and at least three keepers served no more than a year, so it was an early candidate for automation. In 1918 it was converted to an automated acetylene beacon, with responsibility for its maintenance passing to the Pomham Rocks keeper. This beacon would prove its undoing. On February 4, 1923, the tender Pansy brought a crew to replace the acetylene tanks. In the course of the work the old tanks exploded, injuring five of the men, though with no fatalities. The tower, however, was completely destroyed. A skeleton tower was erected on the old pier; this was replaced in 1997 with a shorter tower on the same foundation.
