= Sassafras Point Light =

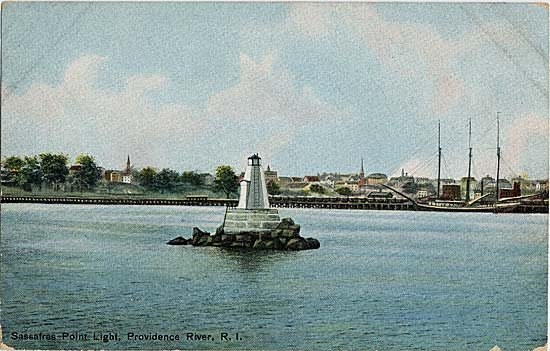
- postcard image of light
- Location: Providence River off Sassafras Point
- Coordinates: 41°48′1.55″N 71°23′31.41″W

Tower
- Foundation: granite pier
- Construction: Wood
- Height: 14 feet (4.3 m)
- Shape: hexagonal pyramidal tower

Light
- First lit: 1872
- Deactivated: 1912
- Focal height: 25 feet (7.6 m)
- Lens: sixth order Fresnel lens
- Characteristic: F R

The Sassafras Point Light was a lighthouse that stood in the Providence, Rhode Island harbor approaches. It was deactivated in 1912 and no longer exists.

== History ==
This light was paired with the Fuller Rock Light from the beginning: it was approved in the same bill, built according to the same design, and tended by the same keepers. Sassafras Point jutted out north into the Providence River, and the light thus marked this obstruction. The short wooden pyramidal tower sat upon a granite pier and was provided with a sixth order Fresnel lens; it was first lit in 1872.

This light was unmanned and was visited from shore by boat; a keeper's dwelling was originally planned but although funds were appropriated in 1874 the lighthouse service was never able to acquire a property on which to erect a house, and keepers lived in their own homes in town. Staffing was difficult due to the low pay.

The light was removed in 1912 as part of a channel-widening project.
