= Bristol Waterfront Historic District =

Historic district in Rhode Island, United States

Coordinates: 41.669482°N 71.27248°W

- U.S. National Register of Historic Places
- U.S. Historic district
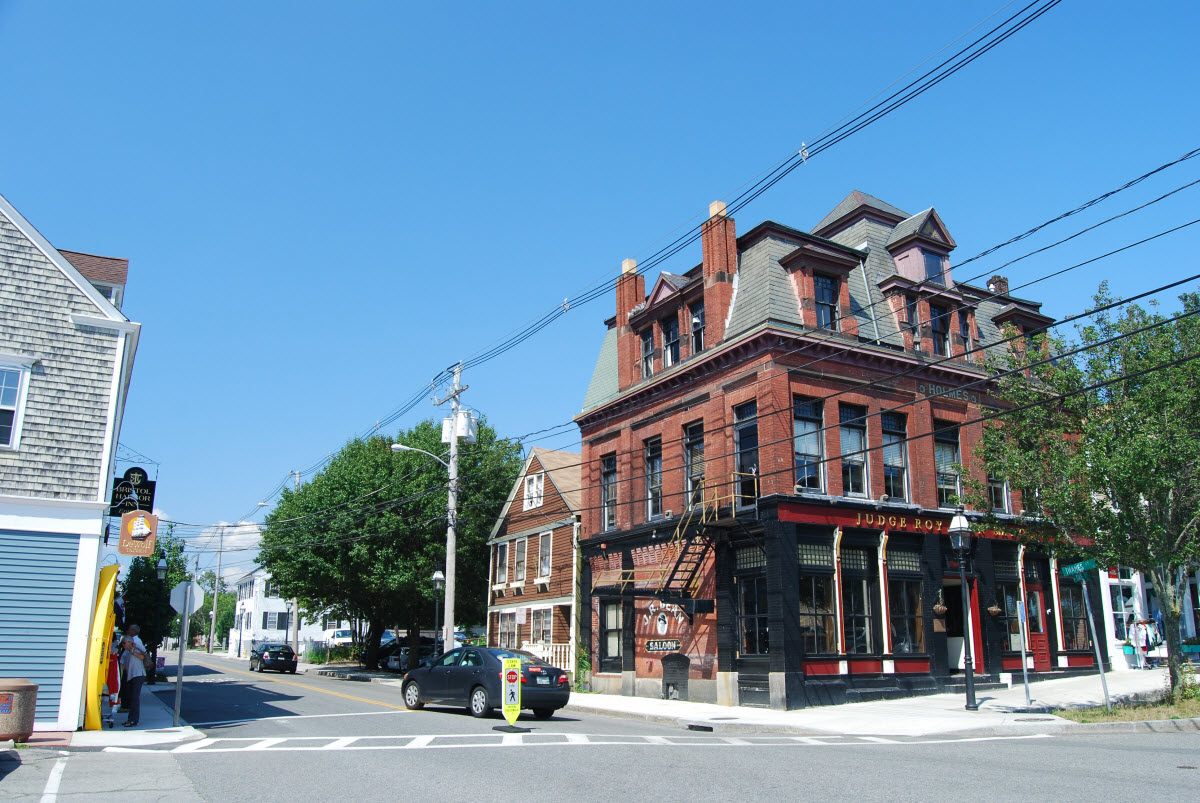
- Thames Street

- Location within Rhode Island Location within the United States
- Location: Bristol, Rhode Island
- Built: 1680
- Architect: Multiple
- Architectural style: Mid 19th Century Revival, Late 19th And 20th Century Revivals, Late Victorian
- NRHP reference No.: 75000053
- Added to NRHP: March 18, 1975

The Bristol Waterfront Historic District is a historic district encompassing the original heart of Bristol, Rhode Island, which was laid out in 1680 by the town's original proprietors. It stretches from Bristol Harbor to the east side of Wood St., as far north as Washington Street, and south to Walker Cove. The district's principal areas of importance are the waterfront area on the west side, and the Town Common, part of the original layout, which forms the civic heart of the town. It is one of the few planned communities in the state, and the only one of such great age. The district features residential, civic, and commercial architecture encompassing most of its more than three centuries of existence. Its 19th-century architecture is particularly strong in examples of the work of native son Russell Warren.

The district was listed on the National Register of Historic Places in 1975. Major buildings in the district which are separately listed on the National Register include the Bristol County Jail, Bristol County Courthouse, and the Bristol Customshouse and Post Office.

== See also ==
- National Register of Historic Places listings in Bristol County, Rhode Island
