= Gould Island (Rhode Island) =

Island in Rhode Island

Coordinates: 41°32′0.87″N 71°20′39.99″W

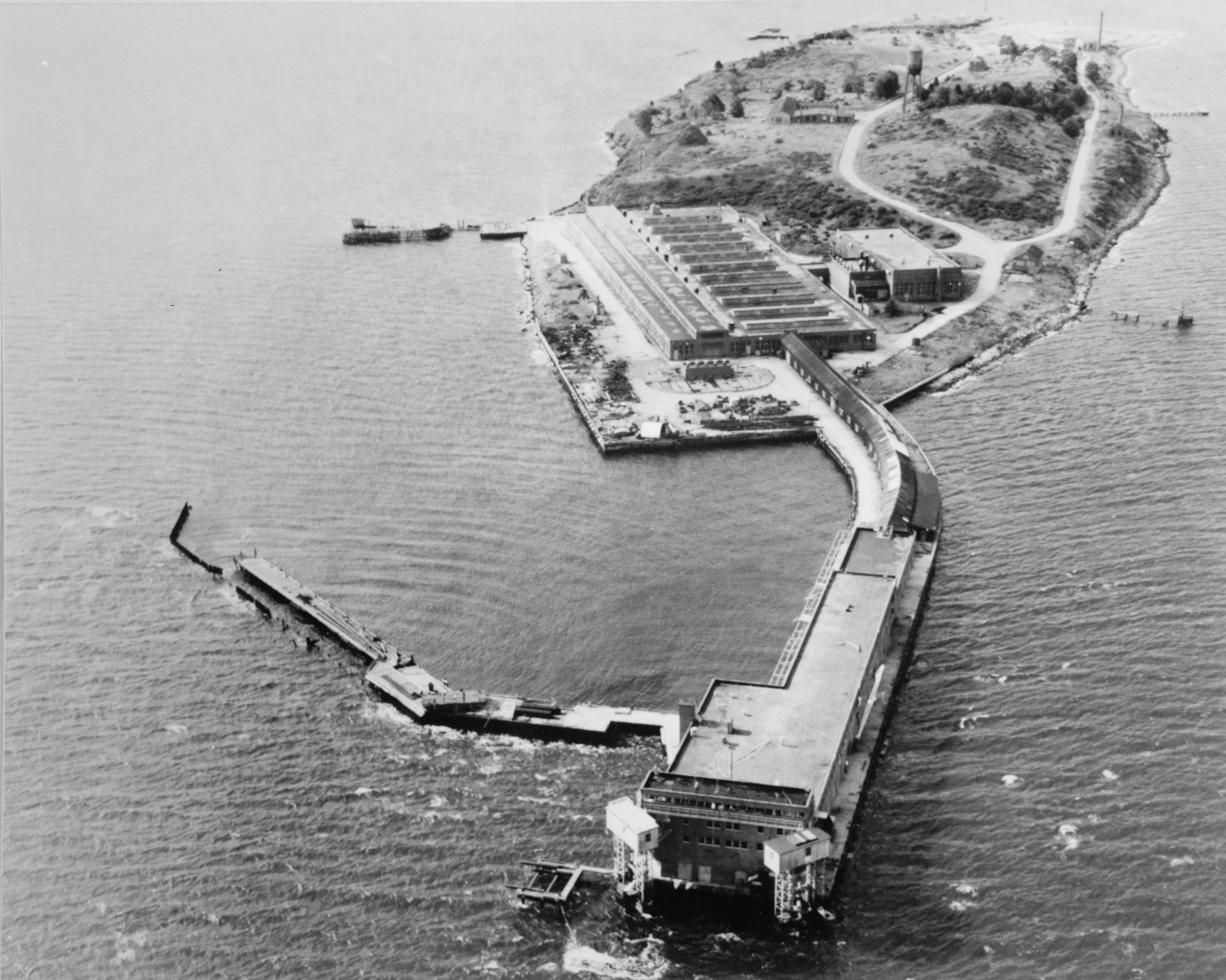
Aerial view of Gould Island in 1973

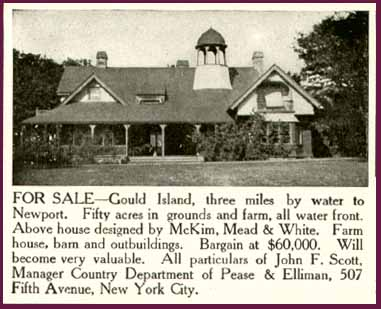
A 1907 advertisement for the sale of Gould Island and a McKim, Mead and White building

Gould Island lies east of Conanicut Island in Narragansett Bay in Rhode Island. It is a part of the town of Jamestown and has a land area of 55.3 acres (22.4 ha).

== History ==
The Narragansett people named the island "Aquopimokuk", and Colonist Thomas Gould purchased it from them in 1657. Gould sold the island to Thomas Cranston, and later owners included the Carr family and Joseph Wanton, Jr., who lost the property for having Loyalist sympathies during the American Revolution. British naval leader Captain Wallace constructed a military fort on the island called "Owl's Nest" in 1778 during the American Revolution. In 1803, Caleb Gardner purchased the forfeited island. It remained privately owned until the early twentieth century.

A lighthouse was built on the island in 1889 which was demolished in 1960. Richard L. Howell purchased the island in 1909, and his daughter and son-in-law Percy D. Haughton inherited it along with the McKim, Mead, and White house. Percy Haughton was Harvard College's football coach, and he used the island for training the football team.

In 1919, the U.S. Navy requisitioned the entire island from the Haughton family to expand its nearby torpedo station on Goat Island. They constructed an airbase with hangars and a seaplane landing site for naval torpedo planes. The airfield was discontinued in the 1950s. As of 2009, the State of Rhode Island owns part of the island as a wildlife sanctuary, while the Navy and Naval Undersea Warfare Center still own and utilize the remainder of it.
