= Wickford Harbor Light =

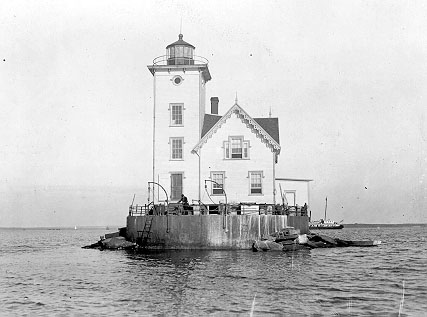
- Location: Wickford, Rhode Island
- Coordinates: 41°34′24.37″N 71°26′10.20″W

Tower
- Constructed: 1882
- Height: 4.5 m (15 ft)
- Shape: Original: square tower and attached dwelling Current: skeleton tower
- Markings: Original: white on red iron pier, lantern, black Current: SG daymark on black tower
- Fog signal: Bell, every 20s Current: none

Light
- First lit: 1930 (current skeleton tower)
- Deactivated: 1930
- Focal height: 20 feet (6.1 m)
- Lens: 5th order Fresnel lens (original), aerobeacon (current)
- Range: 6 nautical miles (11 km; 6.9 mi)
- Characteristic: FI G 6s

Wickford Harbor Light, now officially Wickford Harbor Light 1, was built in 1882 as a square wood tower attached to a 1 1/2-story keeper's dwelling on Old Gay Rock on the south side of the entrance to Wickford Harbor on the west side of Narragansett Bay. It was deactivated and torn down in 1930 and replaced with the current black steel skeleton tower.
