= Hog Island Shoal Light =

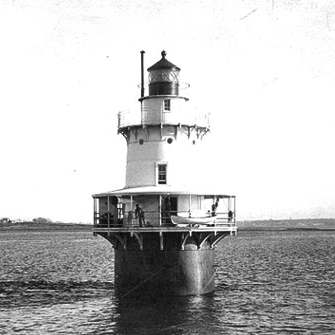
- Location: Portsmouth, Rhode Island
- Coordinates: 41°37′56.3″N 71°16′23.6″W

Tower
- Constructed: 1886
- Foundation: Cast iron & granite caisson
- Construction: Cast iron
- Automated: 1964
- Height: 60 feet (18 m)
- Shape: Sparkplug lighthouse
- Markings: White conical tower on black cylindrical pier
- Heritage: National Register of Historic Places listed place
- Fog signal: Horn, 2 blasts every 30 seconds VHF radio activated

Light
- First lit: 1901
- Focal height: 54 feet (16 m)
- Lens: 5th order Fresnel lens 1901 (original), 9.8 inches (250 mm) (current)
- Range: 12 nautical miles (22 km; 14 mi)
- Characteristic: Isophase White, 6 seconds
- Hog Island Shoal Lighthouse
- U.S. National Register of Historic Places
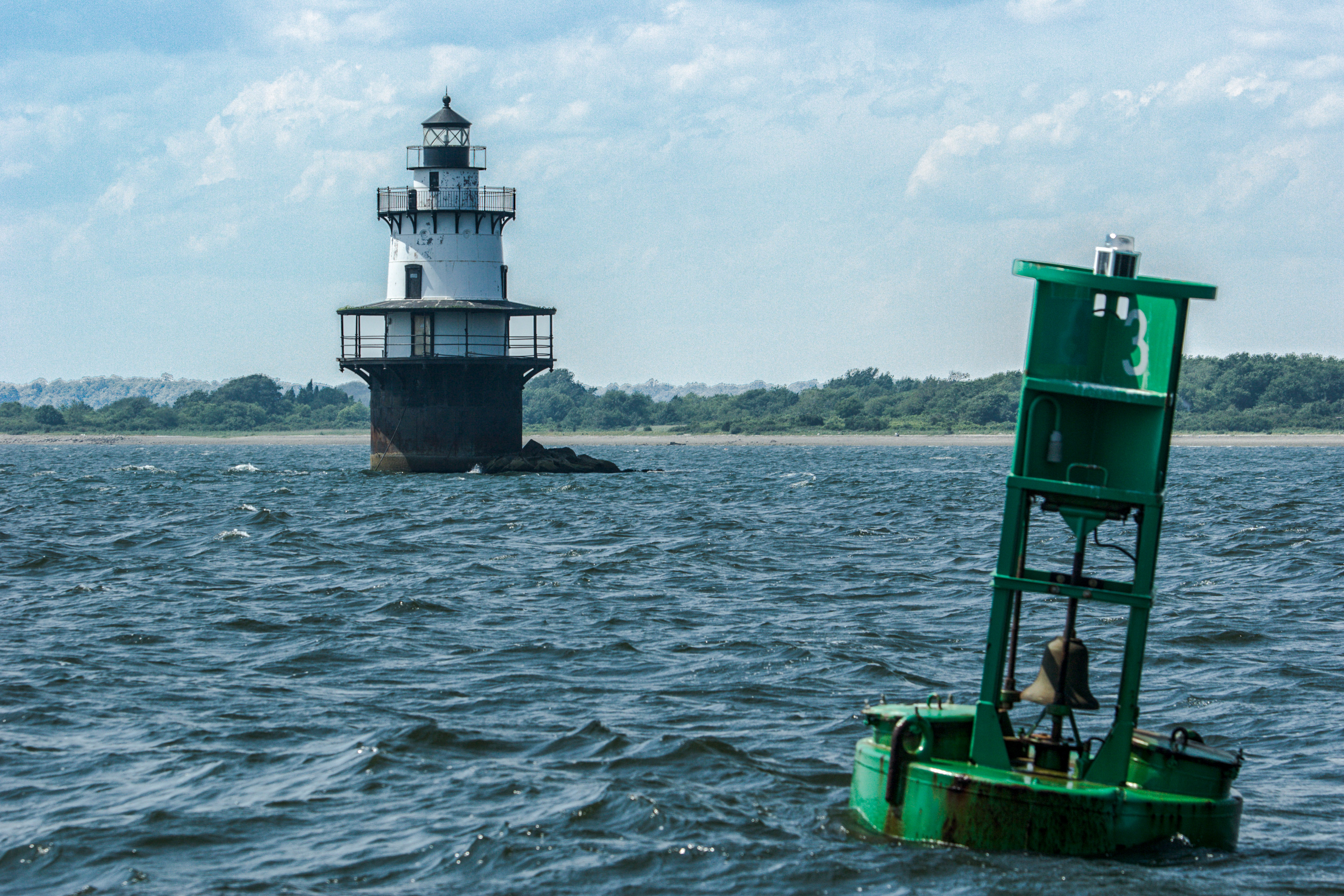
- Hog Island Shoal Lighthouse as seen from a boat
- Built: 1901
- MPS: Lighthouses of Rhode Island TR
- NRHP reference No.: 88000282
- Added to NRHP: March 30, 1988

Hog Island Shoal Light, built in 1901, is a sparkplug lighthouse on a shoal off of Hog Island, Rhode Island. It is located about 600 feet (180 m) southeast of the island, at the entrance to Mount Hope Bay. It stands on a circular concrete Foundation (engineering) set in about 10 feet (3.0 m) of water, and rising about 6 feet (1.8 m) above the water line. It was built to replace a light ship, and was the last light station formally established in the state. The lighthouse was automated in 1964. In 1988 it was added to the National Register of Historic Places. In 2006 the lighthouse was auctioned by the GSA (General Services Administration) as government surplus to a private buyer.

== See also ==
- National Register of Historic Places listings in Newport County, Rhode Island
