= Bristol Ferry Light =

- Bristol Ferry Lighthouse
- U.S. National Register of Historic Places
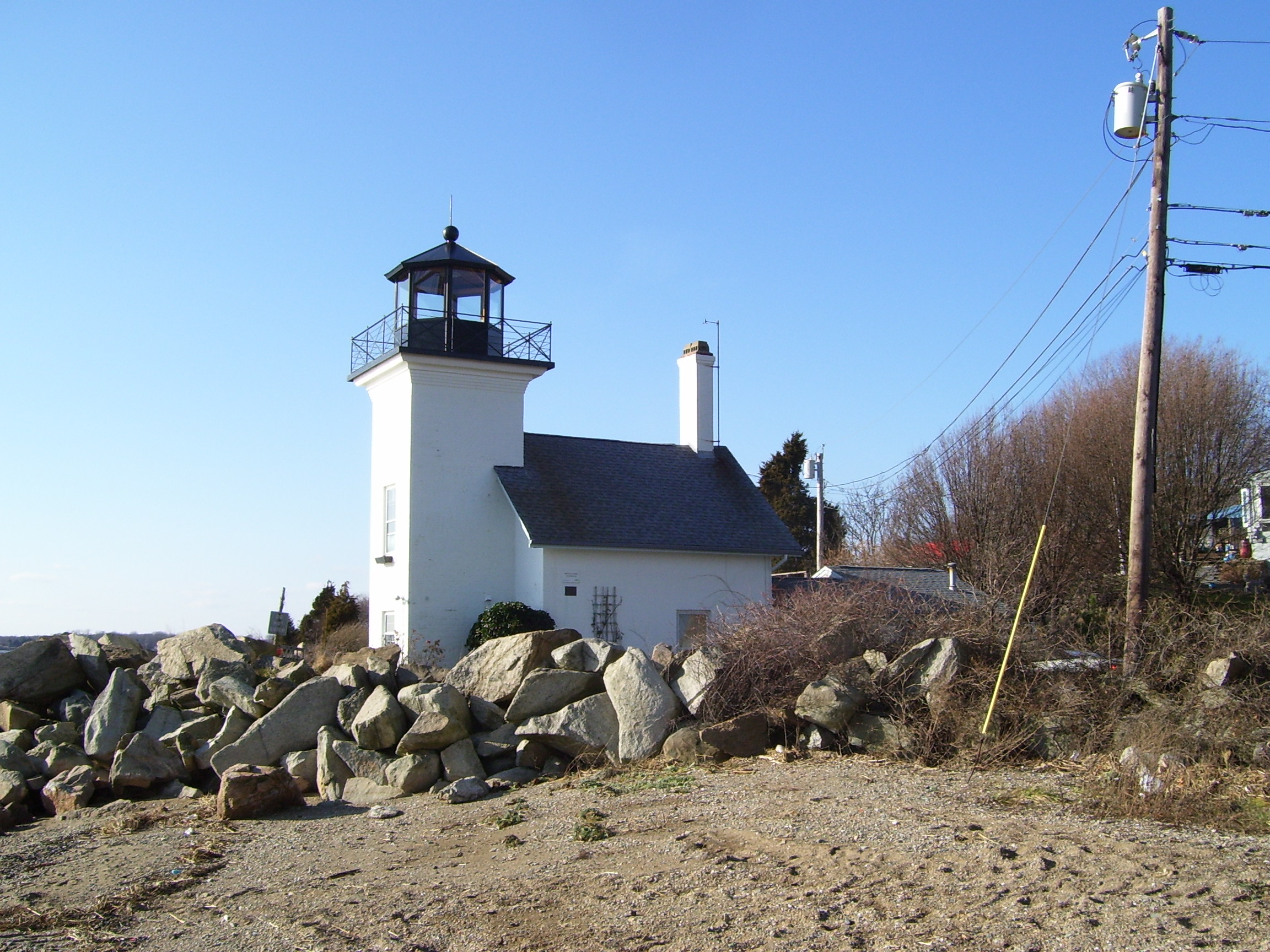

- Location within Rhode Island Location within the United States
- Location: Bristol, Rhode Island
- Coordinates: 41°38′35″N 71°15′37″W
- Built: 1855
- MPS: Lighthouses of Rhode Island TR
- NRHP reference No.: 87001696
- Added to NRHP: February 25, 1988

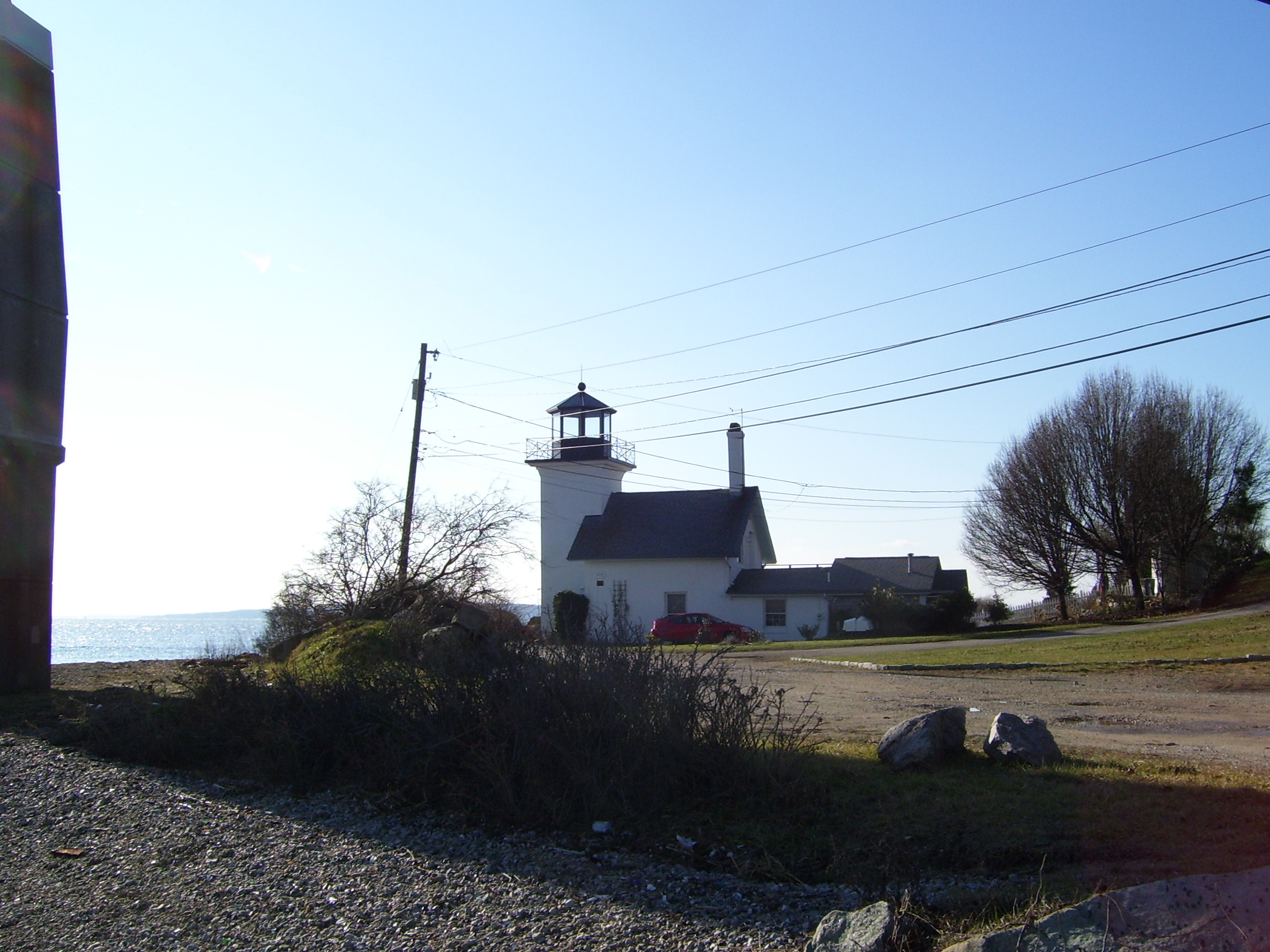
Bristol Ferry Light with the base of the Mount Hope Bridge on left

Bristol Ferry Light is a historic lighthouse in Bristol, Rhode Island. It is located on the shores of Narragansett Bay at Bristol Point, the northern land point of Mount Hope Bay at the base of the Mount Hope Bridge.

The two-story square brick lighthouse was built in 1855, along with an attached 1 1/2-story brick keeper's house. Its use was discontinued in 1927 with the construction of the Mount Hope Bridge, and a replacement automated beacon across Ferry Road. A ferry operated between Bristol and Aquidneck Island before the bridge was built, and the light assisted the ferry service. The Bristol Ferry Lighthouse was added to the National Register of Historic Places in 1988, at which time it was a private residence.

== See also ==
- National Register of Historic Places listings in Bristol County, Rhode Island
