= Hope and Anchor =

Hope and Anchor may refer to:

- Hope and Anchor, Hammersmith, a pub in London, England
- Hope and Anchor, Islington, a pub in London
- Hope and Anchor, Welham Green, a pub in Hertfordshire, England
- Hope and Anchor Tavern, a pub in Hobart, Tasmania
- Seal of Rhode Island, which features the hope and anchor motif
