= Colony of Rhode Island and Providence Plantations =

British colony in North America (1636–1776)

- 1636–1776
- Flag Seal

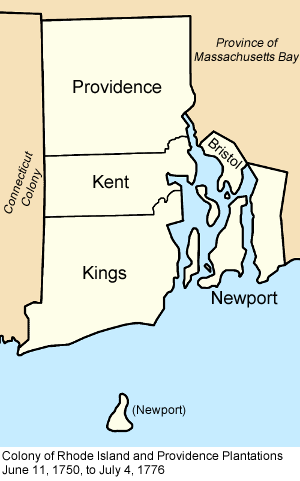
- Capital: Providence, Newport
- Languages: English, Narragansett, Massachusett
- Government: Self-governing colony (1636–1651; 1653–1776); Proprietary colony (1651–1653)
- Governor
  - 1636–1644: Roger Williams
  - 1644–1775: (list)
  - 1775–1776: Nicholas Cooke
- Legislature: General Assembly
  - Upper House (de facto): Council of Assistants
  - Lower House (de facto): House of Deputies
- Historical era: British colonization of the Americas; Puritan migration to New England (1620–1640)
  - Established: 1636
  - Foundation: 1637
  - Patent for Settlement: 1643-1644
  - Coddington Commission: 1651–1653
  - Royal Charter: 1663
  - Part of the Dominion of New England: 1686–1689
  - Resumption of Royal Charter: 1688
  - Disestablished: 1776

Area
  - Total: 4,000 km^{2} (1,500 sq mi)
- Currency: Rhode Island pound
| Preceded by | Succeeded by |
| Narragansett; Wampanoag | Rhode Island; Dominion of New England |
- Today part of: Rhode Island

The Colony of Rhode Island and Providence Plantations was an English colony on the eastern coast of North America, founded in 1636 on former land of the Narragansett tribe by Puritan minister Roger Williams, at a settlement he originally called Providence Plantations, after his exile from the Massachusetts Bay Colony. Joined by three other settlements soon founded on Narragansett Bay, the colony became a haven for religious dissenters and was known for its commitment to religious freedom and self-governance.

The four Narragansett Bay settlements created an official confederacy through a charter under the Patent of 1643–1644, granted by the English Parliament. It received a more comprehensive Royal Charter in 1663 from King Charles II, which established its government and guaranteed its religious liberties. Except for a three year interruption in 1686, Rhode Island continued as a self-governing colony until 1776, when it declared independence from Great Britain during the American Revolution, becoming the State of Rhode Island and Providence Plantations.

== First settlements ==
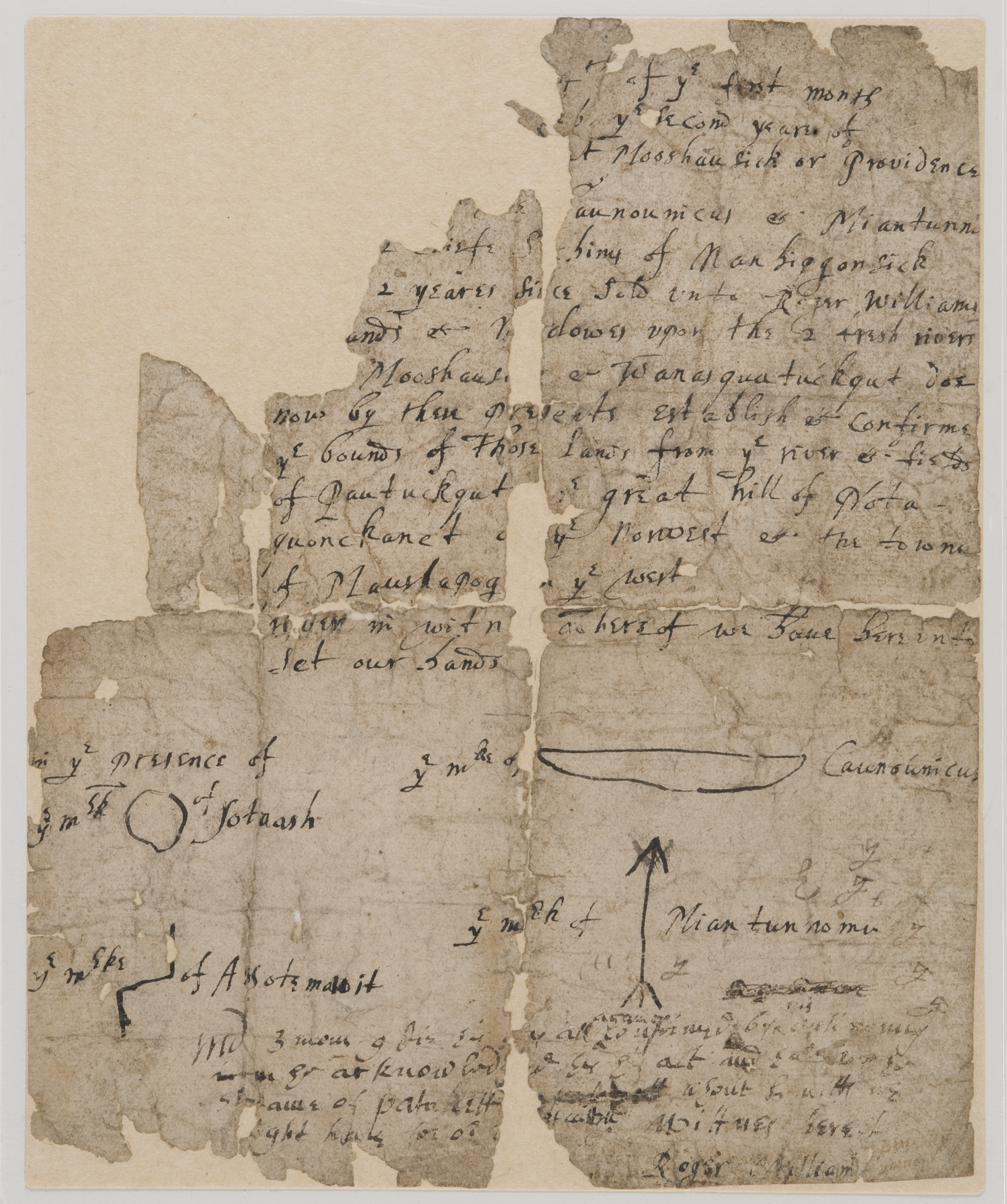
The original 1636 deed to Providence signed by Chief Canonicus

The land was first inhabited by the Narragansett Indians, which led to the name of the town of Narragansett, Rhode Island. European settlement began around 1622 with a trading post at Sowams, now the town of Warren, Rhode Island.

The first four European settlements were at Providence, Portsmouth, Newport and Warwick.

=== Roger Williams—Providence ===
Roger Williams was a Puritan theologian and linguist. Strongly believing in the separation of church and state, Williams was a separating Puritan who considered the Church of England irredeemably corrupt – leading to religious persecution against him from the non-separatist leadership of the Massachusetts Bay Colony, which exiled him. Williams moved to a nearby location within the English possessions in the Americas, on the shores of Narragansett Bay, founding the settlement of Providence Plantations in 1636. He sought refuge among the Narragansetts and negotiated with sachems Canonicus and Miantonomoh for land, agreeing to trade goods in exchange. He named the settlement Providence Plantations to express his gratitude for divine guidance.

Following his convictions, Williams and his fellow settlers agreed on an egalitarian constitution providing for majority rule "in civil things" with liberty of conscience on spiritual matters. He named three islands in the Narragansett Bay after Christian virtues: Patience, Prudence, and Hope Islands.

=== Island settlements—Portsmouth and Newport ===
In 1637, another group of Massachusetts dissenters settled on Aquidneck Island, which was called Rhode Island at the time. They established a settlement called Pocasset at the northern end of the island. The group included William Coddington, John Clarke, and Anne and William Hutchinson, among others. That settlement, however, quickly split into two separate settlements. Samuel Gorton and others remained to establish the settlement of Portsmouth in 1638, while Coddington and Clarke established nearby Newport in 1639. Both settlements were situated on Rhode Island.

=== Shawomet Purchase—Warwick ===
The second settlement on the mainland was Samuel Gorton's Shawomet Purchase from the Narragansetts in 1642. As soon as he settled there, however, the Massachusetts Bay authorities laid claim to his territory and acted to enforce their claim. Gorton traveled to London to enlist the help of Robert Rich, 2nd Earl of Warwick, head of the Commission for Foreign Plantations. He returned in 1648 with a letter from Rich ordering Massachusetts to cease molesting him and his people. In gratitude, he changed the name of Shawomet Plantation to Warwick.

== Coddington Charter attempt ==
In 1651, William Coddington obtained a separate charter from England setting up the Coddington Commission, which made him life governor of the islands of Rhode Island and Conanicut in a federation with Connecticut Colony and Massachusetts Bay Colony.

Protest, open rebellion, and a further petition to Oliver Cromwell in London led to the reinstatement of the original 1643 Patent.

== 1663 Royal Charter ==
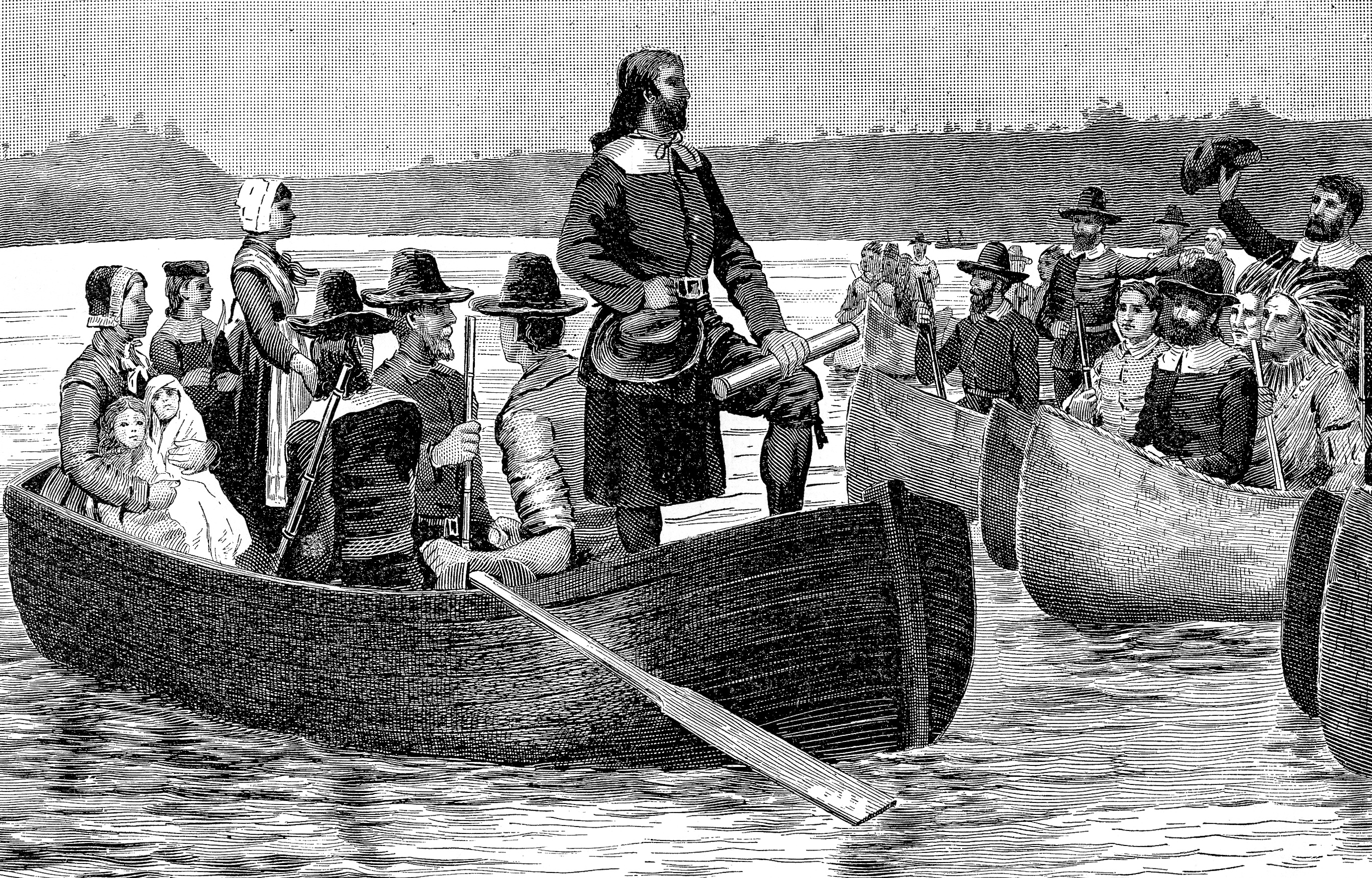
Roger Williams returning with the royal charter

Following the 1660 restoration of royal rule in England, it was necessary to gain a Royal Charter from King Charles II. Charles was a Catholic sympathizer in staunchly Protestant England, and he approved of the colony's promise of religious freedom. He granted the request with the Royal Charter of 1663, uniting the four settlements together into the English Colony of Rhode-Island and Providence Plantations.

In the following years, many persecuted groups settled in the colony, notably Quakers and Jews. The Rhode Island colony was very progressive for the time, passing laws abolishing witchcraft trials, imprisonment for debt, and most capital punishment. The colony also passed the first anti-slavery law in America on May 18, 1652, though the practice remained widespread in Rhode Island and there exists no evidence that the legislation was ever enforced.

== King Philip's War ==
Rhode Island remained at peace with the Narragansett Indians, but the relationship was more strained between other New England colonies and certain tribes. This situation frequently led to bloodshed, despite attempts by the Rhode Island leadership to broker peace.

During King Philip's War (1675–1676), Colonist and Indian fighting regularly violated Rhode Island's neutrality. The war's largest battle occurred in Rhode Island on December 19, 1675 when a force of Massachusetts, Connecticut, and Plymouth militia under General Josiah Winslow invaded and destroyed the fortified Narragansett village in the Great Swamp.

The Narragansetts also invaded and burned several towns in Rhode Island, including Providence. Roger Williams had known both Metacom (Philip) and Canonchet since they were children. He was aware of the tribe's activities and promptly sent letters informing the Governor of Massachusetts of enemy movements. Providence Plantations made some efforts at fortifying the town, and Williams even started training recruits for protection. In one of the final actions of the war, troops from Connecticut killed Philip in Mount Hope, Rhode Island.

== Dominion of New England ==
In the 1680s, Charles II sought to centralize administration of the English colonies and to more closely control their trade. The Navigation Acts passed in the 1660s were widely disliked, since merchants often found themselves trapped and at odds with the rules. However, many colonial governments refused to enforce the acts, Massachusetts principally among them, and Massachusetts took matters one step further by obstructing the activities of the Crown agents. Charles' successor James II introduced the Dominion of New England in 1686 as a means to accomplish these goals. Under its provisional president Joseph Dudley, the disputed "King's Country" (now Washington County) was brought into the dominion, and the rest of the colony was brought under dominion control by Governor Edmund Andros. The rule of Andros was extremely unpopular, especially in Massachusetts. The 1688 Glorious Revolution deposed James II and brought William III and Mary II to the English throne; Massachusetts authorities conspired in April 1689 to have Andros arrested and sent back to England. With this event, the dominion collapsed and Rhode Island resumed its previous government.

The bedrock of the economy continued to be fishing and agriculture, especially dairy farming; lumber and shipbuilding also became major industries. The Rhode Island General Assembly legalized African and Native American slavery throughout the colony in 1703, and the slave trade fueled the growth of Providence and Newport into major ports. By 1755, enslaved people made up 10% of the colony's population. The Rhode Island merchants also profited by distilling rum as part of the triangular trade in slaves and sugar between Africa, America, and the Caribbean.

== American Revolutionary period ==
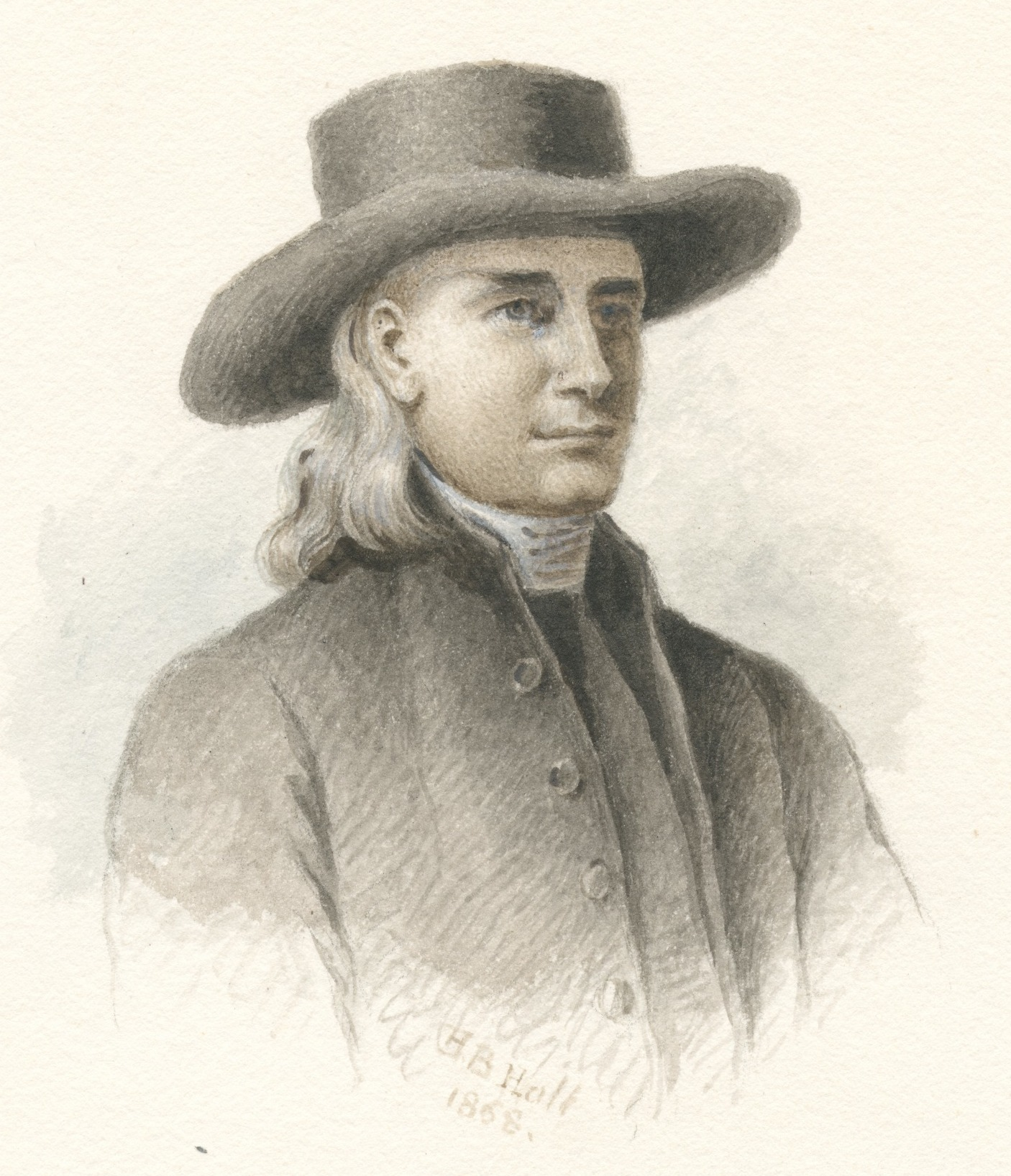
Four-time governor of the colony and first chancellor of Brown University Stephen Hopkins was influential in his support of the American Revolution.

Rhode Island was the first of the Thirteen Colonies to take up arms against Great Britain in the Gaspee Affair, when an armed group of men attacked and burned a British Navy ship. This impromptu attack occurred in June, 1772, more than a year before the more famous Boston Tea Party.

Leading figures in the colony were involved in the 1776 launch of the American Revolutionary War which sought American independence from the British Empire. This included Governors Stephen Hopkins and Samuel Ward, as well as John Brown, Nicholas Brown, William Ellery, the Reverend James Manning, and the Reverend Ezra Stiles, each of whom had played an influential role in founding Brown University in Providence in 1764 as a sanctuary for religious and intellectual freedom.

On May 4, 1776, Rhode Island became the first of the 13 colonies to renounce its allegiance to the British Crown, and it was the fourth to ratify the Articles of Confederation among the newly sovereign states on February 9, 1778. It boycotted the 1787 convention that drew up the United States Constitution, and initially refused to ratify it. It relented after Congress sent a series of constitutional amendments to the states for ratification, the Bill of Rights guaranteeing specific personal freedoms and rights, clear limitations on the government's power in judicial and other proceedings, and explicit declarations that all powers not specifically delegated to Congress by the Constitution are reserved for the states or the people. On May 29, 1790, Rhode Island became the 13th state and the last of the former colonies to ratify the Constitution.

== Boundaries ==
The boundaries of Rhode Island underwent numerous changes from early Colonial times well after American independence, including repeated disputes with Massachusetts and Connecticut who contested for control of territory that ultimately belonged to Rhode Island. Rhode Island's early compacts did not stipulate the boundary on the eastern shore of Narrangansett Bay, and did not include any of Washington County, land that belonged to the Narragansett people. The original settlements were at Providence, Warwick, Newport, and Portsmouth, and the territory was expanded by purchasing land from the Narragansetts westward toward Connecticut and the smaller islands in Narrangasett Bay. Block Island was settled in 1637 after the Pequot War, became a part of the colony in 1664, and was incorporated in 1672 as New Shoreham.

=== Western boundary ===
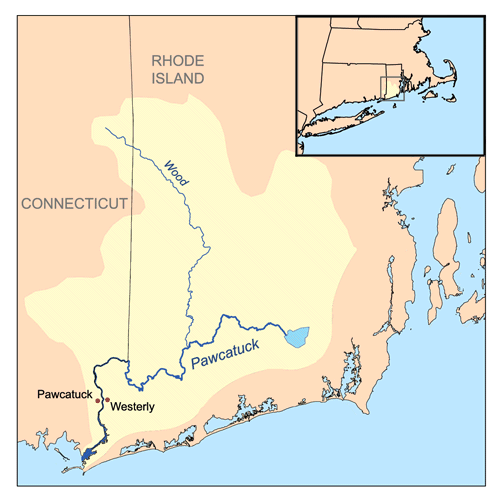
The Pawcatuck River defined the border between Connecticut Colony and Rhode Island.

The western boundary with Connecticut Colony was defined ambiguously as the "Narragansett River" in the Connecticut charter, which was decided by the Royal Commission of 1664 to be the Pawcatuck River from its mouth to the Ashaway River mouth, from which a northward line was drawn to the Massachusetts line. Unfortunately, the commission never presented its report and the issue was unresolved. A second commission was created in 1683 which included Edward Cranfield, Edward Randolph, and several other Massachusetts royalists. This 1683 resolved a long-standing dispute concerning the former Narragansett lands which were also claimed by Connecticut and Massachusetts, although the dispute continued until 1703, when the arbitration award was upheld. After repeated surveys, a mutually agreeable line was defined and surveyed in 1728.

=== Eastern boundary ===
The eastern boundary was an area of dispute with Massachusetts Bay Colony. Overlapping charters had awarded an area extending three miles inland to both Plymouth Colony and Rhode Island east of Narragansett Bay; this area was awarded to Rhode Island in 1741, establishing Rhode Island's jurisdiction over Barrington, Warren, Bristol, Tiverton, and Little Compton, which Massachusetts had claimed. Also adjudicated in the 1741 decision was the award of most of Cumberland to Rhode Island from Massachusetts. The final establishment of the boundaries north of Barrington and east of the Blackstone River occurred almost a century after American independence, requiring protracted litigation and multiple U.S. Supreme Court decisions. In the final decision, a portion of Tiverton was awarded to Massachusetts to become part of Fall River, and two-thirds of Seekonk (now eastern Pawtucket and East Providence) was awarded to Rhode Island in 1862.

=== Northern boundary ===
Rhode Island's northern border with Massachusetts also underwent a number of changes. Massachusetts surveyed this line in 1642, but subsequent surveys by Massachusetts, Rhode Island, and Connecticut agreed that it was placed too far south. In 1718–1719, commissioners for Rhode Island and Massachusetts agreed on roughly that line anyway (except the section east of the Blackstone River, which remained disputed until 1741), and this is where the line remains today.

== Demographics ==
Historical population
| Year | Pop. | ±% |
|---|---|---|
| 1640 | 300 | — |
| 1650 | 785 | +161.7% |
| 1660 | 1,539 | +96.1% |
| 1670 | 2,155 | +40.0% |
| 1680 | 3,017 | +40.0% |
| 1690 | 4,224 | +40.0% |
| 1700 | 5,894 | +39.5% |
| 1710 | 7,573 | +28.5% |
| 1720 | 11,680 | +54.2% |
| 1730 | 16,950 | +45.1% |
| 1740 | 25,255 | +49.0% |
| 1750 | 33,226 | +31.6% |
| 1760 | 45,471 | +36.9% |
| 1770 | 58,196 | +28.0% |
| 1774 | 59,607 | +2.4% |
| 1780 | 52,946 | −11.2% |
Sources: 1640–1760; 1774 1770–1780

From 1640 to 1774, the population of Rhode Island grew from 300 to 59,607, but then declined during the American Revolutionary War to 52,946 in 1780. William Coddington and a group of 13 other men bought Aquidneck Island from the Narragansett Indians in 1639, and the population of Newport, Rhode Island, grew from 96 in 1640 to 7,500 in 1760 (making Newport the fifth-largest city in the Thirteen Colonies at the time), and Newport grew further to 9,209 by 1774. The black population in the colony grew from 25 in 1650 to 3,668 in 1774 (ranging between 3 and 10 percent of the population), and like the state as a whole, declined to 2,671 (or 5 percent of the population) by 1780. In 1774, Narragansetts accounted for 1,479 of the inhabitants of the colony (or three percent).

Due to the Puritan Baptist settlers belief in a secular state influented by the Church, Rhode Island was the only New England colony without an official state church. Rhode Island had four churches with regular services in 1650, out of the 109 places of worship with regular services in the New England colonies (including those without resident clergy), while there was a small Jewish enclave in Newport by 1658. Following the First Great Awakening (1730–1755), the number of regular places of worship in Rhode Island grew to 50 in 1750 (30 Baptist, 12 Congregational, 7 Anglican, and 1 Jewish), with the colony gaining an additional 5 regular places of worship by 1776 (26 Baptist, 11 Quaker, 9 Congregational, 5 Episcopal, 1 Jewish, 1 New Light Congregational, 1 Presbyterian, and 1 Sandemanian).

Puritan mass migration to New England began following the issuance of the royal charter for the Massachusetts Bay Company by Charles I of England in 1629 and continued until the beginning of the English Civil War in 1642. The immigration leveled off following the war's conclusion in 1651, and the population growth owed almost entirely to natural increase rather than immigration or slave importations for the remainder of the 17th century and through the 18th century. Mass migration from New England to the Province of New York and the Province of New Jersey began following the surrender of New Netherland by the Dutch Republic at Fort Amsterdam in 1664, and the population of New York continued to expand by families moving from New England in the 18th century rather than from natural increase.

Most Puritan immigrants to New England moved as families, as approximately two thirds of the male Puritan immigrants to New England were married rather than unmarried indentured servants. By the American Revolutionary War, only two percent of the New England colonial labor force were bonded or convict laborers and another two percent were black slaves, while nine percent of the colonial black population in New England were free, as compared with only three percent in the Southern colonies. In February 1784, the Rhode Island General Assembly passed a gradual emancipation law that increased the ratio of the free black population in Rhode Island to 78 percent by the 1790 U.S. Census; slavery was completely eliminated in Rhode Island by 1842.

== See also ==
- American Revolutionary War - Background and political developments
  - The 1772 Gaspee Affair in sequence and strategic context
- British America
- List of colonial governors of Rhode Island
- List of early settlers of Rhode Island

== General and cited references ==
- Arnold, Samuel Greene (1991) [1859]. History of the State of Rhode Island and Providence Plantations. Vol. 1: 1636–1700. Applewood Books. ISBN 9781429022774.
- Cady, John Hutchins (1936). Rhode Island Boundaries 1636–1936. Rhode Island Tercentary Commission.
- James, Sydney V. (1975). Colonial Rhode Island: A History.
- Labaree, Benjamin (1979). Colonial Massachusetts: A History. Millwood, NY: KTO Press. ISBN 978-0-527-18714-9. OCLC 248194957.
- Lovejoy, David (1987). The Glorious Revolution in America. Middletown, CT: Wesleyan University Press. ISBN 978-0-8195-6177-0. OCLC 14212813.
