= Darts =

Throwing game

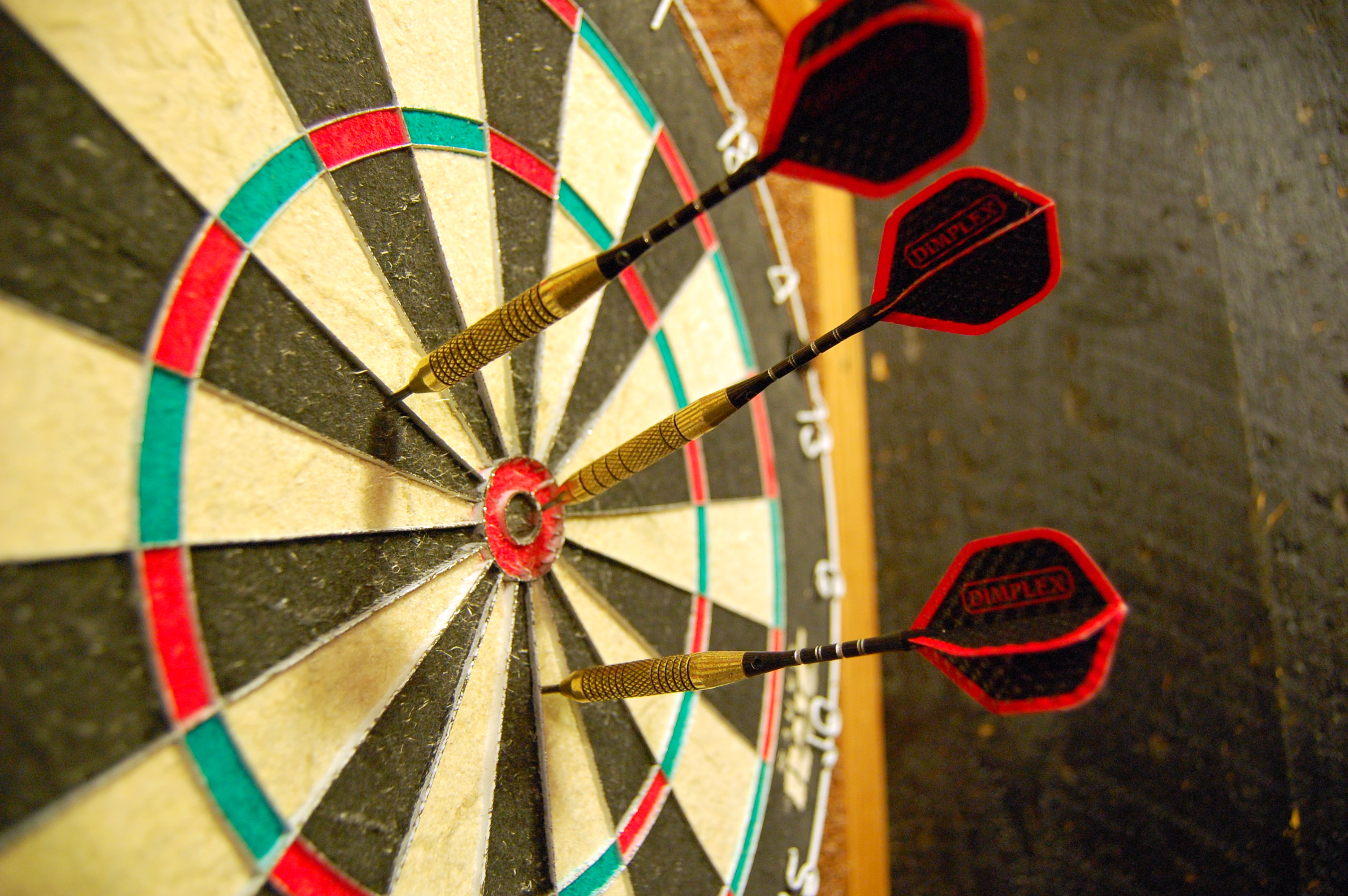
- Darts in a dartboard
- Highest governing body: PDC and World Darts Federation (de facto)
- Nicknames: Arrows
- First played: ~1860s England

Characteristics
- Team members: Team events exist, see WDF World Cup and PDC World Cup of Darts
- Type: Target sports, individual sport, team sport
- Equipment: Set of 3 darts, dartboard
- Glossary: Glossary of darts

Darts is a competitive sport in which two or more players bare-handedly throw small sharp-pointed projectiles known as darts at a round target known as a dartboard.

Points can be scored by hitting specific marked areas of the board, though unlike in sports such as archery, these areas are distributed all across the board and do not follow a principle of points increasing toward the board's bullseye. Though a number of similar games using various boards and rules exist, the term "darts" usually now refers to a standardised game involving a specific board design and set of rules.

Darts is both a professional throwing sport and a traditional pub game. Darts is commonly played in the British Isles, and recreationally loved around the world.

== History ==
In 1908, darts was declared to be a game of skill and was thus allowed to be played in pubs. This came about after the landlord of the Adelphi Inn in Leeds was prosecuted for allowing darts to be played in his pub. As darts was considered a game of chance at the time, it was not allowed on licensed premises. The landlord was supported in his case by the best darts player in the region, William 'Bigfoot' Anakin. A dartboard was hung in the court and Anakin proved that darts was not a game of chance by hitting three double 20s in a row.

=== Dartboard ===

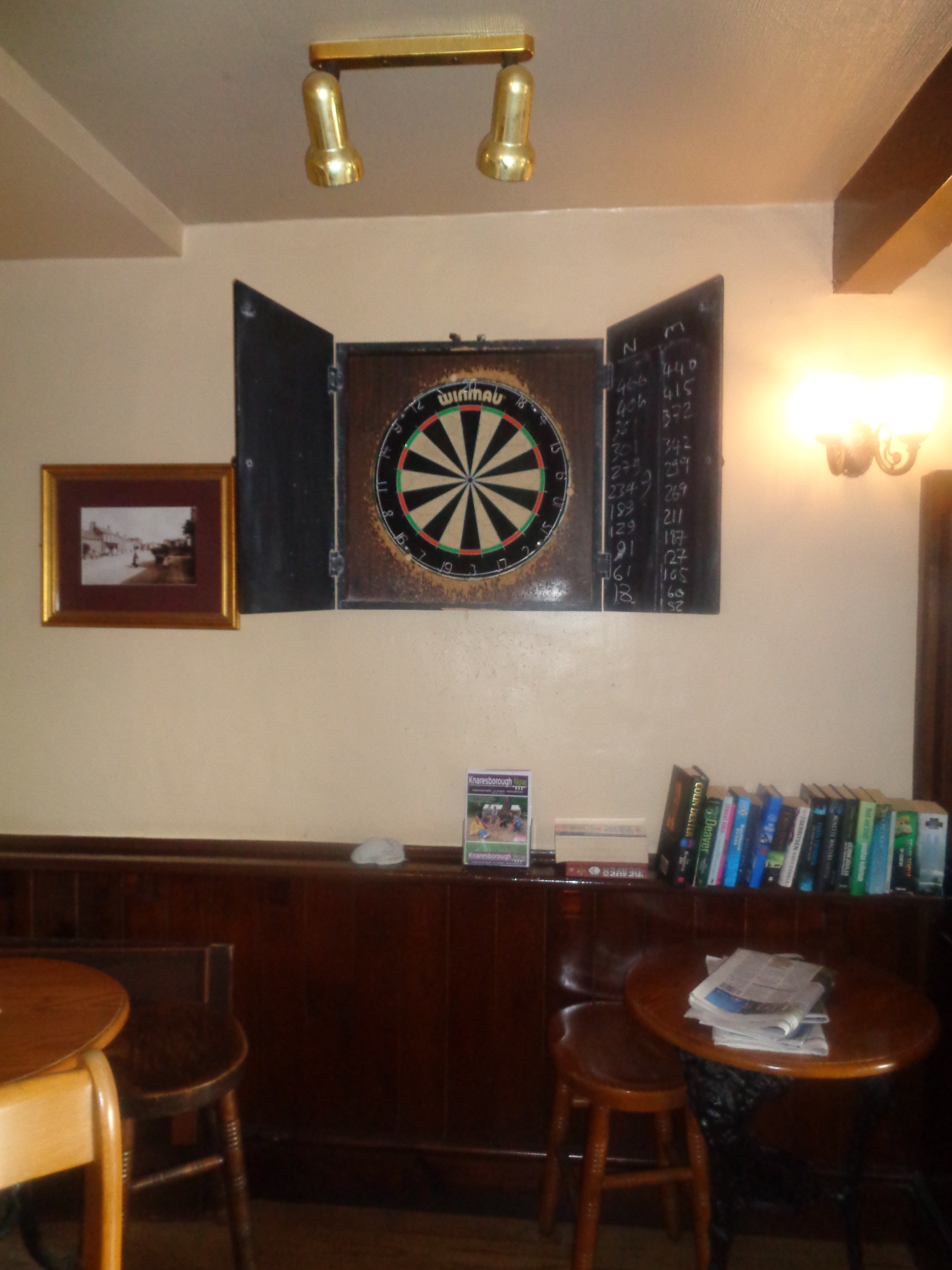
'Doubles board' in a pub in North Yorkshire, England. Doubles boards are common in the North of England.

The original target in the game was likely a cross-section of a tree trunk, whose circular shape and natural concentric rings inspired the standard dartboard design used today. An older name for a dartboard is "butt"; the word comes from the French word but, meaning "target" or "goal".

The standard numbered point system is attributed to Lancashire carpenter Brian Gamlin, who devised it in 1896 to penalise inaccuracy, though this is disputed. Many configurations have been used, varying by time and location. In particular, the Yorkshire and Manchester Log End boards differ from the standard board in that they have no triple, only double and bullseye. The Manchester board is smaller than the standard, with a playing area of only 25 cm (9.8 in) across, with double and bull areas measuring just 4 mm (0.16 in). The London Fives board is another variation, with only 12 equal segments, with the doubles and triples being a quarter of an inch (6.35 mm) wide.

Mathematically, after removing symmetrical dartboards by placing the "20" at the top with one on one side and five on the other, there are 19 factorial, or 121,645,100,408,832,000 possible dartboards. Many different layouts would penalise a player more than the current setup; however, the current setup actually does the job rather efficiently. There have been several mathematical papers published that consider the "optimal" dartboard. (Note: See, for example: 1. K. Selkirk (1976), "Redesigning the dartboard", Mathematical Gazette, vol. 60, pages 171–178; 2. P. J. Everson and A. P. Bassom (January 1995). "Optimal arrangements for a dartboard", Mathematical Spectrum, vol. 27, no. 2, pages 32–34; 3. Eiselt, H; Laporte, Gilbert (February 1991). "A Combinatorial Optimization Problem Arising in Dartboard Design". The Journal of the Operational Research Society. 42 (2). Palgrave Macmillan Journals: 113–118. doi:10.2307/2583175. JSTOR 2583175.; 4. Ivars Peterson (May 19, 1997). "Around the dartboard"; 5. G. L. Cohen and E. Tonkes (2001) "Dartboard arrangements" Archived 2011-06-28 at the Wayback Machine, The Electronic Journal of Combinatorics, vol. 8, no. 2, pages 4; 6. Ryan J. Tibshirani, Andrew Price, and Jonathan Taylor (January 2011) "A statistician plays darts" Archived 2011-07-20 at the Wayback Machine, Journal of the Royal Statistical Society, series A, vol. 174, no. 1, pages 213–226. Article on the preceding article: Cameron Bird (Dec. 2009) "Darts for geeks: Statistician cracks the game's secrets" , Wired.; 7. Trevor Lipscombe and Arturo Sangalli (2001) "The Devil's Dartboard", Crux Mathematicorum, vol. 27, no. 4, pages 215–21.; 8. David F. Percy (Dec. 2012) "The Optimal Dartboard?", Mathematics Today, December 2012, pages 268–270.)

Before World War I, pubs in the United Kingdom had dartboards made from solid blocks of wood, usually elm. But darts pocked the surface of elm such that it was common for a hole to develop around the treble twenty. The other problem was that elm wood needed periodic soaking to keep the wood soft.

In 1935, chemist Ted Leggatt and pub owner Frank Dabbs began using the century plant, a type of agave, to make dartboards. Small bundles of sisal fibres of the same length were bundled together. The bundles were then compressed into a disk and bound with a metal ring. This new dartboard was an instant success. It was more durable and required little maintenance. Furthermore, darts did little or no damage to the board; they simply parted the packed fibres when they entered the board.

=== Darts ===
The earliest darts were stubs of arrows or crossbow bolts. The first purpose-made darts were manufactured from solid wood, wrapped with a strip of lead for weight and fitted with fletchings made from split turkey feathers. These darts were mainly produced in France and became known as French darts. Metal barrels were patented in 1906, but wood continued to be used into the 1950s.

The first metal barrels were made from brass, which was relatively cheap and easy to work. The wooden shafts, threaded to fit the tapped barrel, were either fletched as before or designed to take a paper flight. This type of dart continued to be used into the 1970s. With the widespread use of plastic, the shaft and flight came to be manufactured separately, although one-piece moulded plastic shaft and flight darts were also available.

== Equipment ==
=== Dartboard ===
According to the Darts Regulation Authority, a regulation board is 451 mm (17.8 in) in diameter and is divided into 20 radial sections. Each section is separated with metal wire or a thin band of sheet metal.

Quality dartboards are still made of sisal fibres from Eastern Africa, Brazil, and China; less expensive boards are sometimes made of cork or coiled paper.

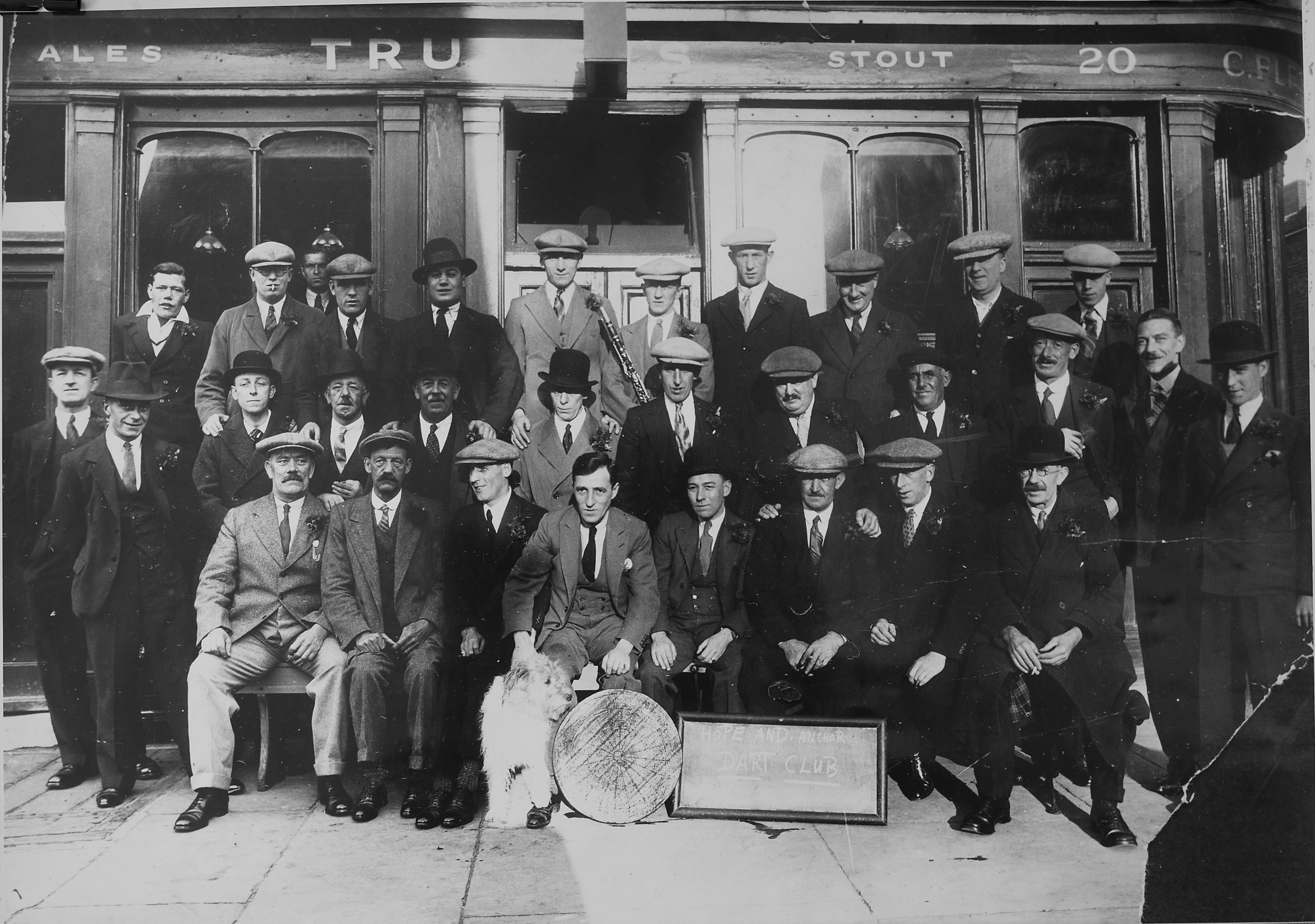
"Hope and Anchor dart club", Hope and Anchor, 20 Waterloo Street (now Macbeth Street), Hammersmith, London, UK, c. 1925; publican Charles Fletcher is seated front row centre with elm board

=== Darts ===
Modern darts are made up of four components: the points, the barrel, the shafts and the flights.

The points come in two common lengths, 32 and 41 mm (1.3 and 1.6 in) and are sometimes knurled or coated to improve players' grip. Others are designed to retract slightly on impact to lessen the chance of the dart bouncing out.

The barrels come in a variety of weights and are usually constructed from brass, nickel-silver, or a tungsten alloy. Brass is cheap but light and therefore brass barrels tend to be very bulky. Tungsten, on the other hand, is twice as dense as brass; thus a tungsten barrel of equivalent weight could be thirty percent smaller in diameter than a brass one. Pure tungsten is very brittle, however, so an alloy is commonly used, with between 80 and 95 percent tungsten and the remainder usually nickel, iron, or copper. Nickel-silver darts offer a compromise between density and cost. Barrels come in three basic shapes: cylindrical, ton, or torpedo.

- Cylindrical barrels are the same diameter along their entire length and so tend to be long and thin. Their slenderness makes them better for grouping, but because they are long, the centre of gravity is further back.
- Ton-shaped barrels are thin at either end and bulge in the middle. This makes them fatter than a cylindrical barrel of equivalent weight but the centre of gravity is further forward and so theoretically easier to throw.
- Torpedo-shaped barrels are widest at the pointed end and taper towards the rear. This shape keeps the bulk of the weight as far forward as possible but, like the ton, gives it a larger diameter than the cylinder.

The shafts are manufactured in various lengths, and some are designed to be cut to length. Shafts are generally made from plastics, nylon polymers, or metals such as aluminium and titanium; and can be rigid or flexible. Longer shafts provide greater stability and allow a reduction in flight size which in turn can lead to closer grouping; but, they also shift the weight towards the rear causing the dart to tilt backwards during flight, requiring a harder, faster throw.

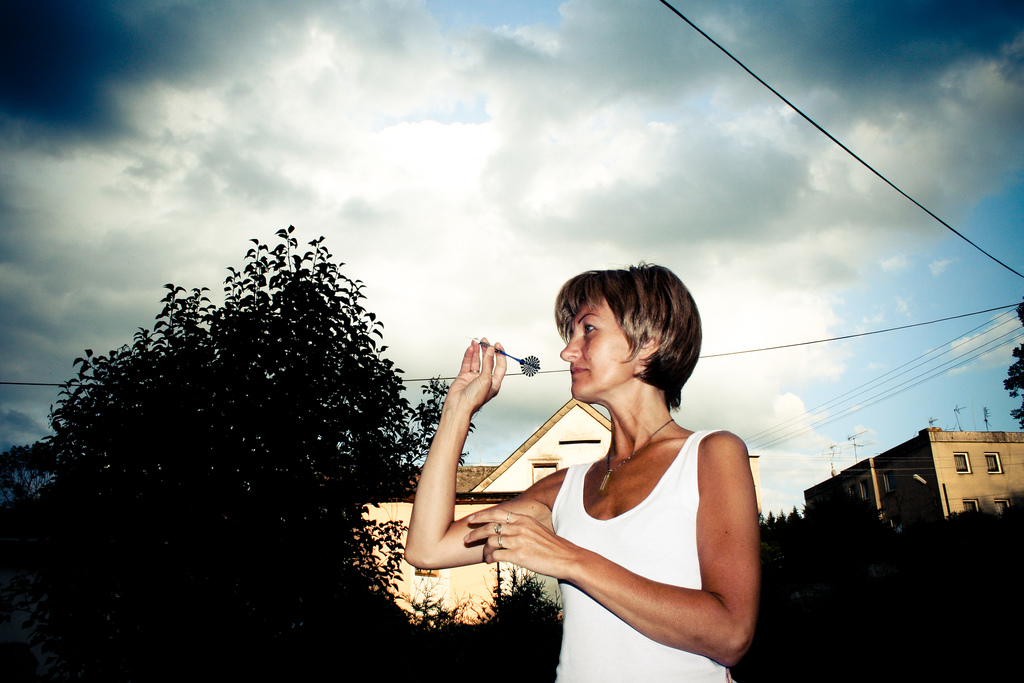
Playing darts

The flight stabilizes the dart by producing drag, thus preventing the rear of the dart from overtaking the point. Modern flights are generally made from plastic, nylon, or foil and are available in a range of shapes and sizes. The three most common shapes in order of size are the standard, the kite, and the smaller pear shape. The less surface area, the less stability; but larger flights hamper close grouping. Some manufacturers have sought to solve this by making a flight long and thin but this, in turn, creates other problems such as changing the dart's centre of gravity. Generally speaking, a heavier dart will require a larger flight.

The choice of barrel, shaft, and flight will depend a great deal on the individual player's throwing style. For competitive purposes, a dart cannot weigh more than 50 g (1.8 oz) including the shaft and flight and cannot exceed a total length of 300 mm (12 in).

=== Playing dimensions ===
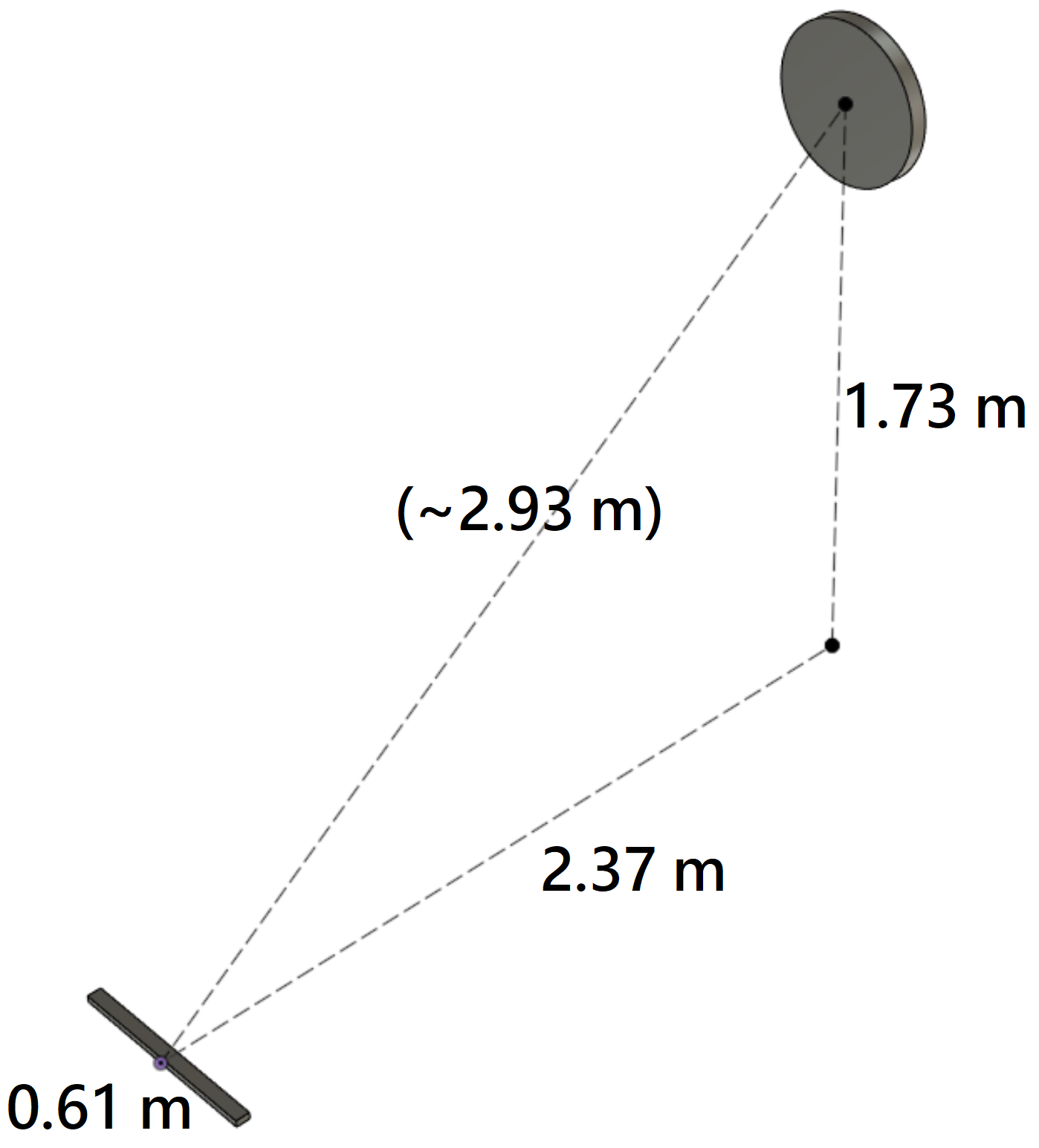
According to international regulation, the dartboard center should be placed 1.73 m (5 ft 8 in) from the floor, with a horizontal distance of 2.37 m (7 ft 9 in) from the back of the 61 cm (24 in) throwing line (oche) to the face of the dartboard.

The World Darts Federation uses the following standards for play:

- Height: the dartboard is hung so that the centre of the bull's eye is 1.73 m (5 ft 8 in) from the floor. This is considered eye-level for a 1.83 m (6 ft 0 in) tall person.
- Distance: the oche (line behind which the thrower must stand) should be 2.37 m (7 ft 9 in) from the face of the board. If the face projects outward from the wall, owing to the thickness of the board or a cabinet in which it is mounted, the oche must be moved back appropriately to maintain the required distance.

The regulations came about owing to the United Kingdom and the rest of the world playing at different lengths, with 2.37 m (7 ft 9 in) being the compromise length.

=== Other common equipment ===
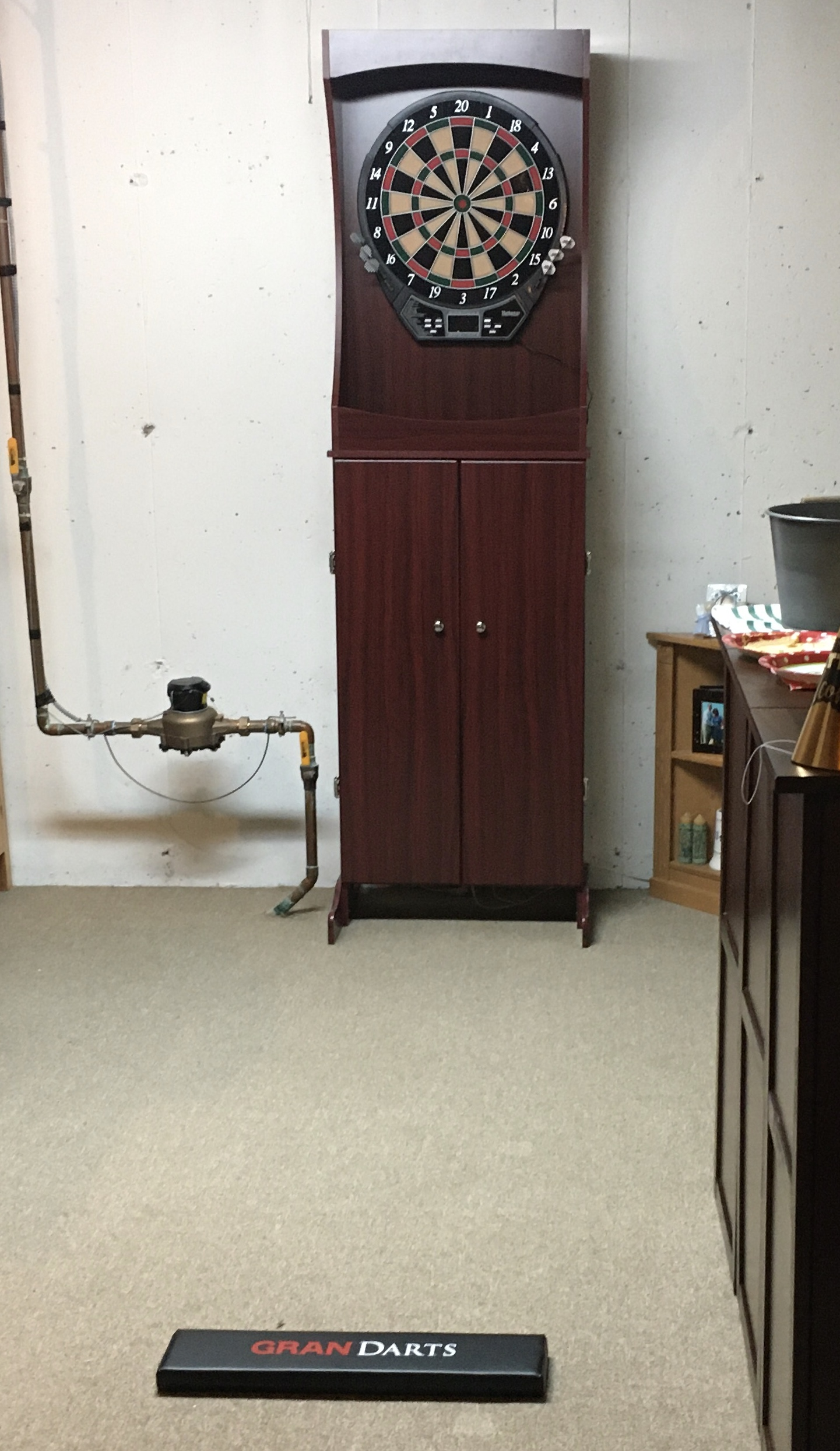
An oche block in place

The board is often mounted in a cupboard with double doors which open to reveal inner chalkboard surfaces, used as a scoreboard.

A mat is often used to determine the position of the oche, the line behind which a player's feet must remain while throwing. Sometimes a block or other marker is used; in informal games any mark on the floor, even a chalk line, may be used.

== Scoring ==
Scores for each region of a dartboard (not to scale) shaded by value

The standard dartboard is divided into 20 numbered sections, scoring from 1 to 20 points, by wires running from the small central circle to the outer circular wire. Circular wires within the outer wire subdivide each section into single, double and treble areas. The dartboard featured on The Indoor League television show of the 1970s did not feature a treble section, and according to host Fred Trueman during the first episode, this is the traditional Yorkshire board.

Various games are played using the standard dartboard. However, in the official game, any dart landing inside the outer wire scores as follows:

- Hitting one of the large portions of each of the numbered sections, traditionally alternately coloured black and white, scores the point value of that section.
- Hitting the thin inner portions of these sections, roughly halfway between the outer wire and the central circle coloured red or green, scores triple the point value of that section.
- Hitting the thin outer portions of these sections, again coloured red or green, scores double the point value of that section. The double-20 is often referred to as double-top, reflecting the 20's position on the dartboard.
- The central circle is divided into a green outer ring worth 25 points (known as "outer", "outer bull", or "single bull") and a red or black inner circle (usually known as "bull", "inner bull" or "double bull"), worth 50 points. The term "bullseye" can mean either the whole central part of the board or just the inner red/black section. The term "bull's ring" usually means just the green outer ring. The inner bull counts as a double when doubling in or out.
- Hitting outside the outer wire scores nothing.
- A dart only scores if its point is embedded in or is touching the playing surface. This rule applies to any dart that lands in such a way as to be partially or totally supported by others that have already hit the board.
- When a standard board is used, any dart whose point does not remain in contact with the playing surface until being collected by the player does not score. This includes darts that bounce off the board for any reason, that fall off on their own, or that are dislodged by the impact of later throws. However, when an electronic board is used, fallen/dislodged darts do score as long as their impacts have registered on the board first.

The highest score possible with three darts is 180, commonly known as a "ton 80" (100 points is called a ton), obtained when all three darts land in the triple 20. In the televised game, the referee frequently announces a score of 180 in exuberant style.

=== Finishing and check outs ===
Once a player reaches a low enough score, they are considered to be "on a finish", meaning they can win the game/leg with their remaining darts. In professional matches, the match referee will usually tell the player which score they require once on a finish. As the winning dart in a game must be a double or inner bullseye, the highest possible finish with three darts is 170 (T20, T20, inner bull), commonly known as the "Big Fish". Finishes are also known as "check outs". Regular players become familiar with the combinations needed to check out a particular number. For instance, a player on 138 could hit T20, T18, D12. Most numbers can be checked out with more than one combination (for 138, a player could also hit T19, T19, D12).

Good arithmetic is helpful, as in the event of missing a target number players need to quickly recalculate their new score and which number they now need to hit. For instance, if a player on 93 (T19, D18) hits single-19 with their first dart, they can still finish, but will now need to check out 74 (T14, D16). Checkout charts detailing which numbers are required for each particular finish are widely used.

=== The Quadro board ===
In the 1990s, a board with a "quad" ring between the triple ring and the bullseye appeared, which gave quadruple points, meaning a 240 maximum (three quad-20s), a 210 maximum checkout (Q20-Q20-Bull) and a seven-dart finish (five quad-20s, triple-17, bullseye) were possible. One make of this board was the Harrows Quadro 240.

The board was used during the short-lived WDC UK Matchplay. Although no seven dart finish was ever scored on the board, John Lowe did come close to a 9 dart finish in the 1993 PDC UK Matchplay. He scored 200 (T20-T20-Q20), then 160 (20-T20-Q20), and got his final T20 and T15, only to miss D18 on his final throw. Several players did score a 240 maximum during the event and Phil Taylor hit a 188 checkout (Q20-Q20-D14). The tournament was discontinued in 1996 and the board has not been used in a professional event since.

=== Skill level and aiming ===
Assuming standard scoring, the optimal area to aim for on the dartboard to maximize the player's score varies significantly based on the player's skill. The skilled player should aim for the centre of the T20, and as the player's skill decreases, their aim moves slightly up and to the left of the T20. At σ = 16.4 mm the best place to aim jumps to the T19. As the player's skill decreases further, the best place to aim curls into the centre of the board, stopping a bit lower than and to the left of the bullseye at σ = 100 mm.

== Games ==
Many games can be played on a dartboard, but the term "darts" generally refers to a game in which one player at a time throws three darts per turn. The throwing player must stand so that no portion of their feet extends past the leading edge of the oche, but may stand on any other portion and/or lean forward over it if desired.

A game of darts is generally contested between two players, who take turns. Each player begins with the same initial score, commonly 301 or 501. Each turn, the points that a player earns are subtracted from their score. The first player to reduce their score to exactly zero ("check out"), with the final dart landing in either the bullseye or a double segment, is the winner. On the final turn, not all three darts need to be thrown; the game can be finished on any of the three darts. When two teams play, the starting score is sometimes increased to 701 or even 1001; the rules remain the same.

A throw that reduces a player's score below zero, to exactly one, or to zero but not ending with a double or bullseye is known as "going bust". The player's score is reset to its value at the start of that turn, and any remaining throws in the turn are forfeited.

In some variants, a player who busts has their score reset to its value before the individual dart that caused the bust. This rule (referred to as a "Northern Bust" in London) is considered by some players to be a purer version of the game. Under the standard rules above, a player left with a difficult finish (e.g. 5 and one dart remaining) might deliberately bust in order to revert to an earlier score that would allow an easier finish. Under Northern Bust rules, though, doing so would leave them on 5.

A darts match is played over a fixed number of games, known as legs. A match may be divided into sets, with each set being contested as over a fixed number of legs.

Although playing straight down from 501 is standard in darts, sometimes a double must be hit to begin scoring, known as "doubling in", with all darts thrown before hitting a double not being counted. The PDC's World Grand Prix uses this format.

The minimum number of thrown darts required to complete a leg of 501 is nine. The most common nine-dart finish consists of two 180 maximums followed by a 141 checkout (T20-T19-D12), but there are many other possible ways of achieving the feat. Three 167s (T20-T19-Bull) is considered a pure or perfect nine-dart finish by some players.

=== Other games and variants ===
There are several regional variations on the standard rules and scoring systems.

==== American darts ====
American darts is a regional U.S. variant of the game (most U.S. dart players play the traditional games described above). This style of dartboard is most often found in eastern Pennsylvania, New Jersey, Delaware, Maryland, and parts of New York state.

==== Beer darts ====
Beer darts is a drinking game that involves throwing darts at opponents' beer cans. The resulting drinking actions depend on how and where the beer can was hit with the dart.

==== Belgian darts ====
The original name of this sport was called in Dutch Vogelpik (Birdpeck). Vogelpik is the early version of the modern game of Belgian darts. Belgian darts has remained a very popular game in the south of The Netherlands and the Belgian community since the 18th century. It is not only relaxing but also helps to develop coordination skills, precision and self-control. Each player has a set of four darts. Four thrown darts equals a turn. Five turns by each player constitutes a game. The dart board score starting from the outside ring are: 5 - 10 - 15 - 20 - 25 - bullseye, even in the modern darts in Dutch still known as Roos (English: Rose), 50.

==== Cricket ====
Cricket is a widely played darts game involving a race to control and score on numbers between 20 and 15 and the bullseye, by hitting each of these targets for three marks to open or own it for scoring. A hit on the target counts as one mark, while hits in the doubles ring of the target count as two marks in one throw, and on the triples ring as three. Once opened in this manner, until the opponent closes that number with three marks on it of their own, each additional hit by the owner/opener scores points equal to the number of the target (which may also be doubled and tripled, e.g. a triple-20 is worth 60 points). The outer bullseye counts as 25 points and the inner as 50.

==== Dartball ====
Dartball is a darts game based on the sport of baseball. It is played on a diamond-shaped board and has similar scoring to baseball.

==== Dart golf ====
Dart golf is a darts game based on the sport of golf and is regulated by the World Dolf Federation (WDFF). It is played on both special golf dartboards and traditional dartboards. Scoring is similar to golf.

==== Fives ====
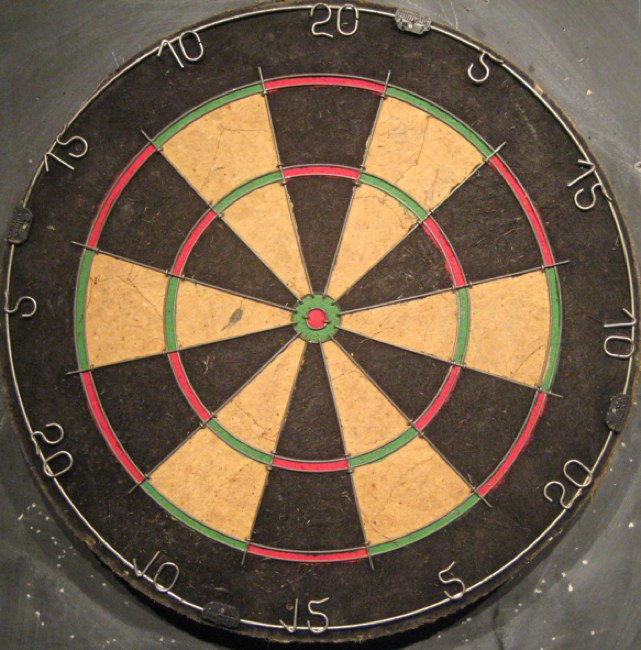
An 'East-End' or 'Fives' dartboard

This is a regional variant still played in some parts of the East End of London. The board has fewer, larger segments, all numbered either 5, 10, 15 or 20. Players play down from 505 rather than 501, and, at 2.7 m (8 ft 10 in), stand the farthest away from the board of any mainstream variation.

==== Halve it ====
"Halve it" is a darts game popular in the United Kingdom and parts of North America where competitors try to hit previously agreed targets on a standard dart board. Failure to do so within a single throw (3 darts) results in the player losing half their accumulated score. Any number of players can take part and the game can vary in length depending on the number of targets selected. The game can be tailored to the skill level of the players by selecting easy or difficult targets.

==== Killer ====
"Killer" is a 'knock-out' game for two or more players (at its best at 4–6 players). Initially, each player throws a dart at the board with their non-dominant hand to obtain their 'number'. No two players can have the same number. Once everyone has a number, each player takes it in turn to get their number five times with their three darts (doubles count twice, and triples three times). Once a person has reached 5, they become a 'killer'. This means they can aim for other peoples numbers, taking a point off for each time they hit (doubles ×2, triples ×3). If a person gets to zero they are out. A killer can aim for anyone's numbers, even another killer's. Players cannot get more than 5 points. The winner is 'the last man standing'.

Another version of "Killer" is a "knock-out" game for three or more players (the more the better). To start, everyone has a pre-determined number of lives, (usually 5) and a randomly chosen player throws a single dart at the board to set a target (i.e. single 18) and does not play until that target is hit. The next player up has 3 darts to try to hit the target (single 18), if they fail, they lose a life and the following player tries. Once a player succeeds at hitting the target, they then become the target setter and throw a dart to set a new target. The initial target setter swaps places with the new target setter. The games carry on until every players' lives have been used, the last man standing is the target setter whose target was not hit. For less experienced players, doubles and trebles as part of the same number can be counted, i.e. a target of treble 20 can still be counted as a success if the double or single 20 is hit and vice versa.

==== Lawn darts ====
Lawn darts (also called yard darts and garden darts) is an outdoor game, with gameplay and objective similar to horseshoes, in that the darts are thrown to land in a circle target on the ground. The darts are similar to the ancient Roman thrown weapon plumbata. For a brand named Jarts, the darts weighed about 1/4 pound, were 12 inches long, and had a pointed tip, the better to stick into the ground. On December 19, 1988, the U.S. Consumer Product Safety Commission introduced an outright ban on metal-tipped lawn darts in the US after publicity of thousands of injuries and several deaths.

==== Round the clock ====
Round the clock (also called around the world, 20 to 1, and jumpers) is a game involving any number of players where the objective is to hit each section sequentially from 1 to 20 starting after a starting double.

==== Shanghai ====
Shanghai is played with at least two players. The standard version is played in seven rounds. In round one players throw their darts aiming for the 1 section, round 2, the 2 sections, and so on until round 7. Standard scoring is used, and doubles and triples are counted. Only hits on the wedge for that round are counted. The winner is the person who has the most points at the end of seven rounds (1–7); or who scores a Shanghai, which wins instantly, a Shanghai being throws that hit a triple, a double and single (in any order) of the number that is in play.

Shanghai can also be played for 20 rounds to use all numbers. A Fairer Start for Shanghai: To prevent players from becoming too practised at shooting for the 1, the number sequence can begin at the number of the dart that lost the throw for the bullseye to determine the starting thrower. For example; Thrower A shoots for the bullseye and hits the 17. Thrower B shoots for the bullseye and hits it. Thrower B then begins the game, starting on the number 17, then 18, 19, 20, 1, 2, 3, etc. through 16 (if no player hits Shanghai). Shanghai is one of the disciplines in the British Pentathlon tournament.

==== Finnish darts ====
Tikanheitto is a casual variety played in Finland, consisting of a simple ringed monochrome board, labeled 1 to 10 towards the centre. Players set the board at a height of 1.5 m (5 ft) and a distance of 5 m (15 ft), earn the landed ring's value and go for at least 250 points.

== Darts organisations ==
=== Professional organisations ===
Of the two professional steel-tip organisations, the British Darts Organisation (BDO), founded in 1973, was the older. Its tournaments were often shown on the BBC in the UK. The BDO was a member of the World Darts Federation (WDF) (founded 1976), along with organisations in some 60 other countries worldwide. The BDO originally organised a number of the more prestigious British tournaments with a few notable exceptions such as the News of the World Championship and the national events run under the auspices of the National Darts Association of Great Britain. However, many sponsors were lost and British TV coverage became much reduced by the early 1990s.

In 1992, a group of darts players broke off from the BDO and, in pursuit of higher prize money, formed the Professional Darts Corporation (PDC). The PDC organises their tournaments as well as their world championship.

In soft-tip, the World Soft Darts Association serves as a governing body of the sport, with events that feature players that play also steel-tip in PDC events and other players that compete exclusively in soft-tip events.

=== Amateur league organisations ===
The American Darts Organization (ADO) promulgates rules and standards for amateur league darts and sanctions tournaments in the United States. The ADO began operation January 1, 1976, with 30 charter member clubs and a membership of 7,500 players. In 2014, the ADO had a membership that averaged 250 clubs yearly representing roughly 50,000 members.

== Professional play ==
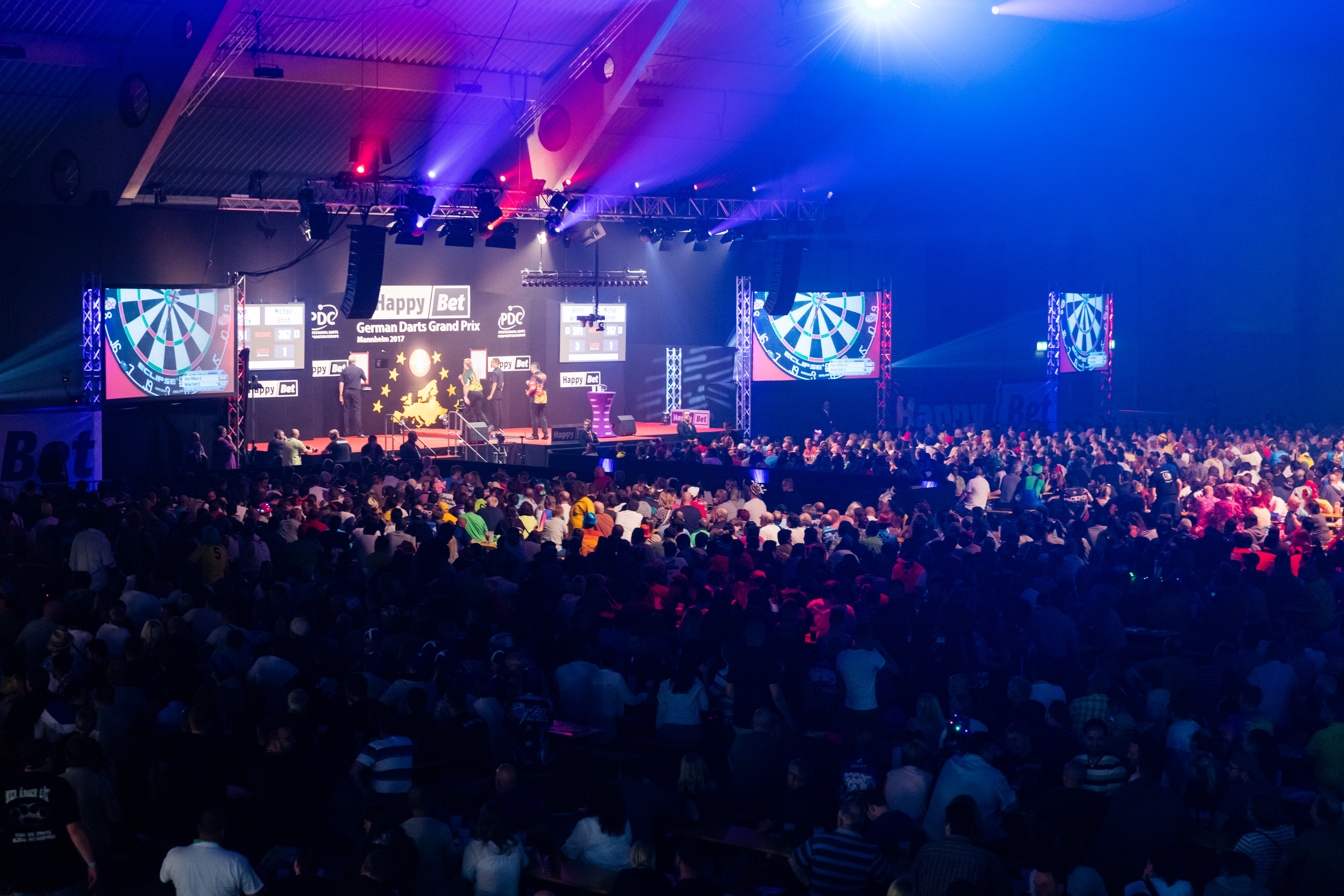
Professional tournament

Since the end of the News of the World Darts Championship and other past major tournaments, the BDO and PDC both organised a televised World Professional Championship, however, since the financial collapse of the BDO, their edition of the world championship has not been held since 2020. The PDC championship is held annually over the Christmas/New Year period, as was the BDO event, with the PDC version finishing slightly earlier than the BDO tournament did. The BDO World Championship had been running since 1978; the PDC World Championship started in 1994.

The PDC's major tournaments are the World Championship, Premier League, UK Open, World Matchplay, World Grand Prix, European Championship, Players Championship Finals, World Cup of Darts, Masters, world series of darts finals and the Grand Slam of Darts. All of these are broadcast live on Sky Sports and ITV television in the UK. They also hold PDC Pro Tour events and smaller category events around the UK.

The WDF World Cup for national teams and a singles tournament has been played biennially since 1977. The WDF also organise the Europe Cup. The PDC has their world cup competition, the PDC World Cup of Darts.

For soft-tip darts, WSDA and DARTSLIVE run "THE WORLD", an international tour which serves as the Soft Darts World Championship, with the final tournament referred to as the Grand Final, with the circuit first taking place in 2011. Stages take place mostly in East Asia, with some rounds held in the United States and Europe. Matches during WSDA events are played with both 701 and Cricket during a set, usually with the same number of games of each, giving both players throws during both formats, and the final round determined by player choice.

Two Dutch independently organised major tournaments, the International Darts League and the World Darts Trophy introduced a mix of BDO and PDC players in 2006 and 2007. Both organisations allocated rankings to the tournaments, but these two events are now discontinued.

=== World champions ===
Year	Winner PDC	Winner BDO / WDF	Women's winner BDO / WDF	Women's winner PDC
1978	Not held	(Wales) Leighton Rees (1)	Not held	Not held
1979	Not held	(England) John Lowe (1)	Not held	Not held
1980	Not held	(England) Eric Bristow (1)	Not held	Not held
1981	Not held	(England) Eric Bristow (2)	Not held	Not held
1982	Not held	(Scotland) Jocky Wilson (1)	Not held	Not held
1983	Not held	(England) Keith Deller (1)	Not held	Not held
1984	Not held	(England) Eric Bristow (3)	Not held	Not held
1985	Not held	(England) Eric Bristow (4)	Not held	Not held
1986	Not held	(England) Eric Bristow (5)	Not held	Not held
1987	Not held	(England) John Lowe (2)	Not held	Not held
1988	Not held	(England) Bob Anderson (1)	Not held	Not held
1989	Not held	(Scotland) Jocky Wilson (2)	Not held	Not held
1990	Not held	(England) Phil Taylor (1)	Not held	Not held
1991	Not held	(England) Dennis Priestley (1)	Not held	Not held
1992	Not held	(England) Phil Taylor (2)	Not held	Not held
1993	Not held	(England) John Lowe (3)	Not held	Not held
1994	(England) Dennis Priestley (2)	(Canada) John Part (1)	Not held	Not held
1995	(England) Phil Taylor (3)	(Wales) Richie Burnett (1)	Not held	Not held
1996	(England) Phil Taylor (4)	(England) Steve Beaton (1)	Not held	Not held
1997	(England) Phil Taylor (5)	(Scotland) Les Wallace (1)	Not held	Not held
1998	(England) Phil Taylor (6)	(Netherlands) Raymond van Barneveld (1)	Not held	Not held
1999	(England) Phil Taylor (7)	(Netherlands) Raymond van Barneveld (2)	Not held	Not held
2000	(England) Phil Taylor (8)	(England) Ted Hankey (1)	Not held	Not held
2001	(England) Phil Taylor (9)	(England) John Walton (1)	(England) Trina Gulliver (1)	Not held
2002	(England) Phil Taylor (10)	(Australia) Tony David (1)	(England) Trina Gulliver (2)	Not held
2003	(Canada) John Part (2)	(Netherlands) Raymond van Barneveld (3)	(England) Trina Gulliver (3)	Not held
2004	(England) Phil Taylor (11)	(England) Andy Fordham (1)	(England) Trina Gulliver (4)	Not held
2005	(England) Phil Taylor (12)	(Netherlands) Raymond van Barneveld (4)	(England) Trina Gulliver (5)	Not held
2006	(England) Phil Taylor (13)	(Netherlands) Jelle Klaasen (1)	(England) Trina Gulliver (6)	Not held
2007	(Netherlands) Raymond van Barneveld (5)	(England) Martin Adams (1)	(England) Trina Gulliver (7)	Not held
2008	(Canada) John Part (3)	(Wales) Mark Webster (1)	(Russia) Anastasia Dobromyslova (1)	Not held
2009	(England) Phil Taylor (14)	(England) Ted Hankey (2)	(Netherlands) Francis Hoenselaar (1)	Not held
2010	(England) Phil Taylor (15)	(England) Martin Adams (2)	(England) Trina Gulliver (8)	(United States) Stacy Bromberg (1)
2011	(England) Adrian Lewis (1)	(England) Martin Adams (3)	(England) Trina Gulliver (9)	Not held
2012	(England) Adrian Lewis (2)	(Netherlands) Christian Kist (1)	(Russia) Anastasia Dobromyslova (2)	Not held
2013	(England) Phil Taylor (16)	(England) Scott Waites (1)	(Russia) Anastasia Dobromyslova (3)	Not held
2014	(Netherlands) Michael van Gerwen (1)	(England) Stephen Bunting (1)	(England) Lisa Ashton (1)	Not held
2015	(Scotland) Gary Anderson (1)	(England) Scott Mitchell (1)	(England) Lisa Ashton (2)	Not held
2016	(Scotland) Gary Anderson (2)	(England) Scott Waites (2)	(England) Trina Gulliver (10)	Not held
2017	(Netherlands) Michael van Gerwen (2)	(England) Glen Durrant (1)	(England) Lisa Ashton (3)	Not held
2018	(England) Rob Cross (1)	(England) Glen Durrant (2)	(England) Lisa Ashton (4)	Not held
2019	(Netherlands) Michael van Gerwen (3)	(England) Glen Durrant (3)	(Japan) Mikuru Suzuki (1)	Not held
2020	(Scotland) Peter Wright (1)	(Wales) Wayne Warren (1)	(Japan) Mikuru Suzuki (2)	Not held
2021	Gerwyn Price (1)	Not held		Not held
2022	Peter Wright (2)	(Northern Ireland) Neil Duff (1)	(England) Beau Greaves (1)	Not held
2023	Michael Smith (1)	(Belgium) Andy Baetens (1)	(England) Beau Greaves (2)	Not held
2024	Luke Humphries (1)	(Republic of Ireland) Shane McGuirk (1)	(England) Beau Greaves (3)	Not held
2025	Luke Littler (1)	(Netherlands) Jimmy van Schie (1)	(England) Deta Hedman (1)	Not held
2026	Luke Littler (2)			Not held

Multiple-time world champions

16 Phil Taylor The Power (2 BDO, 14 PDC)
10 Trina Gulliver The Golden Girl
5 Raymond van Barneveld Barney (4 BDO, 1 PDC)
5 Eric Bristow The Crafty Cockney
4 Lisa Ashton The Lancashire Rose
3 Martin Adams Wolfie
3 Anastasia Dobromyslova From Russia With Love
3 Glen Durrant Duzza
3 Michael van Gerwen Mighty Mike
3 Beau Greaves Beau 'n' Arrow
3 John Lowe Old Stoneface
3 John Part Darth Maple (1 BDO, 2 PDC)
2 Gary Anderson The Flying Scotsman
2 Ted Hankey The Count
2 Adrian Lewis Jackpot
2 Luke Littler The Nuke
2 Dennis Priestley The Menace (1 BDO, 1 PDC)
2 Mikuru Suzuki Miracle
2 Scott Waites Scotty 2 Hotty
2 Jocky Wilson Jocky
2 Peter Wright Snakebite

One-Time World Champions

Bob Anderson The Limestone Cowboy
Andy Baetens Beast from the East
Steve Beaton The Bronzed Adonis
Stacy Bromberg The Wish Granter
Stephen Bunting The Bullet
Richie Burnett The Prince of Wales
Rob Cross Voltage
Tony David The Deadly Boomerang
Keith Deller The Fella
Neil Duff Duffman
Andy Fordham The Viking
Deta Hedman The Caribbean Queen
Francis Hoenselaar The Crown
Luke Humphries Cool Hand
Christian Kist The Lipstick
Jelle Klaasen The Cobra
Shane McGuirk The Arrow
Scott Mitchell Scotty Dog
Gerwyn Price The Iceman
Leighton Rees Marathon Man
Jimmy van Schie The Dutch Sequoia
Michael Smith Bully Boy
Les Wallace McDanger
John Walton John Boy
Wayne Warren Yank
Mark Webster The Spider

=== World rankings ===
The WDF, PDC and formerly the BDO each maintain their own rankings lists. These lists are commonly used to determine seedings for various tournaments. The WDF rankings are based on the preceding 12 months performances, the BDO reset all ranking points to zero after the seedings for their world championship had been determined, and the PDC Order of Merit is based on prize money earned over two years.

== See also ==
- Darts world rankings—current ranking lists for BDO and PDC
- Darts tournaments—previous winners, history and information
- Darts players profiles
- Nine dart finish—the "perfect" game in darts
- High dart average—average score achieved with all three darts thrown
- Glossary of darts
- Pub games
- Bullseye—a British game show based on darts
- Dart Golf
