= Seal of Rhode Island =

Official government emblem of the U.S. state of Rhode Island

Seal of the State of Rhode Island
- Armiger: State of Rhode Island
- Motto: Hope

The Seal of the State of Rhode Island features a blue field with a golden maritime anchor as its central image below the phrase "HOPE". The anchor has been used as a symbol for Rhode Island since the colony's founding in 1636, well before the region claimed statehood. The first seal of the Colony of Rhode Island, was drawn by William Dyer in 1647.

== History ==
Rhode Island was founded in 1636 by Roger Williams, a Christian minister, Anne Hutchinson, and others seeking religious freedom from persecution in Massachusetts and Europe. The seal's words and emblems were likely inspired by the biblical phrase "hope we have as an anchor of the soul," found in Hebrews, Verse 6:18-19. After Roger Williams received an official charter in England in 1644, the word "Hope" was placed over the seal's anchor and still remains. The outer circle of the seal reads Seal of the State of Rhode Island 1636.

Besides the seal, Roger Williams also used Biblical virtues when he named Providence, Rhode Island, and the islands in Narragansett Bay: Prudence Island, Patience Island, Hope Island, and Despair Island.

== Legal enactment ==
The seal has been adopted by successive Rhode Island government authorities since 1644. The current (2021) General Laws enactment asserts:

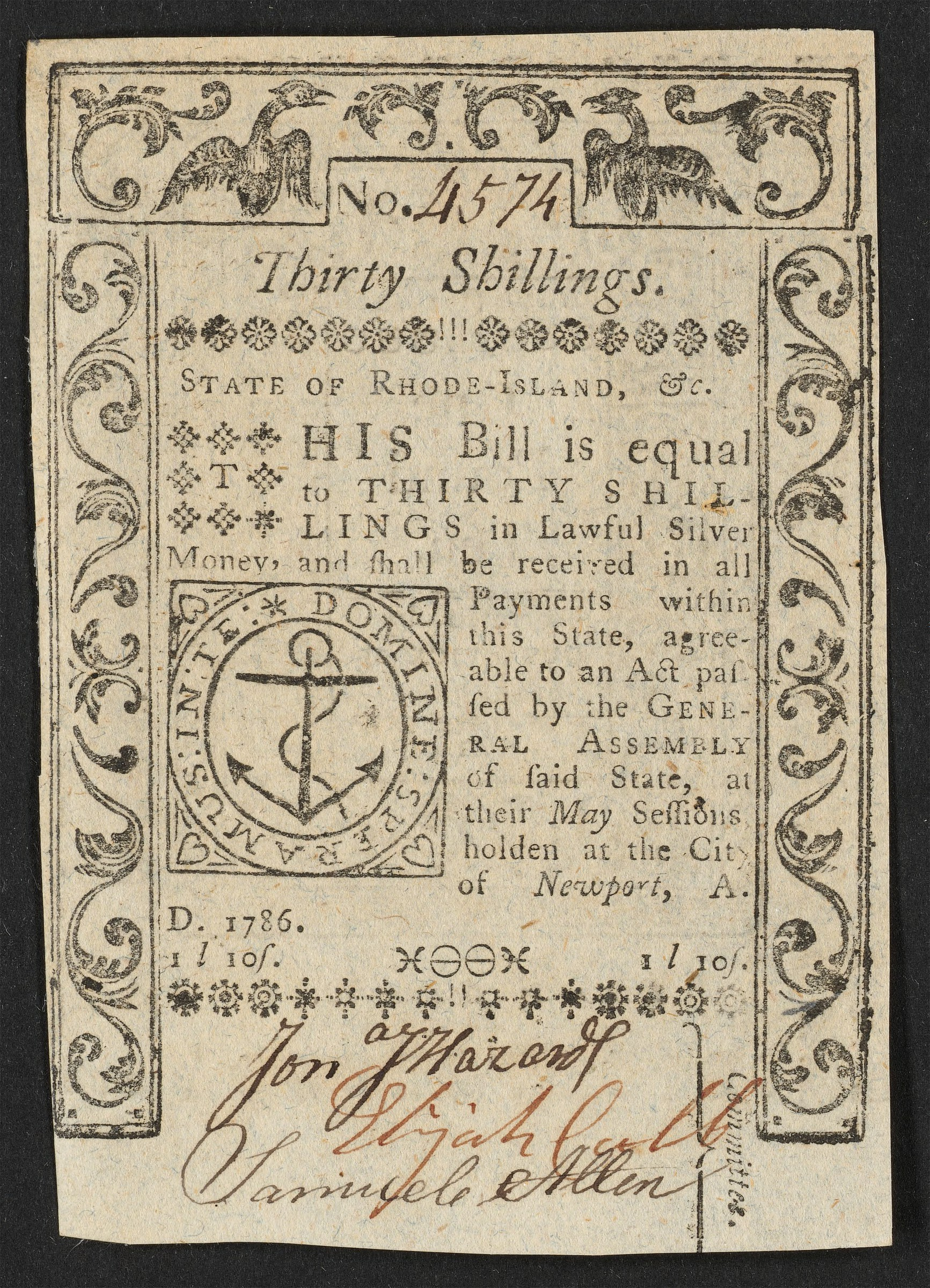
A 1786 Rhode Island bank note featuring the seal.

§ 42-4-2 State seal. – There shall continue to be one seal for the public use of the state; the form of an anchor shall be engraved thereon; the motto thereof shall be the word "Hope"; and in a circle around the outside shall be engraved with the words, "Seal of the State of Rhode Island, 1636".

== Historical seals ==
Rhode Island Seal in 1647, used in the colonial records

The seal used on Rhode Island pounds in the late 18th century

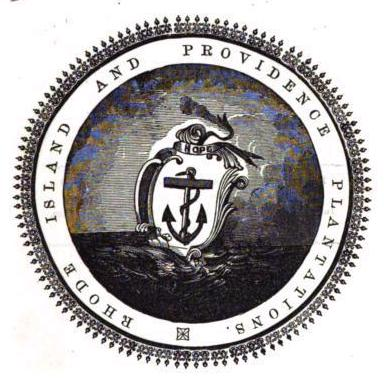
Rhode Island Seal variation used in 1853

Previous version before the state name change in 2020 referendum

Illustration of historical version with starburst

== Government seals ==
Seal of the Governor

Seal of the Lieutenant Governor

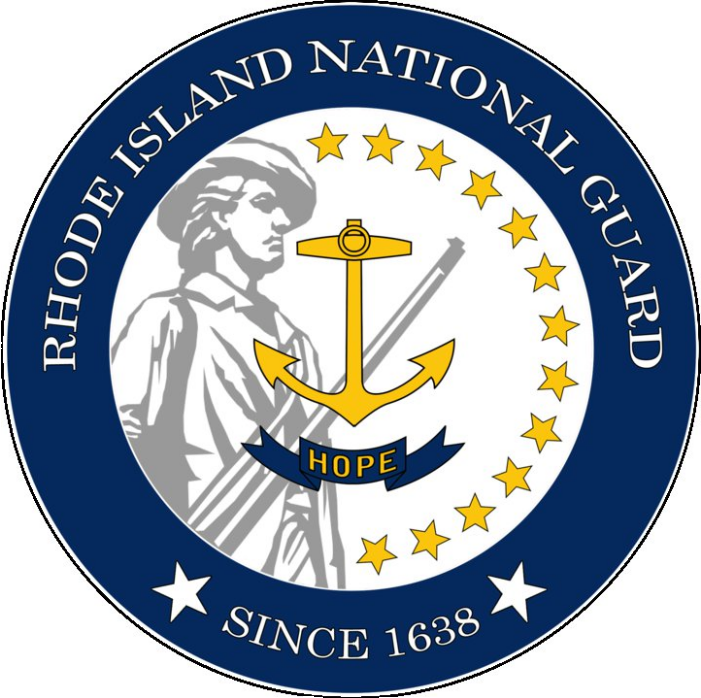
Seal of the Rhode Island National Guard

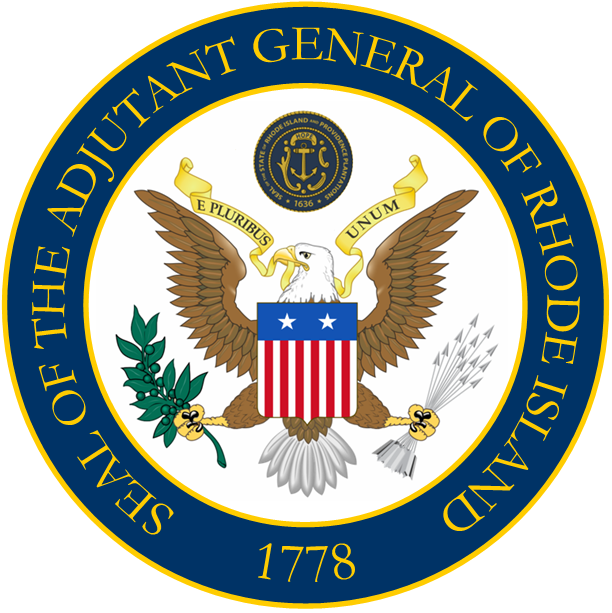
Seal of the Adjutant General of Rhode Island

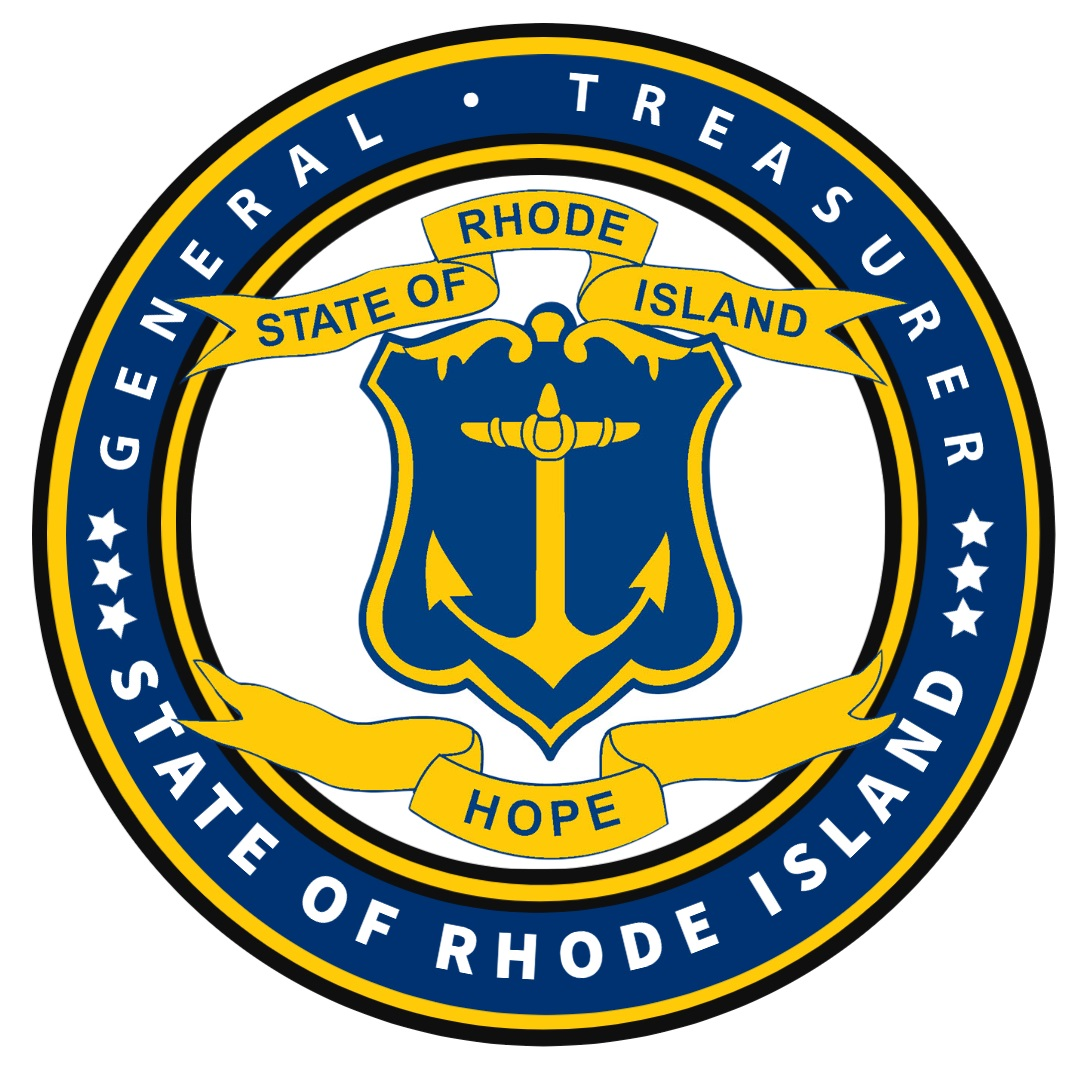
Seal of the General Treasurer of Rhode Island

== See also ==
- Flag of Rhode Island
- Coat of arms of Rhode Island
