= Narragansett Bay National Estuarine Research Reserve =

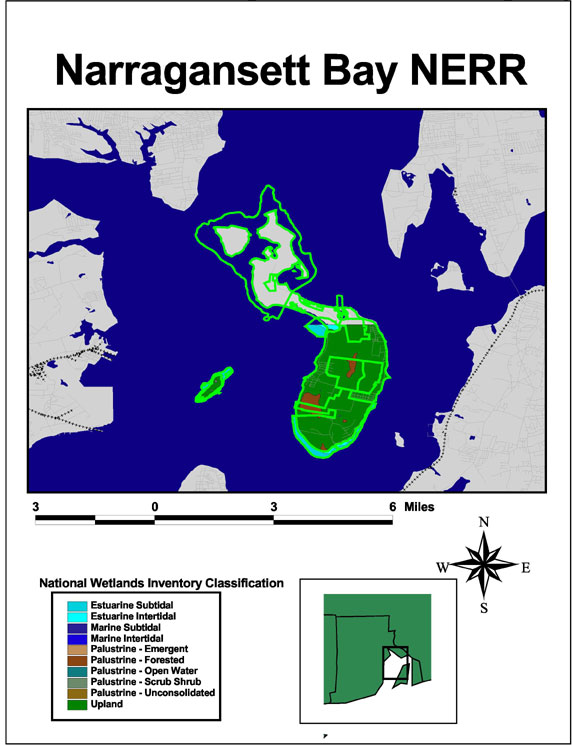
- Narragansett Bay National Estuarine Research Reserve (map courtesy NOAA)
- Location: Narragansett Bay, Rhode Island, United States
- Coordinates: 41°36′08″N 71°22′04″W
- Area: 2,353 acres (9.52 km^{2}) land 1,591 acres (644 ha) water
- Established: 1980

The Narragansett Bay National Estuarine Research Reserve is a Marine Protected Area of the United States located on Prudence, Patience, and Hope islands in Narragansett Bay in the state of Rhode Island.

It was established in August 1980 under the Coastal Zone Management Act. The reserve encompasses 2,353 acres (9.5 km^{2}) of land as well as 1,591 acres (6.4 km^{2}) of water adjoining the islands out to a depth of 18 feet (5.5 m). During the colonial era, all three islands were used for farming. By the 20th century, farming had declined and Prudence Island began to attract summer residents. During World War II, the U.S. military established a presence on the island and remained until 1972, when the land was turned over to the state of Rhode Island.

It encompasses coastal, estuarine, and tidal habitats.

The reserve is managed by the Rhode Island Department of Environmental Management as a federal/state partnership in cooperation with NOAA.

== See also ==
- National Estuarine Research Reserve
