= Despair Island =

Island in Newport County, Rhode Island, United States

Coordinates: 41°36′28″N 71°21′41″W

Despair Island is a small island in Narragansett Bay in Newport County, Rhode Island. It is located between Hope Island and Prudence Island. The island is composed of many outcroppings of rocks used extensively by nesting birds, such as gulls and terns.

Despair Island is marked with a buoy because it is hard to see during daylight hours; it is barely visible at high tide, and the pile of rocks are almost impossible to distinguish between land and water at night. In 2010, two people were killed and three injured when their boat ran aground on the island during a nighttime boat ride.

== History ==
Roger Williams named this and the other islands in Narragansett Bay, and a popular Colonial-period song helped children remember their names:

Prudence, Patience, Hope, and Despair
And little Hog Island, right over there.
