= Oche =

Line behind which the throwing player must stand in darts

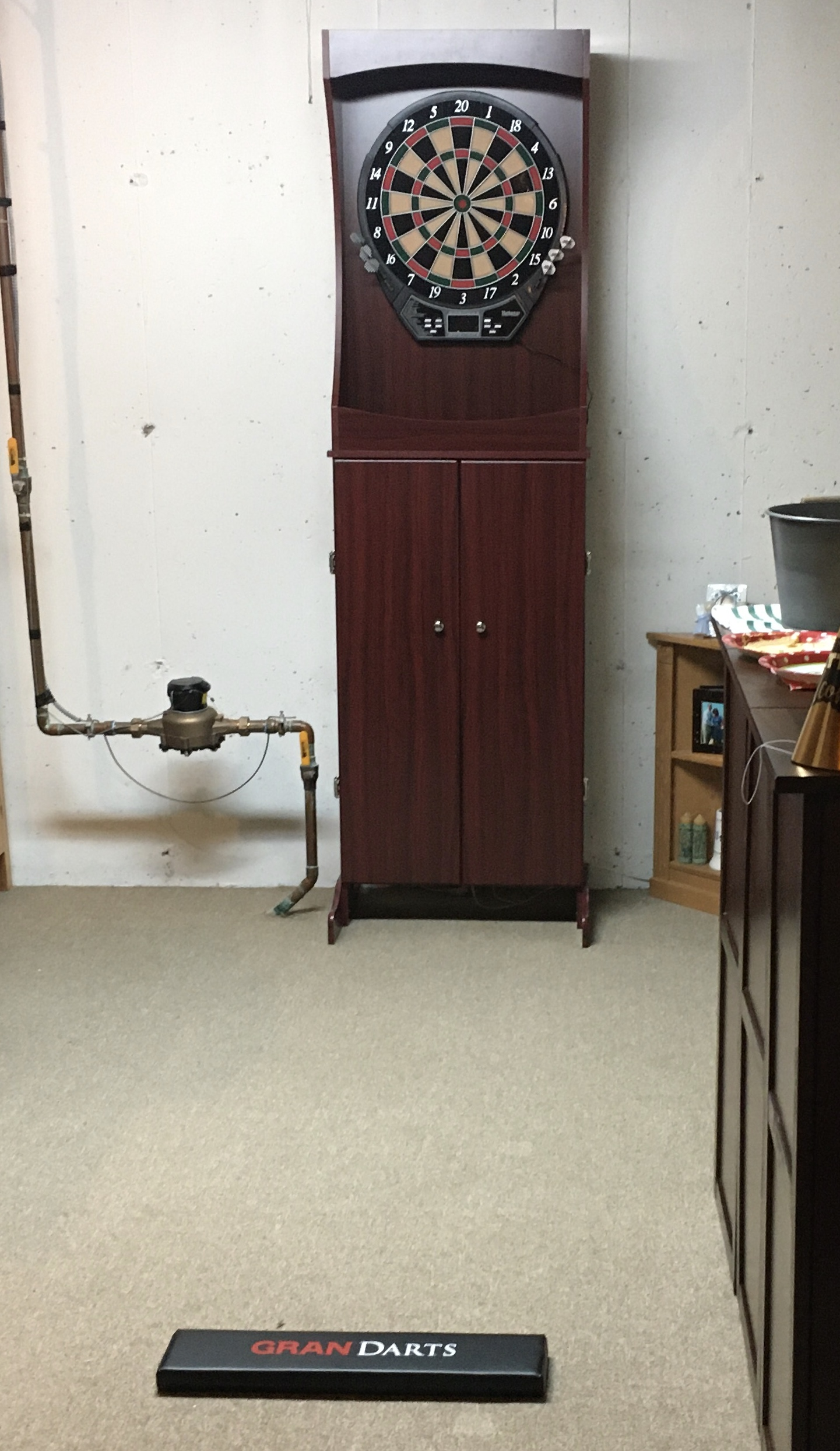
Soft-tip dartboard with an oche

The oche /ˈɒki/, also the throw line or toe line, in the game of darts is the line behind which the throwing player must stand. For steel tip darts, it is generally 7 ft 9 1/4 in (2.37 m) from the face of the dartboard, measured perpendicularly. This is the recognized world standard as set by the World Darts Federation and is used in most areas.

The diagonal distance from the bull's eye to the oche, 9 ft 7 3/8 in (2.93 m), may also be used. In soft tipped darts, the horizontal distance is 8 ft (2.44 m), as set by the American National Dart Association. This was the original distance first standardized by the British Darts Organisation for all darts.

The throwing player must stand so that no portion of either foot extends past the edge of the oche closest to the dartboard. One or both feet may touch any other portion, and the player may lean forward over the oche if desired.

== Origin ==
The origin of the term is unknown, though it probably came into use in the 1920s. It was originally spelled hockey, only becoming oche in the late 1970s.

There is a popular (but unsubstantiated) theory that there was a brewery called "S. Hockey and Sons" in the West Country of England whose beer crates were used to measure out the 9 feet (2.7 m) from the dartboard. This tale is also sometimes associated with the phrase "toeing the hockey". However, according to a statement made by the Brewery History Society in the 1990s, no records of such a brewery can be found.

Another theory traces the term's origin to darts competitions held in the 1920s by an English newspaper, the News of the World. This newspaper used the word hockey for the throwing line in their tournament rules, and may have been the first to do so. Hockey might be derived from the Old English word hocken which meant 'to spit'. It is said that spitting competitions were held in the bars of English public houses, and that the "hockey line" was determined by the length that a given player could spit from a position with his back to the dartboard.

Eric Partridge suggested that the term comes from hoggins line.
