= Patience Island =

Island in the United States of America

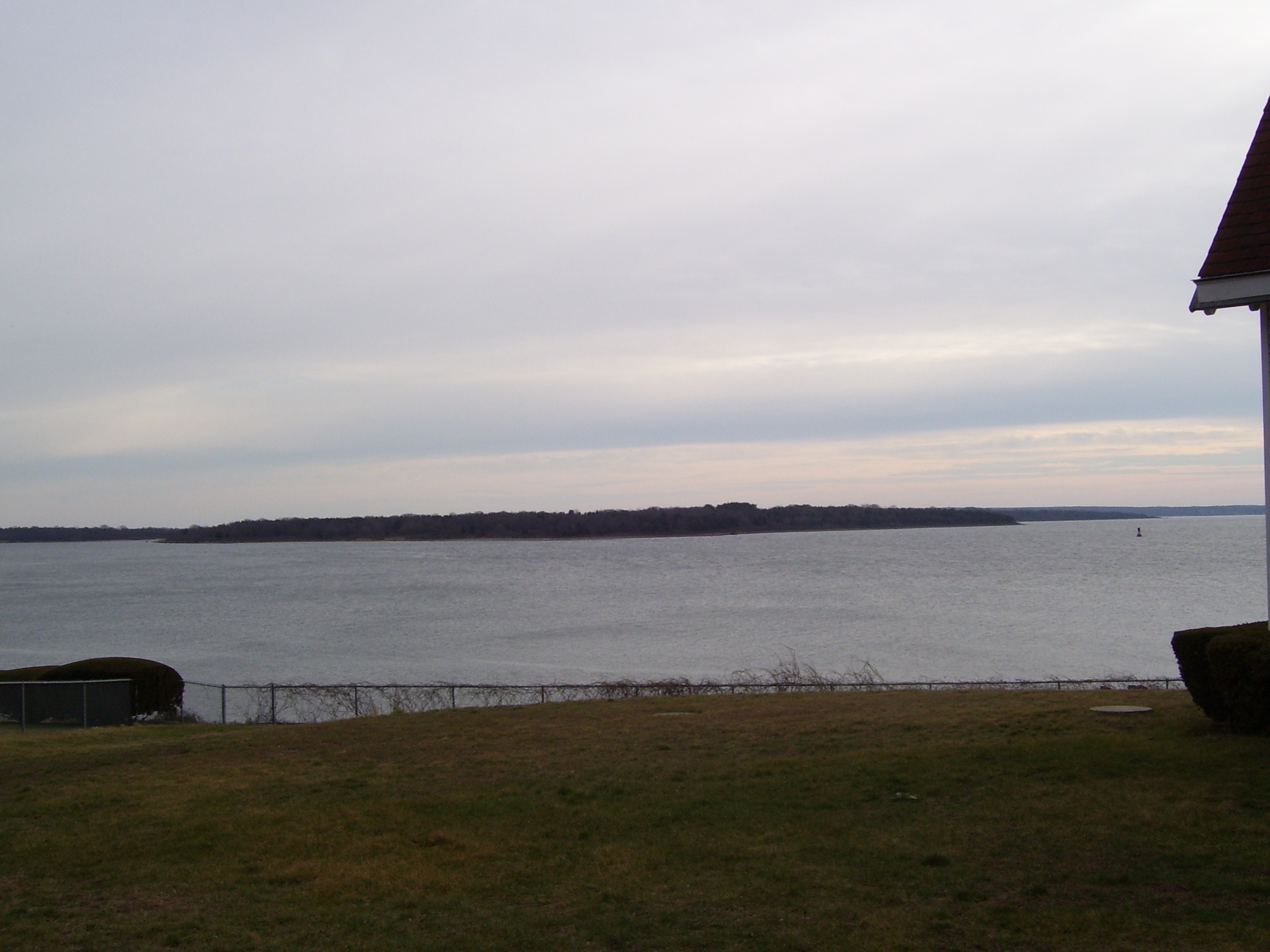
- Patience Island from near Warwick Light.

Geography
- Location: Narragansett Bay
- Area: 0.386 sq mi (1.00 km^{2})
- Highest elevation: 45 ft (13.7 m)

Administration
- United States

Patience Island is an island in Narragansett Bay in Rhode Island in the United States. It is a part of the town of Portsmouth, Rhode Island.

== Geography ==
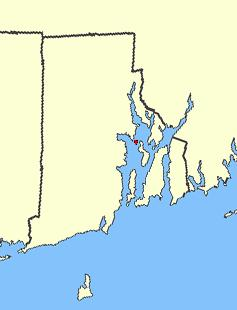
Patience Island, shown in red, in the inner part of Narragansett Bay.

Patience Island lies in Narragansett Bay off the northwest coast of Prudence Island in the town of Portsmouth, Rhode Island. At their closest point, the two islands are only 900 feet (274 m) apart. Patience Island has a land area of 247 acres (100 ha; 0.386 sq mi; 1.00 km^{2}), making it the fourth-largest island in Narragansett Bay. Its highest point is an unnamed location in the west central part of the island at 41°39′23″N 071°21′43″W which is 45 feet (13.7 m) above sea level.

== Population ==
Aside from a single 600-square-foot (56 m^{2}) house, which is disconnected from the state electrical grid, Patience Island is uninhabited. Built in 1972, the house sold for $365,000 in 2021

== Flora and fauna ==
Patience Island is densely overgrown with vines and brush. Brier, Asiatic bittersweet, and poison ivy cover much of the island. Tall shrubs – most commonly bayberry, highbush blueberry, and shadbush — dominate the landscape, interspersed with red cedar and black cherry trees, although a deciduous forest gradually is replacing the shrub habitat in some parts of the island. A small salt marsh lies on the southeastern shore of the island and provides a habitat for seablite, which is common elsewhere in the United States but rare in Rhode Island.

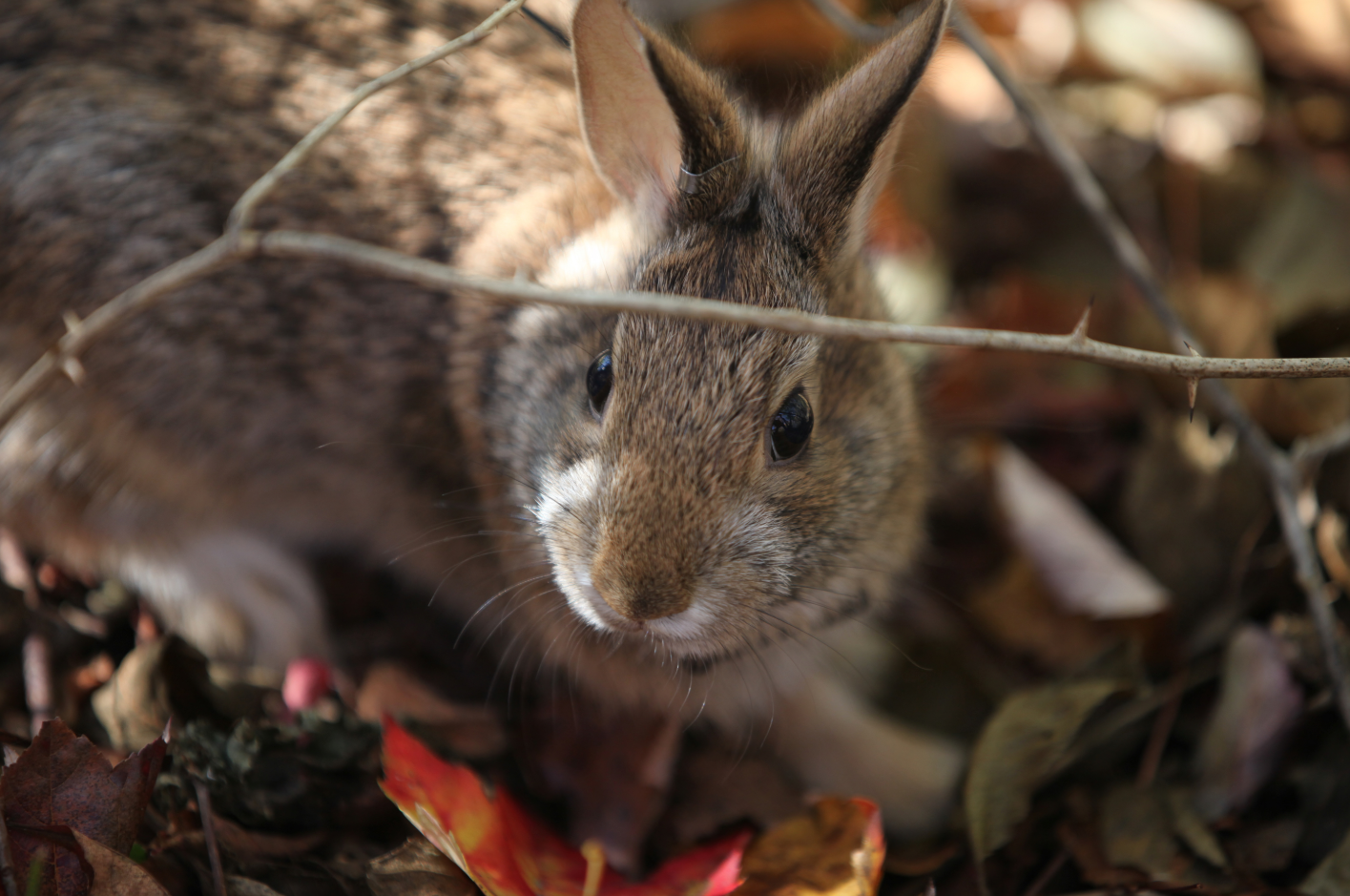
A New England cottontail (Sylvilagus transitionalis) is released on Patience Island on October 30, 2014.

The upland area of Patience Island is home to white-tailed deer, red fox, and eastern cottontail rabbits. Along the island's coast, migratory waterfowl including horned grebes, greater scaup, black ducks, and scoters are common, and quahogs abound in sandy sediment. Ticks are prevalent on the island.

Patience Island is populated by a warren of New England cottontail rabbits (Sylvilagus transitionalis) thanks to a species restoration program related to the animal's candidacy for listing under the Endangered Species Act of 1973. In 2021, one New England cottontail on the island tested positive for tularemia.

== History ==
Patience Island was a gift from the Narragansett Indians to Roger Williams (c. 1603–1683), the founder of the Colony of Rhode Island and Providence Plantations, forerunner of the State of Rhode Island. To memorize the names of Patience Island and other nearby islands, Colonial school children often recited the poem: "Patience, Prudence, Hope, and Despair. And the little Hog over there."

By the mid-17th century, the Patience Island Farm was in operation, and it covered approximately 200 acres (81 ha) of the 247-acre (100 ha) island. British forces burned the farm buildings during the American Revolutionary War (1775–1783). After the war, the buildings were rebuilt and the farm resumed operations.

By the late 18th century, oyster beds were leased in the upper Narrgansett Bay, and probably around that time a house was constructed along the northwest shore of Patience Island for a watchman who monitored the oyster beds. The foundation of the house has survived in good condition as an archaeological site.

Eventually the island came into the possession of Arthur Steere (1865–1943), a Rhode Island politician, businessman, and landowner. Although Steere never lived on the island, his descendants Earle and Clark Steere of The Warwick Cove Marina were the last people to live in the farmhouse on the island.

The farm survived until the early 20th century. During the 1960s, construction of a summer resort colony on the island began. It was never completed, but the construction work inflicted a considerable amount of damage to the sites of the early farm buildings.

== Accessibility ==
People are allowed to visit Patience Island, but camping is not permitted. There is no ferry service to the island, and its trails often are overgrown with vegetation.
