= Hope and Anchor, Welham Green =

Pub in Hertfordshire, England

Coordinates: 51°44′00″N 0°13′04″W

The Hope and Anchor was a grade II listed public house in Welham Green, Hertfordshire. It is based on a 17th-century timber frame with later additions.
