= Hope Island (Rhode Island) =

Island in Narragansett Bay, Rhode Island, US

Coordinates: 41°36′7.54″N 71°22′3.73″W

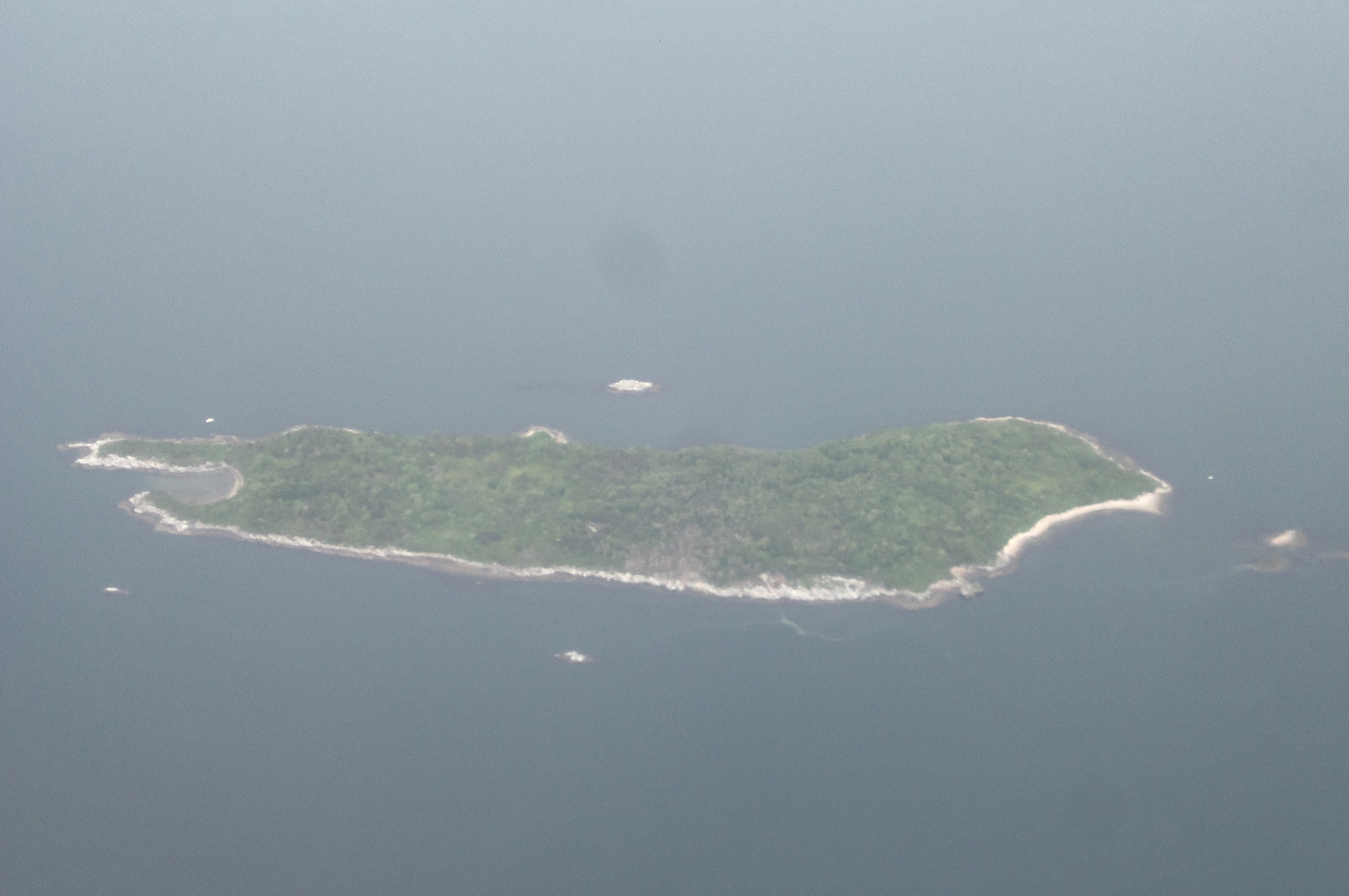
Hope Island

Hope Island is a 91-acre (0.368 km^{2}) island located in Narragansett Bay in the State of Rhode Island. It is part of the Narragansett Bay National Estuarine Research Reserve, along with nearby Prudence Island and Patience Island, and home to colonial wading birds during their nesting season of spring and summer.

== History ==
The island was a gift from Narraganset chief Miantonomi to Roger Williams, the founder of Rhode Island. The word "hope" is the Rhode Island motto and used on the Rhode Island State Seal with an anchor because Williams was inspired by the Biblical passage "hope is the anchor of the soul" in Hebrews 6:19.

The island was transferred to John D. Allen, who walked to the island in winter when the bay was frozen. One day he misjudged the ice thickness, fell in and later died. His widow sold Hope Island to Hiram Aylsworth in September 1873 for $6,000 and included Gooseberry Island, Despair Island, Seal Rocks and Gull Rock as well. Hope Island at the time included a house and other out buildings. The extended Ayslworth family enjoyed it for years. Upon his death, he deeded the property to his two grandsons, Crawford Greene and Aylsworth Brown. It was later taken by the Navy as an ammunition depot for World War I. Aylsworth unsuccessfully sued to return the property to the Brown family. Aylsworth's grandson, Aylsworth Brown, having spent childhood summers on Hope Island purchased property in the Prudence Park area of Prudence where he aptly named his new home “Hopeview.”

The 18th-century farm house on the west side of Hope Island was well enjoyed by the family and the pictures survive. To date, no archaeological work or documentary research has been carried out there. During World War II, the island was used by the U.S. Navy as an ammunition storage site. There are still ammunition bunkers and concrete roads remaining from this period.

Hope Island was acquired by the state in the early 1970s.
