= Hope and Anchor, Hammersmith =

Listed former pub in London, England

Hope and Anchor
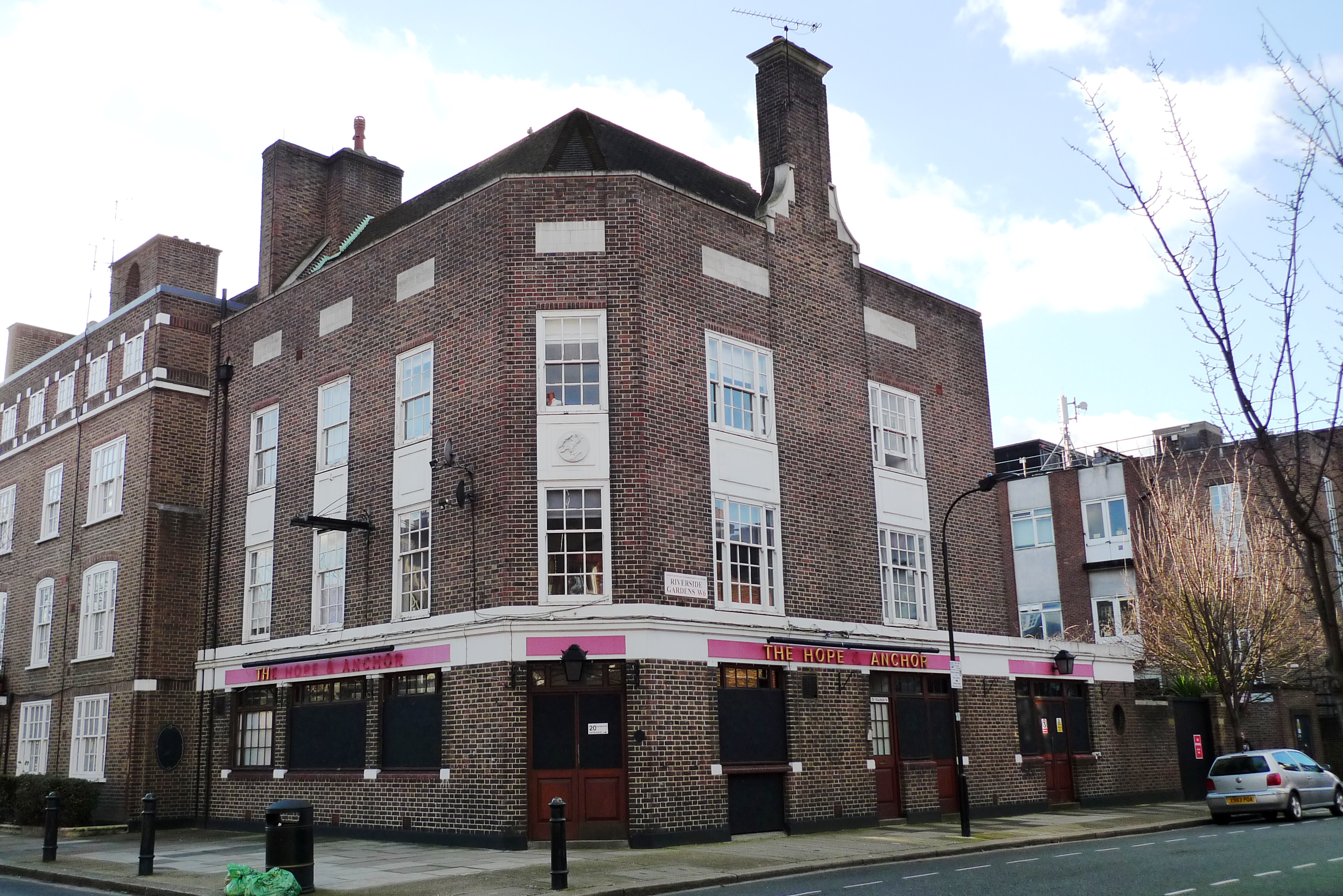
- The former pub in 2014

General information
- Status: Converted to residential use (upper floors)
- Type: Public house (former)
- Architectural style: Neo-Georgian
- Location: 20 Macbeth Street, Hammersmith, London, England
- Coordinates: 51°29′30″N 0°13′55″W
- Year built: c. 1936; 90 years ago
- Closed: 2012
- Client: Truman's Brewery

Design and construction
- Designations

Listed Building – Grade II
- Official name: Hope and Anchor public house
- Designated: 22 April 2005
- Reference no.: 1392791

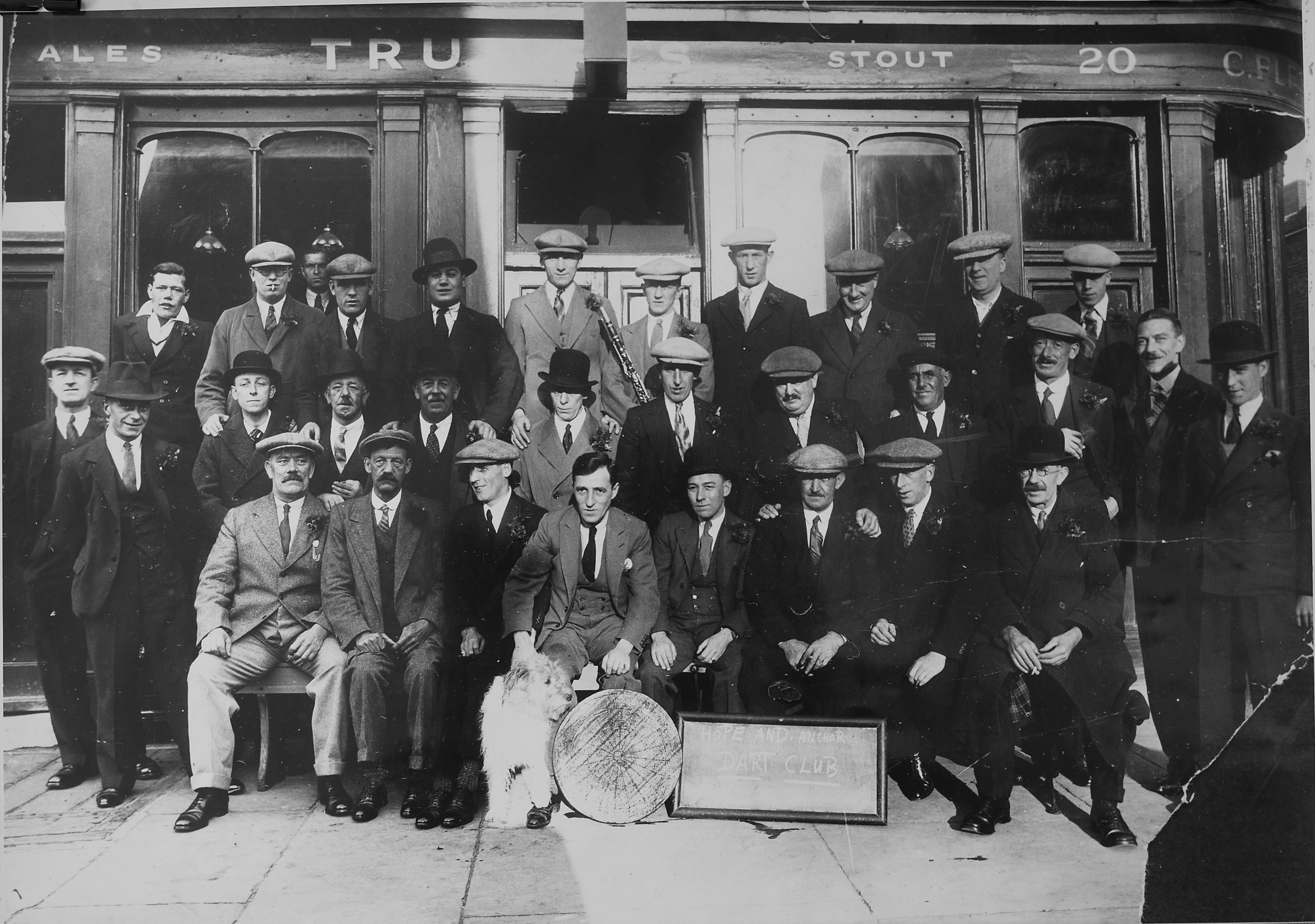
The Hope and Anchor darts club, c. 1936

The Hope and Anchor is a Grade II listed former public house on Macbeth Street in Hammersmith, London, England. Built around 1936 for Truman's Brewery, it is noted for its largely intact interwar interior. The pub is included on the Campaign for Real Ale (CAMRA)'s National Inventory of Historic Pub Interiors and is currently awarded a three-star rating, with its interior described by CAMRA as being of "outstanding national historic importance". The pub closed in 2012, and the ground floor is now used as a television and film location.

== History ==
The public house was built around 1936 for Truman's Brewery, but the architect is not known. It was included on the Campaign for Real Ale (CAMRA)'s National Inventory of Historic Pub Interiors before the inventory's grading system was revised. Under the revised scheme, it is rated three stars and its interior is regarded as being "of outstanding national historic importance".

On 22 April 2005, the Hope and Anchor was designated a Grade II listed building. The pub closed in 2012 and was subsequently advertised to let. In January 2015, Hammersmith and Fulham Council stated that it would monitor the building to prevent the ground floor from acquiring lawful residential use through prolonged occupation. Although the upper floors were occupied, the ground-floor pub premises were no longer trading. Subsequent planning applications have proposed conversion of the property into a single dwelling. As of 2026, the ground floor was being used as a television and film location.

== Architecture ==
=== Exterior ===
The building is constructed of brown brick and has three storeys, with a tiled roof concealed behind a parapet. Designed in a Neo-Georgian style, it was intended to complement the surrounding housing estate.

The Macbeth Street frontage is arranged in three bays, with a chamfered corner entrance leading to a broader two-bay elevation facing Riverside Gardens. A centrally placed chimney with a stone-capped top rises above the latter frontage. At ground-floor level, a continuous rendered cornice extends above timber-framed windows with decorative detailing and brick sills. The corner entrance consists of a pair of doors, above which survives brass signage identifying the public bar.

The upper storeys are lit by sash windows, linked by panels between the floors and beneath decorative plaques set within the parapet. A lower single-storey section extends along Riverside Gardens, containing a pair of doors with brass saloon bar signage flanked by windows. Beyond this, a wall screens a covered colonnade supported by classical columns.

=== Interior ===
The interior retains much of its historic layout and fittings, including the original arrangement of a public bar at the front and a saloon bar to the rear. Both rooms preserve their original bar counters, bar-back fittings and timber panelling, together with surviving Truman's ales signage.

Other surviving features include half-height entrance screens, a Truman's mirror and clocks, fixed seating around the walls, and two brick fireplaces incorporating nautical-themed decorative panels. The saloon bar also retains a tiled spittoon trough. An external entrance between the two bars provides access to the upper floors. The former off-sales window, once located in this area, has been removed.

== See also ==
- List of pubs in London
