= Prudence Island =

Island in Narragansett Bay, Rhode Island, US

Coordinates: 41.6170°N 71.3164°W

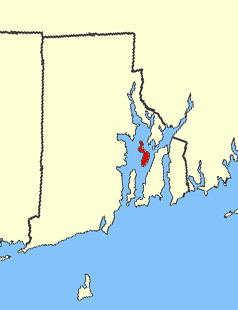
Prudence Island, shown in red, in the inner part of Narragansett Bay; the islands to the south are Conanicut and Aquidneck (formerly called Rhode Island)

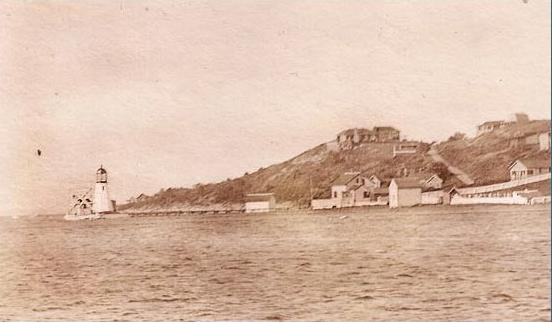
Prudence Island Light in the early 20th century

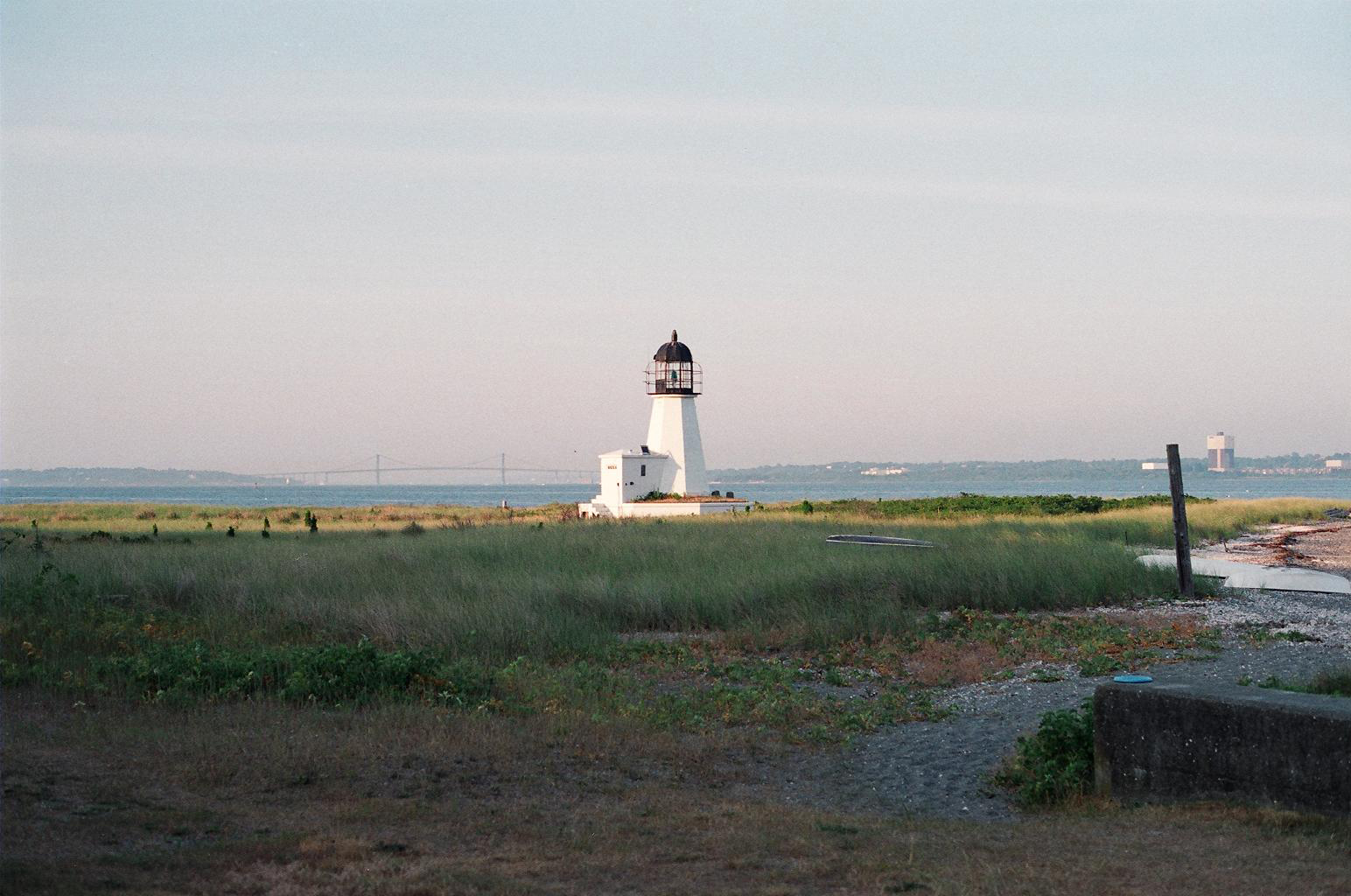
A more recent view of the Prudence Island Light, with the Mt. Hope Bridge in the background

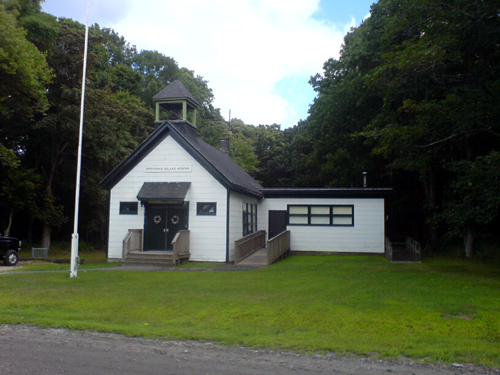
The Prudence Island Schoolhouse, built in 1896 on the corner of Broadway and Mt. Pleasant Ave.

Prudence Island is the third-largest island in Narragansett Bay (after Aquidneck Island and Conanicut Island) in the state of Rhode Island and part of the town of Portsmouth, Rhode Island, United States. Prudence Island is also the largest island in the Bay without road access to the mainland. It is accessible year-round via a ferry service operating from Bristol, Rhode Island.

The island is located near the geographic center of the bay. It is defined by the United States Census Bureau as Block Group 3, Census Tract 401.03 of Newport County, Rhode Island. As of the 2010 census, the population was 278 people living on a land area of 14.43 km^{2} (5.57 sq mi).

== History ==
The Narragansett name for the island was Chibachuweset (or Chibachuwese), and the Narragansetts originally offered to gift it to John Oldham if he would settle there and set up a trading post. Oldham was killed two years later, and Roger Williams and John Winthrop subsequently purchased it from the Narragansett tribe in 1637, with each man retaining a one-half interest. Williams took the northern side of the island, and Winthrop took the southern side.

Williams and Winthrop hoped to farm pigs on the island. Williams named it "Prudence" and shortly afterwards purchased and named nearby Patience Island and Hope Island. He sold his half interest in Prudence Island while in England on behalf of the colony, and Winthrop willed his land to his son Stephen.

In colonial times, the island was used mainly for farming. During the American Revolution, the British forces under Captain James Wallace raided Prudence Island for livestock and engaged in a skirmish with American forces, losing approximately a dozen soldiers. In the 20th century, farming began to decline and the island began to attract summer residents. In World War II, the Navy established an ammunition depot on the southernmost 400 acres (1.6 km^{2}) of the island. In 1972, the Navy turned the base over to the State of Rhode Island, leaving bunkers, roads, and a large deep-water pier.

Several buildings and businesses that once stood on the island were destroyed by the 1938 New England hurricane and Hurricane Carol. As of 2018, the only business in operation on the island is a general store that doubles as the post office. The former naval base is now home to the Narragansett Bay National Estuarine Research Reserve, while Farnham Farm is a national historic site. The island is served by ferry service to Bristol, Rhode Island. Parts of the 2012 film Moonrise Kingdom were filmed on the island and nearby Jamestown.

Prudence Island is the location of Rhode Island's last one-room schoolhouse. It is operated by the Prudence Island School Foundation in cooperation with the Portsmouth school district and educates island children from kindergarten through fourth grade. The school has served the community on the island since 1896, with a six-year hiatus from 1982 to 1989. In 2019, three students were enrolled.

== Summer colonies on Prudence Island ==
There are several different summer colonies on the island. These are in order from the south:

- Prudence Park: on the west side of the island at the western end of Broadway. Development began in 1872 with the building of the Stone Wharf on the west side of the island which became a stop on the Fall River Line steamers running from Providence and Fall River to New York City. Most of the summer homes in this area of the island are fine examples of Victorian and Beaux-Arts architecture, in a similar style to those at Oak Bluffs on Martha's Vineyard. The Stone Wharf was severely damaged and many houses were lost in the hurricane of 1938.
- Bristol Colony: on the east side of the island at the eastern end of Broadway.
- Sandy Point: on the eastern side of the island, along Narragansett Avenue. Site of Prudence Island Light and the Town Dock, and a former landing point for the ferry.
- Homestead: plat of summer homes along the east coast of the island, north of Pier Road, to the north of the former Homestead Casino, which was lost in the hurricane of 1938, now the site of the island's post office, general store, and ferry landing.
- Warnerville: directly north of the Homestead Plat, on Warner Avenue off Narragansett Avenue.
- Boystown Fly-in-Ranch: a small private airport on the northern part of the island.

== In popular culture ==
The Snow Island Trilogy tells the story of a fictionalized version of Prudence Island across two generations. The 2012 film Moonrise Kingdom was filmed in part on Prudence.
