= Esopus Meadows Light =

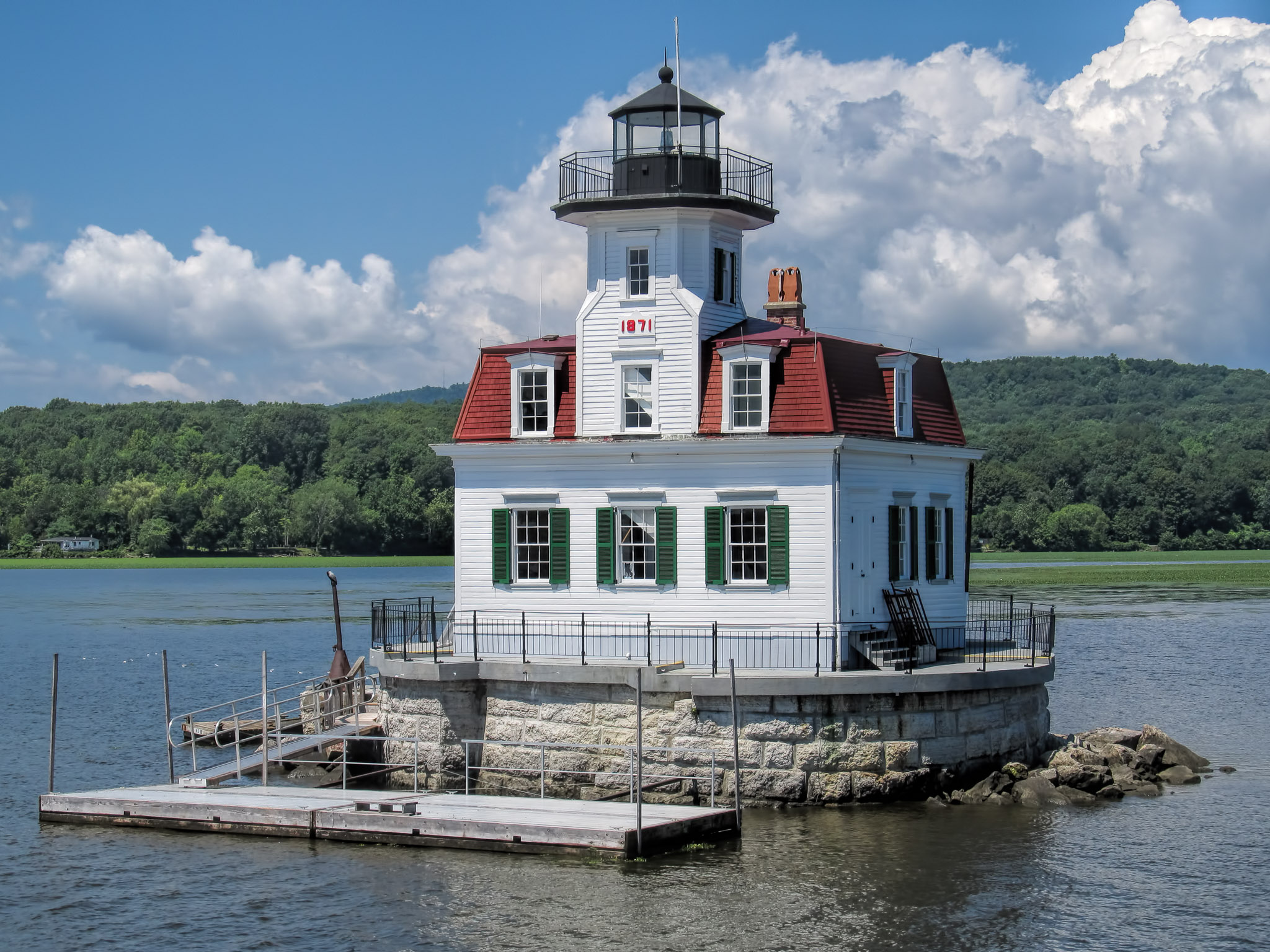
- Location: West side of Hudson River, Esopus, New York
- Coordinates: 41°52′6.2″N 73°56′29.8″W

Tower
- Constructed: 1839
- Foundation: Granite pier on piles
- Construction: Wood
- Automated: 1965
- Height: 17 m (56 ft)
- Shape: Octagonal on square house
- Markings: White house with red mansard roof
- Heritage: National Register of Historic Places listed place
- Fog signal: Bell (Removed)

Light
- First lit: 1872 (current tower)
- Deactivated: 1965–2003
- Focal height: 52 feet (16 m)
- Lens: 5th order Fresnel lens, 1872
- Range: 6 nautical miles (11 km; 6.9 mi)
- Characteristic: Flashing White, 2.5s
- Esopus Meadows Lighthouse
- U.S. National Register of Historic Places
- Area: less than one acre
- Built: 1871
- Architectural style: Second Empire
- MPS: Hudson River Lighthouses TR
- NRHP reference No.: 79001638
- Added to NRHP: May 29, 1979

Esopus Meadows Lighthouse, nicknamed "Maid of the Meadows" and often simply referred to as the Esopus Light or Middle Hudson River Light is an active lighthouse on the Hudson River near Esopus, New York. The lighthouse stands on the west side of the channel, in the river, its granite foundation built atop piles that have been driven into the riverbed, and is accessible only by boat.

Construction of the first lighthouse on the site began in 1838 when the land was ceded for $1.00 by the town of Esopus to the US government and the US government appropriated $6,000 to build the light. The light became active in 1839. It was a twin to the Rondout II lighthouse further north up the Hudson River. By 1867, however, the building was heavily damaged by flood and ice and funds for a new lighthouse were appropriated in 1870.

The current lighthouse was completed in 1871 and is the last wooden lighthouse in existence on the Hudson and the only Hudson lighthouse with a clapboard exterior. It was lit in 1872. One of a group of lighthouses in the Northeast built to an award-winning design by a Vermont architect, Albert Dow, Esopus Meadows Light has sister lights at Rose Island Light, Sabin Point, Pomham Rocks, and Colchester Reef. Esopus Meadows Light was closed in 1965 and by the 1990s it had fallen into a state of disrepair. The most serious problem was the deterioration of the foundation, which had begun to fall apart due to ice damage.

The Save Esopus Lighthouse Commission leased the lighthouse from the United States Coast Guard in 1990 for the purposes of restoration. They eventually took ownership in September 2002, as part of the pilot program for the National Historic Lighthouse Preservation Act. It was added to the National Register of Historic Places in 1979 as Esopus Meadows Lighthouse.

Esopus Meadows Light is shown on the NOAA Chart 12347.

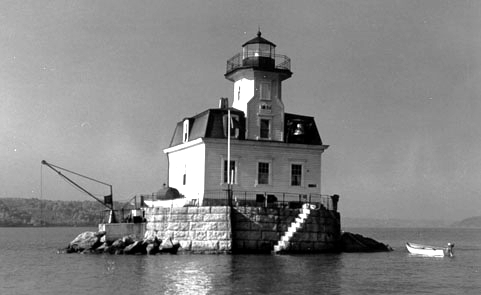

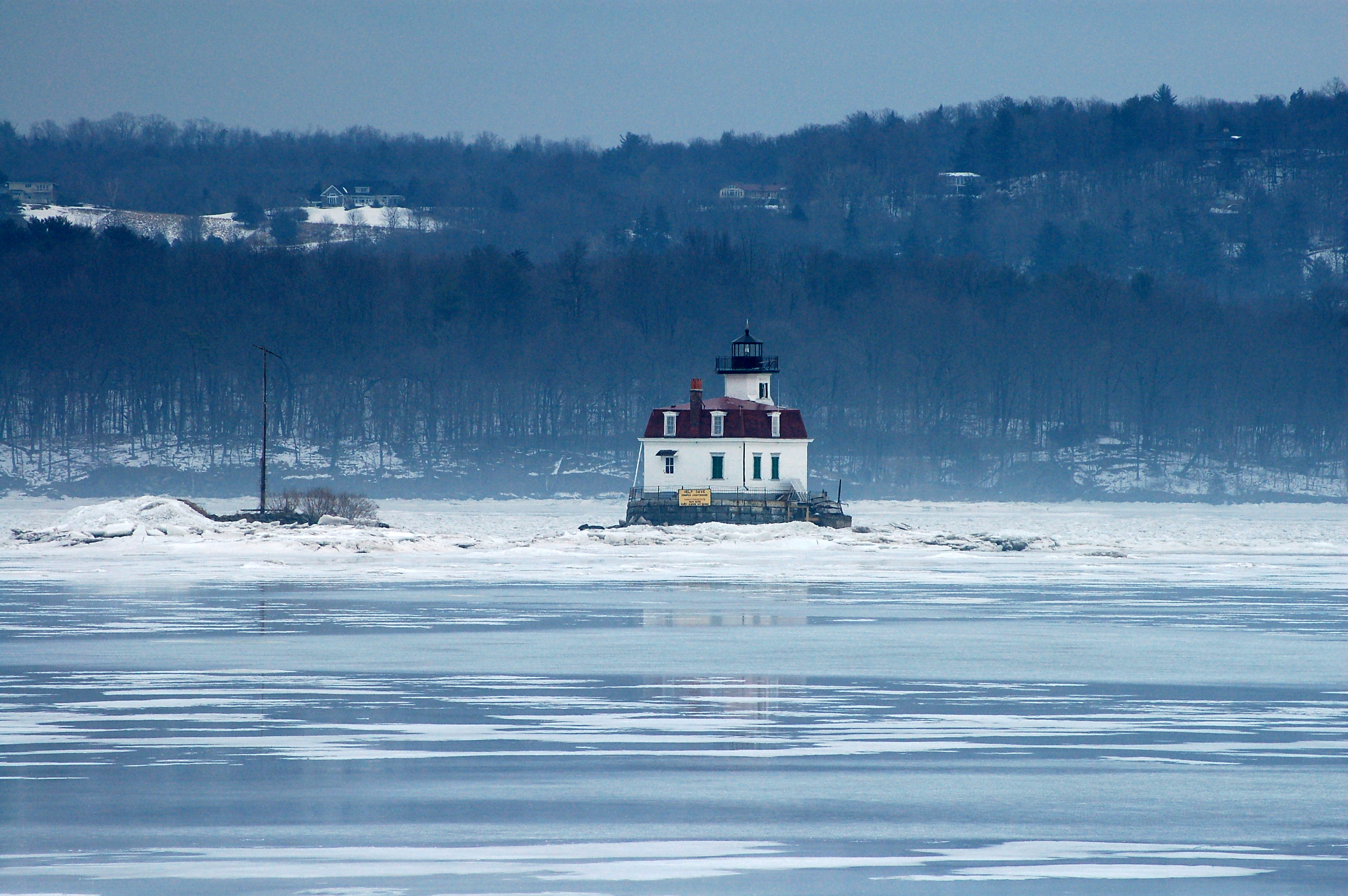
2007

== See also ==
- List of lighthouses in the United States
- National Register of Historic Places listings in Ulster County, New York
