= Fort Hamilton (disambiguation) =

Fort Hamilton is a historic fort in Brooklyn, New York, US.

Fort Hamilton may also refer to:

== Bermuda ==
- Fort Hamilton, Bermuda, a British Army fort in the British Overseas Territory of Bermuda.

== Canada ==
- Fort Whoop-Up, a historic fort near Lethbridge, Alberta, originally named Fort Hamilton.

== United States ==
- Fort Hamilton (Pennsylvania), an 18th-century stockade fort in what is now Stroudsburg, Pennsylvania
- Fort Hamilton High School, a high school in Brooklyn, New York
- Fort Hamilton (Rhode Island), a historic First System coastal defense fortification located on Rose Island in Narragansett Bay, Rhode Island, United States.
- Fort Hamilton (Wisconsin), a frontier fort constructed in present-day Wiota, Wisconsin
- Fort Hamilton, in Hamilton, Ohio
