= Fort Hamilton (Rhode Island) =

- Part of First System of U.S. coastal fortifications
- Rose Island, Narragansett Bay, Rhode Island, U.S.
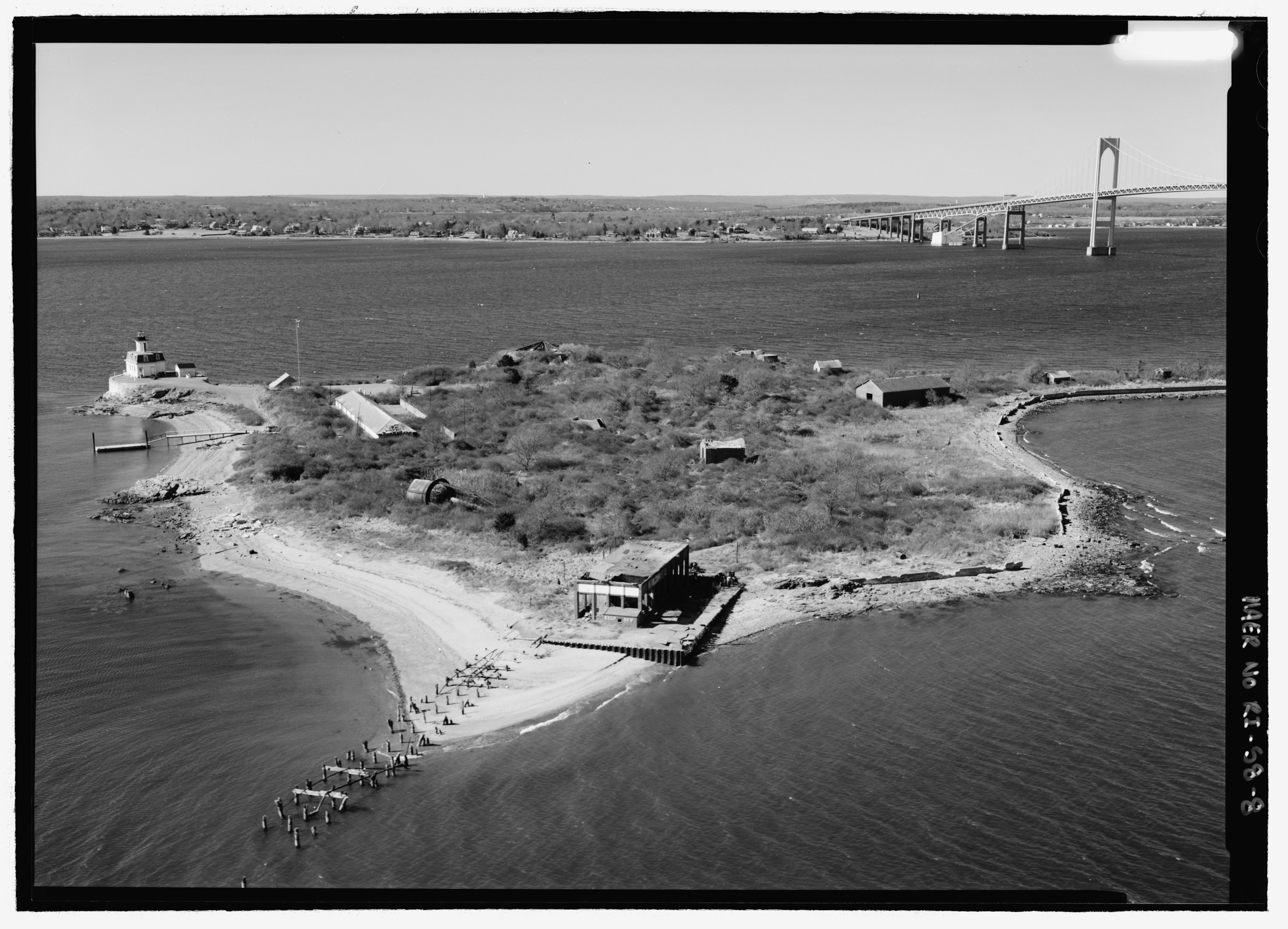
- Aerial view of Fort Hamilton, Rose Island

Site information
- Type: Coastal defense fortification
- Owner: City of Newport, Rhode Island and Rose Island Lighthouse Foundation and Fort Hamilton Trust
- Controlled by: United States (1799–present); France (1780–1781); Great Britain (1776–1779)
- Open to the public: Yes
- Condition: Partially intact; undergoing preservation

Site history
- Built: 1798–1801
- Built by: United States Army Corps of Engineers
- In use: 1798–1801 (construction); later as storage
- Materials: Brick, stone
- Events: American Revolutionary War, War of 1812

Garrison information
- Garrison: United States Army (planned, but never fully operational)

Fort Hamilton is a historic First System coastal defense fortification located on Rose Island in Narragansett Bay, Rhode Island, United States. Constructed between 1798 and 1801 as part of the first federal coastal defense initiative authorized by President John Adams, the fort was never fully completed. It is one of the last surviving First System forts in the nation and retains original bombproof barracks, bastions, and curtain walls. The site has also played roles in the American Revolutionary War and later served as an ammunition depot during the World Wars.

Today, Fort Hamilton is undergoing preservation efforts led by the Rose Island Lighthouse and Fort Hamilton Trust and is open to the public for historical interpretation and educational programs.

== History ==
=== American Revolutionary War (1776–1781) ===
During the American Revolution, British forces occupied Newport, Rhode Island, from 1776 to 1779, establishing defensive positions throughout Narragansett Bay. Rose Island was fortified with a British battery to control maritime access to the harbor.

In 1780, after the British evacuated Newport, French forces under General Lafayette improved the island's defenses as part of the Franco-American alliance. The French constructed a fortification with 40 pieces of heavy artillery, which contributed to the defensive network protecting Newport.

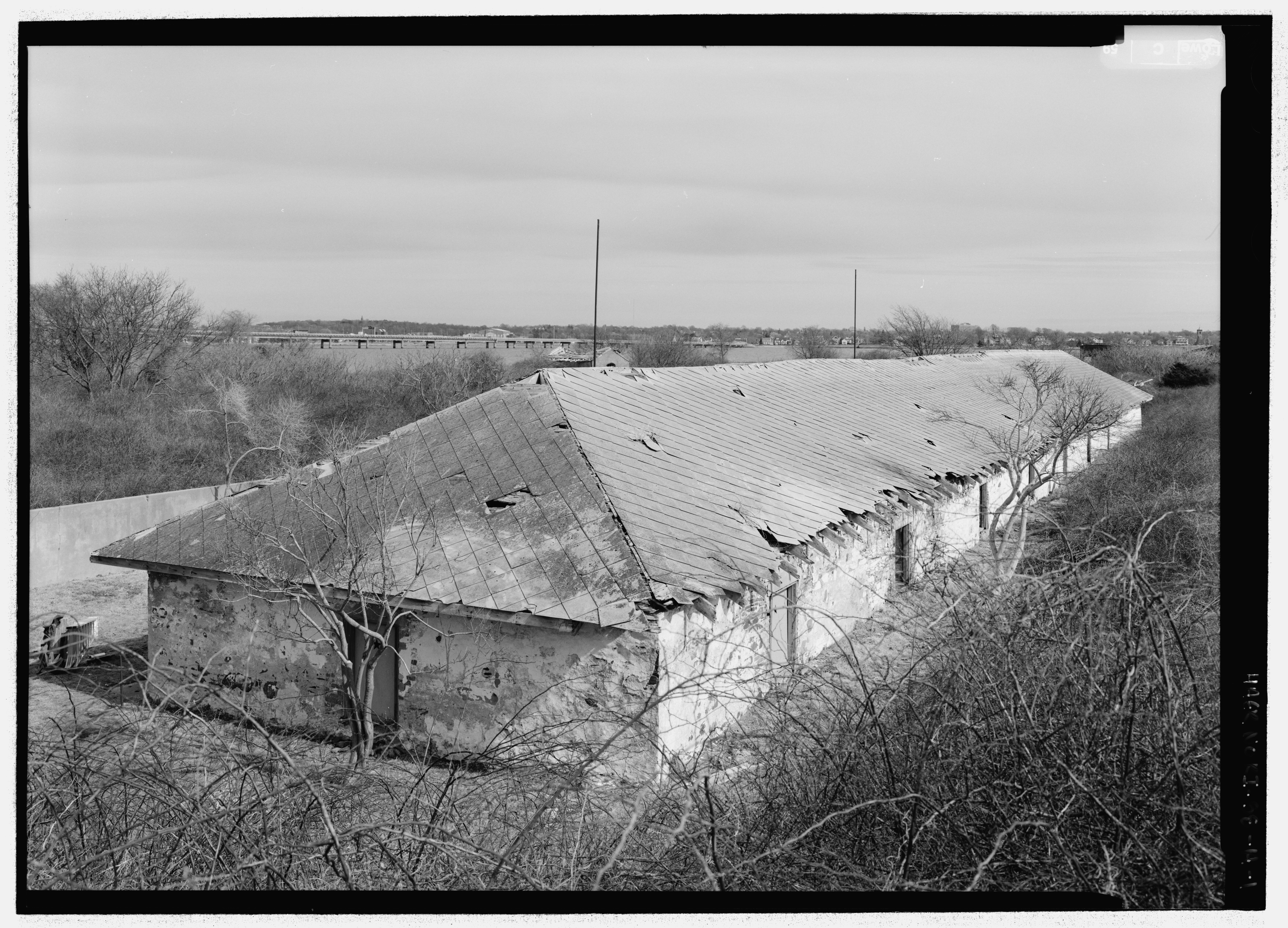
Bombproof barracks, Fort Hamilton, Rose Island, 1968

=== First System construction (1798–1801) ===
In response to growing tensions with France during the Quasi-War, President John Adams authorized the purchase of Rose Island for military use in 1799. Designed by French military engineer Louis Tousard, Fort Hamilton was intended to be the largest defensive structure in Narragansett Bay. Planned features included:

- Four bastions designed for sixty cannons.
- Bombproof barracks, among the first of their kind in the United States.
- Circular bastions, an unusual feature in early U.S. fortifications.

However, in 1801, newly elected President Thomas Jefferson reduced federal military spending, leading to the cancellation of Fort Hamilton's construction before its completion. The fort never became operational, though it remains a rare example of an intact First System fort.

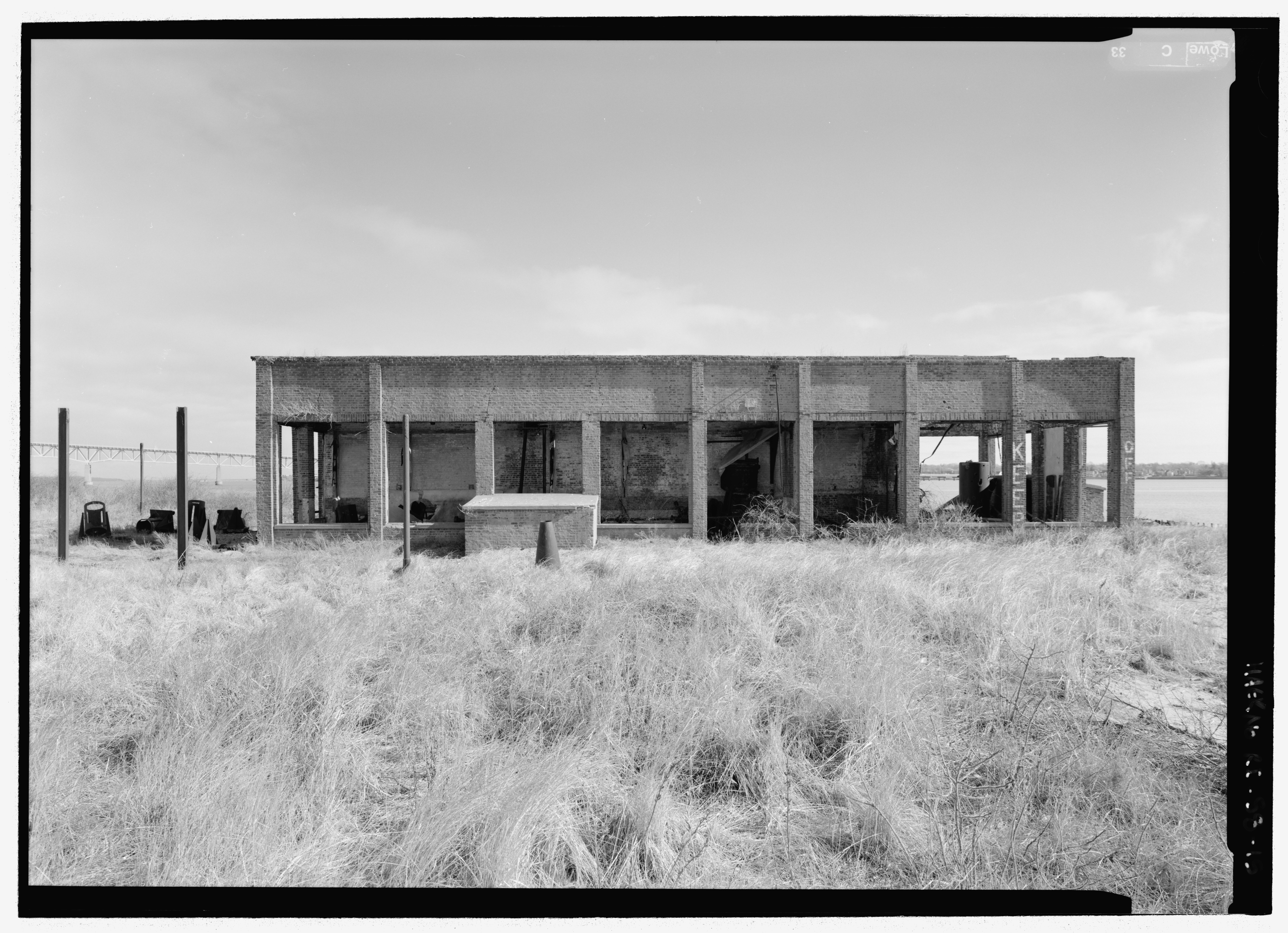
Torpedo filling station, Rose Island, 1968

=== Later uses (19th–20th centuries) ===
Although Fort Hamilton never served its intended military role, the site remained under U.S. government control for nearly two centuries. It was primarily used for ammunition storage during World War I and World War II, with bombproof barracks repurposed as storage facilities.

In the 20th century, the U.S. government transferred ownership of Rose Island in multiple phases. The City of Newport, Rhode Island and the Rose Island Lighthouse and Fort Hamilton Trust now oversee preservation efforts.

== Preservation efforts ==
Since the late 20th century, Fort Hamilton has been the focus of historic preservation efforts. It is part of the Fort Hamilton Historic District, listed on the National Register of Historic Places since 2001. Key preservation efforts include:

- Masonry restoration of the barracks, bastions, and curtain walls.
- Erosion control measures to protect the fort from sea level rise and storm damage.
- Educational programming, including on-site exhibits, historical tours, and virtual resources.
- Plans to establish a permanent museum in the bombproof barracks.

== Connection to HMS Endeavour ==
The site has a direct link to HMS Endeavour, the famed ship used by Captain James Cook. During the Revolutionary War, the British scuttled the ship off the northeast coast of Rose Island in 1776 to block French naval access. This connection further enhances Fort Hamilton's historical significance in maritime and military history.

== See also ==
- Rose Island (Rhode Island)
- Rose Island Light
- Rose Island Historic District
- First System
- Coastal defense
- National Register of Historic Places listings in Newport County, Rhode Island
