= Sabin Point Light =

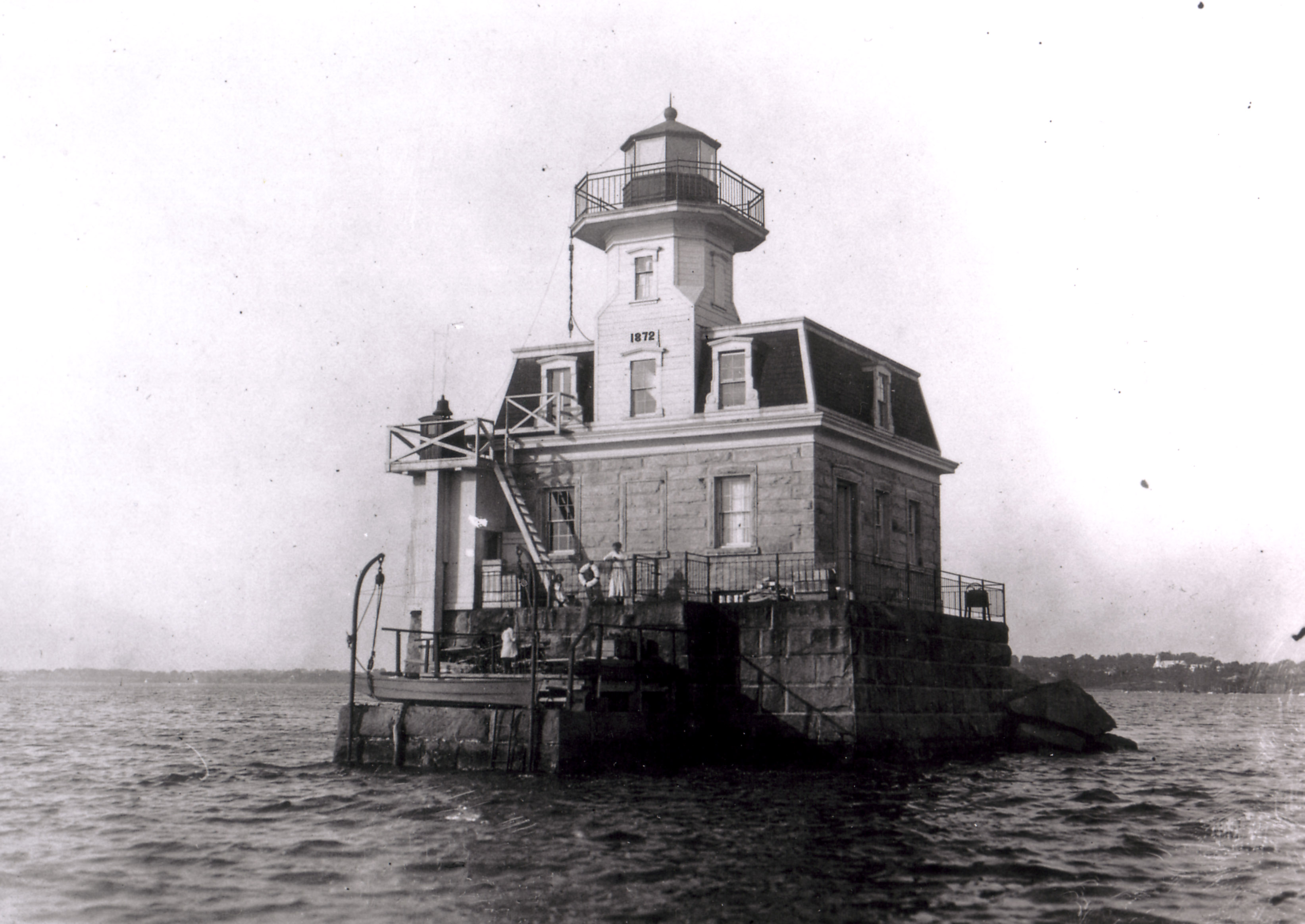
- Sabin Point Light (USCG)
- Location: southwest of Sabin Point in the Providence River
- Coordinates: 41°45′43″N 71°22′27″W (approx.)

Tower
- Constructed: 1872
- Foundation: granite pier
- Construction: granite mansonry
- Automated: 1956
- Height: 36 feet (11 m) (incl. foundation)
- Shape: square house with integral tower

Light
- First lit: 1872
- Deactivated: 1968
- Focal height: 11 m (36 ft)
- Lens: sixth-order Fresnel lens
- Range: 6.5 nautical miles; 12.1 kilometres (7.5 mi)
- Characteristic: fixed red

The Sabin Point Light was a lighthouse located in the Providence River. It was removed as part of a channel-widening project in 1968.

== History ==
This lighthouse was constructed in 1872 to mark a bend in the shipping channel southwest of Sabin Point. The Second Empire style house was constructed according to a plan by Albert R. Dow, which won a design contest sponsored by the Lighthouse Service. Nearly identical lights were also constructed at Colchester Reef, Pomham Rocks, Esopus Meadows Light and Rose Island. Initially, the keeper also had responsibility for the beacon, which was later replaced in 1876 by the Bullock's Point Light.

The lighthouse weathered the hurricane of 1938 fairly well, although it sustained serious flood damage to the first floor. The keeper's wife, Annie Whitford, was washed away three times, but managed to survive and keep the lighthouse operational throughout the storm. On a less perilous note, two of her daughters were married at the lighthouse, with the second marrying the son of the keeper of the Warwick Light.

In 1956, the lighthouse was converted to electricity and automated. In 1968, the widening of the shipping channel led the harbor authority to order the removal of the light. It was burned down, and the foundation razed. An automated beacon was placed on a dolphin nearby; the lighthouse was discontinued in 1989 and replaced with a day beacon.

== See also ==
- Pomham Rocks Light
- Colchester Reef Light
- Rose Island Light
- Esopus Meadows Light
- Warwick Light
- Bullock's Point Light
- List of lighthouses in Rhode Island
- Providence River
