= National Historic Lighthouse Preservation Act =

American law

The National Historic Lighthouse Preservation Act of 2000 (NHLPA; Public Law 106-355; 16 U.S.C. 470w-7) is American legislation creating a process for the transfer of federally owned lighthouses into private hands. It was created as an extension of the National Historic Preservation Act of 1966.

== Background ==
Maintenance of aids to navigation had been assigned to the federal government from the beginning, first under the Department of the Treasury, and then under the U.S. Lighthouse Board (1852–1910) and its successor, the U.S. Lighthouse Service. In 1939 lighthouses were placed under the authority of the United States Coast Guard, which also took over the manning of lights with keepers. Throughout this period the expense of maintaining and staffing lights was constantly stressed. Automation of lights began early in the twentieth century, and a major push in the early 1960s relieved all but a few lighthouses of their keepers.

Lighthouses are fairly high maintenance structures, being subject to marine air and the erosional effects of wave and ice. Unmanned structures were also found vulnerable to vandalism and theft. Therefore, automation of many lights led to their effective demolition. The screw-pile lighthouses of the Chesapeake Bay region were particularly vulnerable due to their wood construction, and only four of these survive out of the several dozen constructed; and of these, only the Thomas Point Shoal Light stands at its original location, the other three having been moved to museum settings.

The expense of maintaining the lighthouses continued to drag on the coast guard budget. On the other hand, there is much sentimental and historical attachment to the lighthouses. Many surviving lighthouses are listed on the National Register of Historic Places. While some lighthouses have been transferred to museums, most are impossible to move.

== The Maine Lighthouse Program ==
In the early 1990s, the Island Institute of Rockland, Maine approached the Coast Guard about acquiring the Heron Neck Light with the intent of restoring the keeper's house, which had been seriously damaged in a fire in 1989. Negotiations dragged on for several years before the institute took charge of the light in 1993; meanwhile, the Coast Guard had announced that it intended to dispose of seven other Maine lighthouses. In 1994 a working group, sponsored by the institute, worked out a program to allow expedited transfers of Maine lighthouses to private concerns, and in 1996 the Maine Lighthouse Program was passed into law by congress. This program was specifically intended to transfer properties to nonprofit groups who would maintain public access to the facilities. In the end twenty-eight light stations were disposed of through this program, which paved the way for the more comprehensive NHLPA.

== Provisions of the Act ==
The NHLPA was enacted in 2000 as an amendment of the National Historic Preservation Act of 1966. It establishes a multiple step process involving the United States Coast Guard, the General Services Administration (GSA), and the National Park Service.

The first step is the determination of the property as "excess to service requirements" by the Coast Guard and its identification as a historic structure. This determination is reported to the GSA and notice is given that application made be made for the structure. In this phase non-profit and/or historical organizations may apply; if application is made and accepted, the lighthouse is simply transferred to the applicant subject to compliance with requirements to maintain the light and make it available to the public. The NPS administers this section of the program.

If no suitable applications are received, GSA may put the structure up for sale at auction.

== History of the program ==
A pilot program was initiated in the Fall of 2001 involving nine lighthouses, eight of which were transferred according to the provisions of the act:

- St. Augustine Light
- Tybee Island Light
- Little River Light
- Cheboygan River Range Front Light
- Munising Front Range Light
- Esopus Meadows Light
- Rondout Light
- Currituck Beach Light

(The ninth, the Sturgeon Point Light, was eventually transferred to the Michigan Department of Natural Resources in 2005.) The following fall the program was expanded, with nineteen additional lights offered. As of June 2007 74 lighthouses have been offered under the provisions of the act, with disposition as follows:

- 2 removed from program at USCG request
- 25 transferred
- 12 recommended for transfer
- 8 sold by GSA at auction
- 4 awaiting GSA disposal
- 10 in application
- 13 announced for availability in 2007

== See also ==
- Grand Haven Light (disambiguation)
- Granite Island (Michigan)
- Lighthouses in the United States
- Little Gull Island Light
- Manistee Pierhead lights
- Minot's Ledge Light
- National Register of Historic Places
- Robbins Reef Light
- Round Island Light (Michigan)
- Waugoshance Light
