= Shoreham Congregational Church =

Historic church in Vermont, United States

- U.S. National Register of Historic Places
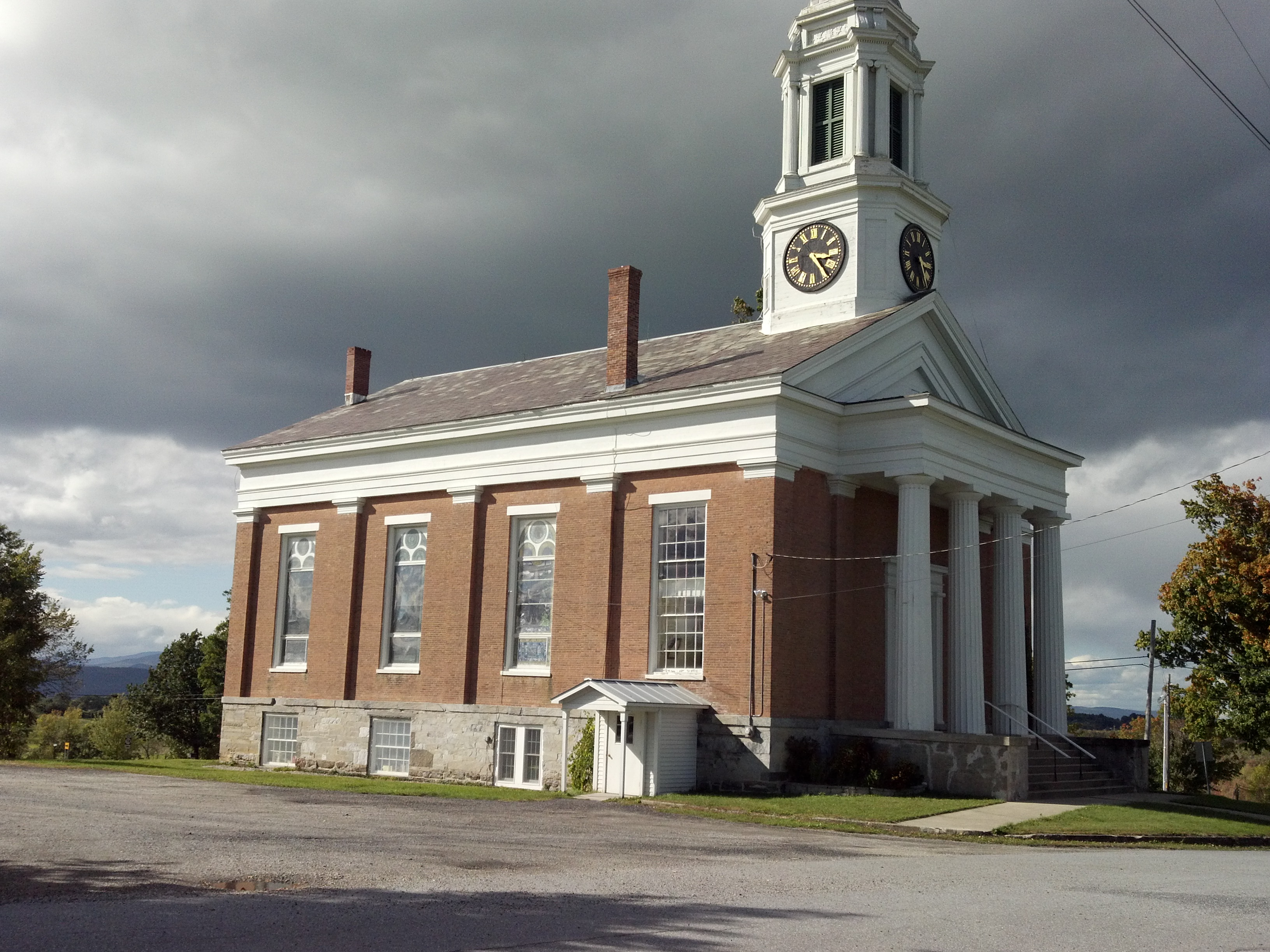

- Location within Vermont Location within the United States
- Location: 28 School St., Shoreham, Vermont
- Coordinates: 43°53′36″N 73°18′59″W
- Area: 1.8 acres (0.73 ha)
- Built: 1846
- Architect: James Lamb
- Architectural style: Greek Revival
- MPS: Religious Buildings, Sites and Structures in Vermont MPS
- NRHP reference No.: 01000211
- Added to NRHP: March 2, 2001

Shoreham Congregational Church is a historic church on School Street in Shoreham, Vermont. Built in 1846 by a local master builder, it is one of the state's finest examples of ecclesiastical Greek Revival architecture, and also housed local town meetings for more than a century. It was listed on the National Register of Historic Places in 2001.

== Description and history ==
The Shoreham Congregational Church is situated prominently in the village center of Shoreham, at the southwest corner of School and Main Streets. It is a single-story brick building, with a gabled roof and stone foundation. Its front has a tall projecting portico, with four fluted Doric columns rising to a full entablature. The door and window bays on the front and sides are articulated by brick pilasters. The gable above the portico is finished with multiple levels of trim. The tower that rises above the front is elaborately styled, with a clock in the first stage and belfry in the second. Its stages are basically square, with chamfered corners featuring panel sections on the clock stage and paired miniature Ionic columns on the belfry stage. The tower is capped by an octagonal slate roof and weathervane.

The first church congregation was organized in Shoreham in 1794, and its first meeting house was built in 1800. In the first half of the 19th century, Shoreham became a remarkably prosperous agricultural community, its success derived from widespread cultivation of merino sheep. In 1846, the present edifice was constructed under the supervision of Jacob Lamb, a regionally well-known master builder, whose other credits include the Wilcox-Cutts House in Orwell, another of the state's finest Greek Revival buildings. The building's design is an original combination of designs taken from the publications of architect Asher Benjamin. The building's location on the town green was approved by the town, which requested permission to hold town meetings in the new building's basement. This use continued until 1956, when the meeting was moved to the local school.

== See also ==
- National Register of Historic Places listings in Addison County, Vermont
