= Electra Havemeyer Webb Memorial Building =

Coordinates: 44°22′29.74″N 73°13′51.6″W

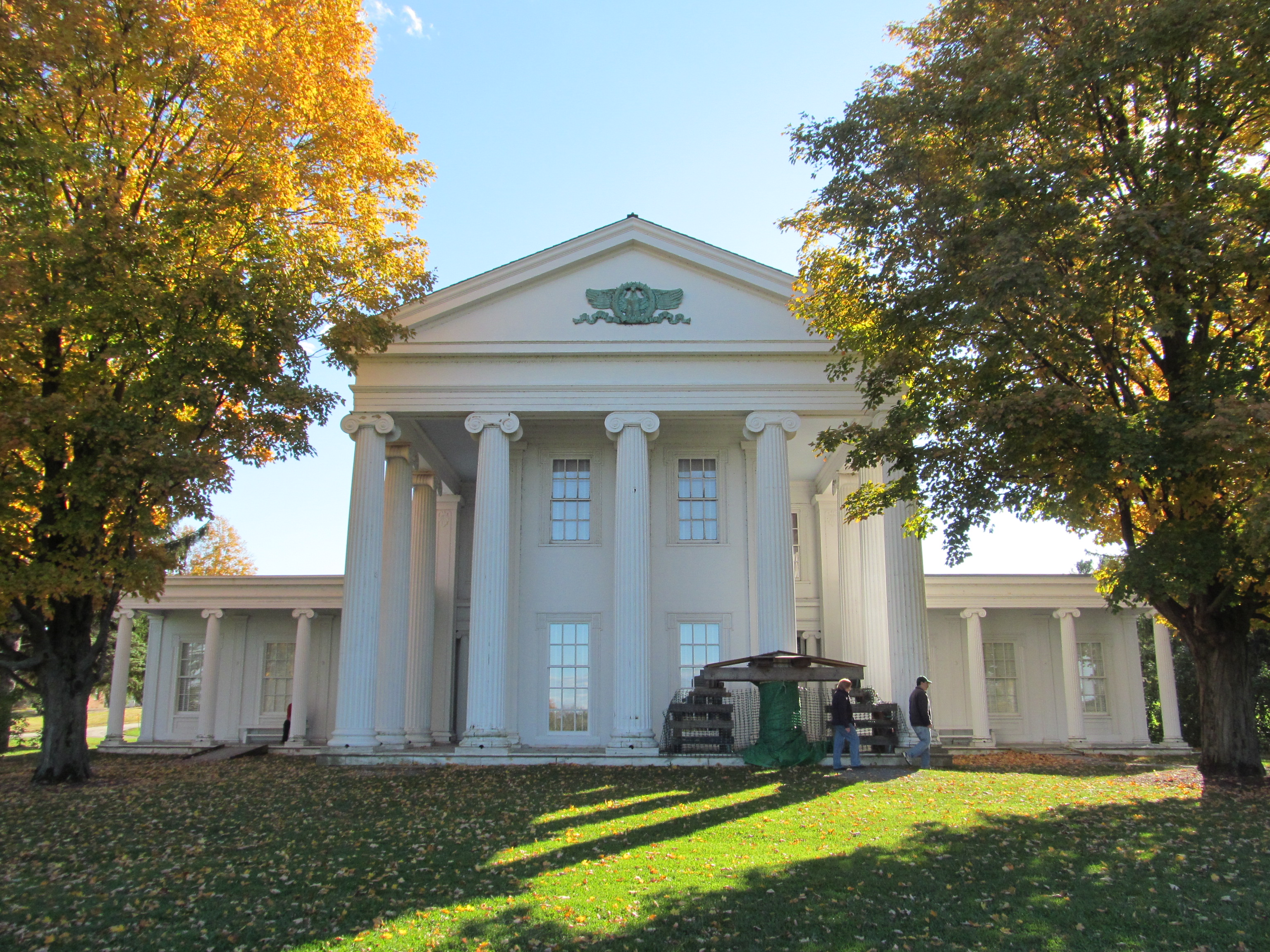
Electra Havemeyer Webb Memorial Building

The Electra Havemeyer Webb Memorial Building is an exhibit building located at the Shelburne Museum in Shelburne, in the U.S. state of Vermont. It was built as a memorial to the museum's founder, Electra Havemeyer Webb, and her husband, James Watson Webb II. It is home to the museum's European Paintings Collection. The collection is shown in six period rooms relocated from Electra and J. Watson Webb's 1930s New York City apartment at 740 Park Avenue.

== History ==
In 1960, Electra Havemeyer Webb's children erected the Electra Havemeyer Webb Memorial Building in honor of the museum founder. Completed in 1967, the Memorial Building's silhouette duplicates that of the 1843 Wilcox-Cutts House in Orwell, Vermont. The Memorial Building represents the architectural idiom known as Greek Revival. It was a style pervasive in the United States, gaining prominence in the second quarter of the 19th century and reaching its peak of popularity by 1850.

Drawing inspiration from Grecian temples, Greek Revival architects adopted the rectangular structure of colonial houses and reoriented it so that the triangular gables would run parallel, rather than perpendicular, to the road. Anchoring the pedimented facade with a heavily columned, often two-storied porch, and sometimes flanking the main gable with mirroring wings, such as in the Memorial Building, architects achieved the proportion and symmetry of the ancient structures that inspired them.

== Collections ==
=== Bronze sculptures ===
The Shelburne Museum's bronze collection focuses on small decorative bronzes. Bronze castings of exotic animals by French artist Antoine-Louis Barye can be seen in the Electra Havemeyer Webb Memorial Building. His small sculptures of elephants, crocodiles and lions are displayed in the library. Barye spent hours at the Paris zoo sketching the anatomy of animals to accurately reproduce them in bronze. His sculpture elephant and driver, located in the foyer captures the rough skin of an elephant and the contrasting soft cloth costume of his driver.

On the first floor, there are two Edgar Degas bronzes. The horse and rider combinations were originally modeled in wax and later cast in bronze (after the artist's death in 1917). Degas' studies of horses and jockeys was a way to explore the effects of form, space, and motion.

In the basement of the Electra Havemeyer Webb Memorial Building there is a collection of 19th and 20th century American bronzes. It features work by such western artists as Charles Marion Russell and Harry Jackson; these artists, who often served as cowhands and guides of the western plains, modeled their work after real people and personal experiences. Their bucking broncos, cowboys, and portraits of Native Americans are romantic interpretations of a vanishing American west.

=== European paintings ===
The Shelburne Museum's collection of fine art includes objects originally in the collection of Henry O. Havemeyer and Louisine Elder Havemeyer, parents of Electra Havemeyer Webb who inherited the collection from them. The European painters still represented by the collection include Rembrandt van Rijn, Édouard Manet, Claude Monet, Edgar Degas, and Mary Cassatt. The Havemeyers were among the first American collectors of French Impressionist painting and amassed one of the most important collections of Old Masters and Impressionist paintings on American soil.

The French artist Édouard Manet (1832–1883) felt strongly that keen observation made a great painter. A brilliant technician who used broad strokes of paint as comfortably as he did minute dabs of color, Manet explored ideas about light that set the stage for the Impressionist movement. He completed Blue Venice while touring Italy in 1874. His dashes of paint create the effect of sunlight sparkling on water; on the gondolier, Manet used multiple strokes of color to create a three-dimensional effect.

Claude Monet (1840–1926), a prominent leader of the Impressionist movement, stressed the importance of working outdoors and letting art illustrate the color and movement of the natural environment. Five landscapes by Monet are included in the museum's collection. In the 1880s and 1890s Monet captured the changing effects of natural light by creating series of paintings of the same subject in different weather and light conditions. His Haystacks in the Snow is part of a series of over thirty paintings of haystacks.

Pastels, soft, colorful chalks, were perfected by the French in the 19th century. Edgar Degas is considered one of the founders of Impressionism though he preferred to be considered a Realist. Degas's work differed from other Impressionists; while Monet concentrated on the effects of light and shadow, Degas focused on unusual perspectives and complex formal structures. The Shelburne Museum has seven Degas works in the collection, which can be seen in the Electra Havemeyer Webb Memorial Building.

Mary Cassatt, the one American Impressionist in the collection, had close ties to the Havemeyer and Webb families. Louisine Elder Havemeyer, Electra Havemeyer Webb's mother, was a close friend to Cassatt, who played a large role in shaping the Havemeyers' French Impressionist collection. The Memorial Building includes a Cassatt portrait of the museum's founder, Electra Havemeyer Webb, and her mother Louisine Elder Havemeyer.

=== Furniture ===
The Shelburne Museum's furniture collection represents the different styles and tastes of 18th and 19th century America. It includes examples of the most sophisticated urban furniture produced in the nation as well as many simpler pieces made by country cabinetmakers for use in rural homes. These country pieces include one of the greatest strengths of the museum – its collection of paint-decorated furniture.

During the American industrial revolution (ca. 1865-1900) the furniture industry, like every other major industry, was mechanized. Individual craftspeople and designers like Louis Comfort Tiffany, whose work can be seen in the Memorial Building, continued to work for upper class patrons, but inexpensive, factory-made chairs, tables, beds, and stands flooded an eager market of middle-class Victorians. The popularity of carved decoration and elaborate upholstery, characteristic of the period, can be seen on the furniture displayed in the parlor of the Lighthouse and on the promenade deck of the Ticonderoga steamboat.
