= Honoré Blanc =

- Born: 1736; Avignon, Papal States
- Died: 1801 (aged 64–65)
- Occupation: Firearms designer

Honoré Blanc (1736-1801) was a French gunsmith and a pioneer of the use of interchangeable parts. He was born in Avignon in 1736 and apprenticed to the gun-making trade at the age of twelve. His career spanned the decades from circa 1750 to 1801, a time period that included the reigns of Louis XV and Louis XVI, the American Revolution (which received military aid from Louis XVI), the French Revolution, and the French First Republic.

== Mass production innovation ==
In the middle of the eighteenth century, Honoré Blanc was inspired by the work of French artillerists led by Jean-Baptiste Vaquette de Gribeauval, who had begun pursuing interchangeability in artillery. Their Gribeauval system involved standardization of cannons and shells. Blanc applied these concepts to muskets, and used gauges and filing jigs to bring duplicate parts to interchangeability. The uniformity of the parts was achieved via cut-and-try methods, using jigs, gauges, and master models to guide hand filing (there was no true milling at the time, although rotary filing on lathes was not unknown). As each part was filed, it was repeatedly compared against a gauge or master model (one part declared the model for all others to compare with), and the natural ability of the eyes and hands to detect small differences, such as a slight step up or down from the master to the part, ensured sufficient interchangeability.

When Blanc tried to interest fellow European craftsmen in the concept, they were unreceptive, due to a combination of skepticism as to the system viability and some amount of fear that their employment and/or status might be threatened by it if it did work. So Blanc turned to Thomas Jefferson, at that time the US Minister to France; Jefferson quickly realized that such a system would free America from dependence on European sources for military equipment. Jefferson tried to persuade Blanc to move to America, but was not successful, so he wrote to the American Secretary of War with the idea, and when he returned to the USA he worked to fund its development. President George Washington approved of the idea, and by 1798 a contract was issued to Eli Whitney for 12,000 muskets built under the new system.

Blanc's work, and that of other French military officers led first by General Gribeauval and later by Major Louis de Tousard (who took his ideas with him into the newly established American military), formed the basis for the later development of interchangeable manufacture by the American military and its civilian contractors.

Blanc, and the interchangeable musket parts experiment, is highlighted in a multi-page footnote in Mémoire sur la fabrication des armes portatives de guerre by Gaspard Hermann Cotty (1806). There were "50 or 60" rifles and LeBlanc first developed the technique in 1777, demonstrating it just before the French Revolution. Roe (1916) mentions an unknown French inventor in whose work Thomas Jefferson took an interest circa 1785 and remembered years later as a "Mr Le Blanc". Hounshell (1984) confirms that this inventor was Honoré Blanc.

== Bibliography ==
- Althin, Torsten K.W. (1948). C.E. Johansson, 1864–1943: The Master of Measurement. Stockholm: Ab. C.E. Johansson [C.E. Johansson corporation]. LCCN 74219452.. Carl Edvard Johansson was the inventor of gauge blocks.
- Hounshell, David A. (1984), From the American System to Mass Production, 1800–1932: The Development of Manufacturing Technology in the United States, Baltimore, Maryland: Johns Hopkins University Press, ISBN 978-0-8018-2975-8, LCCN 83016269, OCLC 1104810110
- Roe, Joseph Wickham (1916), English and American Tool Builders, New Haven, Connecticut: Yale University Press, LCCN 16011753. Reprinted by McGraw-Hill, New York and London, 1926 (LCCN 27-24075); and by Lindsay Publications, Inc., Bradley, Illinois (ISBN 978-0-917914-73-7).
