= Sunset Island =

Coordinates: 44°33′53.0″N 73°19′24.5″W

Sunset Island is a three-acre island on Lake Champlain, located just west of the Greater Mallets Bay, Colchester, Vermont, United States. It is currently privately held, with Patricia McDonald as the majority owner.

Originally named Hogback Island, the property was used by the caretaker of the Colchester Reef lighthouse for farming from 1871 until the lighthouse was decommissioned in 1933. In 1956, after the lighthouse had been relocated to the Shelburne Museum, Sunset Island went up for auction and was purchased by John McDonald and 3 other sportsmen to be used predominantly for duck hunting.

There are no facilities on the island besides a one-room cabin left over from the lighthouse era that is used to store maintenance and landscaping requirements.
