= Colchester Reef Light =

Lighthouse in Vermont, US

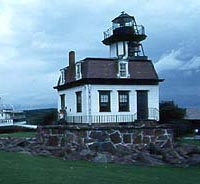
- The light at the museum (NPS)
- Location: Originally west of Colchester Point in Lake Champlain; now on grounds of Shelburne Museum
- Coordinates: 44.3753°N 73.2314°W (current); 44.5550°N 73.3293°W (original)

Tower
- Constructed: 1871
- Foundation: Granite pier
- Construction: Wood frame
- Height: 35 feet (11 m)
- Shape: Square house with tower on front of roof
- Markings: White w/ dark trim

Light
- Deactivated: 1933
- Lens: Sixth order Fresnel lens

The Colchester Reef Light in Vermont was a lighthouse off Colchester Point (northwest of Burlington, Vermont) in Lake Champlain. It was moved to the Shelburne Museum in Shelburne, Vermont, in 1956.

In 1869 the United States Lighthouse Service commissioned the building of the Colchester Reef Lighthouse on Lake Champlain to protect ships from the "Middle Bunch Reef", comprising the Colchester Reef, the Colchester Shoals, and the Hogback Reef.

== Architecture ==
This lighthouse was one of a group of New England lighthouses built to the same plan. Nearly identical lighthouses were constructed at Esopus Meadows Light in New York and Sabin Point, Pomham Rocks, and Rose Island, all three located in Rhode Island waters.

In the mid-nineteenth century, due in large part to the booming lumber business, which relied on easy shipping of raw timber from Canada to planing mills in western Vermont, commerce on Lake Champlain significantly increased. To protect ships in potentially hazardous waterways, the Lighthouse Service held a national competition for lighthouse designs, and Albert R. Dow, a Burlington native from the University of Vermont, won the commission. The Lighthouse Service implemented Dow's designs in building the Colchester Reef Lighthouse, which marked the reef consisting of several groups of exposed rocks northwest of Colchester Point. It was completed in 1871.

Because the lighthouse needed to endure the lake's strong winds and heavy winter ice-floes, Dow pegged and bolted together the lighthouse's twenty-five-foot square stone foundation, post-and-beam frame and tower, and slate and tin roof. Dow then secured the entire building with one and a half inch thick iron rods to assure its stability. Despite Dow's focus on the building's framework, he ornamented his lighthouse with a mansard roof and scrolled window frames typical of the then-fashionable French Second Empire style. A sixth order Fresnel lens exhibited a fixed red light beginning in 1871.

== Use ==
The lighthouse served as both the home and workplace of eleven successive keepers and their families. The first floor was divided into a living room and kitchen and the second floor into four bedrooms. Coal stoves provided heat, while large pumps retrieved water from the lake. The keepers used the nearby island to the north, Hogback Island, as farmland. The island was auctioned off in 1956 after the lighthouse was decommissioned and was renamed Sunset Island.

The exposed location and northerly climate meant that ice figured heavily in incidents involving the lighthouse. In one instance, the keeper's wife went into labor in January 1888. Summoned by the fog bell, the doctor and his assistant attempted to cross the ice, but were blown north when it broke up, eventually landing safely at South Hero Island (also known as Grand Isle), 4 miles (6 km) to the north. The baby was safely born with the father assisting alone.

== The move ==
In 1933 the Lighthouse Service decommissioned the Colchester Reef Lighthouse after the automatic electric beacon made the hand-operated system obsolete. Over the years the light suffered damage from ice floes and gradually fell into disrepair. Nineteen years later, in 1952, it was put up for auction and sold to Mr. & Mrs. Paul and Lorraine Bessette of Winooski, Vermont, for $50, to be dismantled for timber to construct a home. After this sale, Vermont historian Ralph Nading Hill ferried Electra Havemeyer Webb to the now-derelict lighthouse. Entranced, she persuaded the Bessettes to sell it for $1,300 and substitute building materials. Webb purchased the lighthouse and had it moved to the museum grounds in the fall. Undaunted by the hazards involved, her veteran crew catalogued each piece of the building before moving the heavy beams, stairways, doors, and windows to reconstruct the building on museum grounds.

The Coast Guard donated the lens, fog bell, and striking mechanism, and in 2006 assisted with the mounting of a modern solar-powered beacon in the lantern, allowing the beacon to be lit for the first time since its decommissioning. With the house removed, a modern steel tower was mounted on the pier.

== Collection ==
=== Furniture ===
Shelburne Museum's furniture collection represents the different styles and tastes of 18th and 19th century America. It includes examples of the most sophisticated urban furniture produced in the nation as well as many simpler pieces made by country cabinetmakers for use in rural homes. These country pieces include one of the greatest strengths of the museum – its collection of paint-decorated furniture.

During the American industrial revolution (ca. 1865–1900) the furniture industry, like every other major industry, was mechanized. Individual craftspeople and designers like Louis Comfort Tiffany, whose work can be seen in the Electra Havemeyer Webb Memorial Building, continued to work for upper class patrons, but inexpensive, factory-made chairs, tables, beds, and stands flooded and eager market of middle-class Victorians. The popularity of carved decoration and elaborate upholster, characteristic of the period, can be seen on the furniture displayed in the parlor of the Colchester Reef Light.
