= Bullock's Point Light =

- Location: southwest of Bullock's Point in the Providence River
- Coordinates: 41°44′15.72″N 71°21′51.12″W

Tower
- Constructed: 1876
- Foundation: Granite pier
- Construction: Wood frame
- Automated: 1940
- Height: 35 feet (11 m)
- Shape: Rectangular house with lantern on roof

Light
- First lit: 1876
- Deactivated: 1939
- Focal height: 50 feet (15 m)
- Lens: sixth-order Fresnel lens
- Range: 7.5 nautical miles (14 km; 9 mi)
- Characteristic: fixed red

The Bullock's Point Light was a lighthouse in the Providence River. It was irreparably damaged by the hurricane of 1938 and was replaced the following year by an automated light on a steel tower.

== History ==
A large shoal extends out into the Providence River from Bullock's Point, and in 1860 the Lighthouse Board set a daymark at the southwest tip of the shoal. Complaints about the adequacy of this grew as shipping increased, and in 1872 built a small pier at the site and set a portable beacon on it, maintained by the keepers of the Sabin Point Light. This too was deemed inadequate, and starting in 1875 the pier was enlarged, and a unique frame house was perched upon it, with the lantern projecting from the center of the roof. Difficulties in construction due to bad weather delayed lighting of the new beacon until 1876. Over the years decking was added at the base of the house.

Although the Hurricane of 1938 did not utterly destroy the lighthouse, the damage was severe. One of the end walls was totally stove in, and the stairs to the second floor were destroyed. Nonetheless, the keeper, Andrew Zuius, was able to take refuge upstairs and even kept the light burning through the storm. He continued to tend the light into the following year, while living on shore; but in 1939 he was transferred to the Palmer Island Light and the house was demolished. A modern steel tower was placed on the remains of the pier, and it remains in operation to the present.

== Keepers ==
| Keeper | Years |
|---|---|
| Joseph Bowes | 1872-1875 |
| John J. Weeden | 1875-1877 |
| Stephen A. Hawkins | 1877-1885 |
| Charles Lough | 1885-1886 |
| Joseph B. Eddy | 1886-1892 |
| John J. Card | 1892-1901 |
| William T. Tengren | 1901-1909 |
| John F. Anderson | 1909-1910 |
| Arthur J. Baldwin | 1910-1914 |
| Willis Green | 1914-1915 |
| Charles C. Fletcher | 1915-1916 |
| Julius Johanson | 1916-1918 |
| Unknown | 1918-1927 |
| Andrew Zuius | 1927-1939 |

== Notes ==
- "Historic Light Station Information and Photography: Rhode Island". United States Coast Guard Historian's Office. Archived from the original on 2017-05-01.
- D'Entremont, Jeremy. "Bullock's Point Light: History". Archived from the original on October 13, 1999.
- Holmes, R. "Rhode Island Lighthouse History: Bullock Point Light".
