= Fort Hamilton Historic District =

Historic district in Rhode Island, United States

Coordinates: 41°29′46.91″N 71°20′28.1″W

- U.S. National Register of Historic Places
- U.S. Historic district
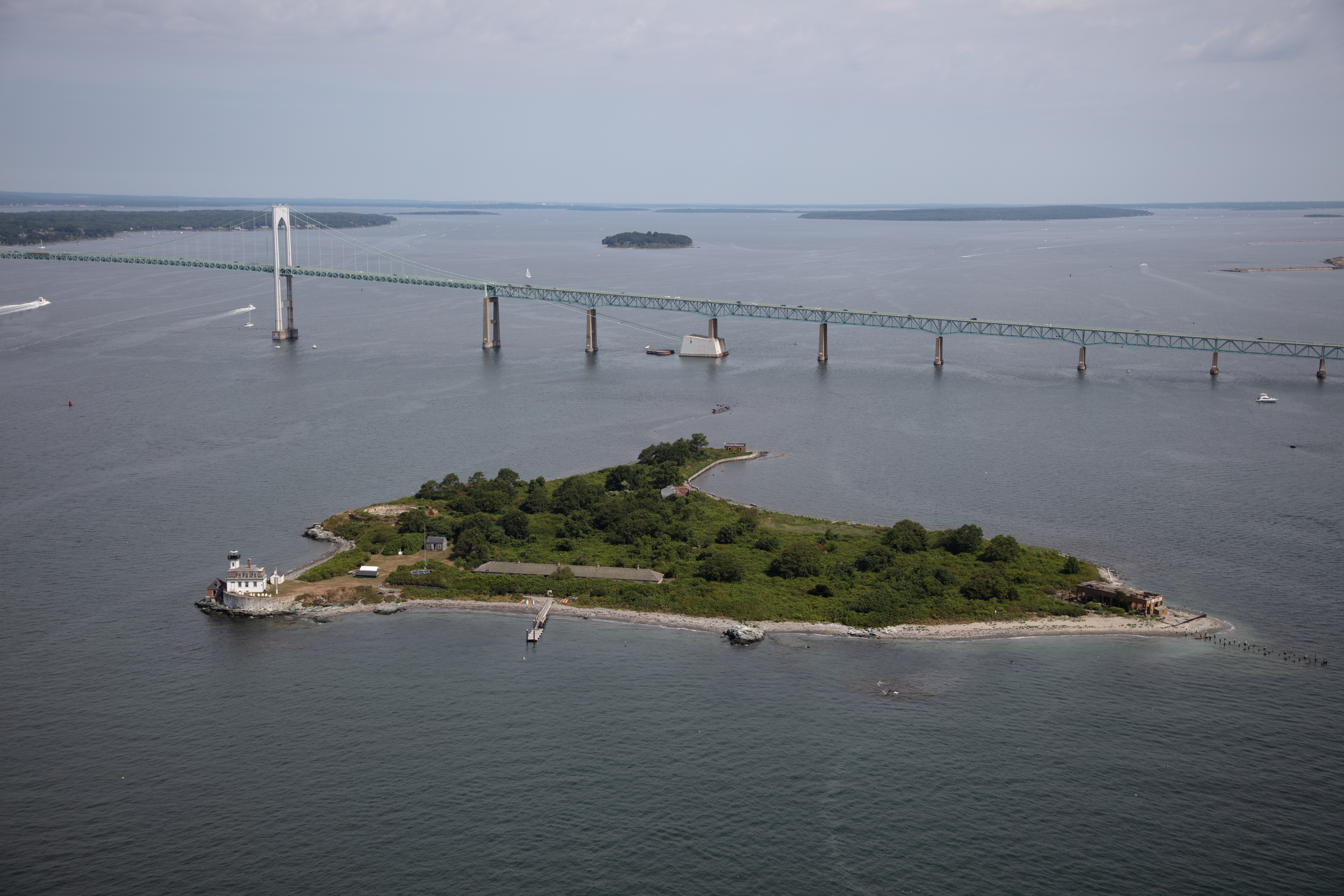

- Location within Rhode Island Location within the United States
- Location: Newport, Rhode Island
- Built: 1780
- Architect: Anne Louis de Tousard
- MPS: Lighthouses of Rhode Island TR
- NRHP reference No.: 01001158
- Added to NRHP: October 22, 2001

The Fort Hamilton Historic District is a historic district including all of Rose Island in Newport, Rhode Island. The district includes Rose Island Light and an early U.S. military fortification designed in part by Major Louis de Tousard. The fort was named after Alexander Hamilton, and was part of the first system of US fortifications.

== History ==
Main Article: Fort Hamilton

The earliest fortifications on Rose Island were built in 1780 during the American Revolutionary War around the time of the Battle of Rhode Island. Later construction took place from 1798 to 1801 but was left largely unfinished except for a long barracks building used by the U.S. Infantry. The Secretary of War's report on fortifications for December 1811 describes Fort Hamilton as "a regular unfinished work of masonry of four bastions, two of which are circular. (The fort can house) 300 men". In the 19th century Fort Hamilton was used as a quarantine station for the port of Newport, and the island served as a popular picnic destination. Starting in the late 19th century, the island became part of the U.S. Naval Torpedo Station, and during World War I and World War II the fort was used for munitions storage by the U.S. Navy as it conducted torpedo tests, also using facilities on nearby Goat Island and Gould Island. During World War II anti-aircraft guns were also added to the island, first Navy 5-inch guns and later Army 90 mm guns. The fort was added to the National Register of Historic Places in 2001.

== Images ==
Fort Hamilton, early plans from ca. 1800

Fort Hamilton barracks building

== See also ==
- National Register of Historic Places listings in Newport County, Rhode Island
