= Pomham Rocks Light =

Pomham Rocks Light Pomham Rocks Light
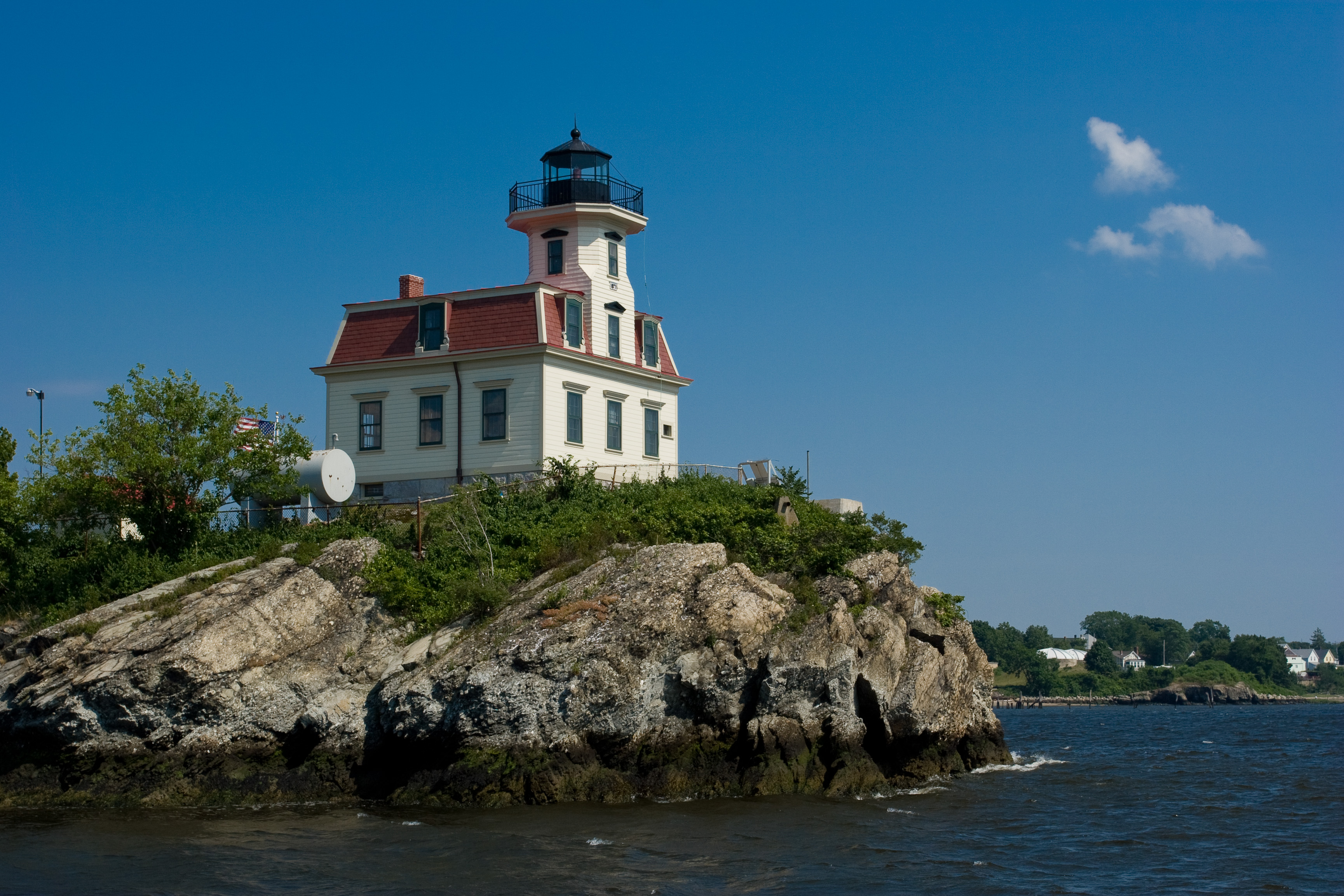
- Pomham Rocks Light in 2007, viewed from a boat.
- Location: Riverside Rd., East Providence, Rhode Island
- Coordinates: 41°46′39.062″N 71°22′10.394″W

Tower
- Constructed: 1871
- Foundation: Stone
- Construction: Wood
- Automated: 1974
- Height: 12 m (39 ft)
- Shape: Octagonal on square house
- Markings: White with black lantern and red roof on house
- Heritage: National Register of Historic Places listed place
- Fog signal: none

Light
- First lit: 1871
- Deactivated: 1974-2006
- Focal height: 67 feet (20 m)
- Lens: 6th order Fresnel lens (original), 9.8 inches (250 mm) (current)
- Range: 6 nautical miles (11 km; 6.9 mi)
- Characteristic: Fixed Red
- Pomham Rocks Light Station
- U.S. National Register of Historic Places
- Area: 0.5 acres (0.20 ha)
- Architect: Albert Dow
- MPS: Lighthouses of Rhode Island TR (AD)
- NRHP reference No.: 79000001
- Added to NRHP: July 09, 1979

Pomham Rocks Light (also known as "Pomham Lighthouse") is a historic lighthouse in the Providence River about 200 yards (180 m) off the shoreline of the Riverside neighborhood of the city of East Providence, Rhode Island. It is the northernmost lighthouse in Narragansett Bay.

== History ==
The light was established in 1871. The light was one of a group of New England lighthouses built to the same plan after an award-winning design by Vermont architect Albert Dow. Nearly identical lights were constructed at Sabin Point, Rose Island, Esopus Meadows Light and Colchester Reef.

The lighthouse was decommissioned in 1974, and its antique fourth-order fresnel lens donated to the Custom House Maritime Museum in Massachusetts. The lighthouse was sold to a private family in 1974. In 1980 it was acquired by ExxonMobil, which operates a fuel terminal nearby. In 2010, ExxonMobil donated the building and island to the American Lighthouse Foundation, the parent organization of the Friends of Pomham Rocks Lighthouse.

=== Friends of Pomham Rocks Lighthouse ===
The Friends of Pomham Rocks Lighthouse was formed in 2004. In 2006, the group restored the exterior and installed a new LED navigational light.

When the group acquired ownership of the lighthouse from ExxonMobil in 2010, the floor was completely rotted and the tower was leaning 7 degrees off center. The stairs were crooked, and the tower would sway in the wind. The Friends raised over $1.5 million to restore the building. The group installed a new floor, restored electricity to the island, and acquired a dedicated boat, among other repairs.

In 2021, the original 2.5-foot tall fourth-order Fresnel lens was restored and returned to the lighthouse, in time to mark the light's 150th anniversary. The lens is displayed inside the lighthouse building for visitors.

== List of keepers ==
1. C.H. Salisbury (1871 – 1893)
2. Mary A. Salisbury (1893)
3. Nathaniel Dodge (1893 – 1898)
4. Thomas S. Fishburne (1898 – 1908)
5. Adolf H. Aronson (1908 – 1937)
6. William James Howard (1937 – 1951)
7. Howard B. Beebe (1951 – 1956)
8. Unknown (1956–1971)
9. Dennis Tardiff (1971 – 1974)
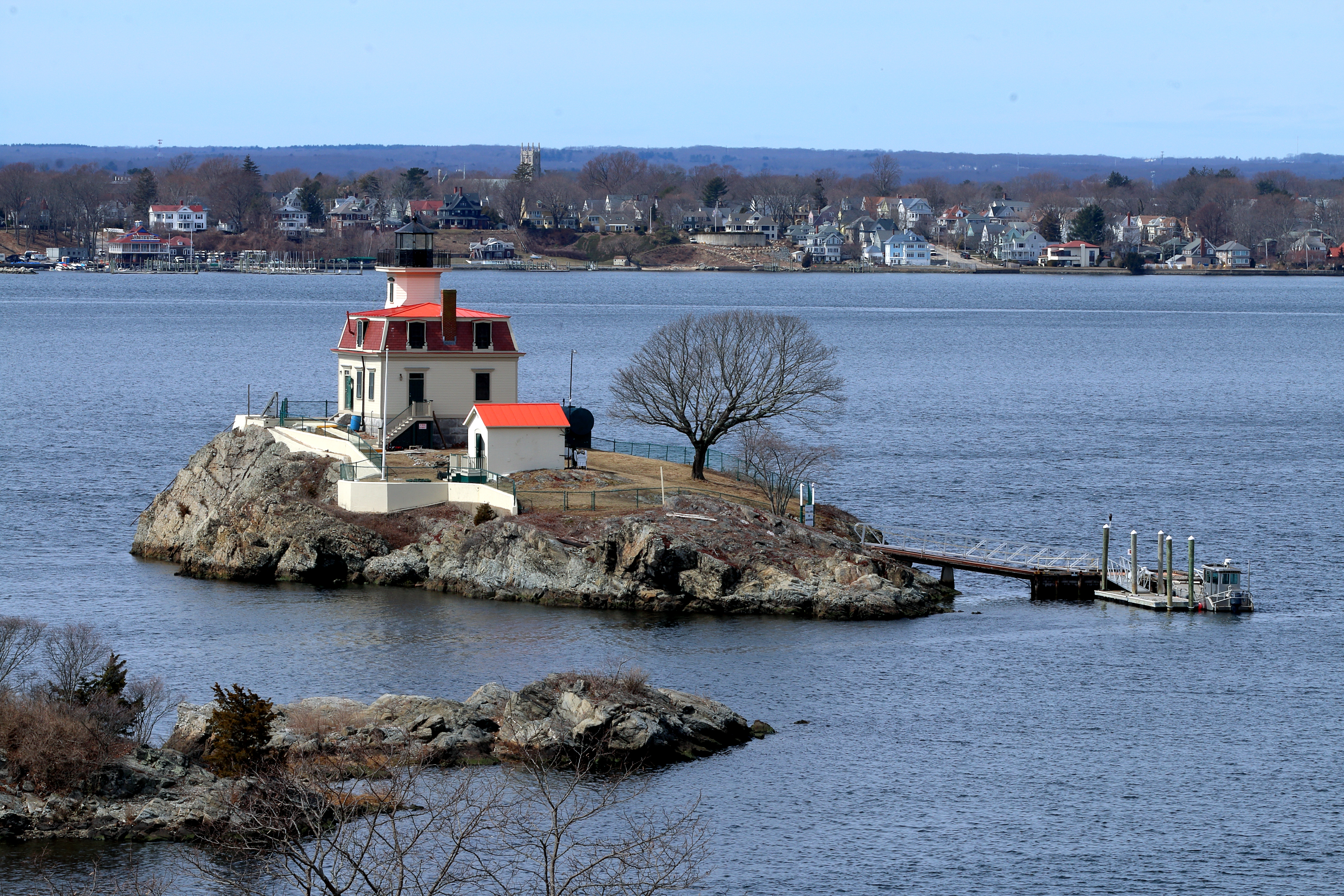
Image capture on March 23, 2018

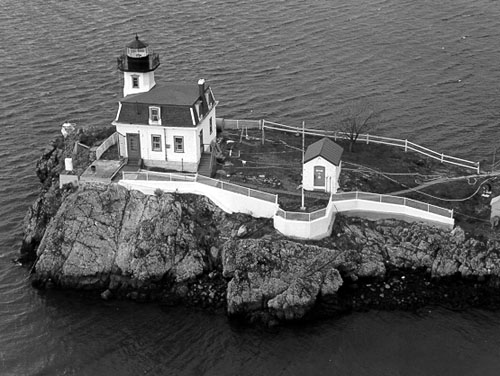
Viewed from the air

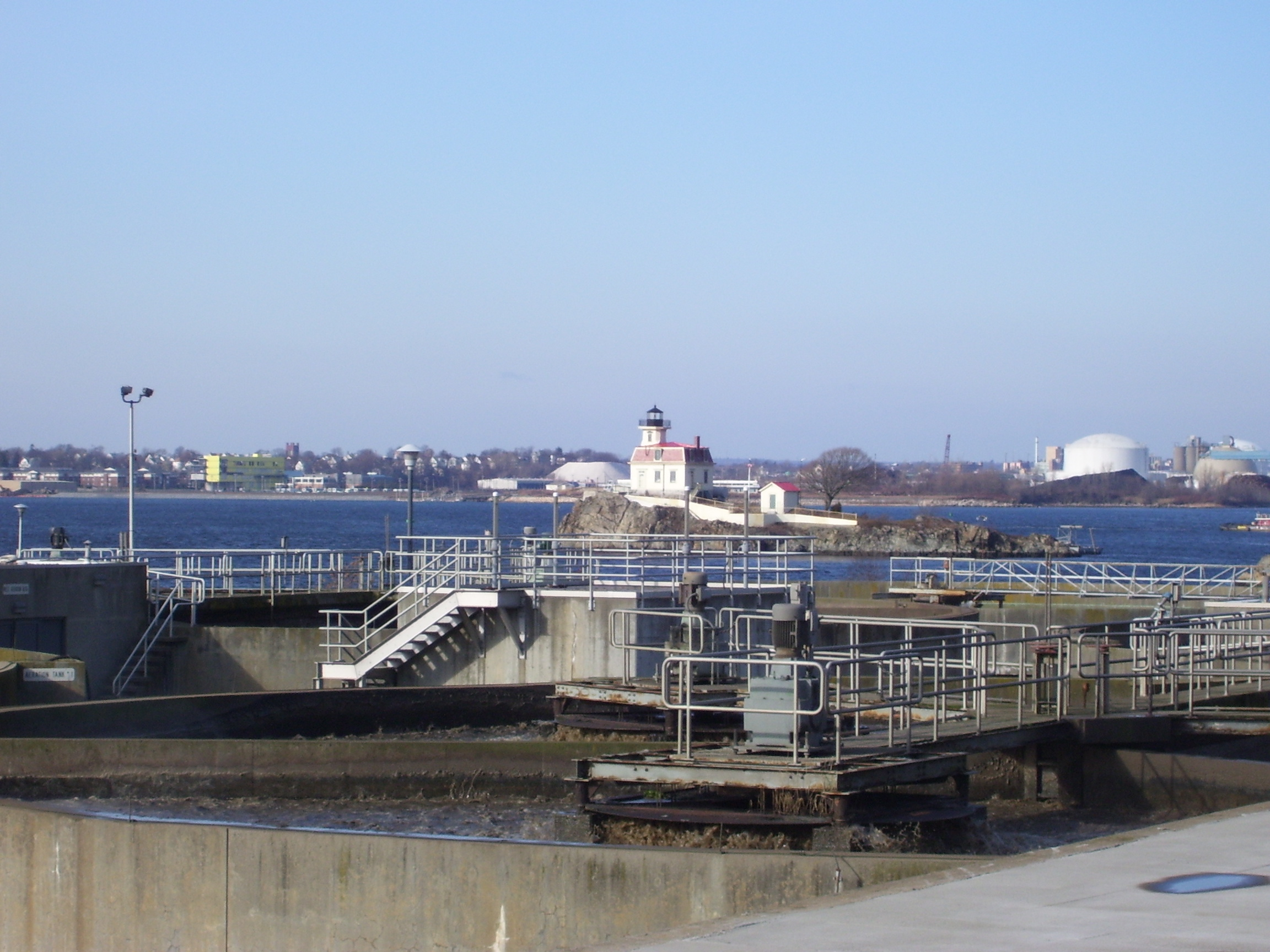
Pomham Rocks Light in 2008 with sewage treatment plant in foreground

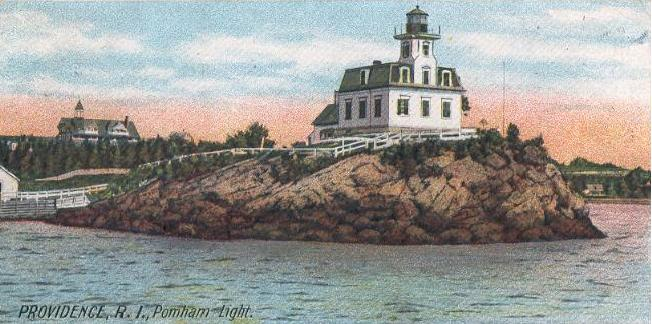
1905 postcard

== See also ==
- National Register of Historic Places listings in Providence County, Rhode Island
