= Rondout Light =

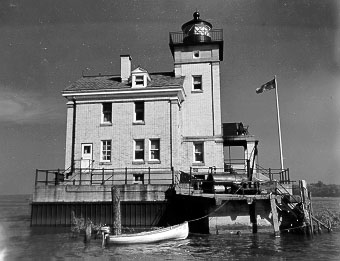
- Location: Hudson River at Rondout Creek, Kingston, New York
- Coordinates: 41°55′15″N 73°57′45″W

Tower
- Constructed: 1838
- Foundation: Concrete pier with wood piles
- Construction: Brick
- Automated: 1954
- Height: 48 feet (15 m)
- Shape: Square tower with attached house
- Markings: Yellow brick with black lantern
- Heritage: National Register of Historic Places listed place
- Fog signal: Horn (removed)

Light
- First lit: 1915 (current tower)
- Focal height: 54 feet (16 m)
- Lens: Sixth order Fresnel lens (original), 9.8 inches (250 mm) (current)
- Range: 9 nautical miles (17 km; 10 mi)
- Characteristic: Flashing White, 6 secs
- Kingston/Rondout 2 Lighthouse
- U.S. National Register of Historic Places
- Area: less than one acre
- Built: 1915
- MPS: Hudson River Lighthouses TR
- NRHP reference No.: 79001640
- Added to NRHP: May 29, 1979

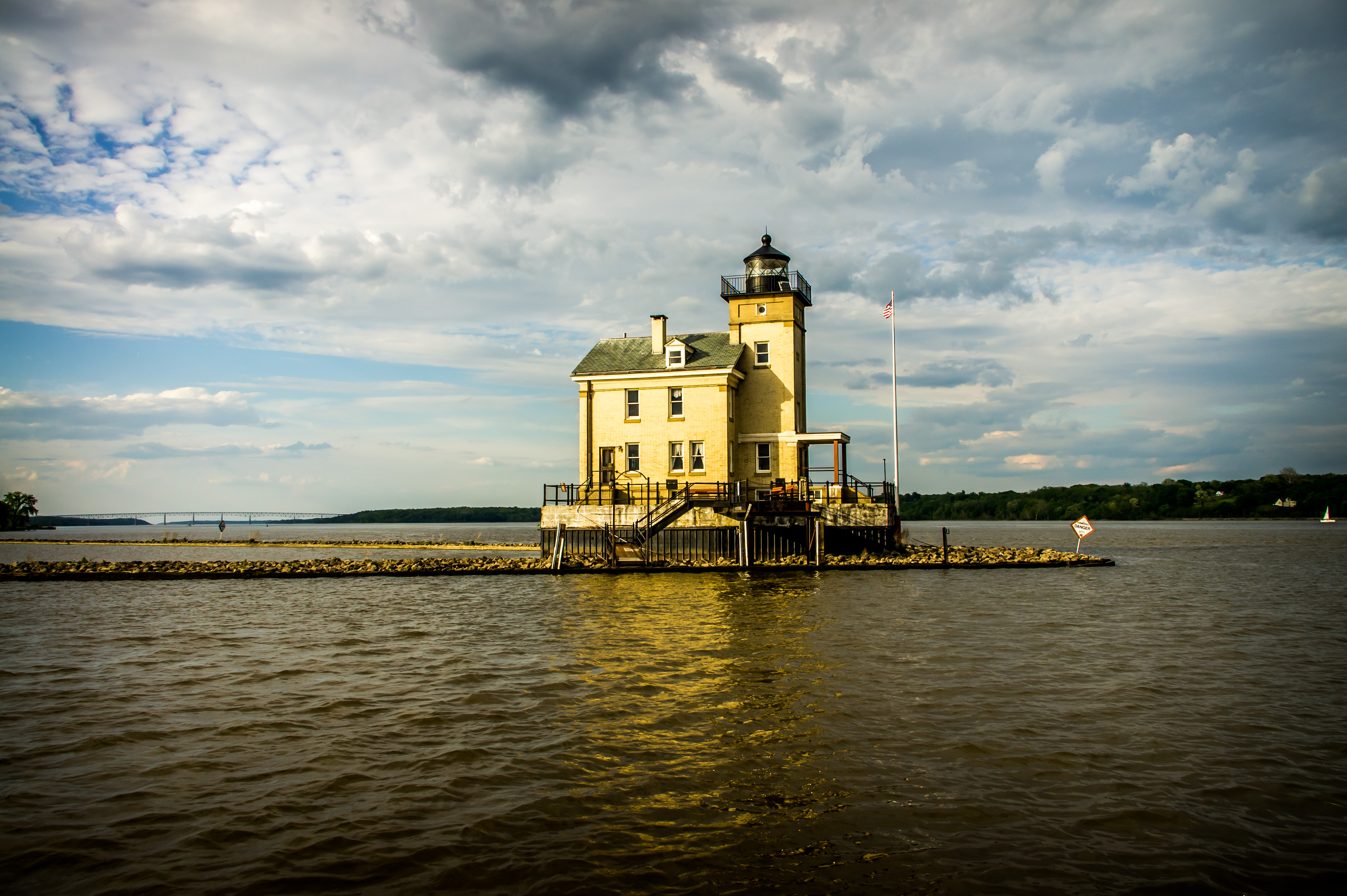
Rondout light

Rondout Light is a lighthouse on the west side of the Hudson River at Kingston, New York.

== Nomenclature ==
- The official name in the Coast Guard Light List is Rondout Creek Leading Light.
- The National Register name, Kingston/Rondout 2 Lighthouse comes from its location in a series of day beacons and lights in Rondout Creek. Number 2 is the first on the right hand side.
- The USCG history site calls it Rondout Creek (Kingston) Light.

== History ==
The first lighthouse at the entrance to the Rondout Creek was a wooden one built in 1837. It was replaced by a second lighthouse, made of sturdier bluestone, in 1867. The bluestone lighthouse was abandoned after 1915 and torn down in the 1950s. Only its circular stone foundation remains today.

The current lighthouse was built in 1915, replacing the earlier 1867 lighthouse. In 1954 the light was automated and the building closed. The National Historic Lighthouse Preservation Act provides for the Coast Guard to declare some lighthouses surplus, and for their ownership to be transferred to historical, non-profit or local government entities following an application process and review. Nine lighthouses were identified in the fall of 2001 as part of a pilot program to transfer such lighthouses. Rondout Light was one of those nine. Rondout Light was transferred from the Coast Guard to the City of Kingston in 2002. It is currently managed by the non-profit Hudson River Maritime Museum.

It was listed on the National Register of Historic Places in 1979.
