= Grand Haven Light =

Grand Haven Light can refer to one of three lighthouses in Grand Haven, Michigan.

- Grand Haven North Pierhead Light
- Grand Haven South Pierhead Entrance Light
- Grand Haven South Pierhead Inner Light
