= Louis de Tousard =

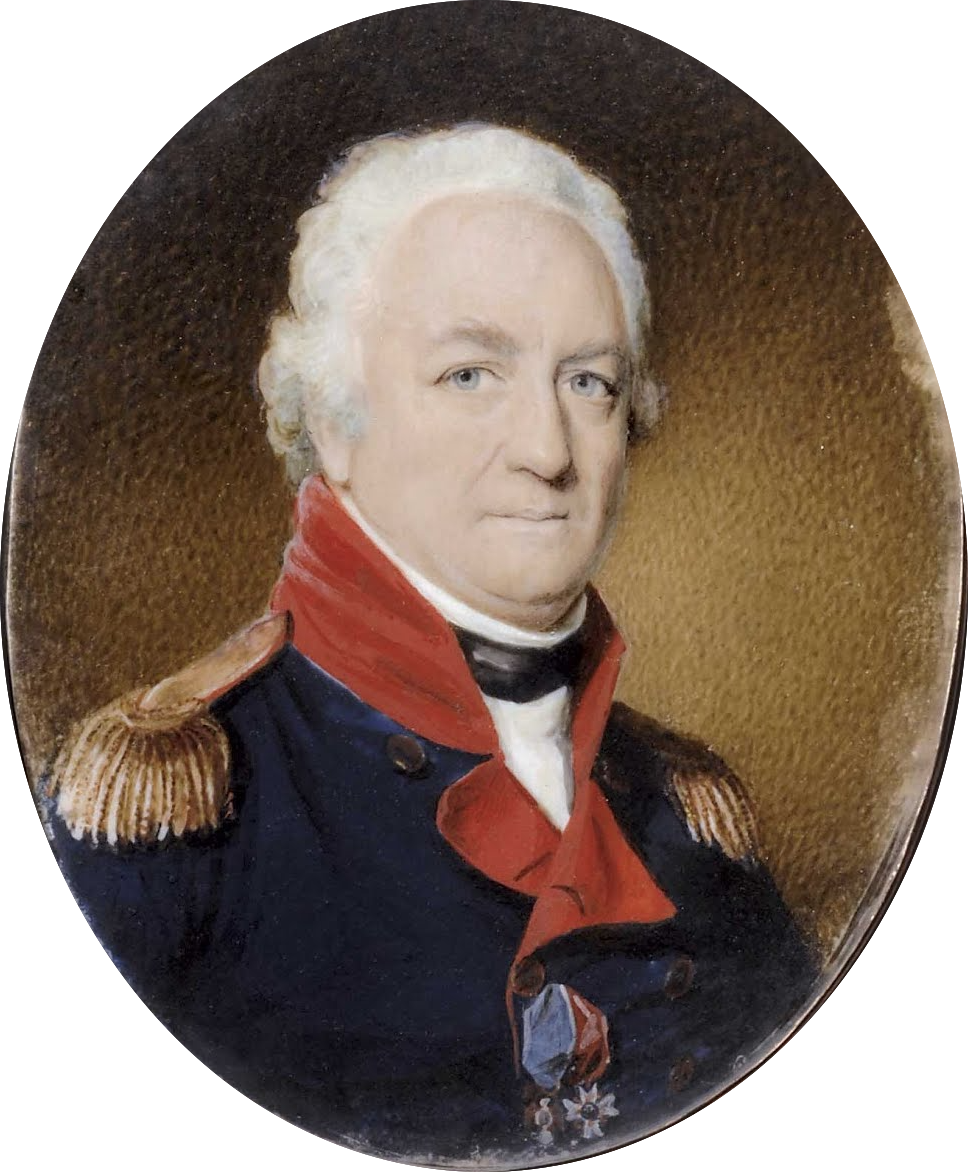
- portrait by Edward Greene Malbone
- Born: 12 March 1749; Paris
- Died: 10 April 1817 (aged 68); Paris
- Occupation: Military personnel, diplomat, engineer
- Awards: Order of Saint Louis
- Position held: Consul General of France in New Orleans

Louis de Tousard (1749–1817) was a French artillerist who served in the American Continental Army under La Fayette, and later was given a US commission. Tousard wrote two very influential books: one was a proposal for a school for officers that became the blueprint for West Point, and the other was a manual for artillery officers that became standard in the young army.

== Biography ==
He is the brother of Antoine Étienne de Tousard.

Educated at the Strasbourg school of artillery, Tousard served with the Continental Army between 1777–1778 and lost an arm due to wound received in the Battle of Rhode Island. He was decorated with the Order of Saint Louis on his return to France.

After being briefly imprisoned during the French Revolution in 1793 at Prison de l'Abbaye, he returned to the US in 1795 where he received a commission as a major in the 2nd U.S. Artillery Regiment in the Corps of Artillerists and Engineers. By 1800 he was a lieutenant colonel and Inspector of Artillery. As the Inspector, he supervised the construction of several forts in Eastern seaboard of the US, and the construction and testing of cannons.

His influence with George Washington was instrumental in the establishment of the U.S. Military Academy at West Point in 1802, initially to train engineers and artillerists, with a curriculum modeled after that of the École Polytechnique. After retiring from US service he served France in military and diplomatic capacities. In 1809 he published The American Arillerist's Companion, or Elements of Artillery, a book that became the basic manual for US artillerymen.

== Influence on armory and manufacturing ==
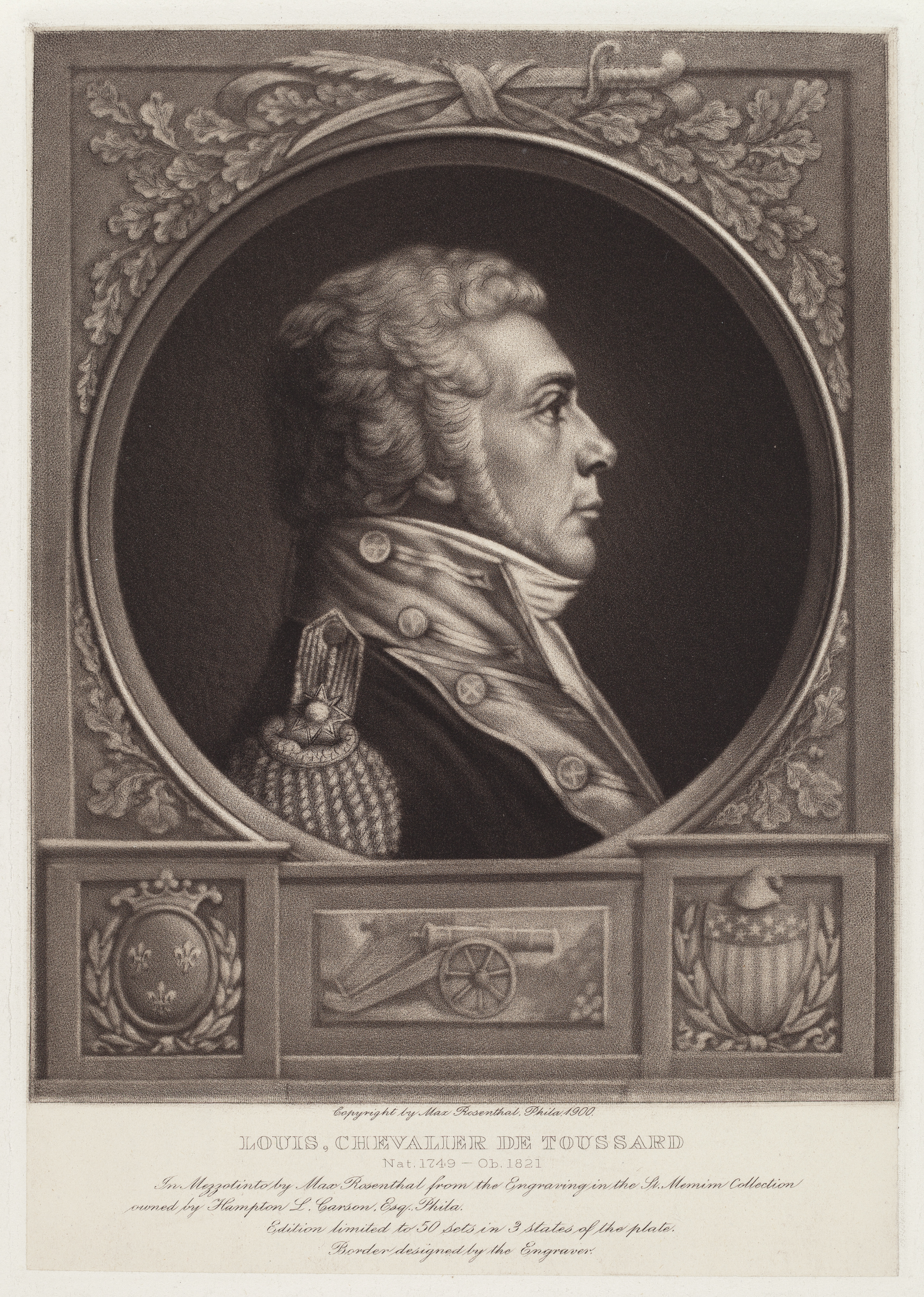
Louis, chevalier de Tousard

His greatest influence was that he promoted Jean Baptiste Vaquette de Gribeauval's idea of interchangeable parts for guns. The War Department then set up the armories at Springfield and Harpers Ferry, which set out to perfect the idea. Despite the claims of Eli Whitney, who failed to deliver on his original 1798 contract until 1809 and who never achieved interchangeability, the American system of manufacturing was not perfected until inside contractor Captain John H. Hall realized it with the M1819 Hall rifle.

Historian David A. Hounshell said,

The importance of Tousard's book [on artillery], as well as his informal teaching of officers in the Corps of Artillerists and Engineers, cannot be overemphasized. […] Thomas Jefferson's enthusiasm for Honoré Blanc's experiments with the manufacture of interchangeable musket parts and the influence on the American military of the rationalism of General Gribeauval and his followers firmly established the intellectual and institutional basis for the rise of the American system of arms production. The pure rationalism of 'system and uniformity' provided an adequate incentive for the pursuit of this goal. The United States War Department soon found the idea of interchangeability irresistible, and through its own armories and through private arms contracts it encouraged and supported attempts to achieve this end. Eventually the War Department demanded interchangeability. Ordnance officers elevated the idea of interchangeability to an ideal and helped to transform it into a reality.

== Other military contributions ==
Major de Tousard also designed Fort Adams and Fort Hamilton in Newport, Rhode Island.

== Bibliography ==
- Hounshell, David A. (1984), From the American System to Mass Production, 1800–1932: The Development of Manufacturing Technology in the United States, Baltimore, Maryland: Johns Hopkins University Press, ISBN 978-0-8018-2975-8, LCCN 83016269, OCLC 1104810110
- Kinard, Jeff (2007), Artillery: an illustrated history of its impact, ABC-CLIO, ISBN 978-1-85109-556-8.
- Smith, Merritt Roe (1985), Military enterprise and technological change: perspectives on the American experience, MIT Press, ISBN 978-0-262-19239-2.
- de Tousard, Louis (1809), The American Arillerist's Companion, or Elements of Artillery, Philadelphia, Pennsylvania, USA: C. and A. Conrad and Co., LCCN 19017252. [Title page description] "Treating of all kinds of firearms in detail, and of the formation, object and service of the flying or horse artillery, preceded by an introductory dissertation on cannon. In two volumes. Accompanied with a volume containing sixty-seven plates carefully engraved. By Louis de Tousard, Member of the Society of the Cincinnati; late Lieutenant Colonel adjoint to the General Staff in the armies of H. I. and R. M.; late Lieut. Colonel Commandant of the Second Regiment and Inspector of Artillery of the United States."
- Sim Gérald, Louis Tousard (1749-1817). Un artilleur entre deux mondes, Paris, L'Harmattan, 2021. ISBN 978-2-343-22195-3
