= Warwick Light =

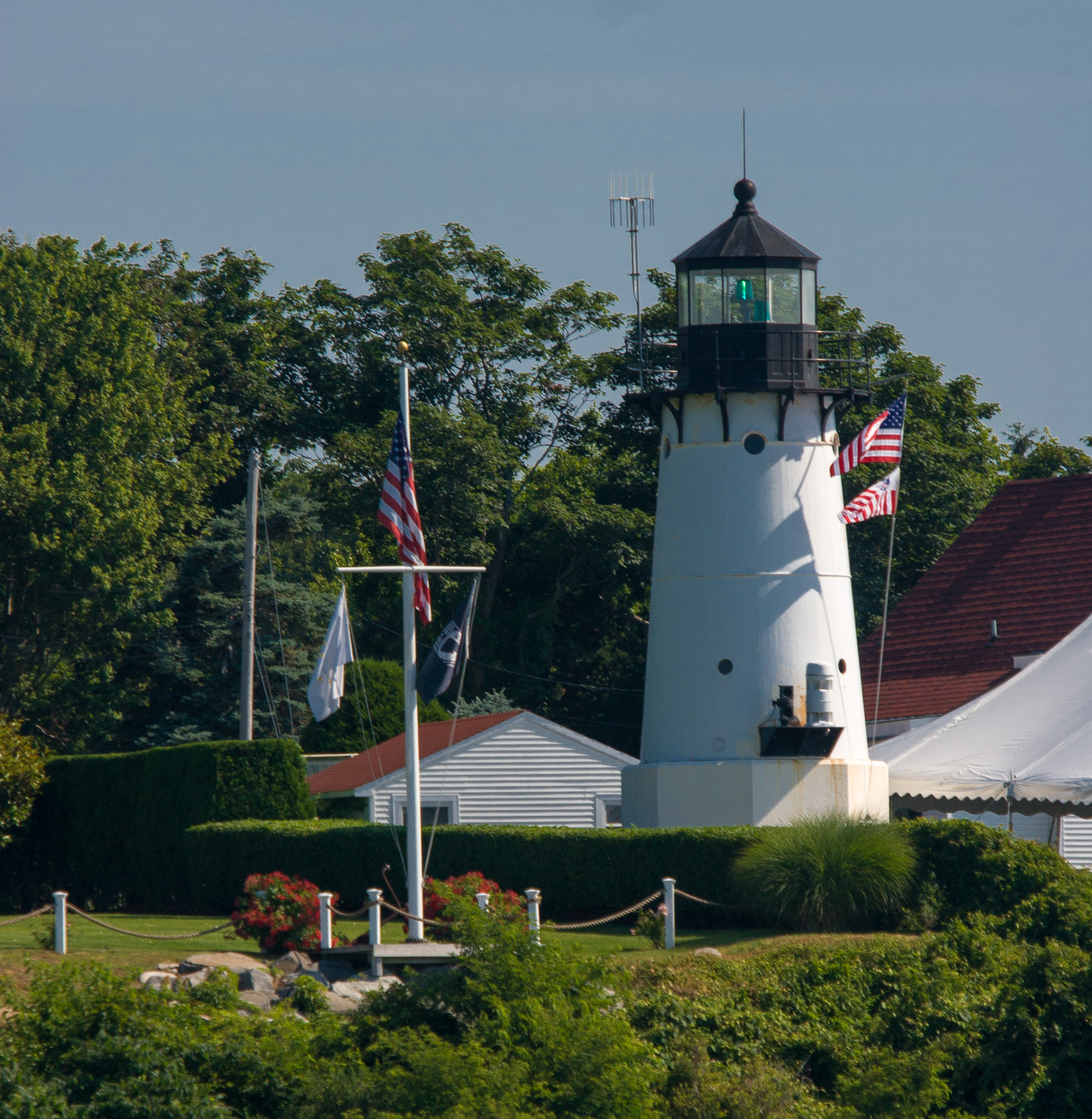
- Location: Warwick, Rhode Island
- Coordinates: 41°40′1.8″N 71°22′41.9″W

Tower
- Constructed: 1827
- Foundation: Reinforced concrete
- Construction: Cast Iron
- Automated: 1985
- Height: 15.5 m (51 ft)
- Shape: Cylindrical with octagonal lantern and base
- Markings: White with black lantern
- Heritage: National Register of Historic Places listed place
- Fog signal: Horn, 1 every 15 sec

Light
- First lit: 1932
- Focal height: 66 feet (20 m)
- Lens: Fourth order Fresnel lens (original), 9.8 inches (250 mm) (1985)
- Range: 12 nautical miles (22 km; 14 mi)
- Characteristic: Occulting Green 4 seconds Operates 24 hours
- Warwick Lighthouse
- U.S. National Register of Historic Places
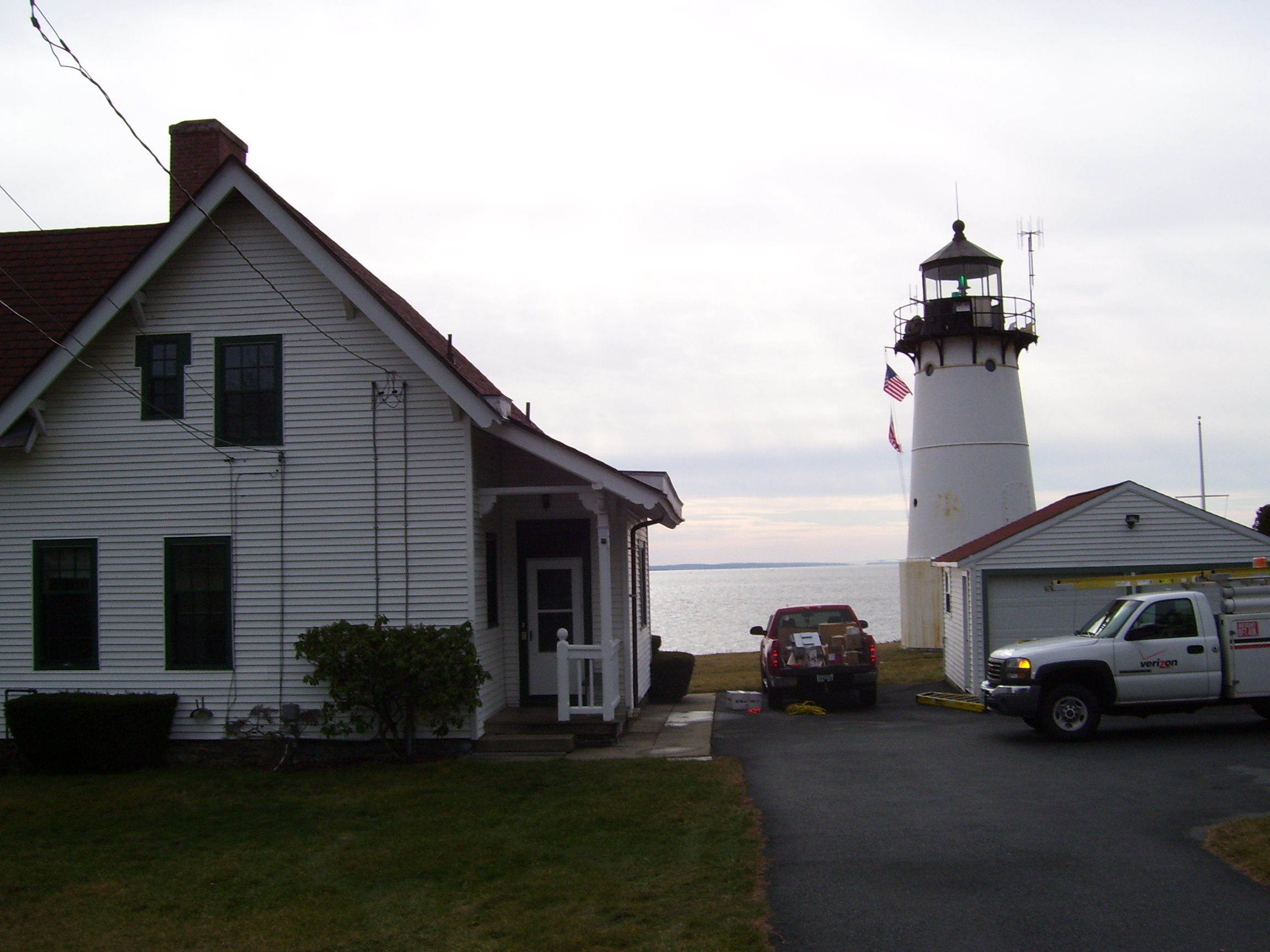
- 2008
- Built: 1899 (keeper's quarters)
- Architectural style: Stick/Eastlake (keeper's quarters)
- MPS: Lighthouses of Rhode Island TR
- NRHP reference No.: 88000268
- Added to NRHP: March 30, 1988

Warwick Light, also known as Warwick Lighthouse, is an historic lighthouse in Warwick, Rhode Island, United States.

== History ==
The first light on the site was built in 1827. The original keeper's residence was replaced in 1899. The current structure at Warwick Neck was built on the site in 1932. In 1985, the light was the last Rhode Island lighthouse automated. The light was listed on the National Register of Historic Places in 1988 as Warwick Lighthouse.

== See also ==
- National Register of Historic Places listings in Kent County, Rhode Island
