= Rose Island (Rhode Island) =

Island in Narragansett Bay, Rhode Island, USA

Coordinates: 41°29′46.91″N 71°20′28.1″W

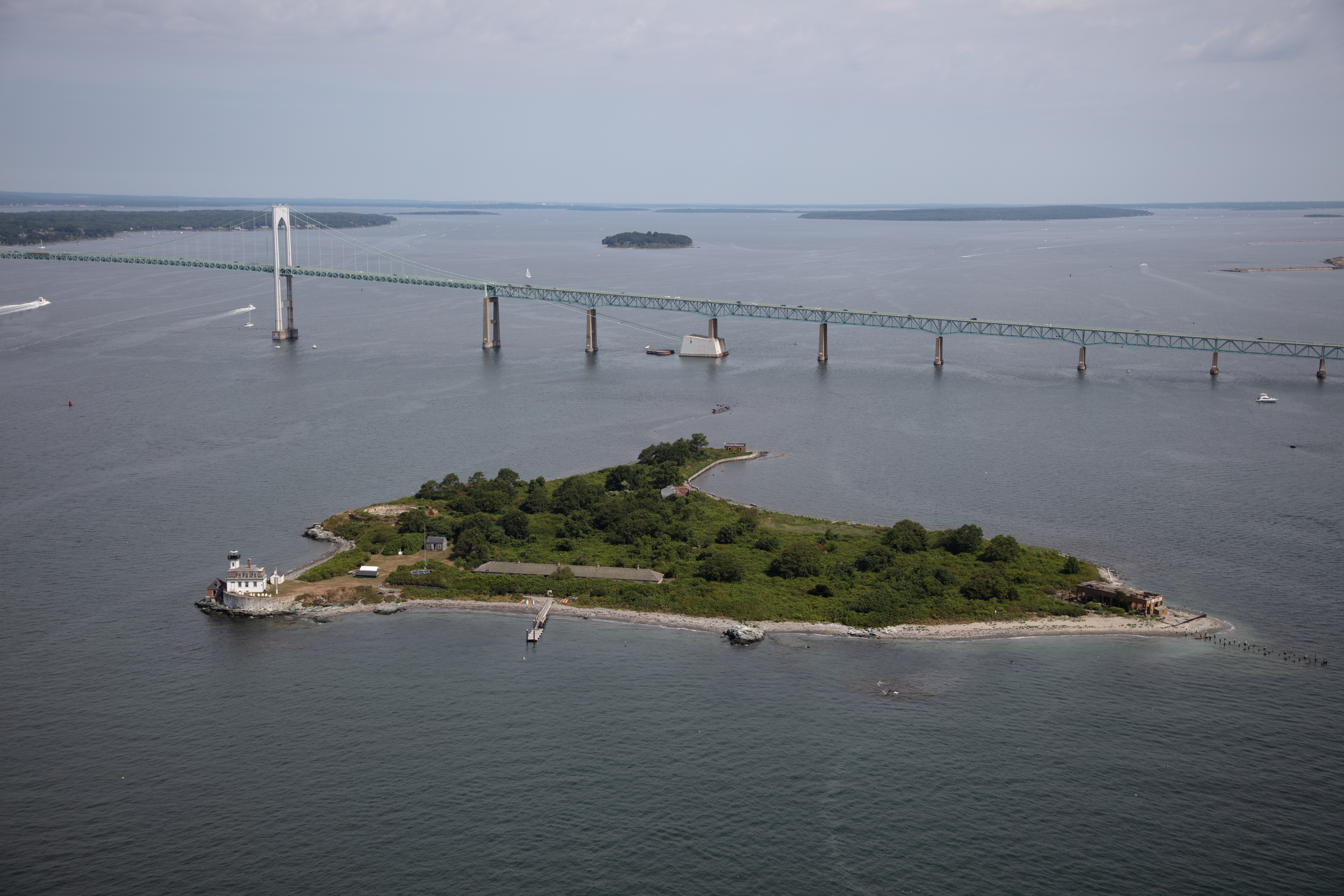
Rose Island with the Claiborne Pell Newport Bridge visible in the background

Rose Island is an 18.5-acre (7.5 ha) island in Narragansett Bay off Newport, Rhode Island, United States. It is allegedly named "Rose Island" because at low tide the island appears to be shaped like a rose. The island is only accessible by boat. The island and its lighthouse are run by the private, non-profit Rose Island Lighthouse Foundation.

== History ==
The Native American name for Rose Island was "Conockonoquit". Fortifications were constructed during the American Revolution on the island. In 1798, the U.S. government began constructing Fort Hamilton on Rose Island, but never completed the fort. Units of the U.S. Infantry were stationed there. The stone barracks from the fort still remain. The U.S. Navy used Rose Island to store explosives during both World Wars as part of the Naval Torpedo Station. The government stopped using the island after World War II (except for the lighthouse) and declared it government surplus. The abandoned fort was added to the National Register of Historic Places in 2001 as Fort Hamilton Historic District.

== Lighthouse ==
Built in 1870, the Rose Island Light served as an aid to navigation for a century, and was deactivated in 1970 after the Claiborne Pell Newport Bridge was built. In 1984, a group of citizens started the Newport Lighthouse Foundation to preserve the light. As of 2008, it has been restored to its Victorian appearance.

Visitors may pay to stay at the lighthouse for a night or one week as keepers.

Operations on the island are overseen by a seasonal staff and a board of directors. Notably, the current Vice President of the board is Dr. Jen Thum, who is best known as the Associate Director of Academic Engagement & Campus Partnerships and Research Curator at the Harvard Art Museums.
