= Wilcox-Cutts House =

Historic house in Vermont, United States

- U.S. National Register of Historic Places
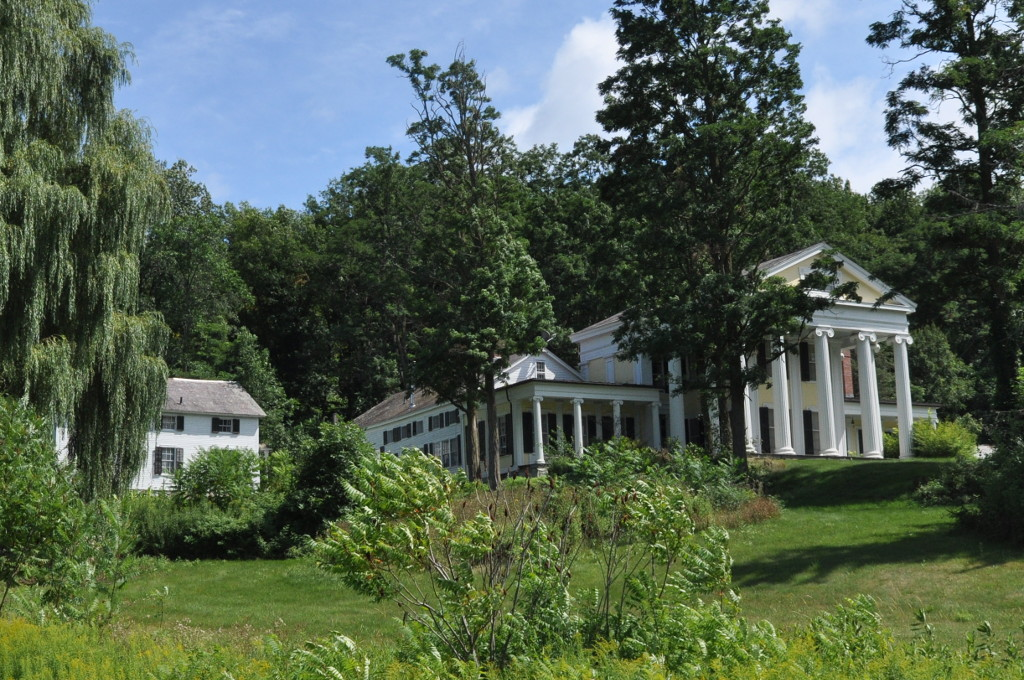

- Location within Vermont Location within the United States
- Location: VT 22A, Orwell, Vermont
- Coordinates: 43°47′5″N 73°18′29″W
- Area: 267 acres (108 ha)
- Built: 1789
- Built by: Lamb, James
- Architectural style: Greek Revival
- NRHP reference No.: 74000202
- Added to NRHP: December 2, 1974

The Wilcox-Cutts House is a historic house on Vermont Route 22A in Orwell, Vermont, USA. Its oldest portions date to 1789, but it is regarded as one of Vermont's finest examples of late Greek Revival architecture, the result of a major transformation in 1843. The house and accompanying farmland, also significant in the development of Morgan horse breeding in the state, was listed on the National Register of Historic Places in 1974.

== Description and history ==
The Wilcox-Cutts House stands in a rural area of central-southern Orwell, on the east side of Vermont Route 22A just south of Sanford Brook. The house is set on a farm property in excess of 250 acres (100 ha) which the road roughly bisects. The house is set back about 200 feet (61 m) from the road on a terraced rise with woods behind. It is an L-shaped 2 1/2-story wood-frame structure, with a gabled roof and clapboarded exterior. The main portion of the house has a Greek temple front, with five Ionic columns supporting a pedimented gable. Greek Revival detailing extends to single-story flanking wings, with the northern one acting as a connector to the rear ell, which is the original 18th-century farmhouse. The interior of the main block has high quality Greek Revival woodwork and plaster detailing.

The house now forming the rear of the house was built in 1789 by William Holenbeck, one of Orwell's first permanent settlers. The house was purchased in 1800 by Ebenezer Wilcox, who enlarged it slightly (with an ell to the east) in 1819. Wilcox's son Linus had the large Greek Revival front section added in 1843, retaining the services of the James Lamb, a regionally known master builder from Shoreham. The building is a remarkably sophisticated and high-style example of the Greek Revival for a rural setting, and has been twice copied: once for a house in Castleton, and again for a reduced-scale replica at the Shelburne Museum. Linus Wilcox was one of the first breeders of merino sheep in the state. In 1872, the property was acquired by Henry Cutts, who was one of the nation's leading breeders of the Morgan horse.

== See also ==
- National Register of Historic Places listings in Addison County, Vermont
