= Rose Island Light =

Lighthouse on Rose Island, Narragansett Bay, Rhode Island

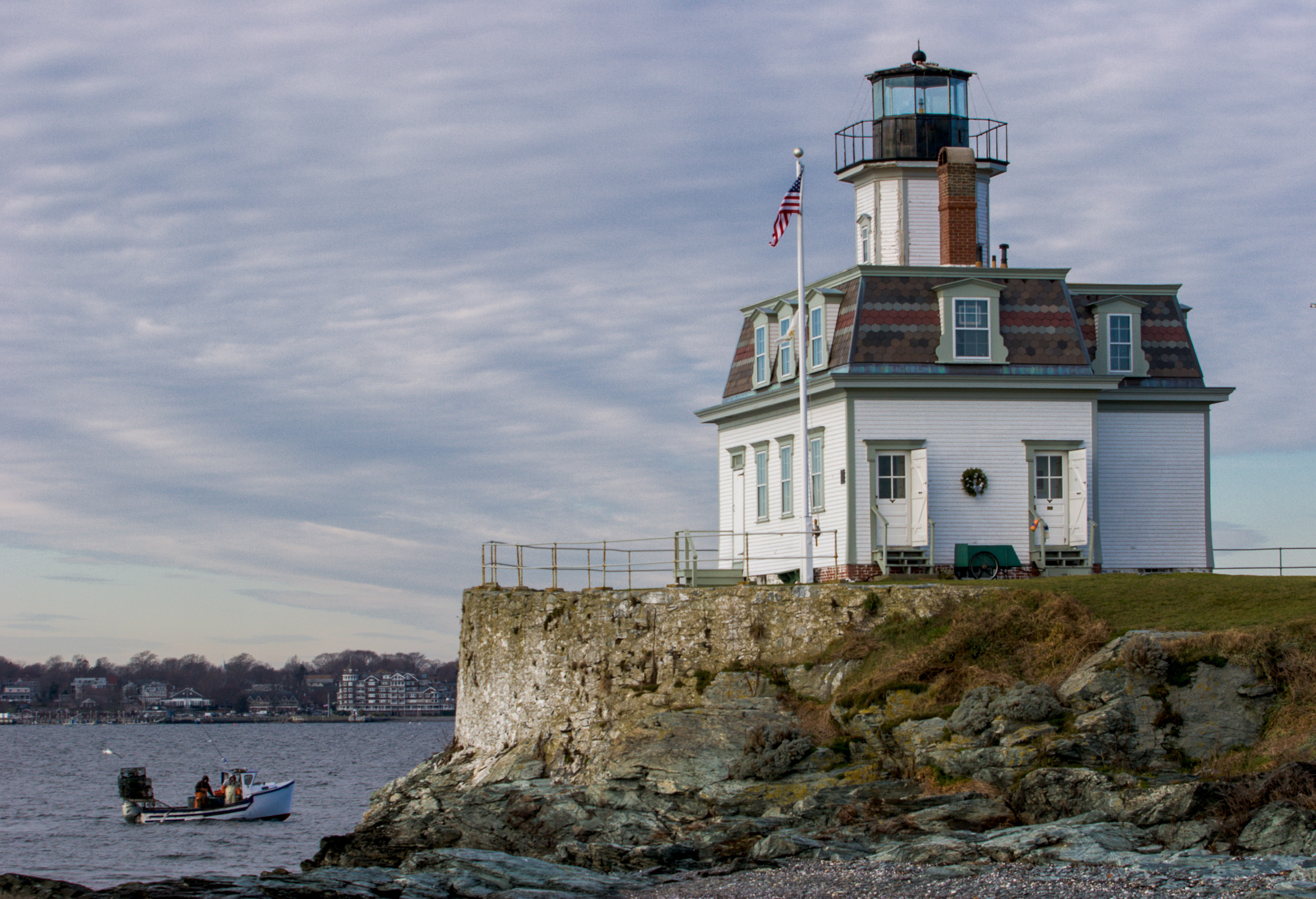
- Location: Newport, Rhode Island
- Coordinates: 41°29′43.68″N 71°20′33.78″W

Tower
- Constructed: 1870
- Foundation: Masonry
- Construction: Wood
- Height: 35 feet (11 m)
- Shape: Octagonal
- Markings: White tower on dwelling
- Heritage: National Register of Historic Places listed place
- Fog signal: none

Light
- First lit: 1993
- Deactivated: 1971-1992
- Focal height: 48 feet (15 m)
- Lens: 6th order Fresnel lens, 1870
- Characteristic: Flashing white, 6 seconds
- Rose Island Lighthouse
- U.S. National Register of Historic Places
- U.S. Historic district – Contributing property
- 1905 postcard
- Part of: Fort Hamilton Historic District (ID01001158)
- MPS: Lighthouses of Rhode Island TR
- NRHP reference No.: 87000033

Significant dates
- Added to NRHP: April 10, 1987
- Designated CP: October 22, 2001

The Rose Island Light, built in 1870, is on Rose Island in Narragansett Bay in Newport, Rhode Island in the United States. It is preserved, maintained and operated by The Rose Island Lighthouse Foundation.

One of a group of New England lighthouses built to an award-winning design by Vermont architect Albert Dow, Rose Island Light has sisters at Sabin Point, Pomham Rocks, Esopus Meadows Light and Colchester Reef. The lighthouse stands atop a bastion of Fort Hamilton, which was built in 1798-1800.

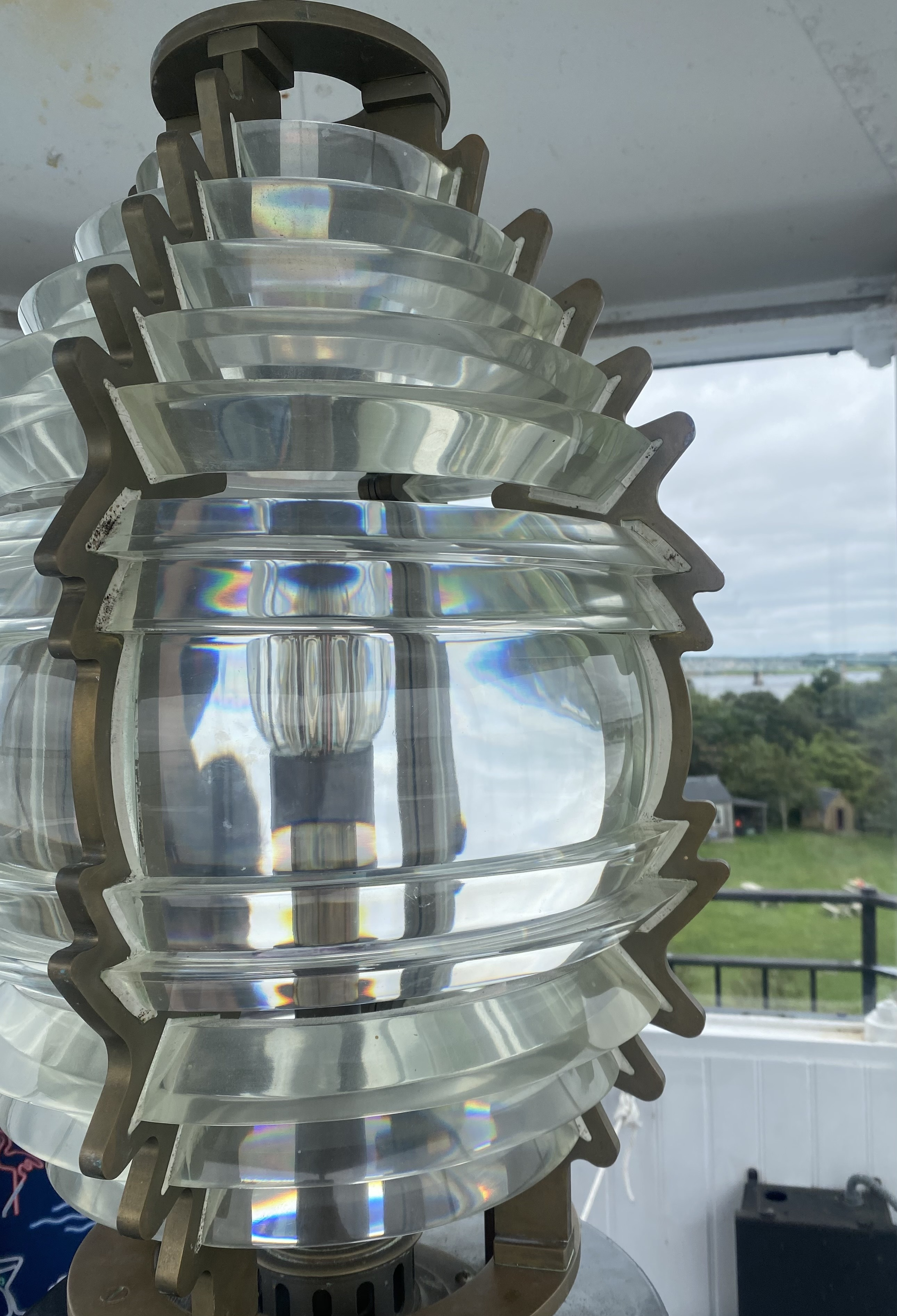
Detail of the Rose Island Light Fresnel lens.

The building was abandoned as a functioning lighthouse in 1970, when the Newport Bridge was constructed nearby. In 1984, the Rose Island Lighthouse Foundation was founded to restore the dilapidated light on behalf of the City of Newport, which had received it for free from the United States government. In 1987, the federal government listed the lighthouse on the National Register of Historic Places. In 1992 it was relit as a private aid to navigation.

The lighthouse is today a travel destination, reached only by boat. For a fee to the Foundation, visitors can spend a night as a guest or a week as the "lighthouse keeper," completing many of the chores required to keep the lighthouse in good condition.

== See also ==
- National Register of Historic Places listings in Newport County, Rhode Island
