= National Register of Historic Places listings in Jamestown, Rhode Island =

This is a list of Registered Historic Places in Jamestown, Rhode Island, which has been transferred from and is an integral part of National Register of Historic Places listings in Newport County, Rhode Island.

Contents: Counties in Rhode Island

Bristol | Kent | Newport | Providence | Washington

This National Park Service list is complete through NPS recent listings posted April 3, 2026.

	Name on the Register	Image	Date listed	Location	City or town	Description
1	Artillery Park	Artillery Park	March 7, 1973 (#73000054)	North Rd. and Narragansett Ave. 41°29′47″N 71°22′29″W	Jamestown	
2	Beavertail Light	Beavertail Light	December 12, 1977 (#77000024)	Beavertail Rd. 41°26′58″N 71°23′59″W	Jamestown	Continuously operating gateway to Narragansett Bay since 1749; part of the Lighthouses of Rhode Island Thematic Resource (TR)
3	Thomas Carr Farmstead Site (Keeler Site RI-707)		November 1, 1984 (#84000356)	Address Restricted	Jamestown	
4	Conanicut Battery		July 2, 1973 (#73000055)	West of Beaver Tail Rd. 41°28′49″N 71°23′38″W	Jamestown	
5	Conanicut Island Lighthouse	Conanicut Island Lighthouse	February 25, 1988 (#87001698)	64 N. Bay View Ave. 41°34′24″N 71°22′21″W	Jamestown	part of the Lighthouses of Rhode Island TR
6	Dutch Island Lighthouse	Dutch Island Lighthouse	February 25, 1988 (#87001701)	Southern end of Dutch Island; 41°29′44″N 71°24′16″W	Jamestown	part of the Lighthouses of Rhode Island TR
7	Fort Dumpling Site	Fort Dumpling Site	March 16, 1972 (#72000021)	Fort Wetherill; 41°28′38″N 71°21′28″W	Jamestown	Fort Wetherill was built on the site of Fort Dumpling.
8	Friends Meetinghouse	Friends Meetinghouse	March 7, 1973 (#73000276)	North Rd. and Weeden Lane; 41°30′52″N 71°22′31″W	Jamestown	
9	Hazard Farmstead (Joyner Site RI-706)		November 1, 1984 (#84000365)	Address Restricted	Jamestown	
10	Horsehead-Marbella	Horsehead-Marbella	June 16, 1999 (#99000675)	240 Highland Dr. 41°28′34″N 71°22′32″W	Jamestown	
11	Jamestown Archeological District		December 10, 1989 (#83004869)	Address Restricted	Jamestown	
12	Jamestown Windmill	Jamestown Windmill	March 14, 1973 (#73000057)	North Rd., north of Weeden Lane; 41°30′59″N 71°22′28″W	Jamestown	
13	Old Friends Archeological Site		November 7, 1995 (#95001269)	Address Restricted	Jamestown	
14	Shoreby Hill Historic District	Shoreby Hill Historic District	September 15, 2011 (#11000674)	Roughly bounded by Whittier Rd., Prudence Ln., Emerson Rd., Conanicus Ave., Knowles Ct., Coronado St. & Longfellow Rd. 41°29′57″N 71°22′08″W	Jamestown	
15	Windmill Hill Historic District	Windmill Hill Historic District	October 2, 1978 (#78000067)	Eldred Ave. and N. Main Rd. 41°31′04″N 71°22′44″W	Jamestown	

== See also ==
- National Register of Historic Places listings in Newport County, Rhode Island
- List of National Historic Landmarks in Rhode Island
