= Shoreby Hill Historic District =

Historic district in Rhode Island, United States

- U.S. National Register of Historic Places
- U.S. Historic district
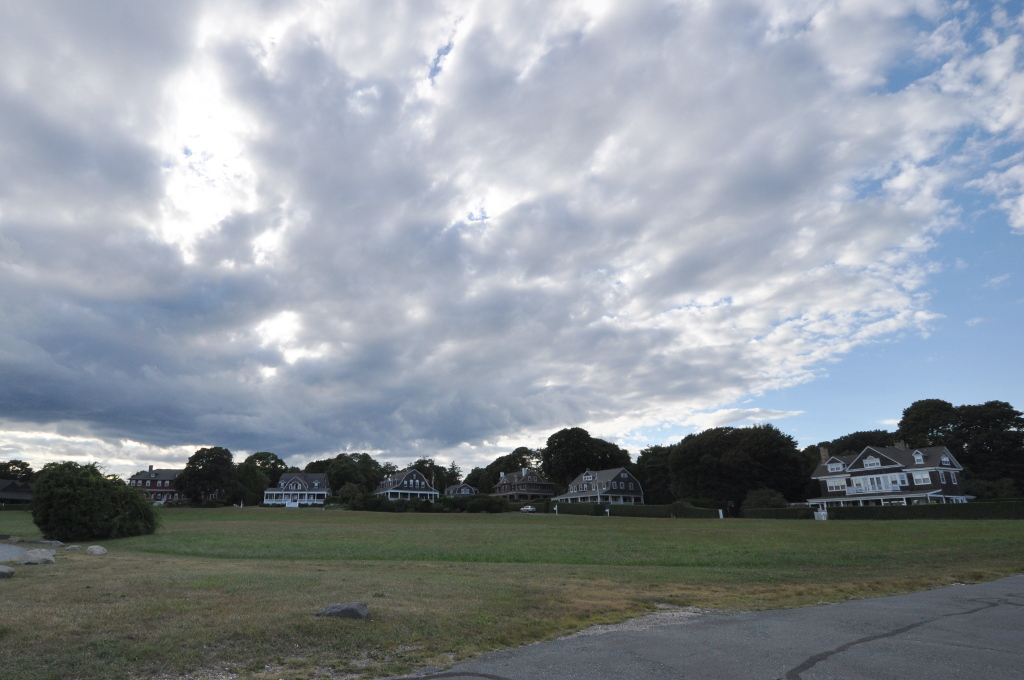

- Location within Rhode Island Location within the United States
- Location: Roughly bounded by Whittier Rd., Prudence Ln., Emerson Rd., Conanicus Ave., Knowles Ct., Coronado St. & Longfellow Rd., Jamestown, Rhode Island
- Coordinates: 41°29′57″N 71°22′8″W
- Area: 58 acres (23 ha)
- Built: 1895
- NRHP reference No.: 11000674
- Added to NRHP: September 5, 2011

The Shoreby Hill Historic District encompasses a major residential subdivision north of the central business district of Jamestown, Rhode Island. The 58-acre (23 ha) district was farmland until the late 19th century, and was laid out in two phases. The first, in 1898 includes the lower portion of the area, rising from the shore of Jamestown Harbor; the upper portion was laid out in 1911. The lower portion's layout is in part determined by its hill topography, with winding roads, while the upper portion has a more rectilinear grid street pattern. The district is roughly bounded on the east by Jamestown Harbor, on the north by Emerson Road, Prudence Lane, and Whittier Road, on the west by Plymouth Road (only as far as Longfellow Road), and Coronado Street, and on the south by Knowles Court. The area was designed by Ernest W. Bowditch as an exclusive and fashionable summer resort area, with larger houses on well-proportioned lots. The ninety houses in the district are predominantly shingle style.

The district was listed on the National Register of Historic Places in 2011.

== See also ==
- National Register of Historic Places listings in Newport County, Rhode Island
