= Marla Romash =

Democratic political consultant and speechwriter and pastry chef

Marla Romash is a Democratic political consultant and speechwriter and pastry chef based out of Jamestown, Rhode Island. She served as communications director to Vice President Al Gore in The White House and press secretary on his 2000 presidential campaign. Prior to working for Vice President Gore, Romash was a TV and print reporter. She has worked with EMILY's List, and worked on the senate campaigns of Senators Elizabeth Warren and Richard Blumenthal. Romash moved to Jamestown, Rhode Island in 2016, where she continues to operate a pastry and cookie business.
