= Hazard Farmstead (Joyner Site RI-706) =

Coordinates: 41°31′37″N 71°23′10″W

- U.S. National Register of Historic Places
- Location within Rhode Island Location within the United States
- Location: Jamestown, Rhode Island
- Area: 0.7 acres (0.28 ha)
- NRHP reference No.: 84000365
- Added to NRHP: November 1, 1984

The Hazard Farmstead (Joyner Site RI-706) (also known as Joyner Archeological Site RI-706) is a historic archaeological site in Jamestown, Rhode Island. It is the location of a major American Indian settlement whose artifacts have been dated from 2,500 BC to 1,000 AD. It appeared to be occupied seasonally from late summer to fall, and was intensively used during those times.

The site was added to the National Register of Historic Places in 1984. It was negatively affected by road work associated with the construction of the Jamestown Verrazzano Bridge and changes to Rhode Island Route 138, although data was recovered from the site by salvage archaeology first.

== See also ==
- National Register of Historic Places listings in Newport County, Rhode Island
