= Jamestown Bridge =

Now-demolished bridge in Rhode Island

Jamestown Bridge Old Jamestown Bridge
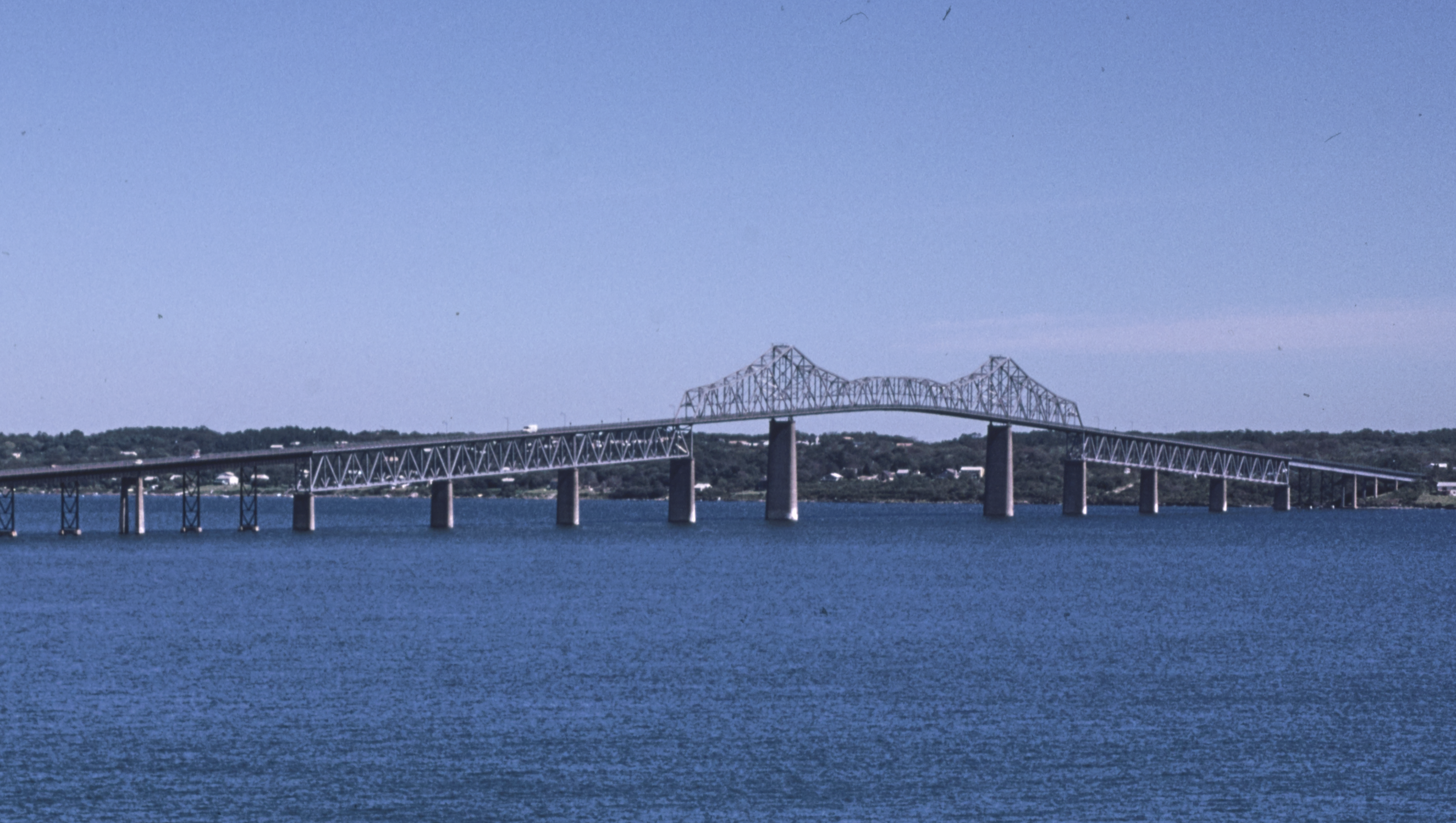
- The Jamestown Bridge
- Coordinates: 41°31′42.14″N 71°24′11.34″W
- Carries: 2 lanes of Route 138
- Crosses: West passage of Narragansett Bay
- Locale: North Kingstown and Jamestown, Rhode Island
- Official name: Jamestown Bridge
- Maintained by: Jamestown Bridge Commission (1940–1969); Rhode Island Department of Transportation (1969–1992)

Characteristics
- Design: Cantilever truss
- Total length: 6,892 feet (2,101 m)
- Width: 22 feet (6.7 m)
- Height: 235 feet (72 m)
- Longest span: 640 feet (200 m)
- Clearance below: 135 feet (41 m)

History
- Construction start: January 1939
- Construction end: July 1940
- Opened: July 27, 1940
- Closed: October 8, 1992 (demolished on April 18, 2006)

Statistics
- Toll: $0.25 (originally $0.90) (collected 1940–1969)

The Jamestown Bridge (usually referred to as the Old Jamestown Bridge to avoid confusion with the Jamestown Verrazzano Bridge) was a cantilever truss bridge that connected Conanicut Island to mainland North Kingstown, Rhode Island, spanning the West passage of Narragansett Bay. The bridge opened to traffic in 1940, replacing ferry service as the primary connection for the town of Jamestown. It was constructed for just over $3 million (approximately $51.1 million in 2023), which was paid for by tolls until June 28, 1969. The bridge has a total length of 6,892 feet (2,101 m) and was the third longest in Rhode Island at the time of its destruction, ranking behind its replacement, the adjacent 7,350-foot (2,240 m) Jamestown Verrazzano Bridge, and the 11,248-foot (3,428 m) Claiborne Pell Newport Bridge connecting Conanicut Island to Aquidneck Island and Newport. The Jamestown Bridge was closed to vehicular traffic on October 8, 1992, and its main span was destroyed through a controlled demolition on April 18, 2006.

== History ==
Navigating around Narragansett Bay had proved troublesome since the colonial era. The first ferry operation began in 1675, providing an alternate to the long route around Providence, Rhode Island. Steam service in the West Passage began in 1888 and reduced travel times, but it was subject to weather conditions. Plans were developed in 1920 for the Jamestown Bridge, stimulated by the Newport Ferry Company's financial troubles. The State of Rhode Island sought funding from the federal government in 1934 to construct bridges over both the West Passage and East Passage of the bay. The plans were well-supported and passed the Rhode Island House of Representatives by a 96-to-1 vote, and were approved by President Franklin Roosevelt. The minor opposition to the bridge's construction was quelled after the 1938 New England hurricane destroyed the ferry docks and one of the ferryboats on September 21, 1938, stopping ferry service.

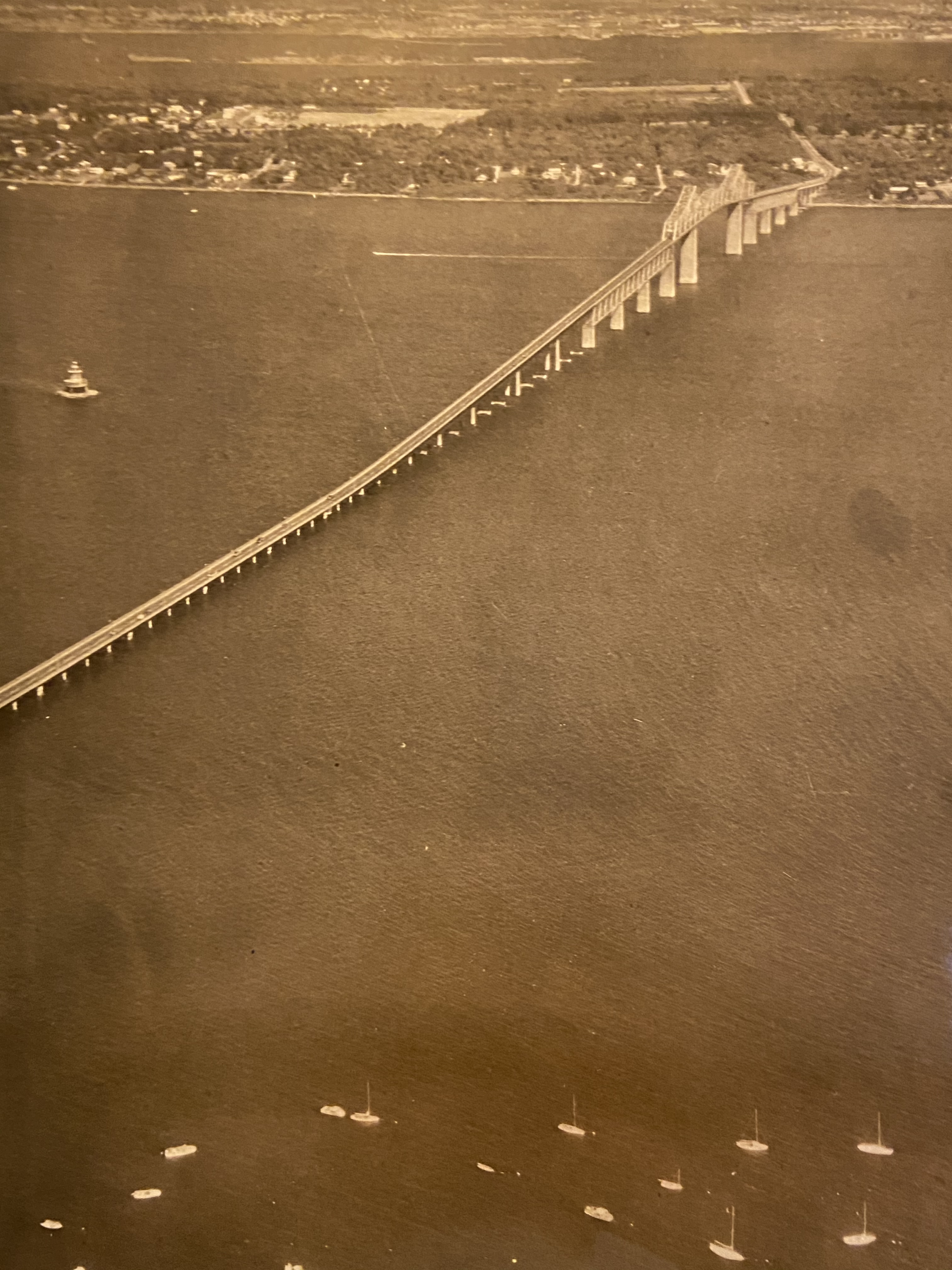
Aerial view looking north east

The bridge was designed by Parsons, Klapp, Brinckerhoff and Douglass and called for a 6,982-foot-long (2,128 m) bridge with 69 spans at a total cost of $3 million ($51.6 million in 2023). The bridge was delayed by two months, but it was completed $100,000 ($1.72 million in 2023) under budget. A crew of nearly 200 constructed the bridge; there was one fatality during the construction of the coffer dams on September 18, 1939. The bridge opened to traffic on July 27, 1940, and a 90 cent toll ($20.20 in 2024) was charged on the North Kingstown side. The toll was removed in 1969, following the completion of the Newport (Pell) Bridge. A formal dedication was held on the weekend of August 2-4, 1940, with a military marine parade on the final day.

== Structure ==
The bridge consisted of 69 spans with a large continuous cantilever Warren truss centerpiece. The 640-foot (200 m) main span was 135 feet (41 m) above the western portion of the Narragansett Bay. The bridge was long thought to be a danger to motorists, consisting of only two undivided lanes, and during the summer months, the eastbound lane was usually at a standstill due to vacationers traveling to Newport via the main route from the mainland. Its steep climb proved challenging for some vehicles and with no passing lanes or shoulders, hazardous conditions resulted when stalled vehicles were on the bridge. The roadway deck through the cantilevered span was an open steel-grid deck, similar to that of the Castleton Bridge just south of Albany, New York, or the now-demolished Sikorsky Bridge on the Merritt Parkway in Connecticut. The deck proved to be extremely slippery when wet. After the bridge began to show structural problems with age, RIDOT began construction of the Jamestown-Verrazano Bridge in 1985. The new bridge, which opened on October 17, 1992, includes four divided lanes of traffic with shoulders.

== Service ==
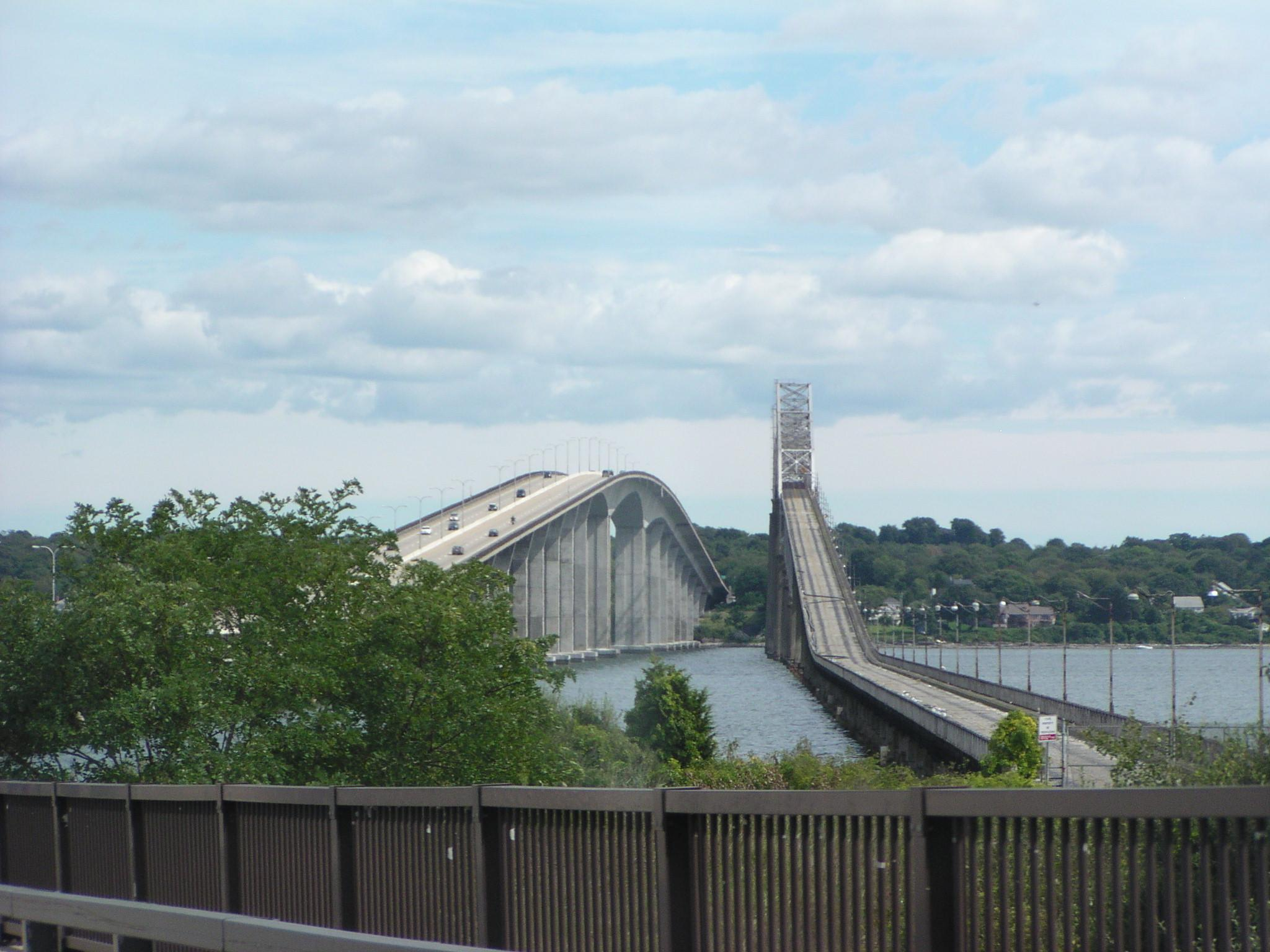
Old & New Jamestown Bridges

The bridge is reported to have inspired fear in motorists because of its open grates, which allowed the motorists to peer down into the Narragansett Bay about 150 feet (46 m) below, and because the bridge would shake in high winds. Head-on collisions on the 22-foot-wide (6.7 m) undivided bridge were reported to be common, and the steel grid pavement was noted as "treacherous" when wet.

== Demolition ==
The United States Coast Guard had long declared the Jamestown Bridge to be a navigation hazard and requested that the state of Rhode Island dismantle the eastern two thirds of it. The Sierra Club, an environmental organization, suggested to instead turn the bridge into a bike route and walkway. However, the aging structure proved to be in far worse condition than previously thought, prompting officials to go ahead with removing the entire structure.

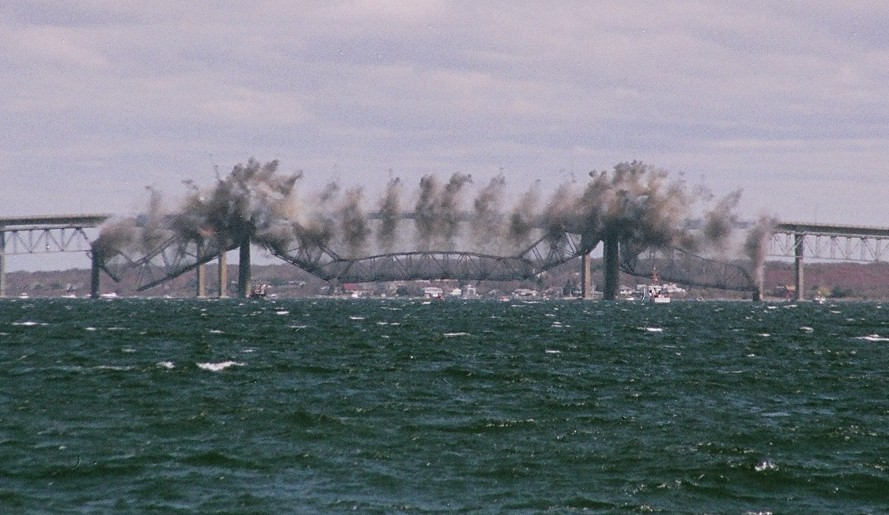
The Jamestown Bridge was destroyed in a controlled demolition in April 2006.

On April 18, 2006, the main span of the Jamestown Bridge was brought down by Department of Transportation employee Wilfred Hernandez, using 75 pounds (34 kg) of RDX explosives and 350 shaped charges. TNT charges were later used to remove the concrete piers. On May 18, 2006, crews imploded the trusses that once carried the side spans. Throughout 2006, workers removed the remaining support piers and low-level approach spans west of the main channel. The extreme western portion of the bridge was not demolished with the remains of the bridge during 2006, as officials planned to renovate and convert it into a fishing pier, but ultimately it was removed in 2010 when renovation and cleanup proved too costly. That last part was then demolished in the same year, although the western abutment and the abandoned roadbed leading to it, remain. The total cost for removal of the Jamestown Bridge was US$22 million ($30 million in 2023). The demolished steel superstructure was floated away for recycling, while concrete from the bridge piers was used to create artificial reefs below the mouth of Narragansett Bay.
