= Beavertail Lighthouse =

- Beavertail Light
- U.S. National Register of Historic Places
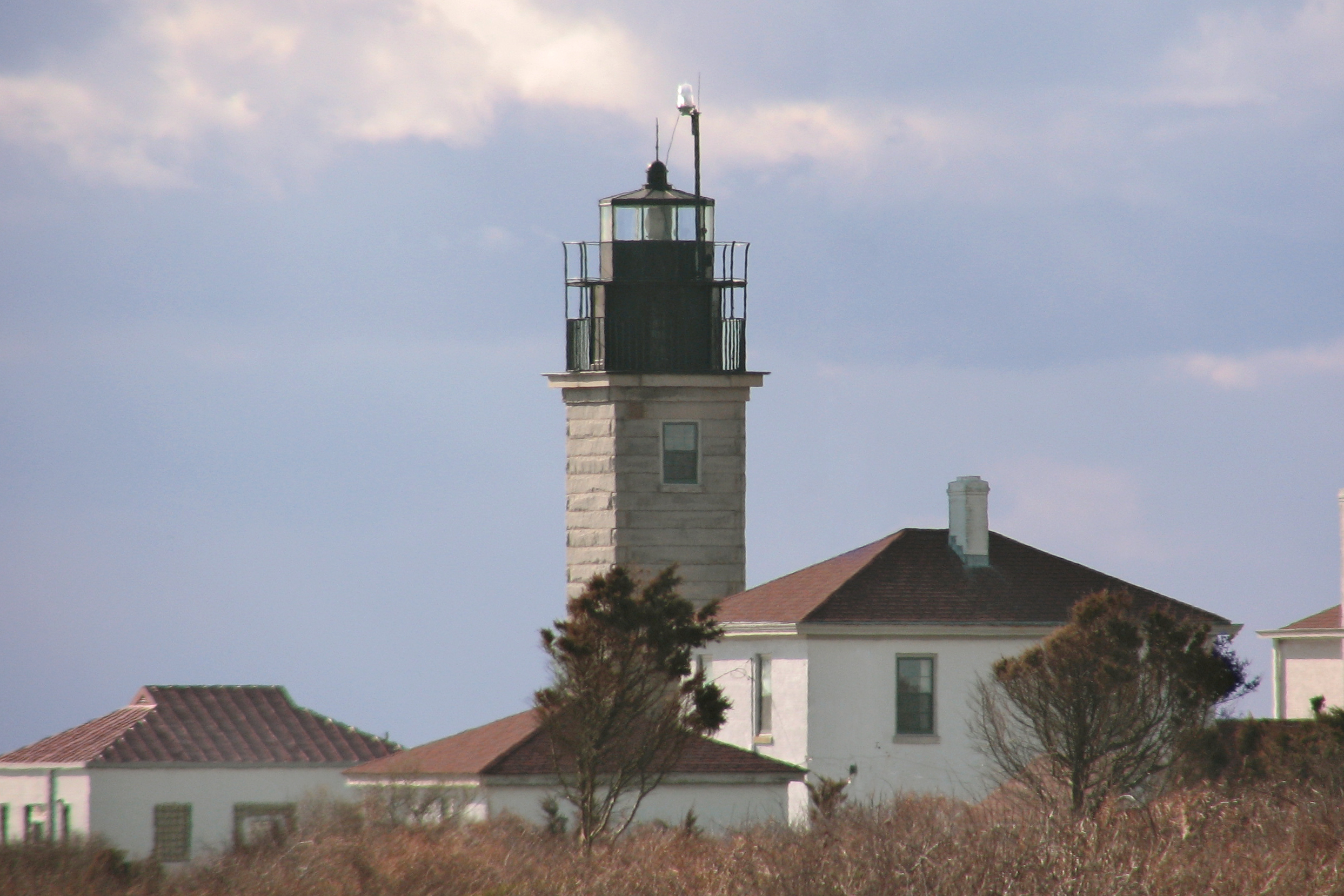

- Location within Rhode Island
- Nearest city: Jamestown, RI
- Coordinates: 41.446°N 71.3993°W
- Area: 4 acres (1.6 ha)
- Built: 1856
- MPS: Lighthouses of Rhode Island TR (AD)
- NRHP reference No.: 77000024
- Added to NRHP: December 12, 1977

Beavertail Lighthouse was built in 1856 and is the premier lighthouse in Rhode Island, marking the entrance to Narragansett Bay. The 64-foot (20 m) lighthouse lies on the southernmost point of Conanicut Island in the town of Jamestown, Rhode Island in Beavertail State Park, on a site where beacons have stood since the early 18th century. The light provides navigation for boats and ships entering Narragansett Bay in the East Passage between Conanicut Island and Newport, Rhode Island on Aquidneck Island. Other lighthouses are visible from Beavertail Lighthouse, such as Castle Hill Lighthouse, Point Judith Light, and Rose Island Light.

== History ==
Records of the town of Jamestown from 1712 make reference to a beacon, and they mention a watch house in 1705. A wooden tower was built in 1749 (attributed to architect Peter Harrison), and the light became the third lighthouse established in the Thirteen Colonies, known at the time as "Newport Light". A fire was lit at the top of the tower, as was common for the time. Four years later, it burned down and was replaced by a stone tower.

British sailors retreating from Newport near the end of the American Revolutionary War left a trail of destruction behind them in 1779. This included burning the lighthouse and removing the optics, which left the light dark for the rest of the war.

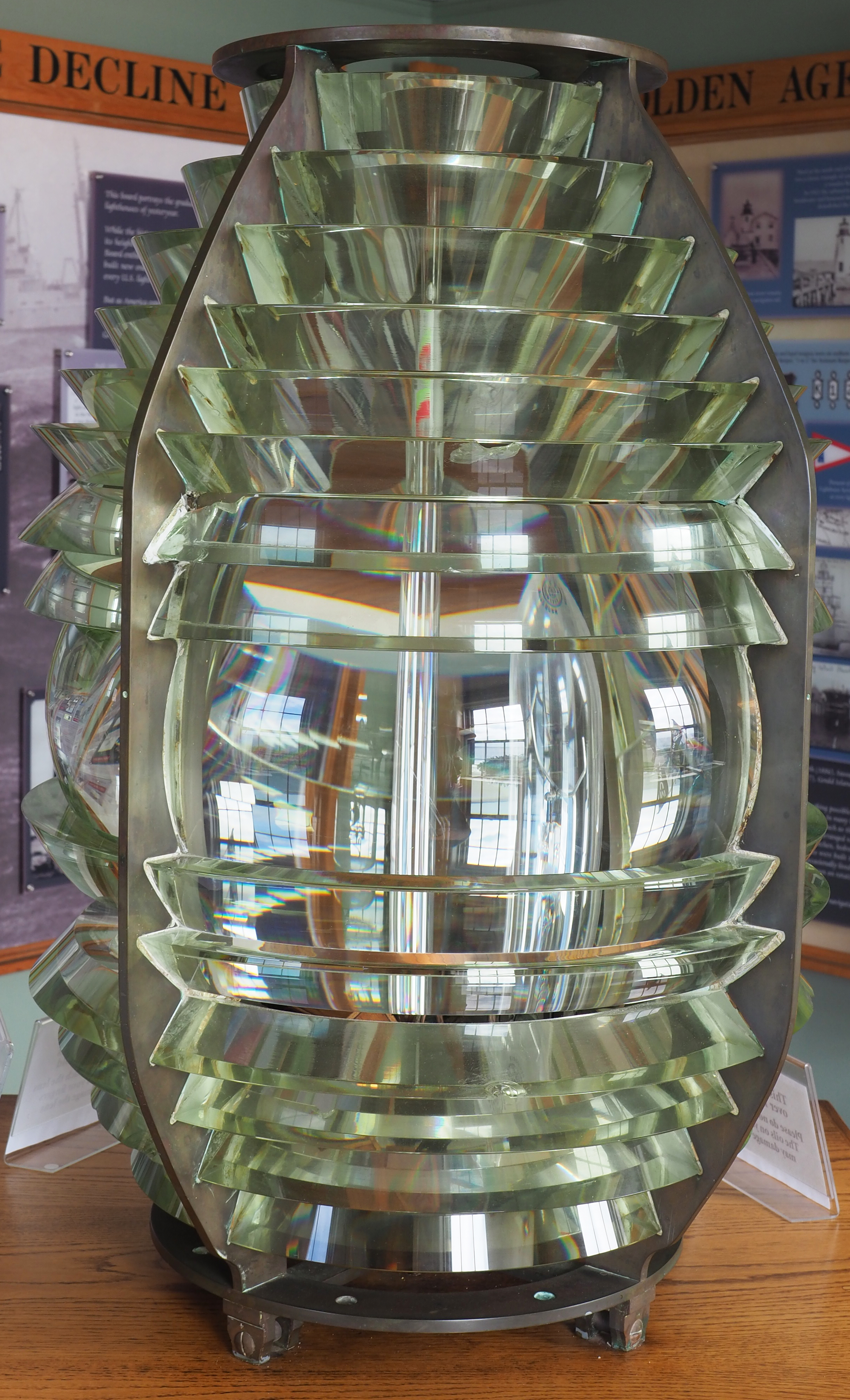
4th order fixed "beehive" Fresnel lens. This was the last such lens installed at Beavertail Light in Jamestown, Rhode Island. Source: https://web.archive.org/web/20170925040038/http://www.beavertaillight.org/history.html

In 1856, the tower was replaced with the current tower, made of granite which is 10 ft (3.0 m) square and 64 feet (20 m) from ground to beacon. A 3rd order Fresnel lens was placed in service, and it was the site of numerous fog-signal tests over the next 40 years under the supervision of the United States Lighthouse Board. In 1898, quarters were added to the keeper's house for an assistant keeper; the assistant helped with fog-signaling, among other things.

The whistle house was destroyed during the 1938 hurricane, revealing the original base for the 1749 structure which sits 100 feet (30 m) from the current tower. Whale Rock can be seen a few miles southwest of Beavertail Point. Whale Rock Lighthouse and its keeper Walter Eberle were swept into the waters of Narragansett Bay during the hurricane of 1938; Eberle's body was never recovered.

In 1939, the US Coast Guard took command of all lighthouses and navigational aids, and in 1989 Beavertail light was automated as part of a program by the Coast Guard. The building was restored and opened to the public in 1989, following a joint effort by the US Coast Guard, Rhode Island Parks Management, the Rhode Island Department of Environmental Management, and the town of Jamestown. In 1993, the Beavertail Lighthouse Museum Association (BLMA) was established to oversee the operations of the Beavertail Lighthouse Museum, which is located in the assistant keeper's house. The museum includes a Fresnel lens and the history of many Rhode Island lighthouses.

== Keepers and assistants ==
Keeper	years	Assistant	years
Abel Franklin	1749–1755		
Jerathmeel (John) Bowers	1770		
Josiah Arnold	1770–1783		
William Martin	1783–1803		
Phillip Caswell	1803–1818		
George Shearman	1816–1829		
Sylvester R. Hazard	1829–1844		
Robert H. Weeden	1844–1848		
Mrs. Demaris A. Weeden	1848–1857		
Joshua B. Rathburn	1857–1858	Henry Rathburn	1857–1859
Silas G. Shaw	1858–1862	Henry Rathburn	1857–1859
Silas G. Shaw	1858–1862	E. E. Taylor	1859
Silas G. Shaw	1858–1862	William B. Spooner	1859
Silas G. Shaw	1858–1862	William H. Carr	1859–1861
Silas G. Shaw	1858–1862	Benjamin W. Walker	1861–1862
Welcome Weeden	1862	Albert Caswell	1862–1863
Peter J. Lee	1862–1863	Albert Caswell	1862–1863
Silas G. Shaw	1863–1869	Christopher Austen	1863
Silas G. Shaw	1863–1869	William Batchelder	1863–1864
Silas G. Shaw	1863–1869	Ann N. Shaw	1864–1869
Thomas King	1869–1873	Patrick McNamara	1869
Thomas King	1869–1873	Andrew King	1869–1873
William W. Wales	1873–1895	Alexander F. Fraser	1873–1875
William W. Wales	1873–1895	Charles H. Lake	1875
William W. Wales	1873–1895	George A. Brown	1875–1885
William W. Wales	1873–1895	John S. Wales	1885–1888
William W. Wales	1873–1895	George B. Wales	1888–1895
William W. Wales	1873–1895	John S. Wales	1895–1915
George B. Wales	1895–1900	John S. Wales	1895–1915
Joshua A. Overton	1900–1915	John S. Wales	1895–1915
John S. Wales	1915–1919	George T. Manders	1915–1919
George T. Manders	1919–1937	Stanley H. Roode	1919–1920
George T. Manders	1919–1937	Edward A. Donahue	1920–1948
Carl. S. Chellis	1938–1948	Edward A. Donahue	1920–1948
Edward A. Donahue	1948–1953	Dominic M Turillo	1951–1953
Dominic M. Turillo	1953–1965	Ronald Bugenske	1960–1964
Dominic M. Turillo	1953–1965	Eugene E. Race	1964 - 1965
Robert J. Hart	1965	Eugene E. Race	1965
Gerald T. Shrieves	1965 - 1967	Eugene E. Race	1965 - 1967
Gerald T. Shrieves	1965 - 1967	John L. Williams	1967
John K. Martin	1967 - 1969	John L. Williams	1967 - at least 1968
John E. Baxter, Jr.	1969–1972	George J. Light	1969–1971
John E. Baxter, Jr.	1969–1972	Dennis D. Regula	1971 - 1972

== See also ==
- National Register of Historic Places listings in Newport County, Rhode Island

== Gallery ==
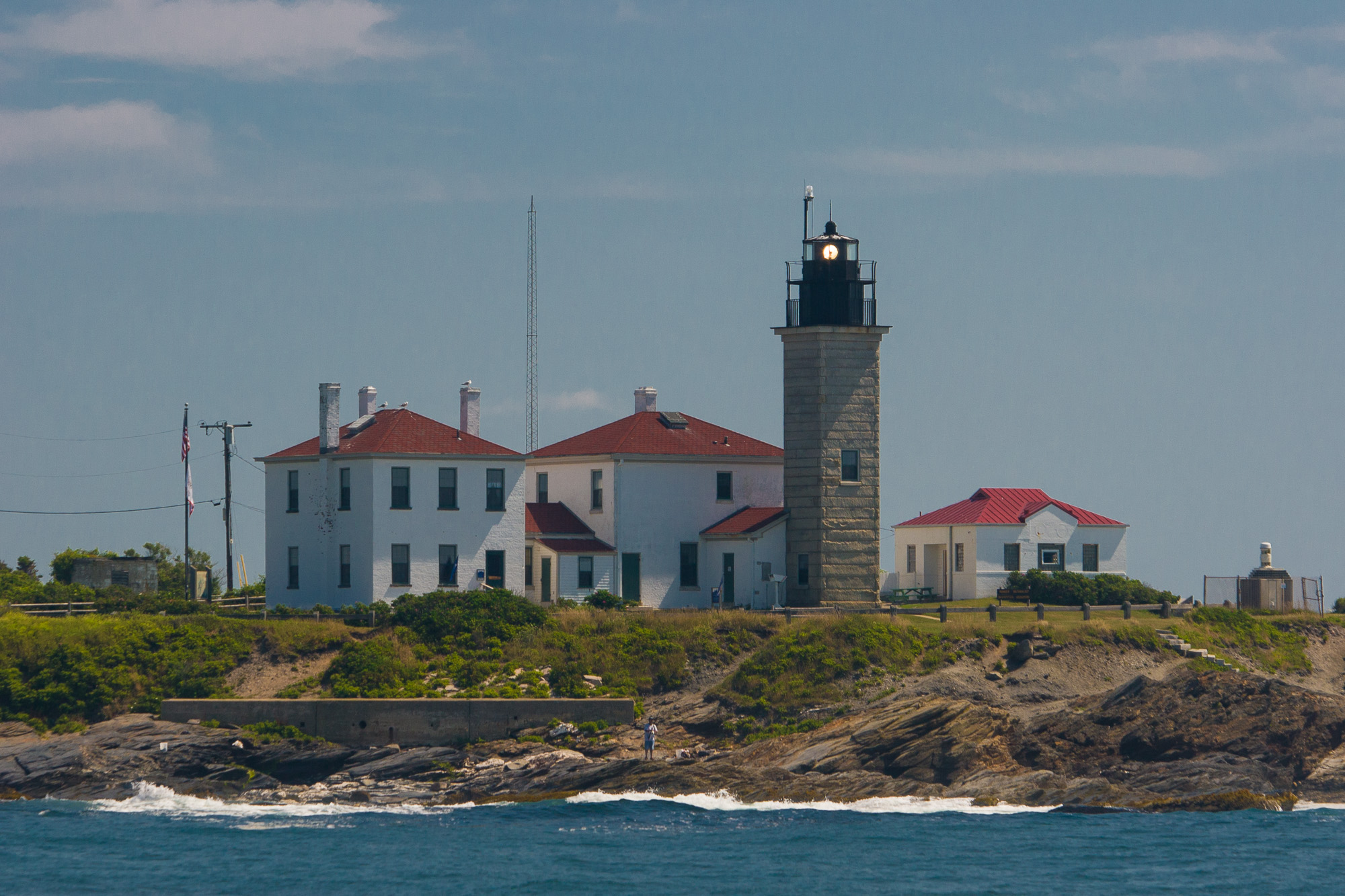
Beavertail Lighthouse in 2007

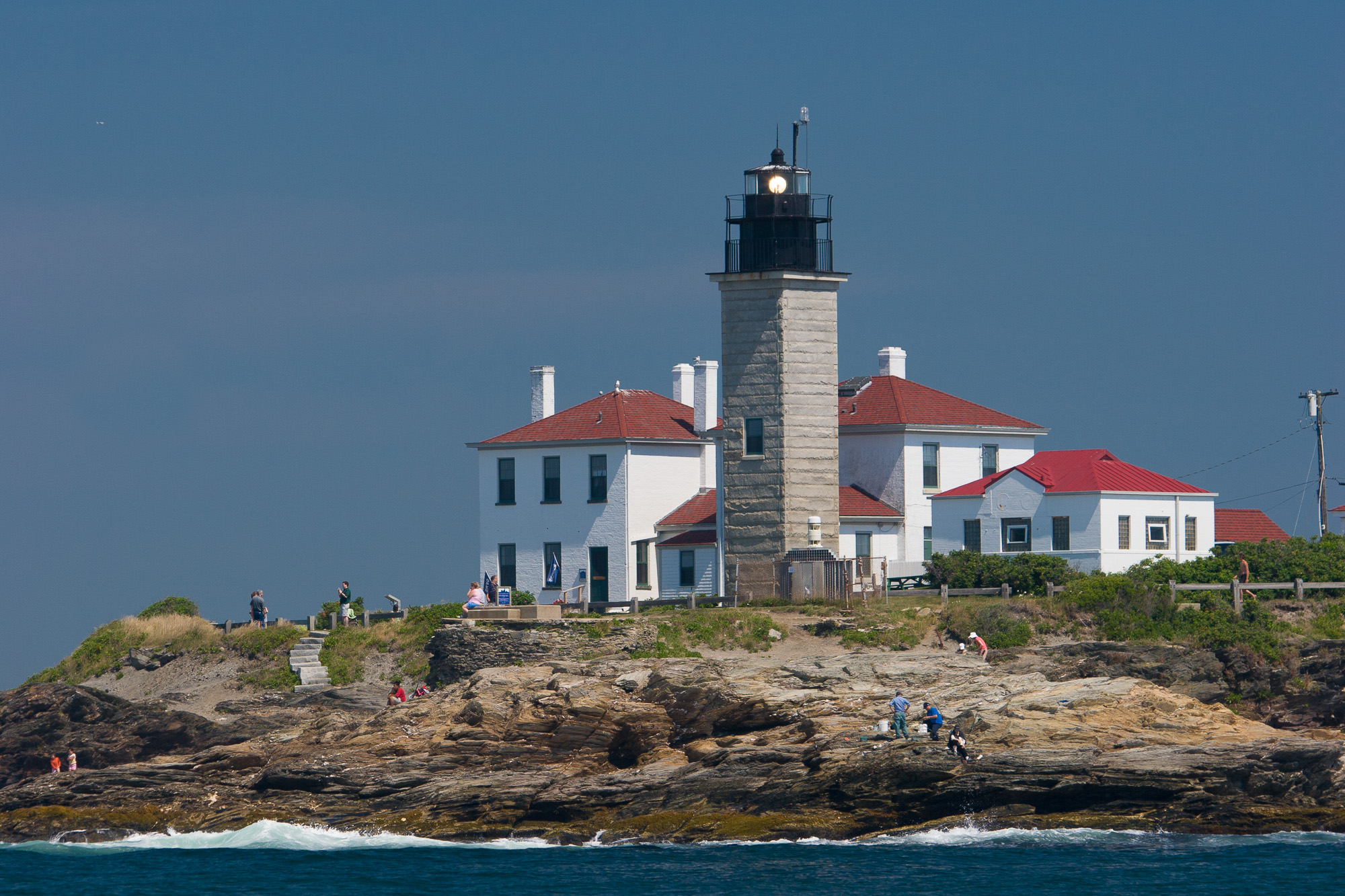
Beavertail Lighthouse in 2007

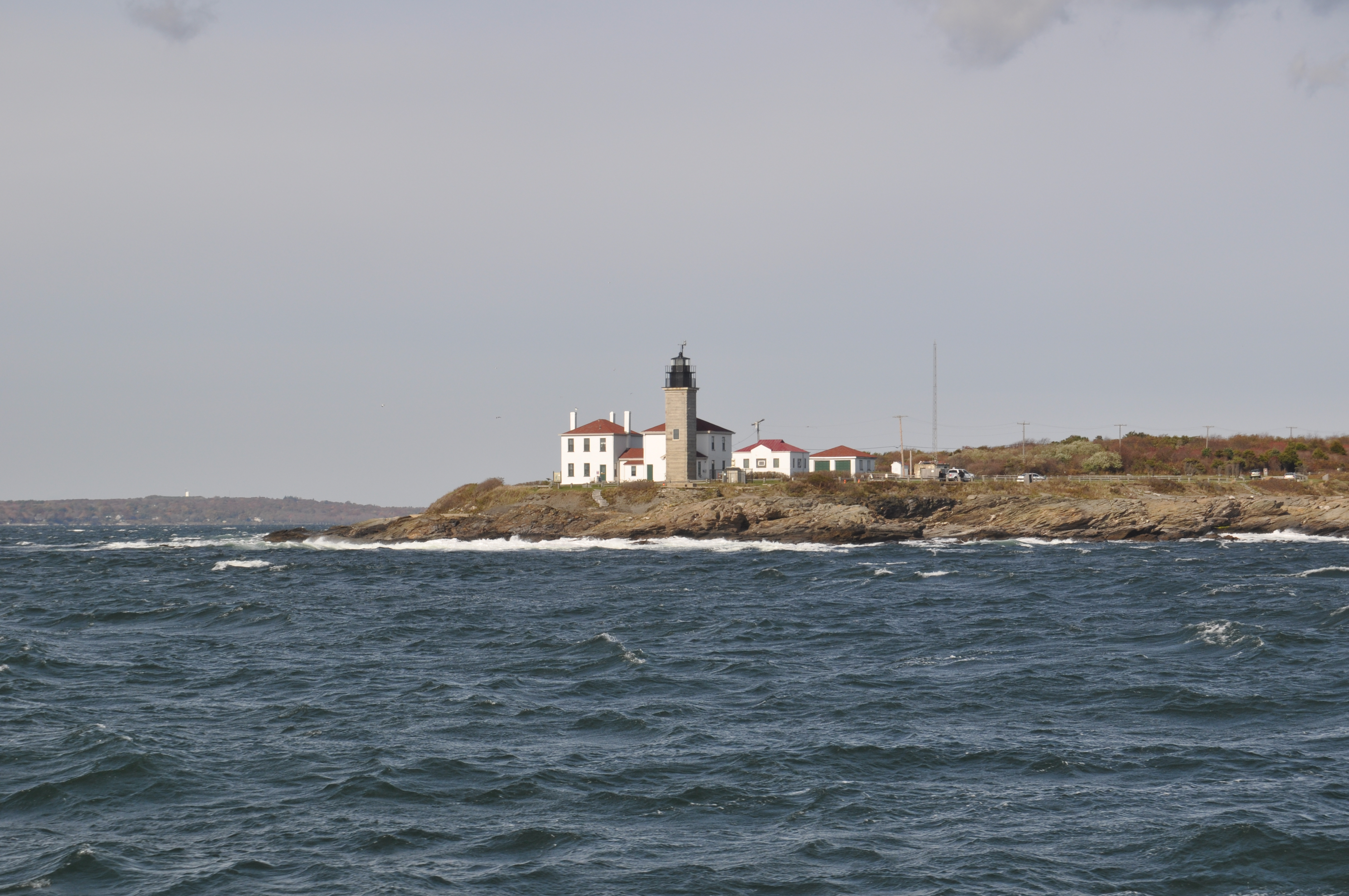
Beavertail Lighthouse in 2010
