= Old Friends Archeological Site =

- U.S. National Register of Historic Places
- Location: Jamestown, Rhode Island
- NRHP reference No.: 95001269
- Added to NRHP: November 7, 1995

Old Friends Archeological Site (also known as RI—703) is an archaeological historical site in Jamestown, Rhode Island.

The site was added in 1995 to the National Register of Historic Places.

== See also ==
- National Register of Historic Places listings in Newport County, Rhode Island
