= Thomas Carr Farmstead Site (Keeler Site RI-707) =

- U.S. National Register of Historic Places
- Nearest city: Jamestown, Rhode Island
- Area: 0.2 acres (0.081 ha)
- NRHP reference No.: 84000356
- Added to NRHP: November 1, 1984

The Thomas Carr Farmstead Site (Keeler Site RI-707) is a historic archaeological site in Jamestown, Rhode Island. Located in the vicinity of Tashtassuc Road (the connector road paralleling Rhode Island Route 138) and Eldred Avenue, the site was the farmstead for the locally prominent Carr family from the late 18th century into the 19th century.

The site added to the National Register of Historic Places in 1984.

== See also ==
- National Register of Historic Places listings in Newport County, Rhode Island
