= Jamestown Verrazzano Bridge =

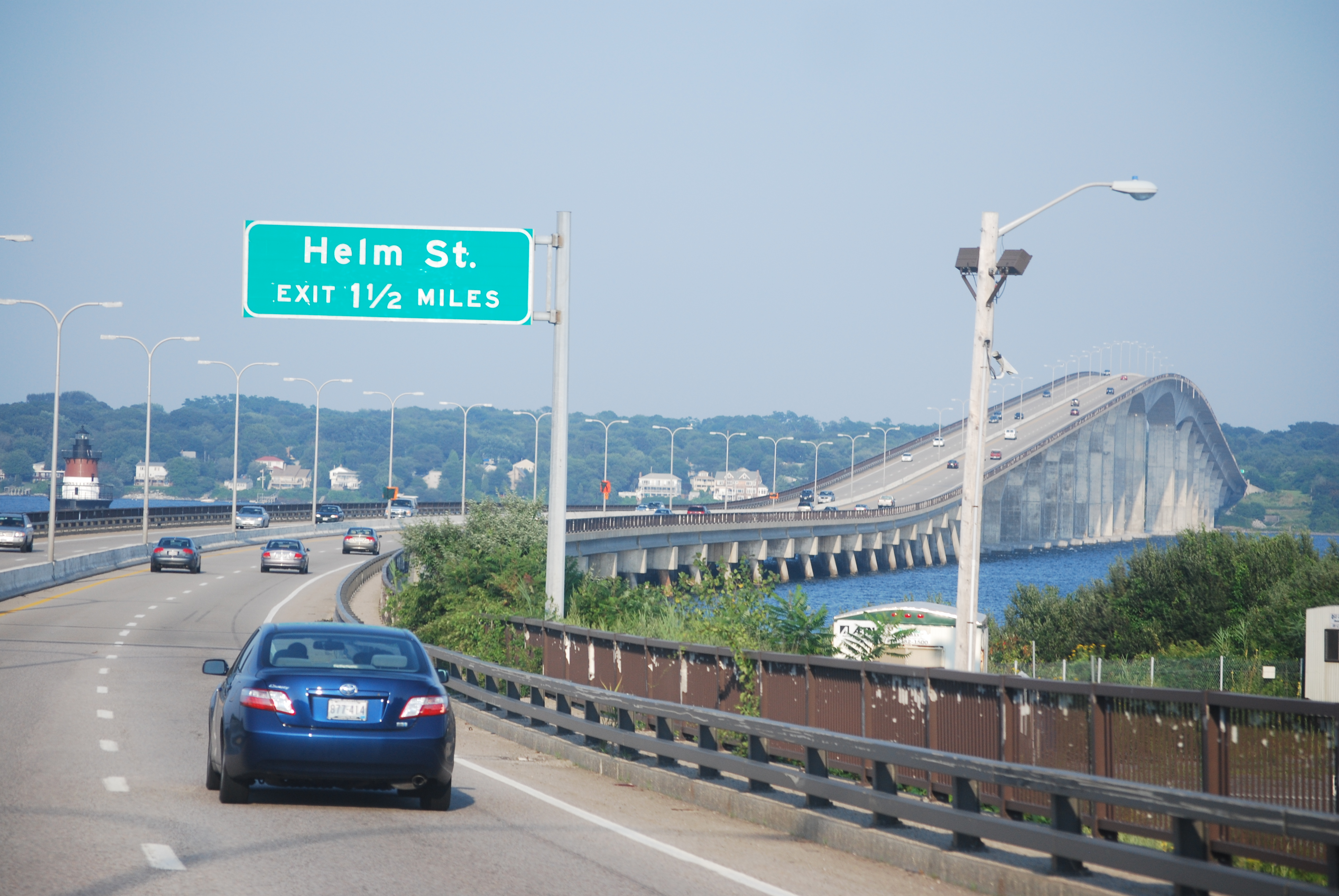
- The Jamestown Verrazzano Bridge in August 2009
- Coordinates: 41.5279°N 71.4037°W
- Carries: 4 lanes of Route 138
- Crosses: West Passage of Narragansett Bay
- Locale: North Kingstown, Rhode Island to Jamestown, Rhode Island
- Maintained by: Rhode Island Turnpike and Bridge Authority (RITBA)

Characteristics
- Design: post-tensioned, double-cell concrete box girder
- Material: Concrete
- Total length: 7,350 feet (2,240 m)
- Width: 72 feet (22 m)
- Height: 135 feet (41 m)
- Longest span: 636 feet (194 m)

History
- Construction start: 1985; 41 years ago
- Construction end: 1992; 34 years ago
- Opened: October 20, 1992; 33 years ago

Location
- Interactive map of Jamestown Verrazzano Bridge

The Jamestown Verrazzano Bridge is a concrete box girder highway bridge which spans the West Passage of Narragansett Bay in Rhode Island. It is part of Rhode Island Route 138 and is on the route to Newport, Rhode Island for traffic heading northbound from Interstate 95.

== Construction and design ==
The bridge is named for Italian explorer Giovanni da Verrazzano. Construction began in 1985 and was completed in 1992, originally consisting of two undivided lanes and built alongside the Jamestown Bridge which had served the same route since 1940. The older bridge was demolished in April 2006.

It is a post-tensioned, double-cell concrete box girder bridge with four travel lanes separated by a concrete Jersey barrier. It links North Kingstown, Rhode Island with the island town of Jamestown, Rhode Island, with a total length of 7,350 feet (2,240 m). It has safety walkways on both sides, which are not accessible to pedestrians.

The bridge was listed as structurally deficient in 2007, despite being only 15 years old at the time, due to small cracks found in some of the box girder segments. The cracks were repaired in 2008.

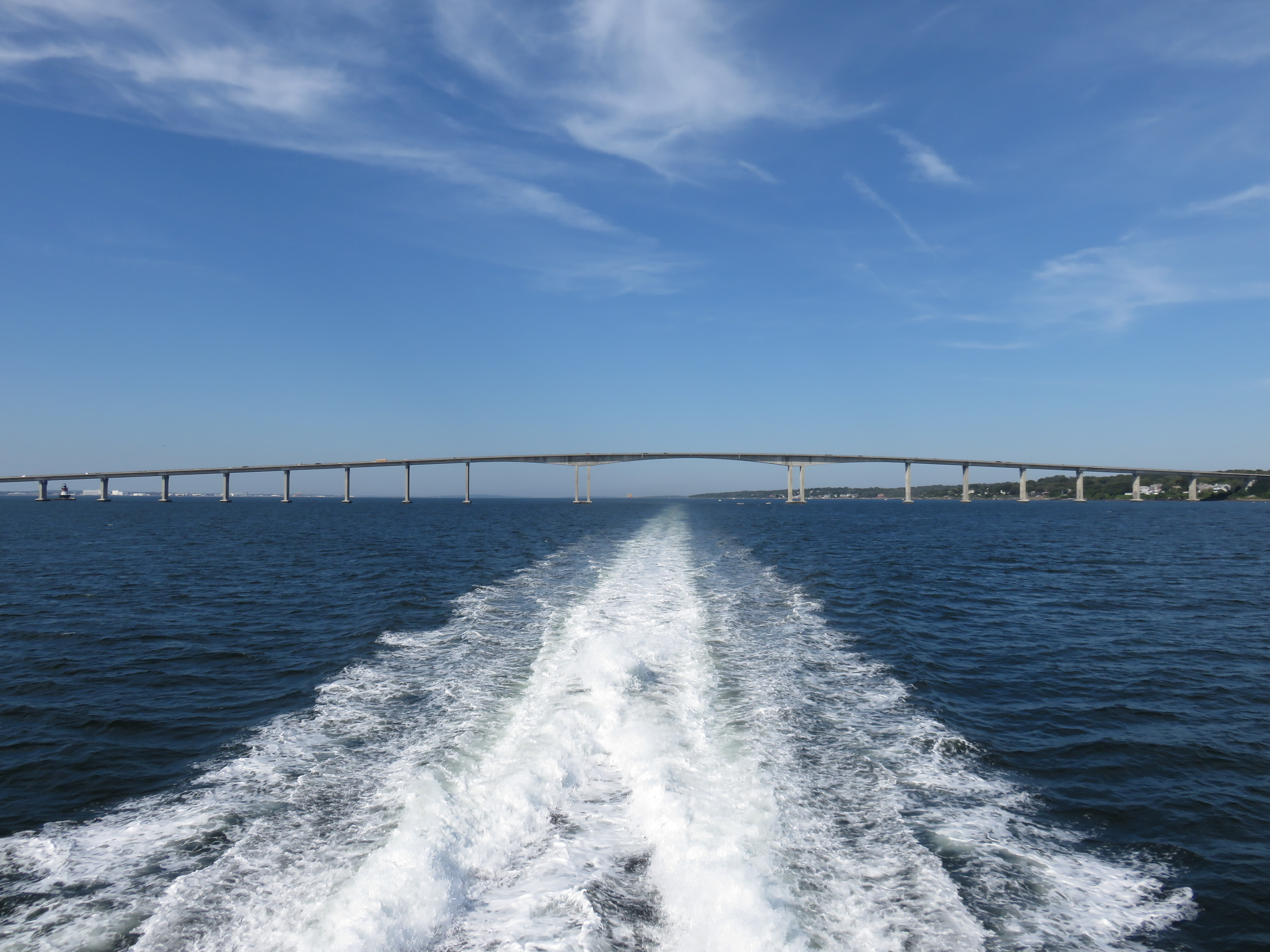
Jamestown Verrazzano Bridge seen from Narragansett Bay.
