= Jamestown, Rhode Island =

- Town
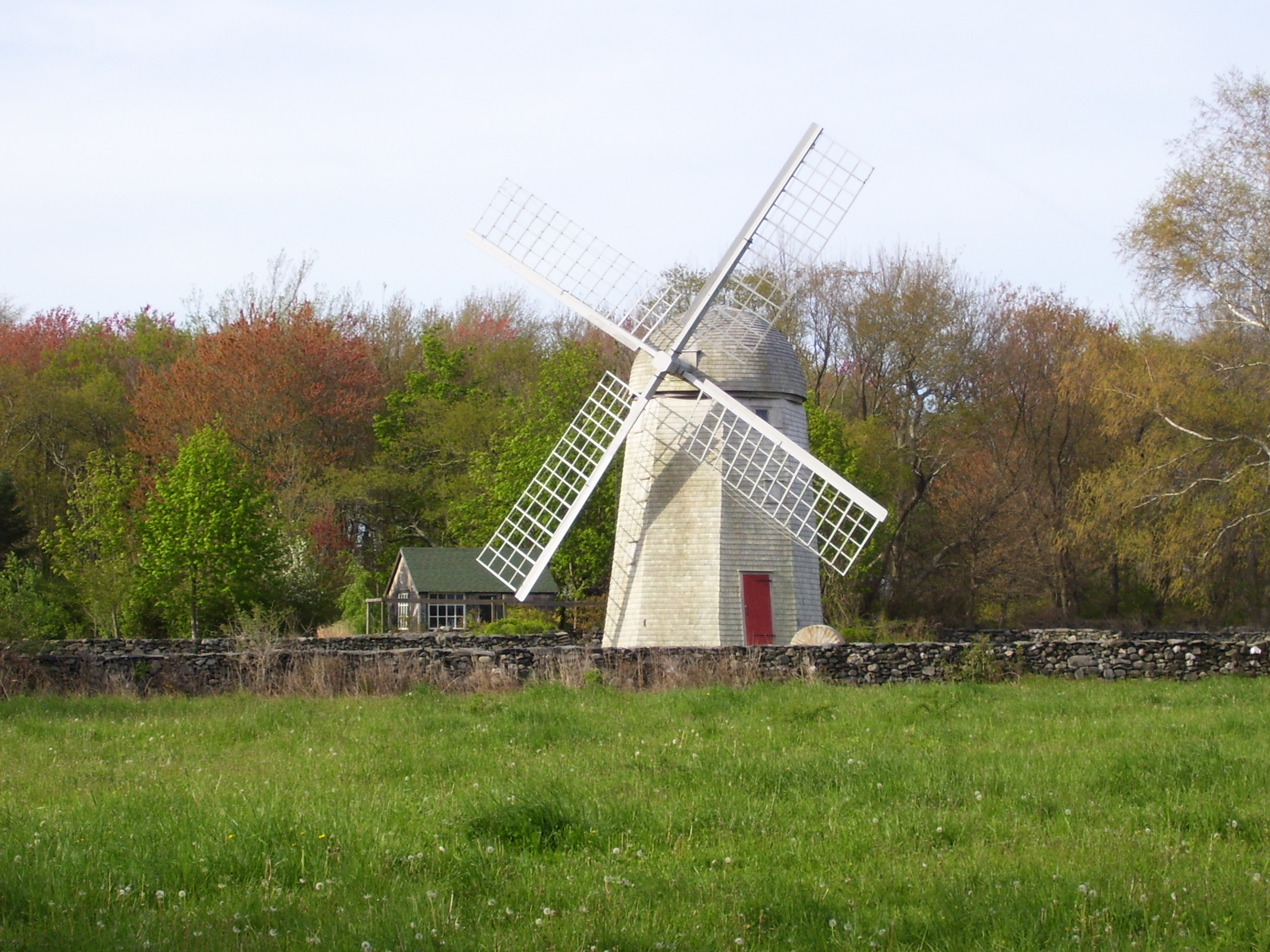
- Jamestown Windmill, built in 1787

- Seal Wordmark

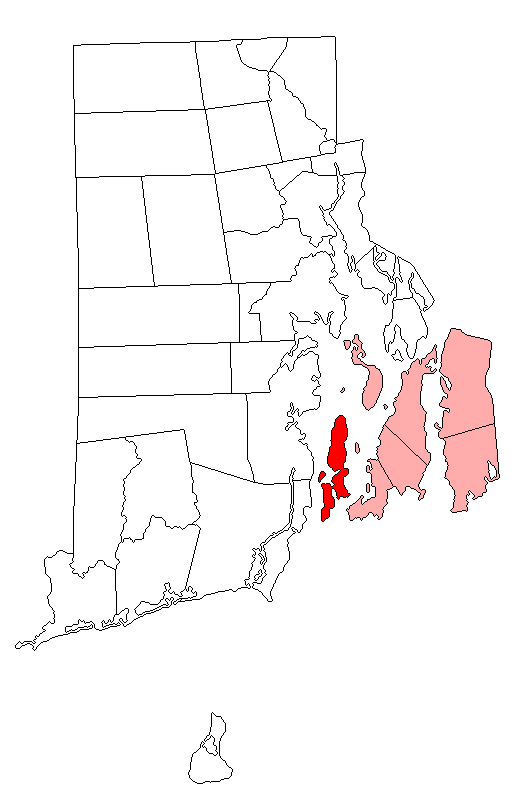
- Location of Jamestown in Newport County, Rhode Island
- Coordinates: 41°31′N 71°22′W
- Country: United States
- State: Rhode Island
- County: Newport

Government
  - Type: Council - Administrator form of government
  - Administrator: Jamie Hainsworth
  - Town Council: Michael G. White (D); Mary E. Meagher (D); Nancy E. Beye (I); Randall White (D); Erik Brine (D)
  - Moderator: John A. Murphy (D)

Area
  - Total: 35.3 sq mi (91.5 km^{2})
  - Land: 9.7 sq mi (25.1 km^{2})
  - Water: 25.6 sq mi (66.4 km^{2})
- Elevation: 62 ft (19 m)

Population (2020)
  - Total: 5,559
  - Density: 574/sq mi (221.5/km^{2})
- Time zone: UTC−5 (Eastern (EST))
  - Summer (DST): UTC−4 (EDT)
- ZIP code: 02835
- Area code: 401
- FIPS code: 44-36820
- GNIS feature ID: 1220061
- Website: Town website

Jamestown is a town in Newport County, Rhode Island, United States. The population was 5,559 at the 2020 census. Jamestown is situated almost entirely on Conanicut Island, the second largest island in Narragansett Bay. It also includes the uninhabited Dutch Island and Gould Island.

== Geography ==
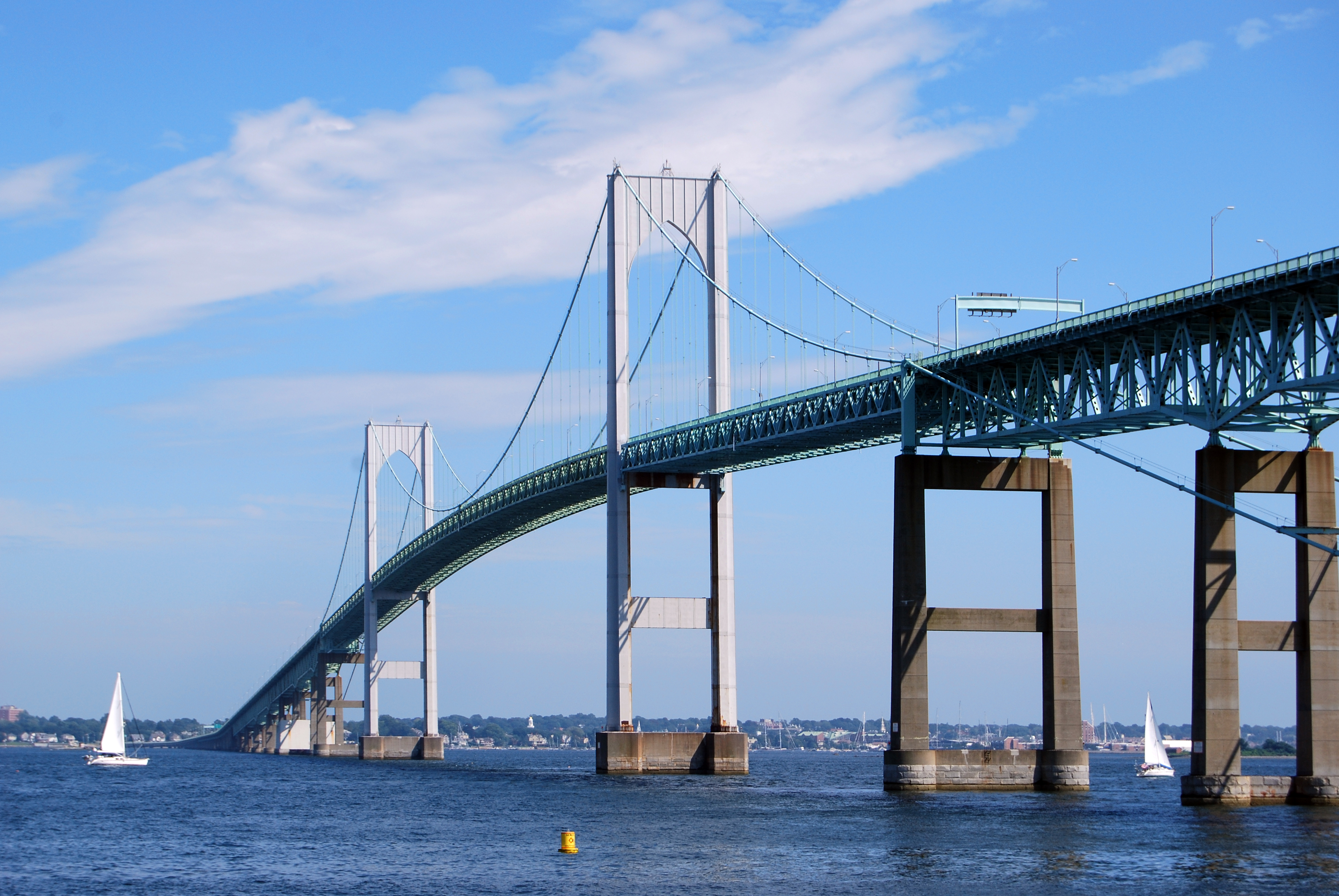
The Newport Bridge connects Jamestown with Newport, a city on Aquidneck Island

According to the United States Census Bureau, the town has an area of 35.3 square miles (91 km^{2}), of which 9.7 square miles (25 km^{2}) is land and 25.6 square miles (66 km^{2}) is water. The total area is 72.55% water.

Rhode Island Route 138 is the only state highway in Jamestown, connecting the town and island to North Kingstown to the west (over the Jamestown Verrazzano Bridge) and Newport to the east (over the Claiborne Pell Newport Bridge).

== History ==
In 1524, Italian navigator Giovanni da Verrazzano and his crew visited Narragansett Bay. Dutch Island was used by fur traders c. 1622, and English colonists in 1638 made arrangements with the Native Americans to use Conanicut Island for grazing sheep.

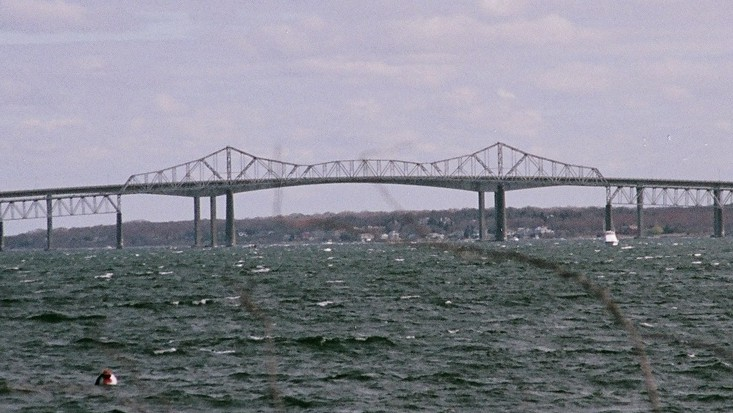
The original Jamestown Bridge, which connected Jamestown with North Kingstown, Rhode Island from 1940 until its demolition in 2006

Ferries were in operation between Conanicut Island and Newport by 1675. In 1678, Conanicut Island was incorporated as the town of Jamestown, when there were about 150 residents. It was named for James, Duke of York, who became King James II in 1685.

By 1710, many of Conanicut Island's current roads were in place. In 1728, the town of Jamestown built a windmill for grinding corn, which used the sea breeze for power since there was no source of running water to turn a waterwheel.

=== American Revolution ===
Two hundred British and Hessian troops, commanded by James Wallace, landed at East Ferry on Conanicut Island on December 10, 1775. They then marched to West Ferry where they burned the ferry house. As they returned to East Ferry, they destroyed many buildings, including 14 homes, which caused more than 200 of Conanicut Island's 556 residents to flee to the mainland.

In December 1776, a British fleet arrived in Narragansett Bay and occupied Newport. The British took over the colonial militia batteries at Fort Dumpling (now part of Fort Wetherill) and the Conanicut Battery at Beavertail, just south of Fort Getty at the end of Battery Lane. They left Narragansett Bay in October 1779; as they departed, they destroyed the fortifications which they had occupied and burned down the Beavertail Lighthouse.

=== 18th and 19th centuries ===
Beavertail Lighthouse was back in operation by 1784, and Jamestown rebuilt the Jamestown Windmill and Quaker Meetinghouse in 1787 that had been destroyed during the occupation.

In 1800, Fort Dumpling was established on the site of previous fortifications overlooking East Passage. A tall stone tower atop the highest cliff could hold eight guns.

The town of Jamestown commissioned a steam-powered ferryboat in 1872 and initiated service between Jamestown and Newport in May 1873. The availability of reliable and comfortable ferry service to and from Newport had a significant impact on agricultural Conanicut Island, and Jamestown became a destination for both day trips and summer vacations.

The 1880s and 1890s saw a construction boom, with hotels, private summer homes, and municipal buildings going up. The island's population tripled between 1870 and 1900.

=== 20th century to the present ===
There was a burst of military fortification activity from 1890 to the end of World War I. The Spanish–American War was a catalyst, beginning in 1898, and work began on Dutch Island's Fort Greble. The War Department bought 31 acres (130,000 m^{2}) for Fort Getty, and fortifications were quickly erected. Summer homes were condemned near Fort Dumpling to establish Fort Wetherill. More land was acquired at Prospect Hill near the Conanicut Battery site for an observation and fire control station, and the government established a torpedo station and test facility on Gould Island. Then, at the end of the First World War, the Conanicut Island fortifications fell into disuse. World War II brought establishment or reactivation of military bases around Narragansett Bay, including Forts Getty, Burnside, and Wetherill on Conanicut Island, Fort Greble on Dutch Island, a torpedo factory on Goat Island, and a torpedo station on Gould Island.

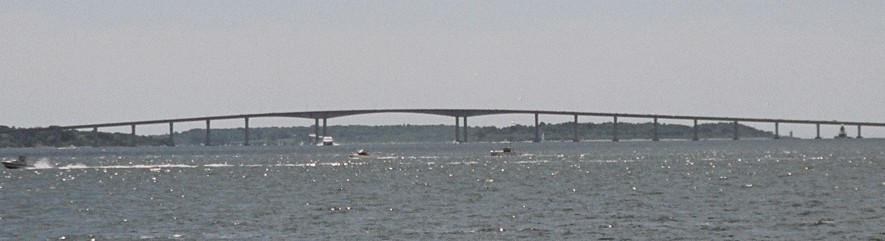
The Jamestown-Verrazano Bridge, constructed in 1992, connects Jamestown with mainland Rhode Island

Jamestown was a bustling summer destination in the early 1900s, and it had nine hotels in 1903. The golden age of large resort hotels was brief, however, in Jamestown and elsewhere, and patronage rapidly declined in the 1920s. The Thorndike Hotel was demolished in 1938. The Gardner House was one of the larger hotels, but it was taken down in 1941 after being idle for several years, and a USO building was built on its site. After the war, the town purchased the building and it is now known as the community center. It was extensively landscaped and remodeled in 2002. The Bay View Hotel closed in the 1960s, the last of the very large hotels. The building was demolished in 1985, and the Bay View Condominiums opened for occupancy four years later. The building exterior was designed to resemble the hotel. The Bay Voyage Hotel is the only survivor of the many hotels that once lined Jamestown's eastern harbor, now operating as a time share resort.

In 1938, a major hurricane caused much property damage and the loss of more than 300 lives in the Narragansett Bay region. It swept away much of the sand from the Mackerel Cove beach, destroyed its popular beach pavilion, and destroyed the West Ferry docks—which actually speeded approvals for a bridge to Saunderstown. The first Jamestown Bridge opened in the summer of 1940, replacing West Ferry service with a continuously available link to the west.

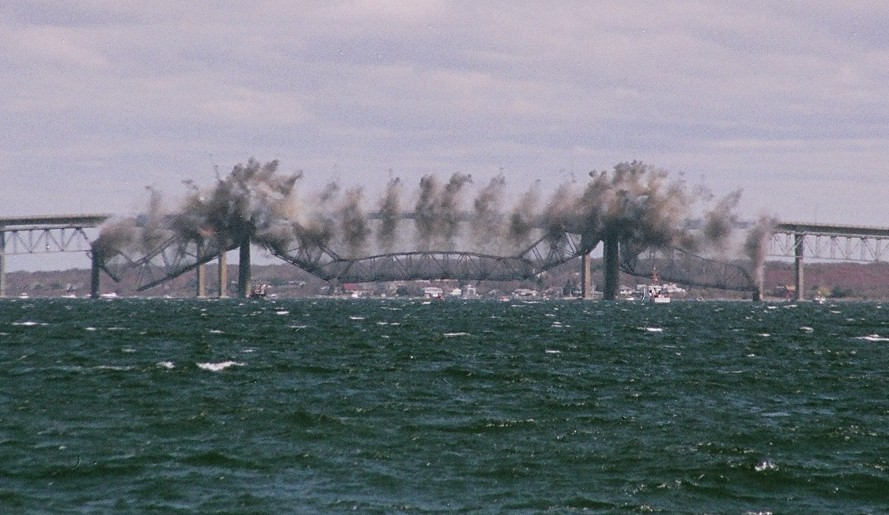
Demolition of the original Jamestown Bridge in 2006

In 1969, the Claiborne Pell Newport Bridge was completed, establishing Route 138 as a continuous highway from South County to Newport. With its completion, traditional ferry service was eliminated. The bridge is pictured on the 2001 Rhode Island state quarter. In 1992, the Jamestown-Verrazano Bridge replaced the narrow steel bridge erected in 1940. It was accompanied by construction of a new western-end access road and a cross-Conanicut Island highway.

== Demographics ==
Historical population
Census	Pop.	Note	%±
1790	507		—
1800	501		−1.2%
1810	504		0.6%
1820	448		−11.1%
1830	415		−7.4%
1840	365		−12.0%
1850	358		−1.9%
1860	400		11.7%
1870	378		−5.5%
1880	459		21.4%
1890	707		54.0%
1900	1,091		54.3%
1910	1,175		7.7%
1920	1,633		39.0%
1930	1,599		−2.1%
1940	1,744		9.1%
1950	2,068		18.6%
1960	2,267		9.6%
1970	2,911		28.4%
1980	4,040		38.8%
1990	4,999		23.7%
2000	5,622		12.5%
2010	5,405		−3.9%
2020	5,559		2.8%
U.S. Decennial Census

According to the 2020 U.S. Census, Jamestown has a population of 5,559, and 2,563 total households in the town. The population density was 588.4 inhabitants per square mile (227.2/km^{2}). There were 3,122 housing units in the town. The racial makeup of the town was 93.47% White, 0.70% African American, 0.13% Indigenous American, 0.77% Asian, 0.52% from some other race, and 4.39% from two or more races. Hispanic or Latino of any race were 2.27% of the population.

The median home price in Jamestown was $641,800, which is higher than most other towns in the region. Homes worth between $1,500,000 to $2,000,000 accounted for 17% of the homes in Jamestown and 17% were worth $2,000,000 or more. The median real estate taxes paid amounted to $4,988.

Private preschool enrollment on Jamestown was 36% of the total school age population. Of the residents, 97% were high school graduates or better and 65% had a bachelor's degree or higher. Those with a professional degree (e.g., law or medicine) made up 5.7% of the town population.

The median household income in Jamestown was $141,442. Over 16% or the residents were self-employed and 71% were employed full time. Households with retirement income accounted for 26.6% of the residents. Single earner households made of 33% of the household in Jamestown. 4.3% of Jamestown's population were below the poverty line, including 2.8% of those 65 years and older.

Jamestown Public Schools encompasses two buildings: Melrose School for elementary students and Lawn School for middle school students. For high school, public school students matriculate to either North Kingstown High School or Narragansett High School.

== In popular culture ==
Portions of several movies have been filmed in and around Jamestown, including Wind; Me, Myself & Irene; American General (PBS); Evening; Dan in Real Life; Moonrise Kingdom; and Irrational Man. The comic strip Wallace the Brave was created and drawn by Jamestown resident Will Henry and set in the fictional Rhode Island town of Snug Harbor, which is loosely based on Jamestown.

== Notable people ==
- Benedict Arnold, Governor; purchased land in Jamestown 1657, great-grandfather of the notorious turncoat Benedict Arnold
- Brenda Bennett, musician and former member of Vanity 6, currently resides in Jamestown
- Charles L. Bevins, architect; lived in Jamestown
- John Biddle (yachting cinematographer) spent his childhood summers here and later moved back to the island, living there until his death
- Eleanor Albert Bliss, bacteriologist; was born in Jamestown
- Caleb Carr (governor), lived in Jamestown and was buried on the island
- John A. Cloud, former United States Ambassador to the Republic of Lithuania, lives here
- Dwight Dickinson, former United States Ambassador to Togo, lived here
- Daniel Fones, leading Rhode Island military commander in King George's War, was born and raised in Jamestown
- Paul Housberg, lives here, a glass artist recognized for his use of fused and kiln formed glass as an architectural medium
- Luke McNamee, four-star admiral and Governor of Guam, lived in Jamestown
- John Mecray, marine painter and co-founder of the Museum of Yachting, lived in Jamestown
- Jonathan M. Nelson, founder of Providence Equity Partners, built a home in Jamestown in 2009
- Peter F. Neronha, the current Rhode Island Attorney General and former United States Attorney for the District of Rhode Island, was born, raised, and currently resides in Jamestown
- Jack Reed, U.S. senator; former state senator
- William Trost Richards, landscape artist; lived and worked on the island from 1881 till death in 1905
- Marla Romash, political consultant and pastry chef, currently resides in Jamestown
- James Taylor, musician; has a summer home in Jamestown
- Russell E. Train, second Administrator of the U.S. Environmental Protection Agency and founding chairman of the World Wildlife Fund, recipient of the Tyler Prize for Environmental Achievement

== National Historic Places and notable sites in Jamestown ==
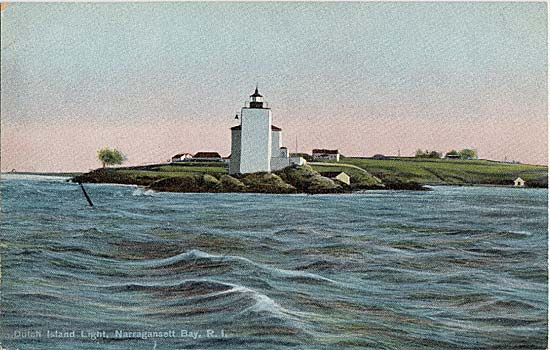
Dutch Island Light

- Artillery Park
- Beavertail Lighthouse
- Thomas Carr Farmstead Site (Keeler Site RI-707)
- Conanicut Battery
- Conanicut Island Lighthouse
- Dutch Island Lighthouse
- Fort Dumpling Site
- Fort Getty
- Friends Meetinghouse (Jamestown, Rhode Island)
- Hazard Farmstead (Joyner Site RI-706)
- Horsehead-Marbella
- Jamestown Archeological District
- Jamestown Windmill
- Old Friends Archeological Site
- Watson Farm
- Windmill Hill Historic District
