= List of museums in Rhode Island =

This list of museums in Rhode Island encompasses museums defined for this context as institutions (including nonprofit organizations, government entities, and private businesses) that collect and care for objects of cultural, artistic, scientific, or historical interest and make their collections or related exhibits available for public viewing. Museums that exist only in cyberspace (i.e., virtual museums) are not included. Defunct museums are listed in a separate section.

== Current ==
Image	Name	Town/City	County	Type	Summary
	Annmary Brown Memorial	Providence	Providence	Art	Part of Brown University, collection includes European and American paintings from the 17th through the 20th centuries and swords
	Artillery Company of Newport	Newport	Newport	Military	Uniforms, weapons, military artifacts and memorabilia
	Audrain Automobile Museum	Newport	Newport	Automobile	Preserves and presents automobile history.
	Barrington Preservation Society	Barrington	Bristol	History - local	Includes household items, brick industry, fishing industry, historical houses.
	Beavertail Lighthouse Museum	Jamestown	Newport	Lighthouse	Located in the assistant keeper's house, includes models of many Rhode Island lighthouses
	Belcourt Castle	Newport	Newport	Historic house	1890s summer cottage estate with furnishings, art and artifacts from 33 European and Oriental countries and 37 other Newport mansions
	Blithewold Mansion, Gardens and Arboretum	Bristol	Bristol	Historic house	45-room English-style manor mansion, 32 acres of gardens & arboretum
	Block Island Historical Society Museum	Block Island	Block Island	History - local	Includes household items, maritime and farming artifacts
	Block Island Southeast Light	Block Island	Block Island	Lighthouse	Open in summer
	Boyd's Wind Grist Mill	Middletown	Newport	Mill	Early 19th-century smock mill, open to the public on Sunday afternoons in July, August and September, operated by the Middletown Historical Society
	The Breakers	Newport	Newport	Historic house	1890s Vanderbilt family mansion
	Bristol Historical and Preservation Society Museum and Library	Bristol	Bristol	Prison	19th century jail and keeper's house
	Bristol Train of Artillery Museum	Bristol	Bristol	Military	Open by appointment only
	Cape Verdean Museum	Pawtucket	Providence	Ethnic	History and culture of Cape Verde and Cape Verdean Americans
	Chateau-sur-Mer	Newport	Newport	Historic house	Gilded Age mansion
	Chepstow	Newport	Newport	Historic house	19th century period mansion
	Clemence-Irons House	Johnston	Providence	Historic house	Operated by Historic New England, late 17th-century house
	Clouds Hill Victorian House Museum	Warwick	Kent	Historic house	Late 19th-century Victorian period house
	Coggeshall Farm Museum	Bristol	Bristol	Living history	Late 18th-century period farm with living history re-enactors
	Culinary Arts Museum	Providence	Providence	Food	Part of Johnson & Wales University, history and culture of food, cooking and cuisine
	David Winton Bell Gallery	Providence	Providence	Art	part of the List Art Center at Brown University
	Eleazer Arnold House	Lincoln	Providence	Historic house	Operated by Historic New England, 17th century period house
	The Elms	Newport	Newport	Historic house	Early 20th-century mansion
	Firemen's Museum	Warren	Bristol	Firefighters	Open by appointment only
	Fort Adams	Newport	Newport	Fort	Tours of historic fort, located in Fort Adams State Park
	General Nathanael Greene Homestead	Coventry	Kent	Historic house	18th century home of Revolutionary War general Nathanael Greene, also known as Spell Hall
	Gilbert Stuart Birthplace	Saunderstown	Washington	Historic house	18th century Colonial house and museum about portraitist Gilbert Stuart
	Governor Henry Lippitt House	Providence	Providence	Historic house	19th century period Victorian 20 room home
	Governor Sprague Mansion	Cranston	Providence	Historic house	Operated by the Cranston Historical Society, mid 19th century period mansion
	Governor Stephen Hopkins House	Providence	Providence	Historic house	Operated by Society of Colonial Dames of America, 18th-century home of Stephen Hopkins
	Great Friends Meeting House	Newport	Newport	Religious	Historic Quaker meeting house, operated by the Newport Historical Society
	Green Animals Topiary Garden	Portsmouth	Newport	Historic house	80 topiary animals and an 1859 Victorian house museum with displays of vintage toys & furnishings
	Haffenreffer Museum of Anthropology	Providence	Providence	Anthropology	Part of Brown University
	Hearthside	Lincoln	Providence	Historic house	Early 19th century stone mansion
	Hera Gallery	Wakefield	Washington	Art	Contemporary art
	Herreshoff Marine Museum	Bristol	Bristol	Maritime	Includes America's Cup Hall of Fame
	Hunter House	Newport	Newport	Historic house	18th century period house
	International Tennis Hall of Fame	Newport	Newport	Sports	Located at the Newport Casino
	Isaac Bell House	Newport	Newport	Historic house	1880s Shingle-Style house
	Jamestown Arts Center	Jamestown	Newport	Art	Art museum and teaching space. Also host to multiple film festivals
	Jamestown Fire Museum	Jamestown	Newport	Firefighting	Operated by the Jamestown Fire Department and volunteers, located next door to the main station
	Jamestown Museum	Jamestown	Newport	Local history	Operated by the Jamestown Historical Society, open seasonally
	John Brown House	Providence	Providence	Historic house	18th century period mansion, operated by the Rhode Island Historical Society
	John Hunt House	East Providence	Providence	Historic house	18th-century house and museum operated by the East Providence Historical Society
	John Waterman Arnold House	Warwick	Kent	Historic house	Late 18th-century house, home of the Warwick Historical Society
	Joy Homestead	Cranston	Providence	Historic house	Operated by the Cranston Historical Society, 18th-century Colonial period house
	Kingscote	Newport	Newport	Historic house	19th-century Gothic Revival house
	Ladd Observatory	Providence	Providence	Science center	Part of Brown University, 1891 historic astronomical observatory.
	Linden Place	Bristol	Bristol	Historic house	19th century estate and gardens
	Marble House	Newport	Newport	Historic house	Gilded Age Vanderbilt family mansion
	Mount Hope Farm	Bristol	Bristol	Historic house	18th century period mansion and farm grounds
	Musée Patamécanique	Bristol	Bristol	Patamechanics	Private museum containing works representing the field of Patamechanics
	Museum of Natural History and Planetarium	Providence	Providence	Natural history	Located in Roger Williams Park
	Museum of Newport History	Newport	Newport	Local history	Operated by the Newport Historical Society
	Museum of Primitive Art and Culture	South Kingstown	Washington	Archaeology / Anthropology	Changing exhibits of archaeological and ethnological objects from around the world, including Native American
	Museum of Work and Culture	Woonsocket	Providence	Industry	Textile industry, operated by the Rhode Island Historical Society
	Museum of Yachting	Newport	Newport	Maritime	Art, photographs and history of yachting, sailing, and boatbuilding
	National Museum of American Illustration	Newport	Newport	Art	American illustrative art, located at Vernon Court, a Gilded Age mansion
	Naval War College Museum	Newport	Newport	Military	History of the Naval War College, area naval activities and science of naval warfare
	Nelson W. Aldrich House	Providence	Providence	Local history	Home of the Rhode Island Historical Society, changing exhibits on Rhode Island history
	New England Wireless and Steam Museum	East Greenwich	Kent	Technology	Includes the Massie Wireless Station PJ station, antique radio equipment, locally manufactured steam engines, steam turbines, and technical artifacts.
	Newport Art Museum	Newport	Newport	Art	Includes notable works from Rhode Island and New England artists, mid-19th century period rooms in the John N. A. Griswold House
	Newport Car Museum	Portsmouth	Newport	Automobile	75+ cars from the 50s through to current models, in six galleries: World Cars, Corvettes, Ford/Shelby, Fin Cars, American Muscle, Mopar
	Newport Colony House	Newport	Newport	History	Meeting place for the Colonial legislature and alternative State House, operated by the Newport Historical Society
	Norman Bird Sanctuary	Middletown	Newport	Natural history	300-acre (1.2 km^{2}) wildlife refuge with trailside museum
	Paine House Museum	Coventry	Kent	Historic house	Colonial period house
	Paradise School	Portsmouth	Newport	School	One room schoolhouse
	Pettaquamscutt Historical Society Museum	Kingston	Washington	Local history	Housed in a former jail building
	Portsmouth Historical Society	Portsmouth	Newport	Local history	Houses the majority of its collection in the former Portsmouth Christian Union Church, includes Julia Ward Howe Room
	Prescott Farm	Middletown	Newport	Mill	Includes windmill, Revolutionary War guard house, and historic gardens
	Providence Children's Museum	Providence	Providence	Children's	
	Redwood Library and Athenaeum	Newport	Newport	Art	Library with changing exhibitions of art and history from its collections, also sculpture, furniture, gardens & special book collections
	Rhode Island Computer Museum	North Kingstown	Washington	Technology	A very large collection of vintage computers, many are operational, and include interactive demonstrations. The RICM recently merged with RIMOSA and offers STEM/STEAM classes.
	Rhode Island Museum of Science and Art (RIMOSA)	Providence	Providence	Science / Art	Hands-on exhibits, experiences, portable outreach programs, and creative resources for multi-generational learners. RIMOSA has recently merged with the Rhode Island Computer Museum
	Rhode Island School of Design Museum	Providence	Providence	Art	Collection includes art from Egypt, Asia, Africa, ancient Greece and Rome, Europe, and the Americas, decorative arts, costumes and textiles
	Rhode Island Radio Museum	North Providence	Providence	Historic Technology	Private Collection of Radio and Wireless Equipment and Parts produced in Rhode Island during the 1920s.
	Roger Williams National Memorial	Providence	Providence	Biographical	Life of Roger Williams, co-founder of the Colony of Rhode Island and Providence Plantations and a champion of the ideal of religious freedom
	Rosecliff	Newport	Newport	Historic house	Gilded Age mansion modeled after the Grand Trianon
	Rough Point	Newport	Newport	Historic house	Estate of Doris Duke, includes large art collection and
	Samuel Whitehorne House	Newport	Newport	Historic house	19th century brick townhouse with examples of Newport and Rhode Island furniture from the late 18th century
	Seabee Museum and Memorial Park	Davisville	Washington	Military	Includes the former U.S. Navy concrete chapel, seven vintage Quonset huts and a Seabee statue
	Slater Mill	Pawtucket	Providence	Industry	Textile mill industry
	Smith-Appleby House	Smithfield	Providence	Historic house	18th century period house
	Smith's Castle	Wickford	Washington	Historic house	Late 17th century period house
	South County Museum	Narragansett	Washington	Living history	Includes farm and agriculture exhibits, Victorian kitchen, general store display, maritime gallery, print shop, carpentry shop, blacksmith shop, one-room schoolhouse, carriage barn, early vehicles
	Sydney L. Wright Museum	Jamestown	Newport	Archaeological	Ancient and Colonial period Narragansett Indian artifacts, European artifacts from the 1600s, photos and maps
	Tomaquag Indian Memorial Museum	Exeter	Washington	Native American	Museum of the Narragansett
	Touro Synagogue	Newport	Newport	Historic site	Colonial-era synagogue
	Varnum House Museum	East Greenwich	Kent	Historic house	1773 house built by James Mitchell Varnum, furnished with period furniture and features many historic artifacts. Owned and operated by the Varnum Continentals.
	Varnum Memorial Armory Military Museum	East Greenwich	Kent	Military	website, operated by the Varnum Continentals in the former Varnum Memorial Armory, includes weaponry, uniforms and artifacts dating from colonial America and through the 20th century
	Wanton-Lyman-Hazard House	Newport	Newport	Historic house	Colonial era period house, operated by the Newport Historical Society
	Warwick Museum of Art	Warwick	Kent	Art	Changing exhibits of fine and decorative art
	Watson Farm	Jamestown	Newport	Historic house	1796 house is not open to the public but visitors can explore the farmland on their own.
	Westerly Armory Museum	Westerly	Washington	Military	Local military memorabilia
	Whitehall Museum House	Middletown	Newport	Historic house	18th century period house
	Wilbor House, Barn and Quaker Meeting House	Little Compton	Newport	Historic house	Operated by the Little Compton Historical Society, late 17th-century house and early 19th-century meeting house

== Defunct ==
- Beechwood (mansion), closed in 2010
- The Doll Museum, Newport, closed in 2005
- Old Colony & Newport Railway, Newport, operates narrated historical tours using 100-year-old passenger equipment, still has its equipment on the track as of 2015 (and 2017).
- Soviet submarine K-77, Providence
- Quonset Air Museum, North Kingstown, closed in 2015

== See also ==
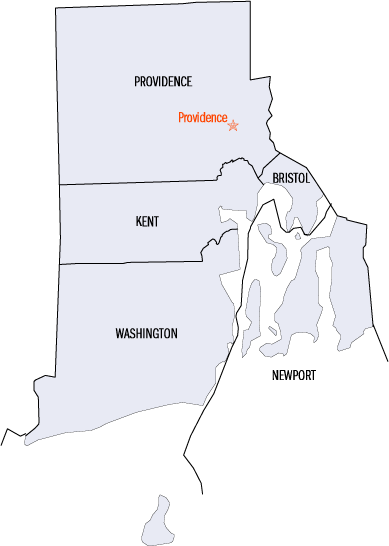
Rhode Island county map

- List of historical societies in Rhode Island
- List of museums
- Nature Centers in Rhode Island
