= Jamestown Archeological District =

Historic district in Rhode Island, United States

- U.S. National Register of Historic Places
- U.S. Historic district
- Location: Jamestown, Rhode Island
- Nearest city: Newport, Rhode Island
- NRHP reference No.: 83004869
- Added to NRHP: December 10, 1989

The Jamestown Archeological District (also known as the Great Creek Archeological District) is an expansive archaeological district which is the site of a major prehistoric Native American settlement in Jamestown, Rhode Island. The full extent of archaeologically-sensitive areas has not been fully identified (as of 2014), but is known to extend from Narragansett Avenue in the south to Rhode Island Route 138 in the north, and from Narragansett Bay in the west to North Road. The district overlaps the historically significant Windmill Hill Historic District, and the nearly 300-acre (120 ha) Watson Farm. The district includes one of largest Native American burying grounds in New England, and includes evidence of occupation dating to 3,000 BC.

The district was added to the National Register of Historic Places in 1989.

== See also ==
- National Register of Historic Places listings in Newport County, Rhode Island
