= Windmill Hill Historic District =

Historic district in Rhode Island, United States

- U.S. National Register of Historic Places
- U.S. Historic district
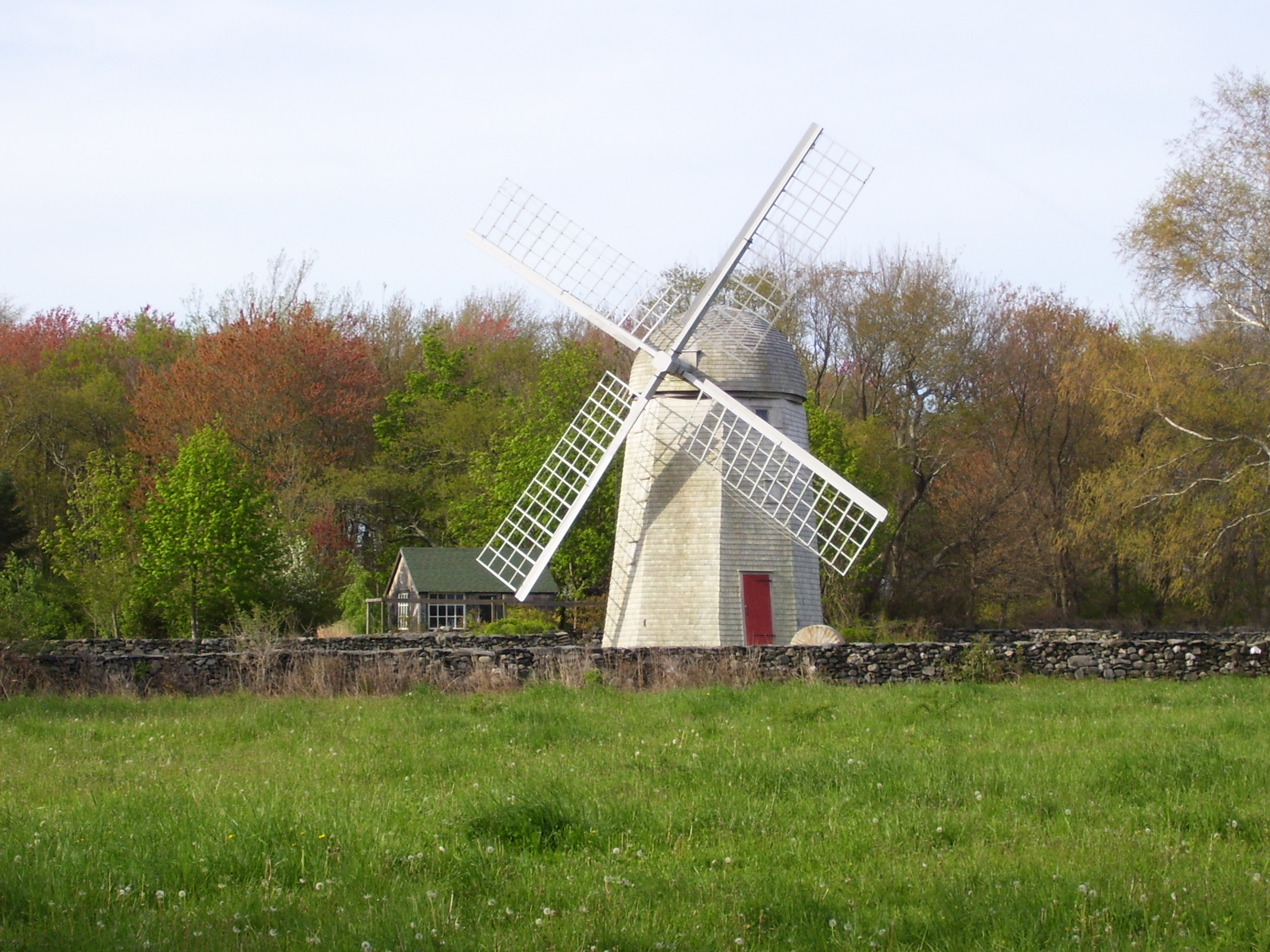

- Location within Rhode Island Location within the United States
- Location: Jamestown, Rhode Island, US
- Coordinates: 41°31′35″N 71°22′59″W
- Architectural style: Mid 19th Century Revival, Late Victorian
- NRHP reference No.: 78000067
- Added to NRHP: October 2, 1978

The Windmill Hill Historic District is a historic district encompassing a large rural landscape in Jamestown, Rhode Island. It is bounded on the north by Eldred Avenue, on the east by East Shore Road, on the south by Great Creek, and on the west by Narragansett Bay. The area's historical resources included six farmsteads, as well as the Quaker Meetinghouse, the Jamestown Windmill, and its associated miller's house and barn. The area is predominantly rolling hills with open pastureland and forest. The district was listed on the National Register of Historic Places in 1978. The area is also rich in prehistoric evidence of Native American occupation, which is the subject of the Jamestown Archeological District listing on the National Register.

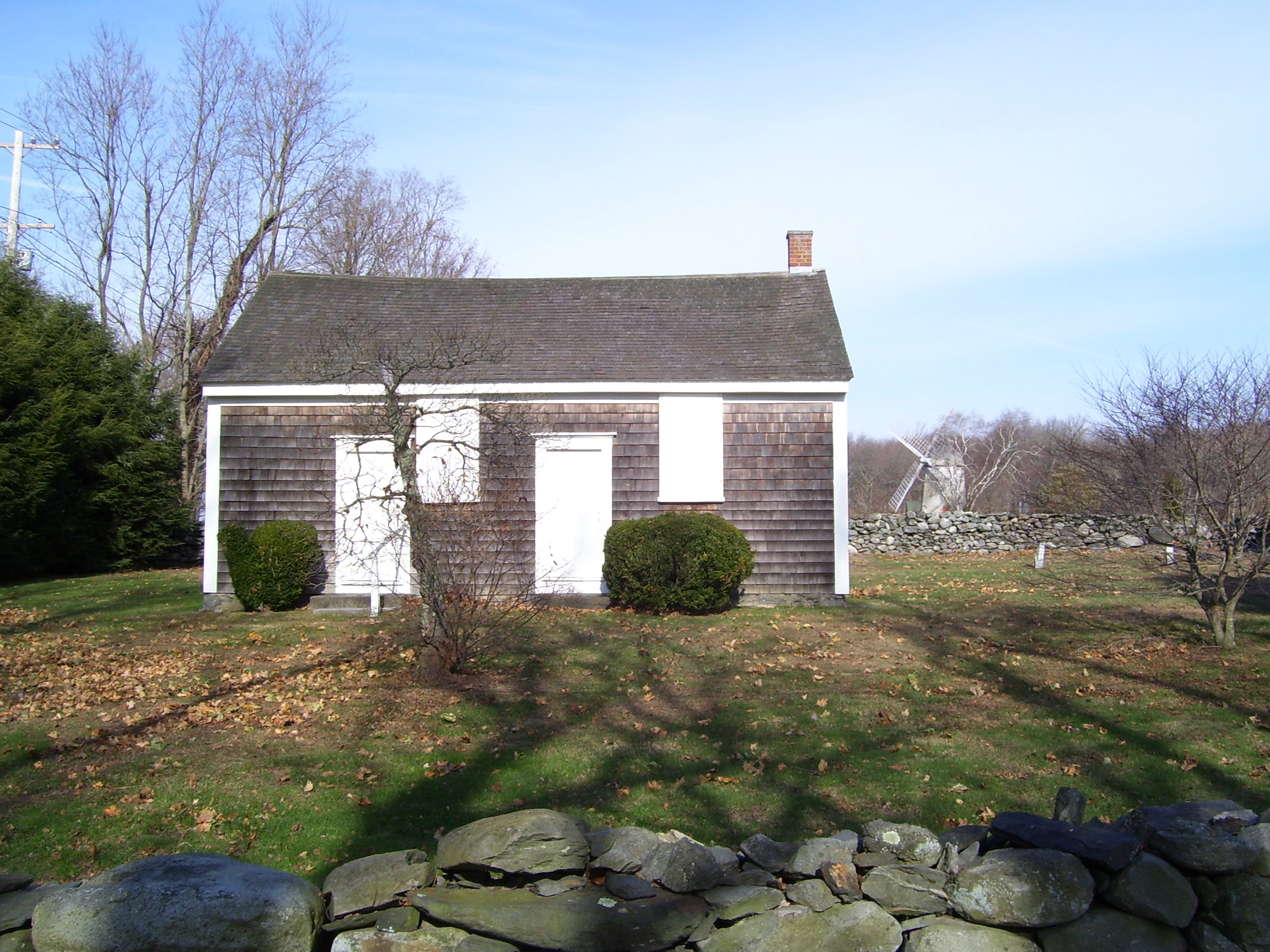
Friends Meeting House with Jamestown Windmill in background

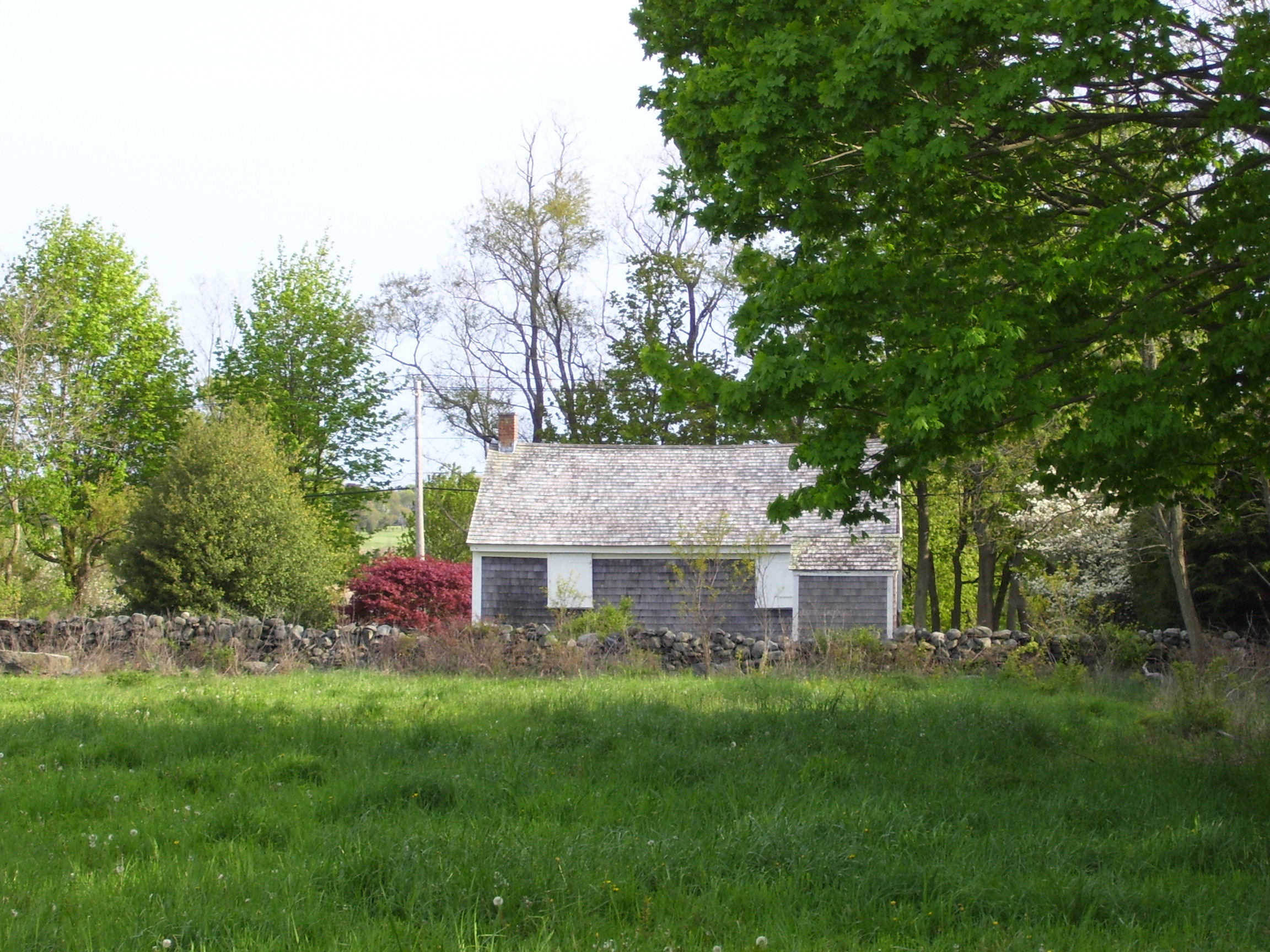
rear view of the Friends Meeting House (Quaker)

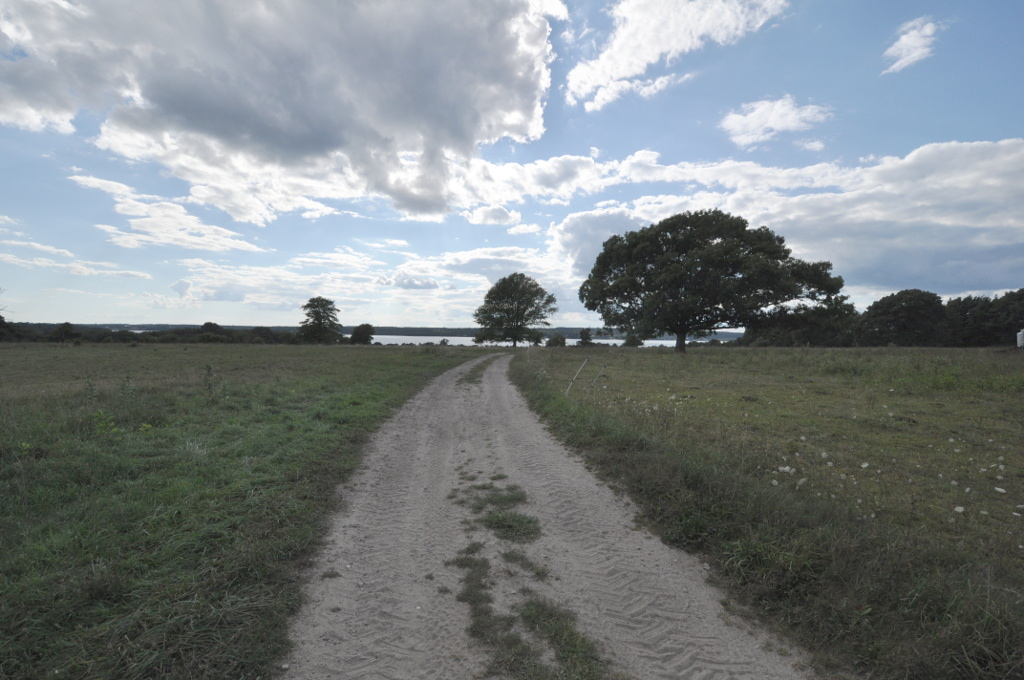
View of Watson Farm down to the shore of Narragansett Bay

== See also ==
- Watson Farm, a museum farm operated by Historic New England located in the district
- National Register of Historic Places listings in Newport County, Rhode Island
