= Block Island Historical Society =

Historical society in Rhode Island, United States

Coordinates: 41°11′20.36″N 71°33′43.90″W

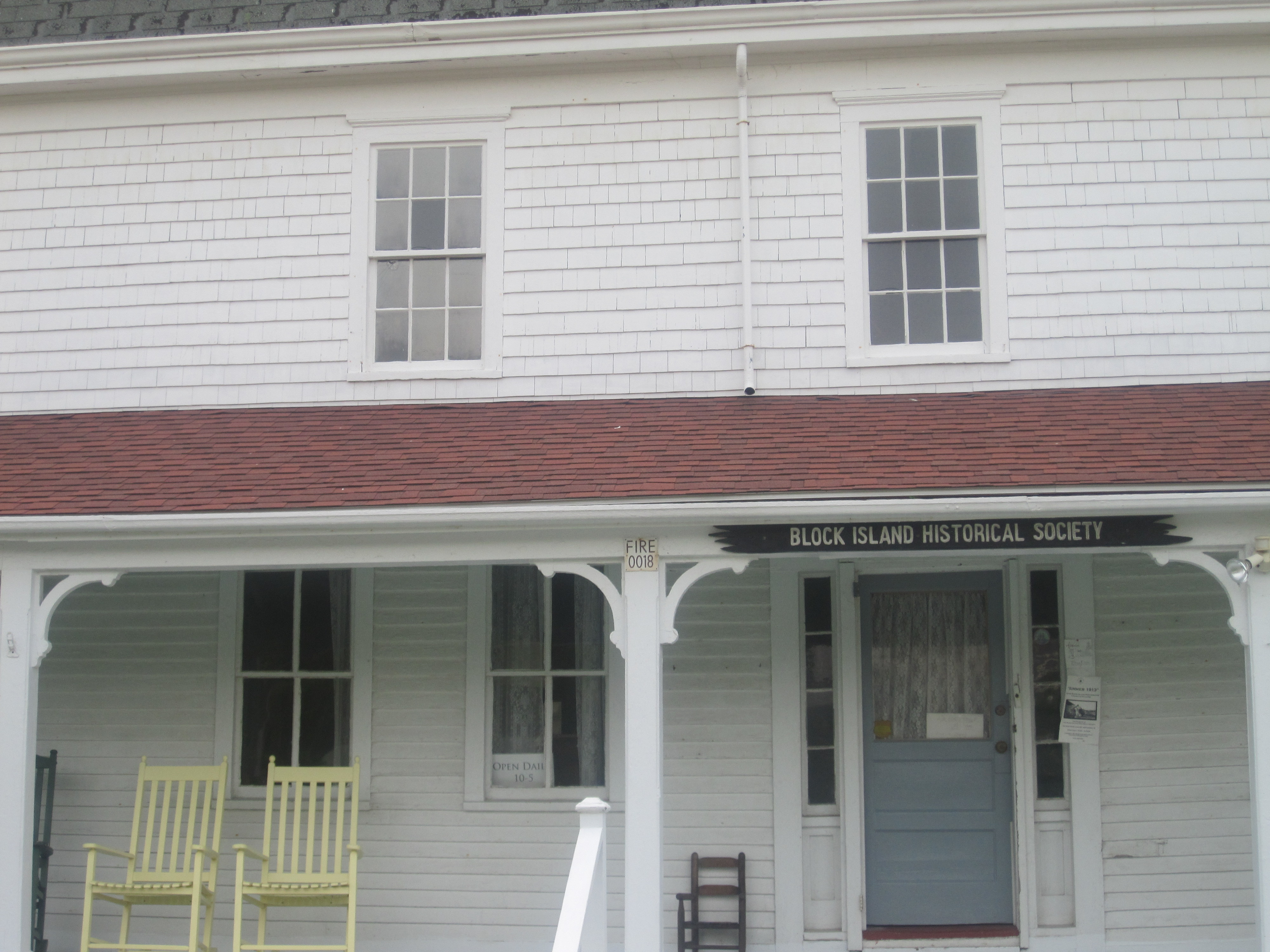
Two-story Block Island Historical Society Museum, located in the former "Woonsocket House," built in 1871

The Block Island Historical Society is a historical society which runs a museum at 18 Old Town Road and Ocean Avenue on Block Island (New Shoreham) in Rhode Island.

The Block Island Historical Society Museum was founded in 1942. The museum is located within Woonsocket House, a large house built in 1871. It was purchased in 1945, and numerous artifacts related to Block Island's history from "early maritime and farming displays to colonial memorabilia and scenes from Victorian summer past times. Two floors of exhibit rooms include fine furniture, textiles, quilts, boat models, tools, fishing gear, Native American artifacts, oral history tapes and other interesting displays." The museum is open daily during the summer and by appointment during the remainder of the year.

== See also ==
- List of historical societies in Rhode Island
- List of museums in Rhode Island
