= Friends Meetinghouse (Jamestown, Rhode Island) =

Historic building in Rhode Island, United States

- U.S. National Register of Historic Places
- U.S. Historic district – Contributing property
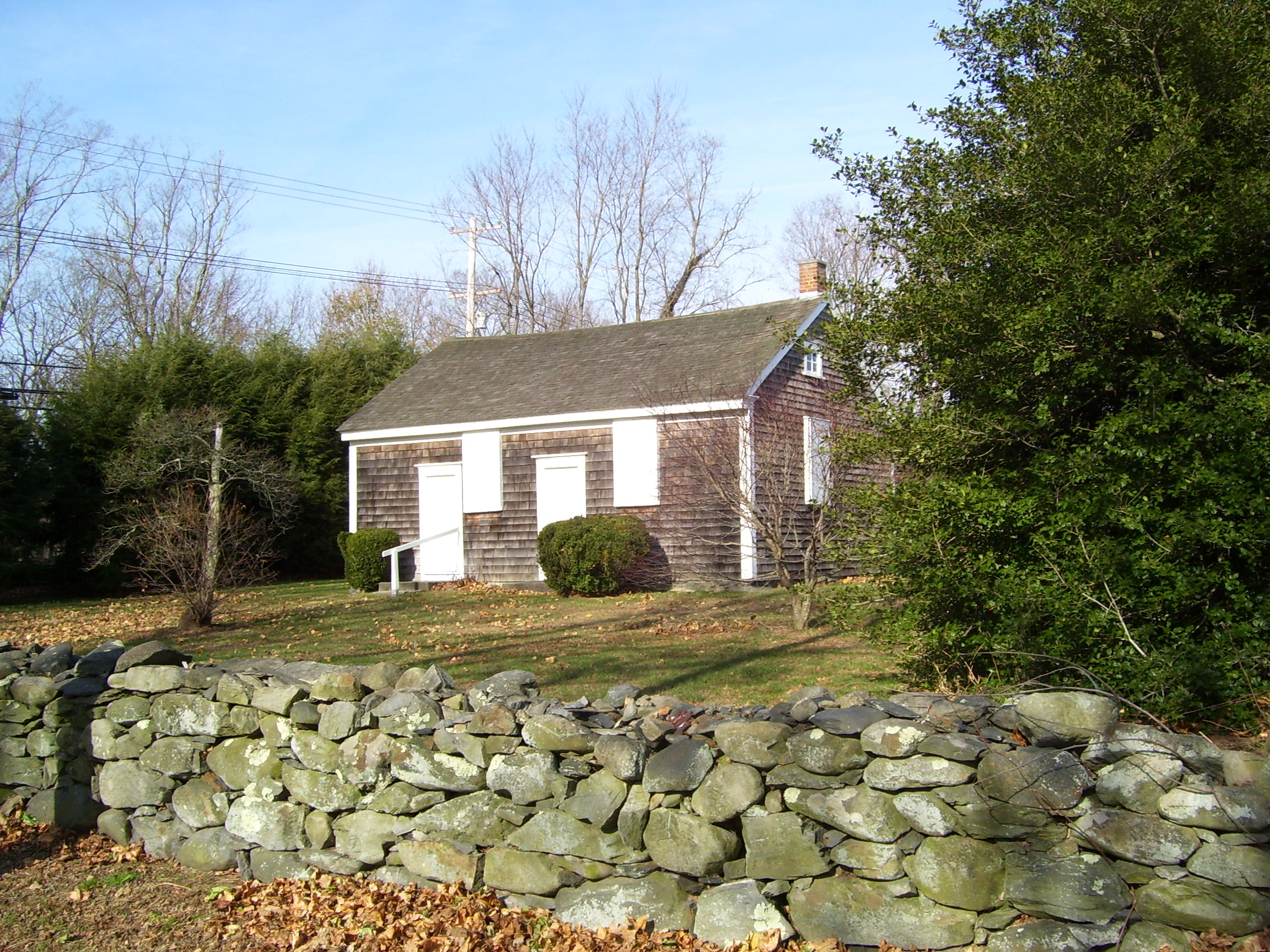
- Conanicut Friends Meeting House

- Location within Rhode Island Location within the United States
- Location: Jamestown, Rhode Island
- Coordinates: 41°30′52″N 71°22′31″W
- Built: 1786
- Part of: Windmill Hill Historic District (ID73000276)
- NRHP reference No.: 73000276

Significant dates
- Added to NRHP: March 7, 1973
- Designated CP: October 2, 1978

The Conanicut Friends Meetinghouse is a historic Quaker meeting house at the junction of North Road and Weeden Lane in Jamestown, Rhode Island.

The structure was built in 1786 to replace the original meeting house destroyed by the British after they occupied Conanicut Island in 1776. The building was added to the National Register of Historic Places in 1973, and is included in the Windmill Hill Historic District. It is still used for religious services during the summer. It contains the Old Friends' Burial Ground.

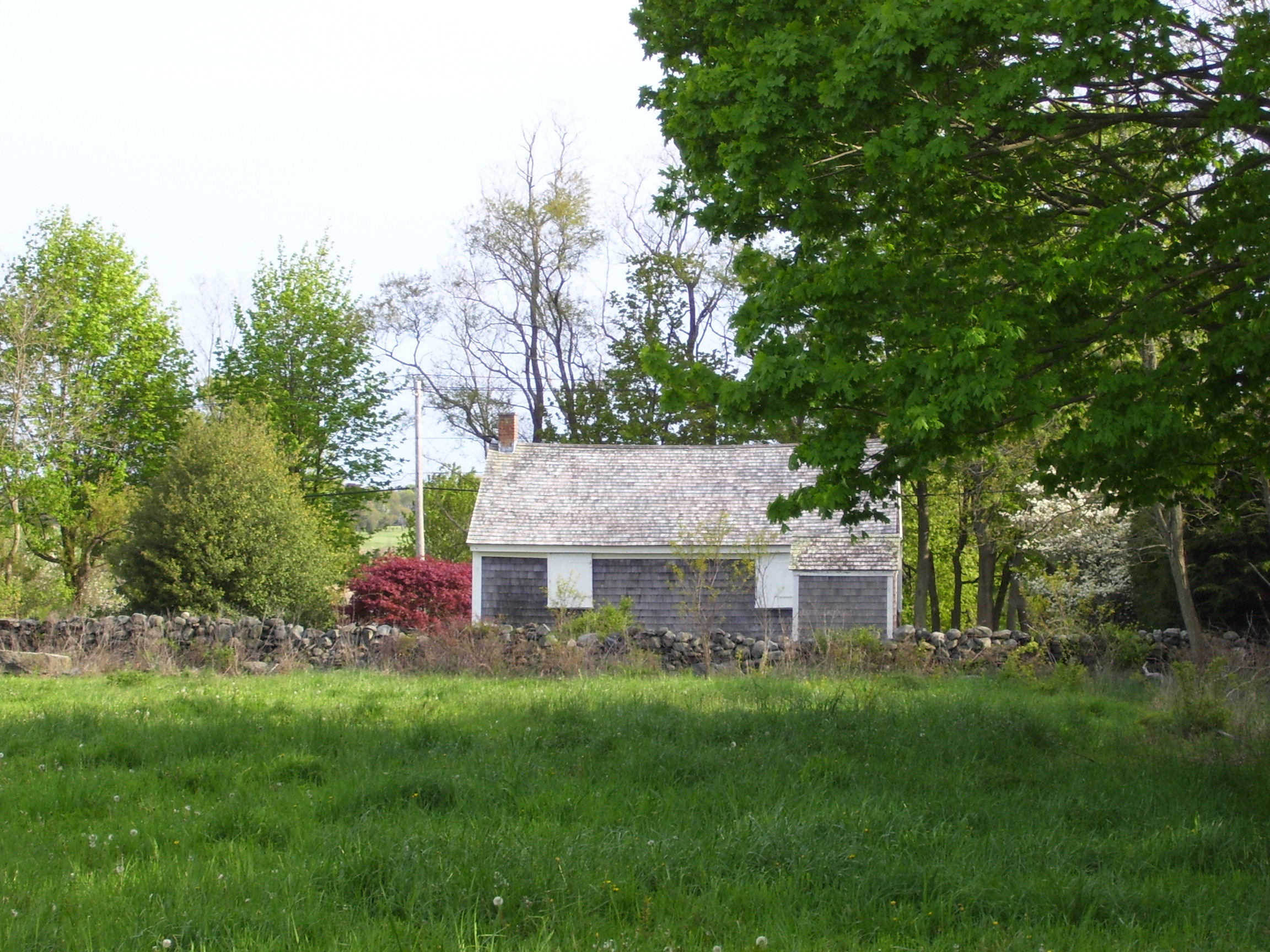
Rear view of the Friends Meeting House

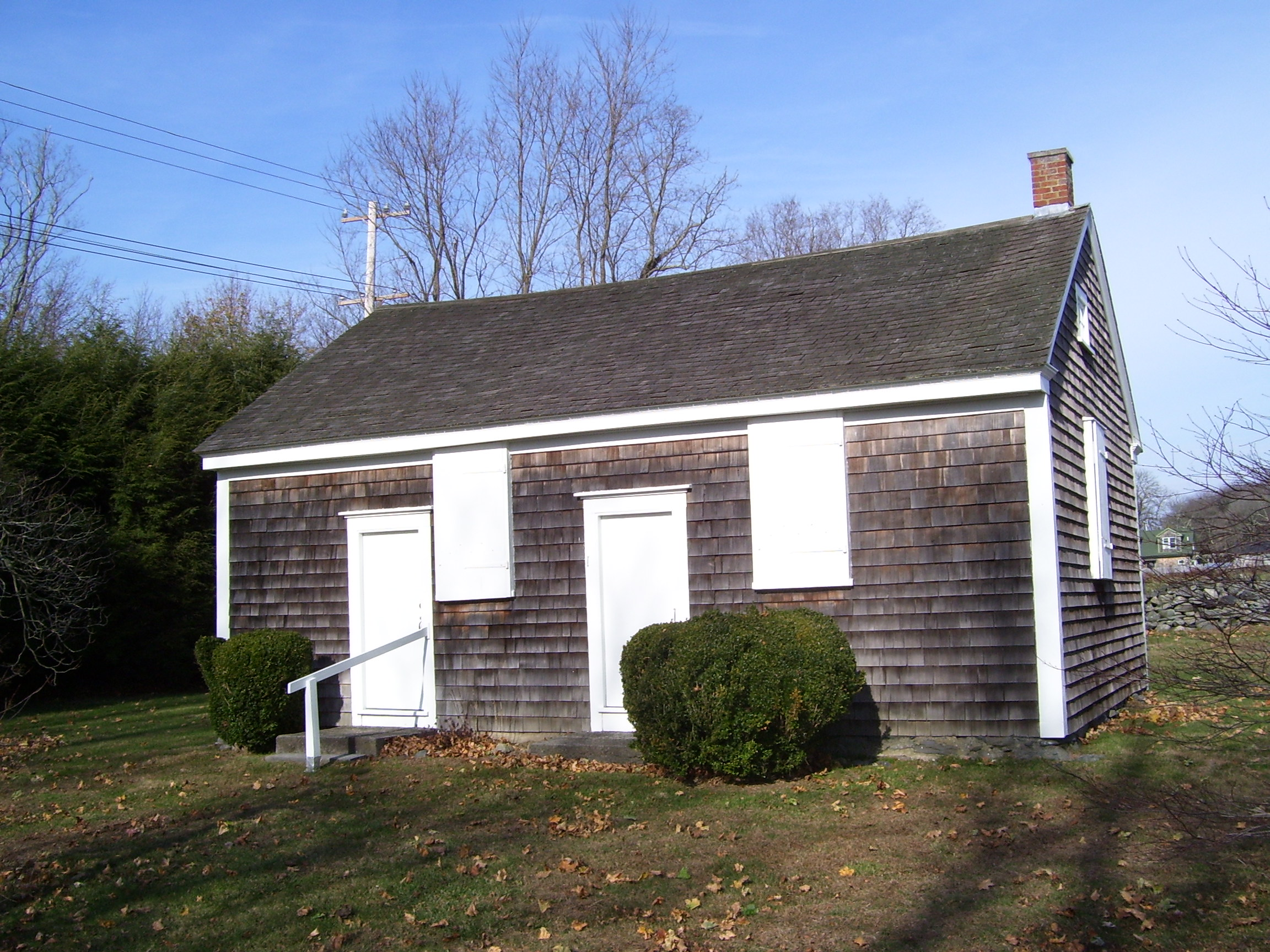
Front view of the Friends Meeting House

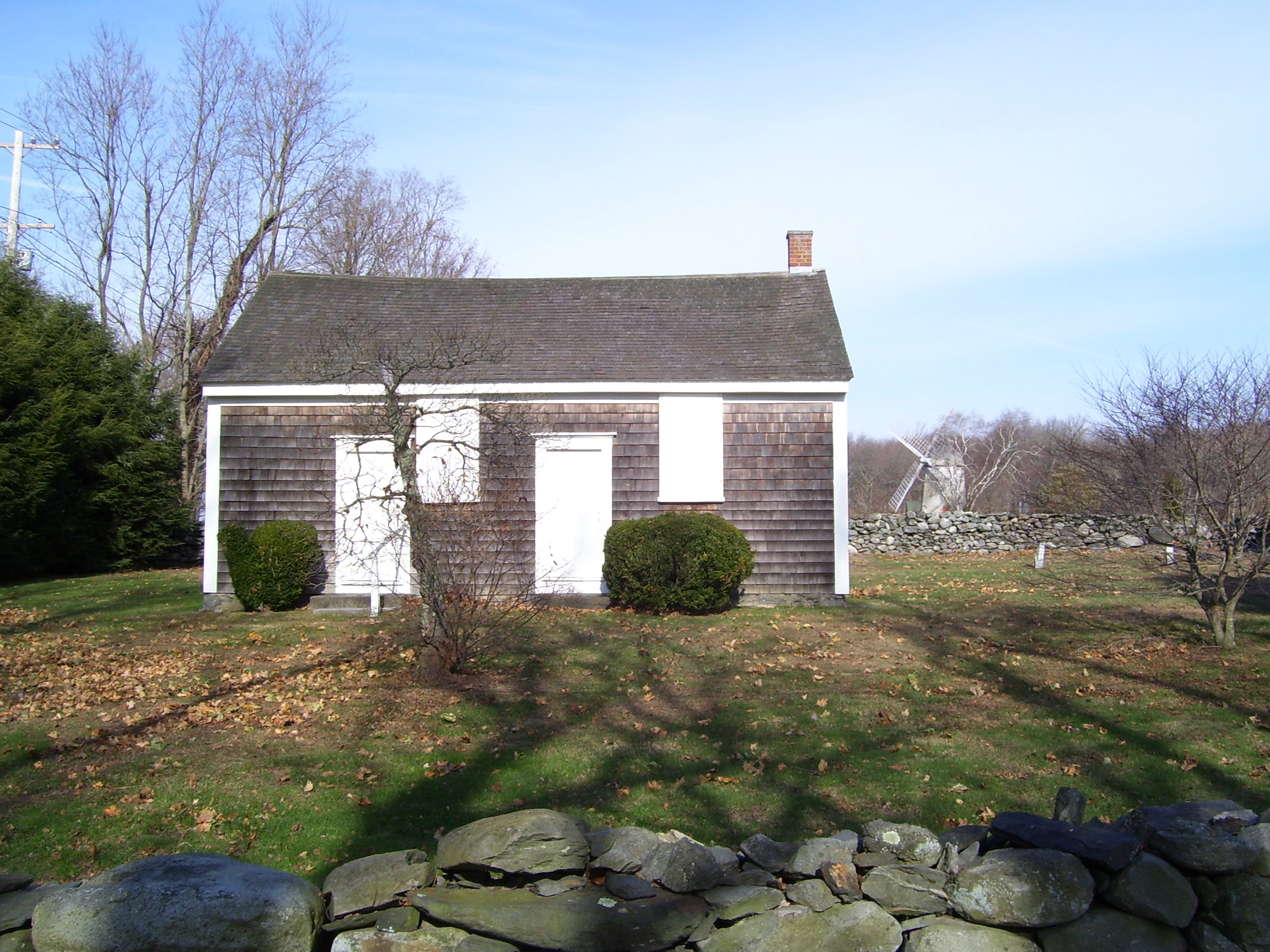
Front view of Friends Meeting House with Jamestown Windmill in background

== See also ==
- National Register of Historic Places listings in Newport County, Rhode Island
