= Jamestown Windmill =

- U.S. National Register of Historic Places
- U.S. Historic district – Contributing property
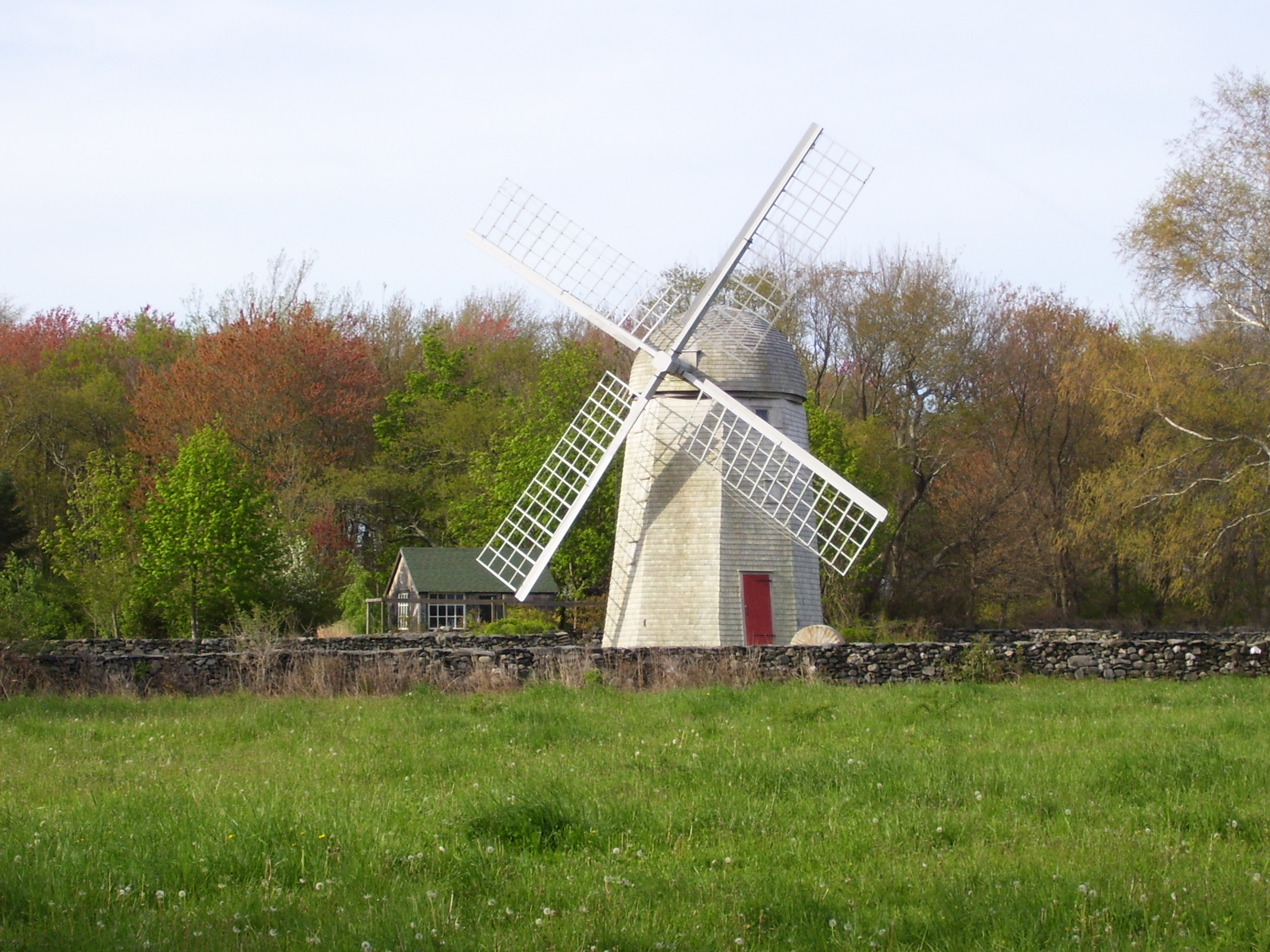

- Location within Rhode Island Location within the United States
- Location: Jamestown, Rhode Island
- Coordinates: 41°30′59″N 71°22′28″W
- Built: 1787
- Part of: Windmill Hill Historic District (ID73000276)
- NRHP reference No.: 73000057

Significant dates
- Added to NRHP: March 14, 1973
- Designated CP: October 2, 1978

The Jamestown Windmill is a smock mill in Jamestown, Rhode Island within the Windmill Hill Historic District on North Road north of Weeden Lane.

The 30-foot (9.1 m) high windmill was built in 1787 to coarse grind flint corn to feed to animals and finer corn meal for farmer families to eat. It was built after the British occupational forces destroyed the previous mill around the time of the Battle of Rhode Island on a half acre of Col. Joseph Wanton's farm, which was confiscated because he was a tory. It operated until 1896. Several renovations were done in the 20th century, and it is maintained by the Jamestown Historical Society. It was added to the National Register of Historic Places in 1973.

== Images ==
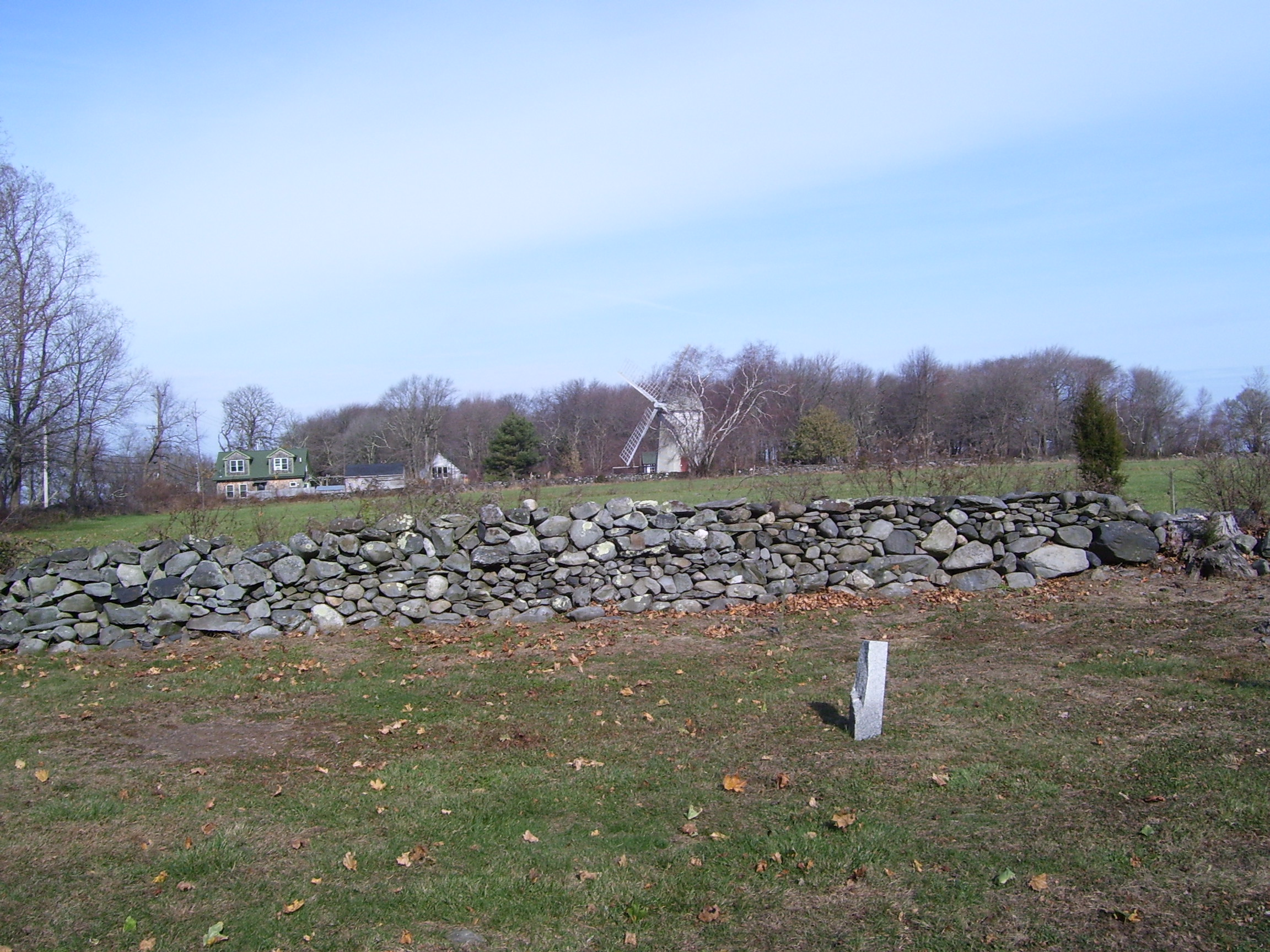
Windmill viewed from the grounds of the Friends Meeting House (Jamestown, Rhode Island)

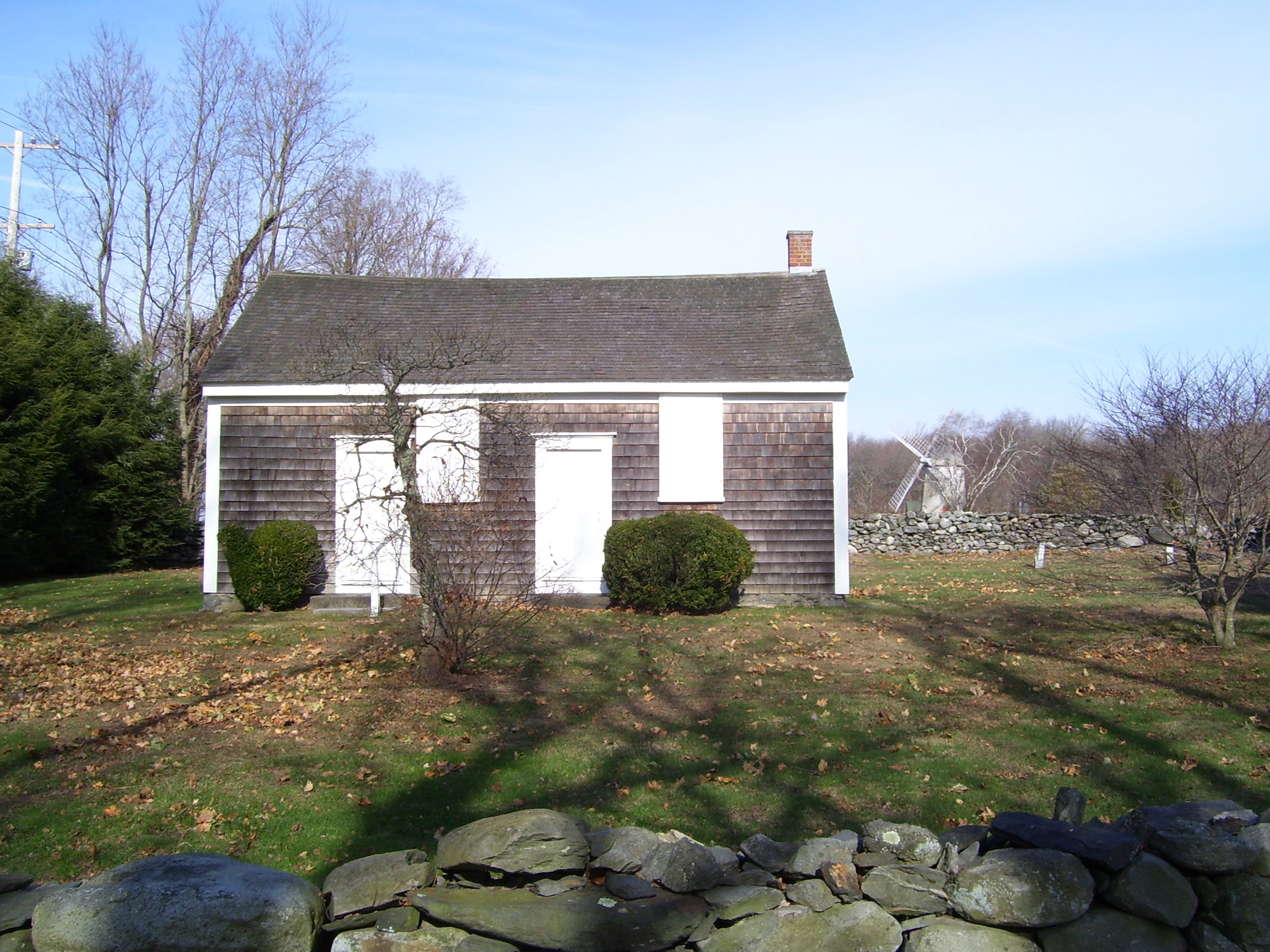
Friends Meeting House (Jamestown, Rhode Island) with Jamestown Windmill in background

== See also ==
- Jamestown Museum: Also part of the Jamestown Historical Society
- National Register of Historic Places listings in Newport County, Rhode Island

== References and external links ==
- Jamestown tourism information - including hours of the mill
- "Historic and Architectural Resources of Jamestown, Rhode Island," (Rhode Island Historical Preservation & Heritage Commission)
