= Varnum Continentals =

Ceremonial militia in Rhode Island, US

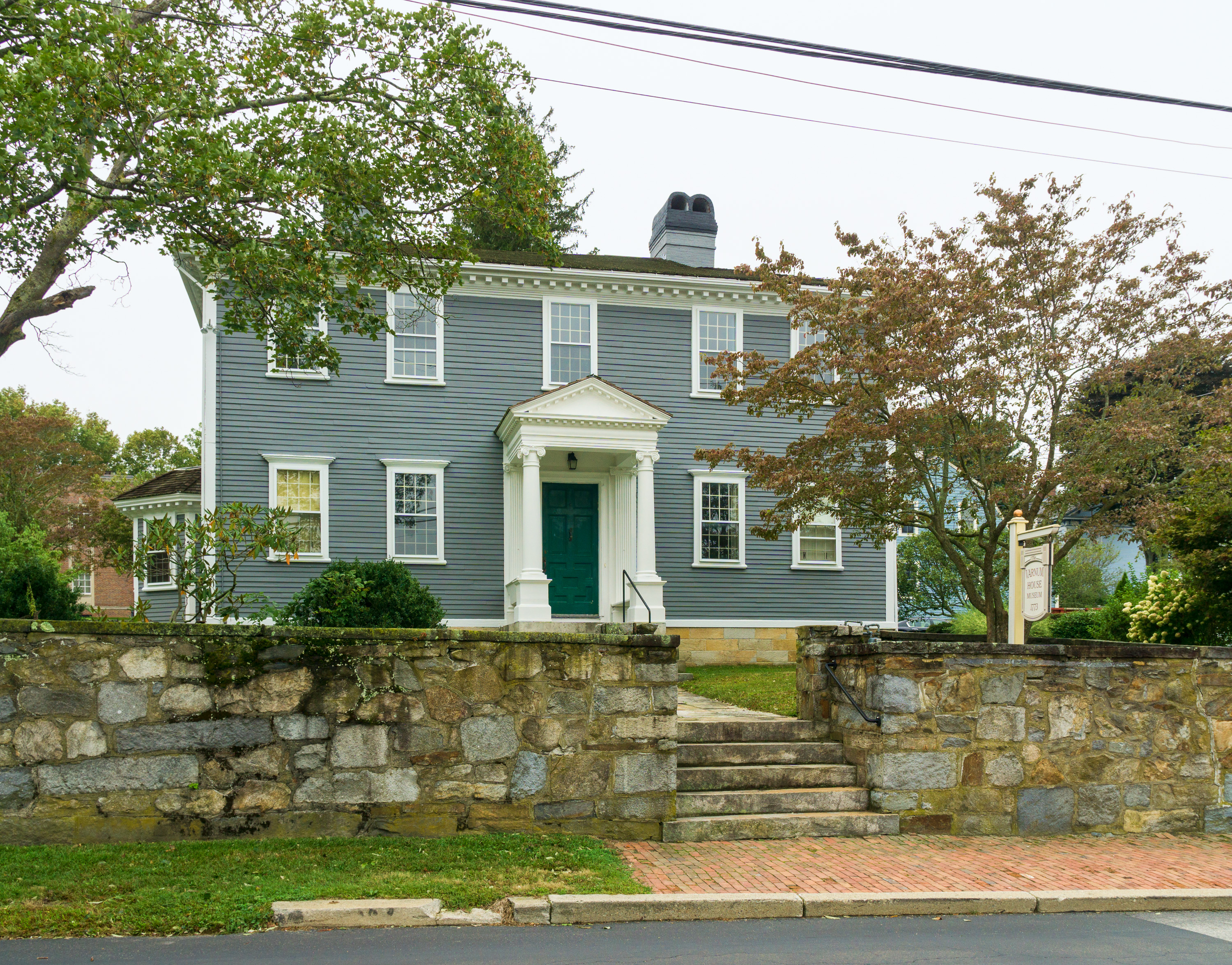
The Varnum Continentals operate the Gen. James Mitchell Varnum House

The Varnum Continentals are an active independent military organization of the Rhode Island militia that was founded in 1903 and currently serve primarily as a ceremonial honor guard and as historic educational organization in East Greenwich, Rhode Island. The Warren Varnum Continentals operate the historic Varnum Memorial Armory, an armory museum at 6 Main Street in East Greenwich, which was built in 1913, and housed Rhode Island State and National Guard units from 1918 to 1996. The Varnum Continentals were named after Revolutionary War General James Mitchell Varnum, a founder of the Kentish Guards, and the Continentals are dedicated to preserving Varnum's memory.

The Varnum Continentals were chartered in 1907 by a group of former Kentish Guards members to preserve the older traditions of the group, and the Continentals were reactivated in 1992 by Governor Bruce Sundlun. The Varnum Continentals still remain part of the Rhode Island militia but serve a largely ceremonial role and educational role using period muskets and cannon for special events and maintain a large museum.
