= South County Museum =

Rhode Island museum

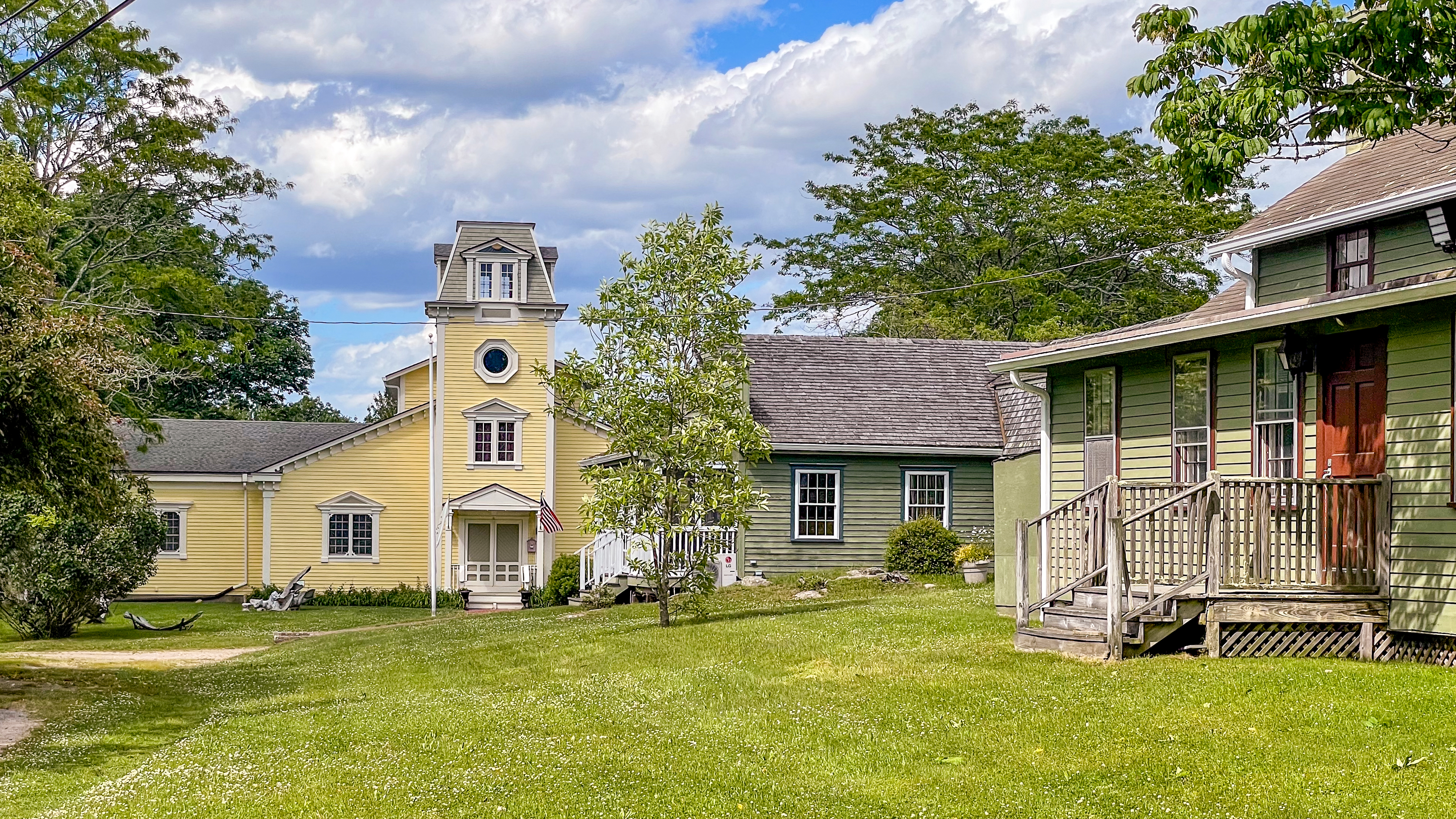
- Established: 1933
- Location: Narragansett, Rhode Island, United States
- Coordinates: 41.43895°N 71.46059°W
- Type: Living history
- Website: South County Museum

The South County Museum is a non-profit museum in Narragansett, Rhode Island.

== History ==
South County Museum was founded in 1933 in North Kingstown and the original collections were held in a barn in Wickford. After a year, the museum moved to the Knight Farm on Scrabbletown Road in North Kingstown.

In 1984, the museum moved to its current location on Canonchet Farm in Narragansett, which was previously owned by Col. William Sprague, a former governor of Rhode Island.

The South County Museum contains artifacts dating from the 17th century to modern times.

== See also ==
- List of museums in Rhode Island
