= Musée Patamécanique =

Coordinates: 41.669546°N 71.276185°W

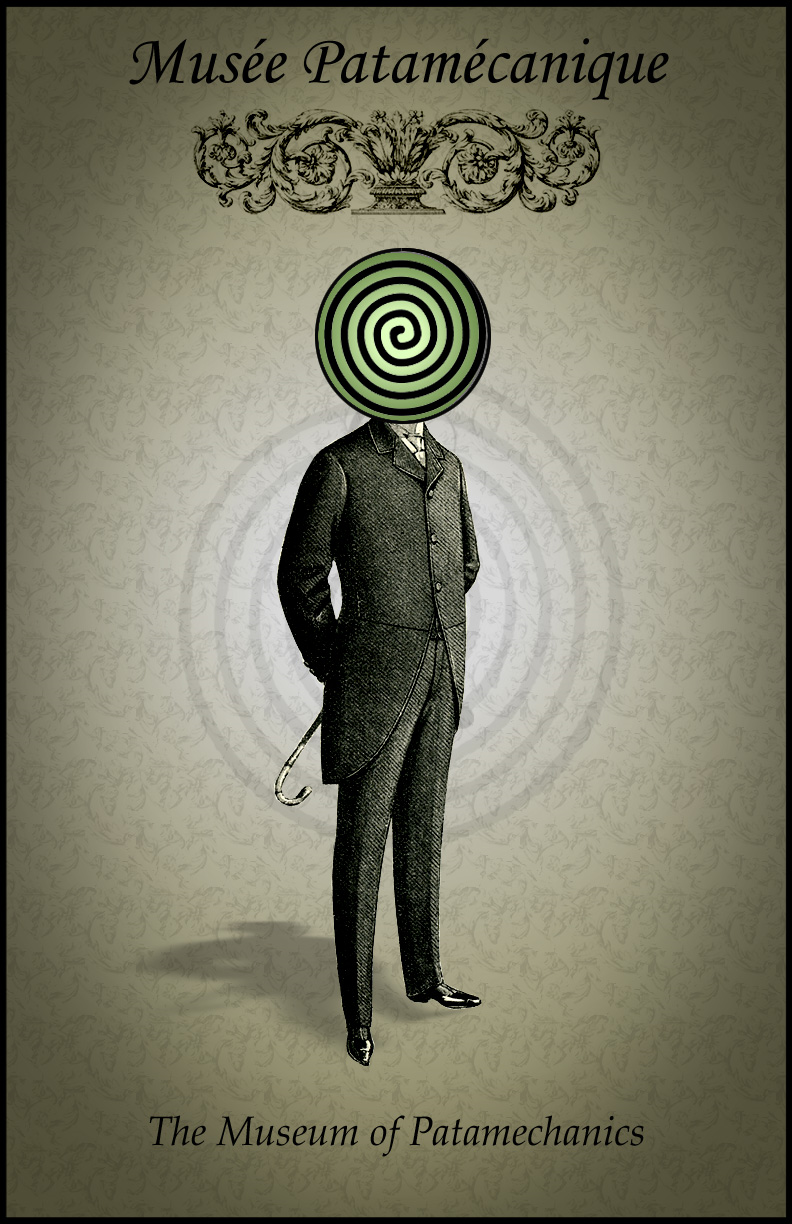
- Established: 2002; 24 years ago
- Dissolved: December 31, 2019
- Location: Bristol, Rhode Island
- Type: Art museum, Cabinet of curiosities
- Founder: David Bertman
- Website: patamecanique.org

Musée Patamécanique is a private museum located in the Historical District of Bristol, Rhode Island, founded in 2006 by Neil Barden Salley. It is open by appointment only to friends, colleagues, and occasionally to outside observers. It is presented as a hybrid of an automaton theater and a cabinet of curiosities, containing works representing the field of Patamechanics, an artistic practice chiefly inspired by Pataphysics.

== History ==
Musée Patamécanique was founded by creative artist, inventor and filmmaker Neil Barden Salley in 2006. During his time at the Rhode Island School of Design earning his master's degree, Salley began to create performances and mechanical sculptures that eventually became prototypes he used at the museum. The museum originally opened as an exhibition in a barn behind Linden Place, a historic house museum designed by Russell Warren in 1810. In 2009, the exhibit closed to make way for a ground-up restoration of the barn that later became occupied by the Bristol Art Museum. Work on an expanded Musée Patamécanique began in 2009 with work being completed in 2013. The museum reopened for tours on April 1, 2014, under the curatorial direction of Daren Elsa NiBelly.

Musée Patamécanique translates from the French to "The museum of Patamechanics." The term Patamechanics was coined by Salley during his time at the Rhode Island School of Design and is derived from the term Pataphysics. According to its website, the term Patamechanics is "... primarily concerned with the behavior of physical bodies when subjected to conscious ’Pataphysical forces or displacements and the subsequent effects of these bodies on their environment."

== Exhibits ==
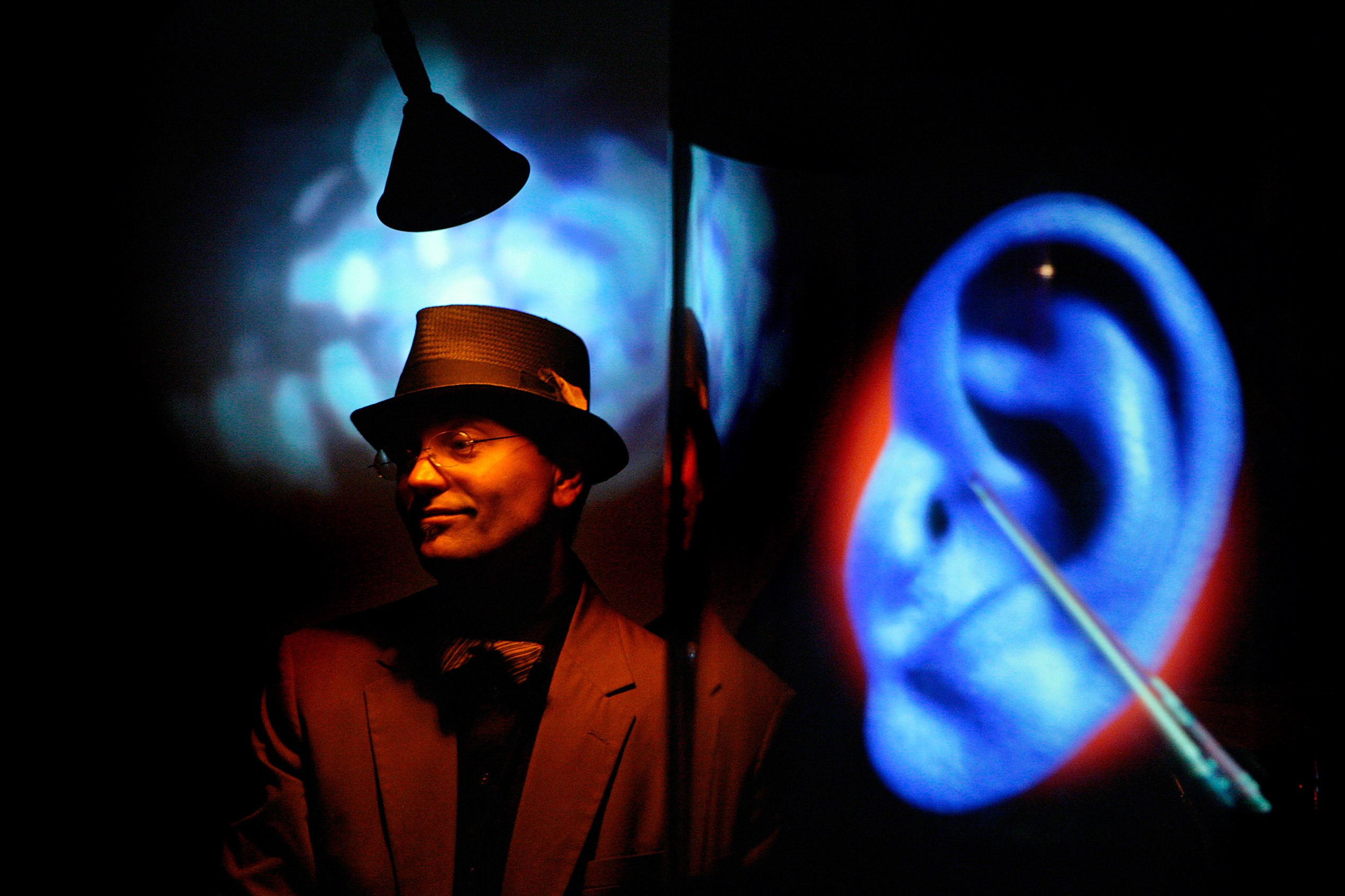
Neil Salley standing in front of Earolin inside of Musée Patamécanique museum.

Much of the material in Musée Patamécanique has clear ties to Dada and Theater of the Absurd. It also references postmodern literature, novelty architecture, theories of memory, identity, automata and mimesis, perception, and Pataphysics. The new version of the museum encompasses tours of both outdoor and indoor exhibition environments, all within a six-block area in the center of downtown Bristol. The exhibition begins with a walking tour in the form of a soundwalk that begins at sunset, which leads patrons to the indoor exhibit's "secret" location: a building named Patamechanics Hall, built by Salley and an example of novelty architecture.

Musée Patamécanique includes artistic, pseudoscientific, pre-cinematic and unclassified exhibits, many of which are displayed in Patamechanics Hall, a walk-in cabinet of curiosity. Examples include a troop of singing animatronic chipmunks (a collaboration with Salley's father); a "time machine", which the museum claims to be the world's largest automated phenakistascope; an olfactory clock; a chandelier of singing animatronic nightingales; an Undigestulator (a device that purportedly reconstitutes digested foods); The Earolin, a 24-inch tall holographic ear that plays the violin; and a machine for capturing the dreams of bumblebees.

== Critical reception ==
Reception was generally positive for the initial production of Musée Patamécanique. The Boston Globe’s Greg Cook described it as “an intellectual hall of mirrors.... a museum for questioning museums, and art, and science, and officialdom, and facts, and the world.” Gwendolyn Holbrow of Art New England wrote that "the Musee stimulates the five traditional senses plus several more: the sense of proprioception, the sense of wonder, and the sense of fun.”

== See also ==
- List of museums in Rhode Island
- Rhode Island School of Design Museum
- Museum of Jurassic Technology
