= List of historical societies in Rhode Island =

The following is a list of historical societies in the state of Rhode Island, United States.

== Organizations ==
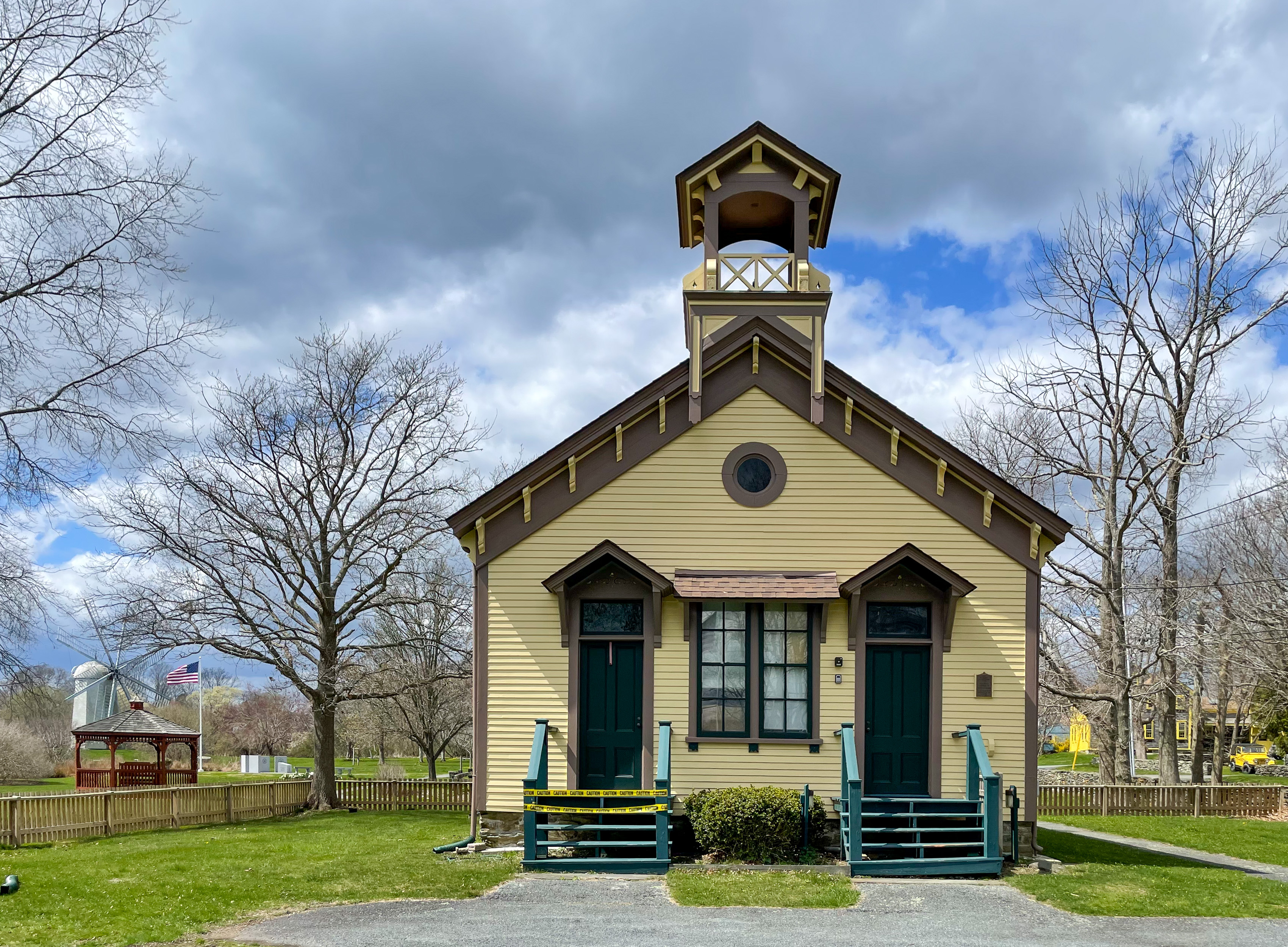
Paradise School building, owned by the Middletown Historical Society, Rhode Island (photo 2022)

- Armenian Historical Association of Rhode Island
- Barrington Historic Antiquarian Society
- Blackstone Valley Historical Society
- Block Island Historical Society
- Bristol Historical and Preservation Society
- Burrillville Historical & Preservation Society
- Charlestown Historical Society
- Coventry Historical Society
- Cranston Historical Society
- Cuttyhunk Historical Society
- East Providence Historical Society
- Exeter Historical Association
- Historical Society of Smithfield
- Hope Historical Society
- Hopkinton Historical Association
- Italian American Historical Society of Rhode Island
- Jamestown Historical Society
- Johnston Historical Society
- Massasoit Historical Association
- Middletown Historical Society
- Mile of History Association
- Narragansett Historical Society
- Newport Historical Society
- Preservation Society of Newport County
- North Stonington Historical Society
- Pawtuxet Valley Preservation and Historical Society
- Portsmouth Historical Society
- Prudence Island Historical and Preservation Society
- Quonochontaug Historical Society
- Rhode Island Historical Society
- Rhode Island Jewish Historical Association
- Rhode Island Labor History Society
- Rhode Island Soldiers and Sailors Historical Society
- Richmond Historical Society
- South County History Center
- Steamship Historical Society of America
- Tiverton Historical Society
- Warwick Historical Society
- Westerly Historical Society
- Western Rhode Island Civic Historical Society
- Willow Dell Historical Association
- Woonsocket Historical and Preservation Society

== See also ==
- History of Rhode Island
- List of museums in Rhode Island
- National Register of Historic Places listings in Rhode Island
- List of historical societies in the United States
