= Steamship Historical Society of America =

- Formation: 1935
- Type: Historical Society
- Headquarters: 2500 Post Road; Warwick, Rhode Island 02886
- Website: SSHSA Web Site

The Steamship Historical Society of America (SSHSA) is a non-profit organization that was founded in 1935 as a means of bringing together amateur and professional maritime historians in the waning years of steamboat services in the northeastern United States. The interests of SSHSA have since expanded to encompass engine-powered vessels throughout North America and worldwide, both inland and deep sea. SSHSA was incorporated in the Commonwealth of Virginia in 1950 and is currently headquartered in Warwick, Rhode Island, United States.

SSHSA's quarterly illustrated journal, Steamboat Bill, has been published continuously since 1940 and is the oldest publication in its field. In the 2010, the historical society updated their magazine's lay-out and title to better encompass their mission and content, renaming the publication PowerShips. It publishes original, authoritative articles about steamships and other vessels past and present. Also included are regional and international reports about present vessels, shipping, and cruising. Reviews of the latest and best maritime books are featured as well. SSHSA also publishes books and allied material on the history of engine-powered vessels.

Membership activities include two national meetings each year in the United States and Canada where maritime activity has been important, including trips on active historic vessels when possible. Special cruise opportunities are also offered on both inland and ocean waters. Several local chapters are active around the United States which hold meetings, programs, and outings for their members.

== See also ==
- Maritime history of the United States
- List of historical societies in Rhode Island
