= Rhode Island Computer Museum =

Computer museum in North Kingstown, Rhode Island, US

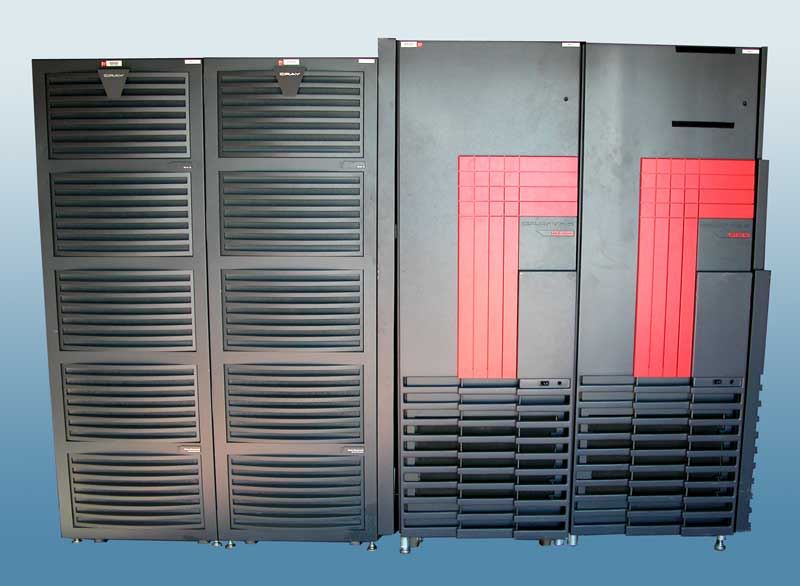
- A CRAY supercomputer from the RICM collection
- Established: 1999
- Location: North Kingstown, Rhode Island
- Coordinates: 41°41′40.1028″N 71°29′58.9338″W
- Type: Computer museum
- Website: www.ricomputermuseum.org

The Rhode Island Computer Museum (RICM) is a vintage computer museum located in North Kingstown, Rhode Island, United States. The museum's Learning Lab and display space are located at 1051 Ten Rod Rd, North Kingstown, Rhode Island. The museum's warehouse is in Bldg 310 Compass Circle, Suite C, North Kingstown. With technology’s rapid transformation, the rich history of the development of computers and digital technology can easily get lost, and the museum aims to preserve this history to inspire young people with an interest in technology.

The official purpose of the museum is "procuring and preserving whatever relates to computer science and its history, disseminating knowledge, and encouraging research in computer science by means of visits, lectures, discussions, and publications".

== History ==
The museum began in 1996 with a core group, all of whom had been members of a British sports car club. Talking among themselves, the eventual founders of the museum decided that a former computer museum in Boston was failing to inform and inspire future generations about the origins of the computer.

The museum was formally established as a 501(c)(3) nonprofit in 1999.

In 2015, the museum also started leasing space in the Meadows Professional Office Complex to offer a more interactive experience, including classes for the community and students. A few years later that space was moved to 1755 Bald Hill Road, Warwick, Rhode Island. Then, in 2025, they moved again to 1051 Ten Rod Rd, North Kingstown, Rhode Island.

== Collection ==
The museum occupies 5,000 square feet of warehouse space housing software and hardware spanning decades, books, computers, printers, floppy disks, hard drives, and many other electronic items. People from around the country have made donations to the collection. The museum also sometimes refurbishes computers and other hardware and donated it to people in the community who otherwise could not afford these items.

On display are a number of personal microcomputers from the United States and UK, and mainframe computers (e.g. DEC VAXes, Wang 2200-VP, DEC PDP-8, -9, -10, -11, -12, etc.). The collection also includes examples of Sequent multi-processor machines, a Data General Eclipse from the Harvard Cyclotron Laboratory, one of two surviving Astronautics, and a large selection of Wang VS machines.

The museum's Learning Lab is open 10am to 5pm, only on Saturdays, and has about two dozen active volunteer members who both care for and explain the collection. The lab and warehouse are open at other times by appointment.

== Educational outreach ==
Members of the RICM run programming and robotics workshops at public libraries in Rhode Island and host their own workshops in the museum. Known as the "Learning Lab", the RICM offers classes for students interested in the uses of digital and traditional media to promote creativity, critical thinking, and hands-on computer learning opportunities. Workshop offerings include computer coding with Minecraft, dissecting electronic devices, using Raspberry Pis (credit-card sized computers), and operating with Arduinos (open software program used for interactive projects).

== Media appearances ==
RICM has been contacted to rent equipment for the sets of shows and movies from small independent projects to Hollywood blockbusters. In 2015, about one-third of the museum's total revenue came from such deals with entertainment companies.

A number of film and TV productions have used the museum's collection as part of their set design:

- Hidden Figures
- Joy
- Halt and Catch Fire
- The Americans
- Knives Out
- Severance
