= Jamestown Museum =

Coordinates: 41°29′47″N 71°22′27″W

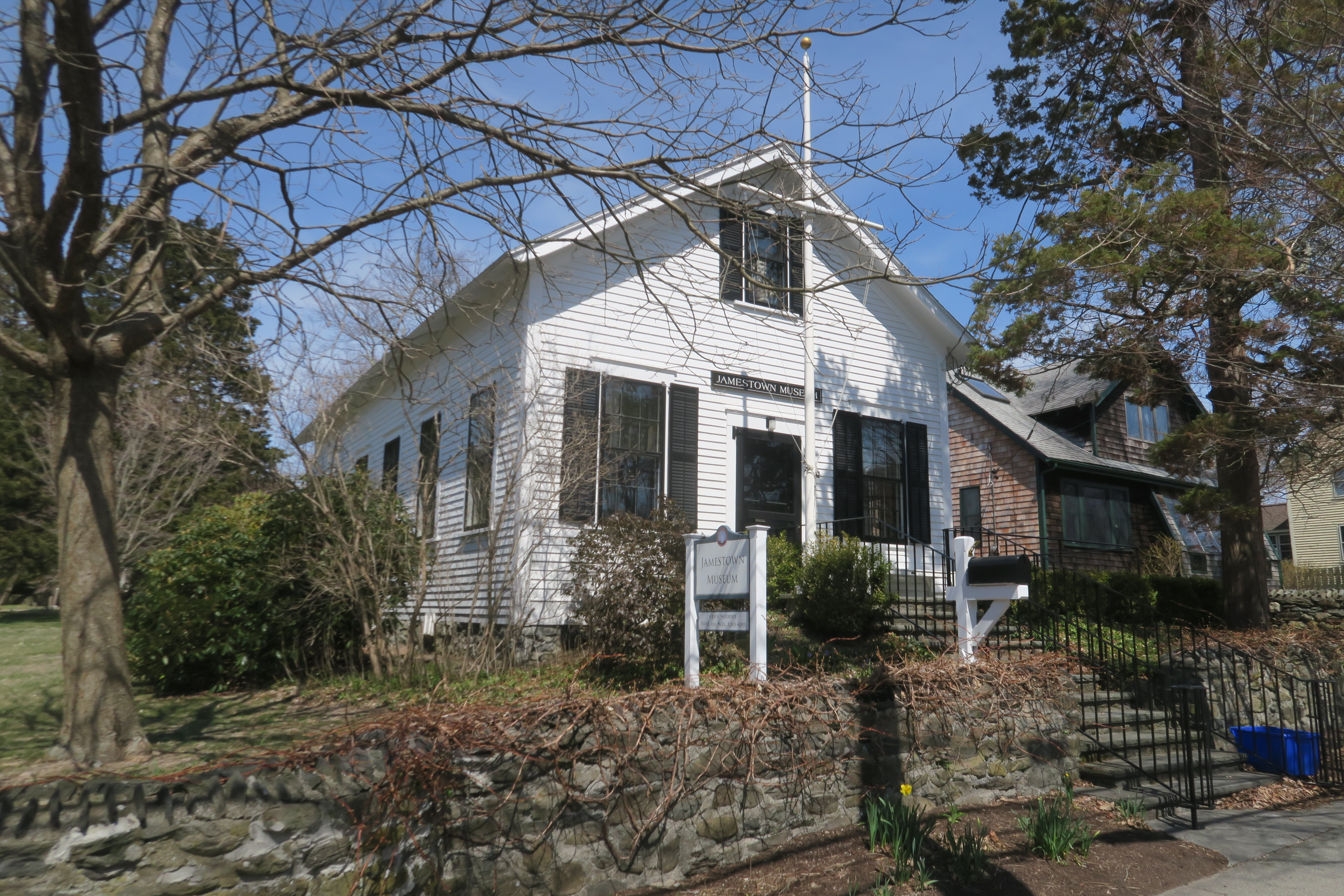
Jamestown Museum

Jamestown Museum is a local history museum which tells the history of Jamestown, Rhode Island and is run by the Jamestown Historical Society. The Jamestown Historical Society founded the museum in the current building in 1971. The building was originally as a one-room school dating from 1885, which later served as the town library from 1898 to 1971. The museum was extensively renovated in 2008. The Jamestown Historical Society also operates several other historic building museums, such as the Jamestown Windmill (1787).

== See also ==
- List of historical societies in Rhode Island
