= Jamestown Arts Center =

Coordinates: 41.4983126°N 71.3740151°W

- Location: 18 Valley Street, Jamestown, Rhode Island
- Executive Director: Christine Cocca
- Website: jamestownartcenter.org/

Jamestown Arts Center (JAC) is a non-profit arts organization with a gallery, art studios, education facilities, and event space in a renovated boat repair shop, located at 18 Valley Street in Jamestown, Rhode Island.

The JAC is operated by a volunteer Board of Directors, an Executive Director, and a staff of administrators, educators and volunteers. It is supported by philanthropic contributions and a membership program that includes supporters and affiliated artists.

The Jamestown Arts Center presents free art exhibitions in its galleries year-round, as well as outdoor sculptures and murals at its site, and a Biennial Outdoor Arts Experience exhibition of outdoor artworks throughout the town of Jamestown RI. Exhibitions have included the work of internationally exhibited artists such as Jenny Holzer, Barbara Kruger, Aboudia, Leslie Dill, Edwin Schlossberg, and Glenn Ligon.

The JAC offers arts education for people of all ages, providing a year-round schedule of classes, camps, and workshops for children, teens, and adults.

== History ==
The arts center was founded by a group of Jamestown, RI community members in 2007. In December 2009, the Jamestown Arts Center purchased a building at 18-24 Valley Street the renovated studio and gallery space opened on April 1, 2011. The JAC was awarded Best Art Gallery in Newport County by Rhode Island Monthly Magazine's Best of Rhode Island. The JAC was awarded $15,000 from the National Endowment for the Arts in 2018 and $50,000 in 2020.

== Events ==
The Jamestown Arts Center's multi-disciplinary facility hosts theater, dance, and musical performances as well as film screenings. The Jamestown Arts Center is a host site for the Manhattan Short Film Festival, the Southeast New England Film, Music & Arts Festival, the Art & Design Film Festival, and the Rhode Island Film Festival and its October sidebar, the Rhode Island International Horror Film Festival. The JAC also presents the Kingston Chamber Music Festival and performances by the Heifetz International Music Institute.
