= Cape Verdean Museum =

Museum in Pawtucket, Rhode Island, US

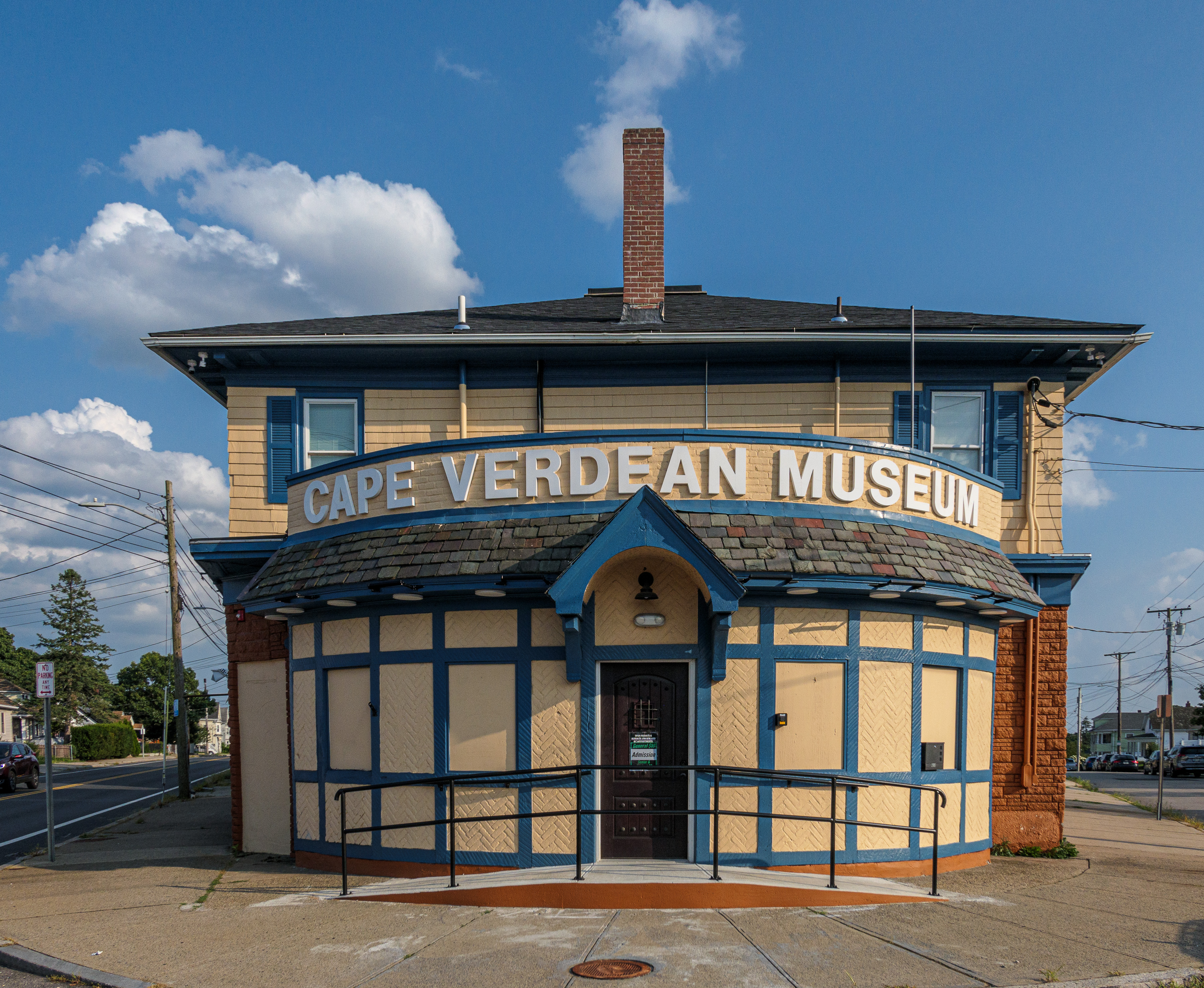
- Established: 2005
- Location: 617 Prospect St, Pawtucket, Rhode Island, US
- Coordinates: 41°51′37″N 71°22′05″W
- Director: Jose "Joe" DaMoura
- Website: capeverdeanmuseum.org

The Cape Verdean Museum is a museum located at 617 Prospect Street in Pawtucket, Rhode Island, United States. It contains exhibits, a library, and organizes community events. The museum exists to promote the history and culture of Cape Verde and Cape Verdean Americans.

== Background ==
Rhode Island has the largest Cape Verdean population per capita of any U.S. state. Early Cape Verdean immigrants to the United States worked in whaling, cranberry picking, and construction, and settled around Massachusetts and Rhode Island.

== History and building ==
The Cape Verdean Museum was founded in 2000 by Denise Oliveira as a nonprofit with the mission to promote Cape Verdean and Cape Verdean American history and culture. The museum opened on 1003 Waterman Ave in East Providence, Rhode Island in 2005. The Valley Breeze newspaper describes it as the first Cape Verdean museum in the United States. (Note: An article by The Providence Journal describes the Cape Verdean Museum as the "first Cape Verdean Museum in the whole world".) In 2022, the museum relocated to 617 Prospect St in Pawtucket, Rhode Island. Pawtucket was chosen as the new location due to the city having the largest Cape Verdean population in Rhode Island.

The building is owned by the museum and is three to four times larger than the former East Providence location. The museum received a $100,000 grant from the Rhode Island State Council on the Arts to support the renovation of the new building. The first floor houses the museum as well as a library with specialized books and film, whereas the second floor has space for events, community programming, and art exhibits. The museum organizes Kriolu language classes for the community.

== Exhibits ==
According to the museum director Jose "Joe" DaMoura, 90% of the objects displayed by the museum were donated by community members in the United States and Cape Verde. The museum has a costume worn by a member of the Tavares, as well as boxing gloves from Cape Verdean American boxers Demetrius Andrade and Kali Reis.

The museum has exhibits on the transatlantic slave trade, Cape Verdeans in Rhode Island, Cape Verdean Jewish history, Cape Verdean music, and Cape Verdean textiles.
