= James Mitchell Varnum =

American politician and pioneer (1748–1789)

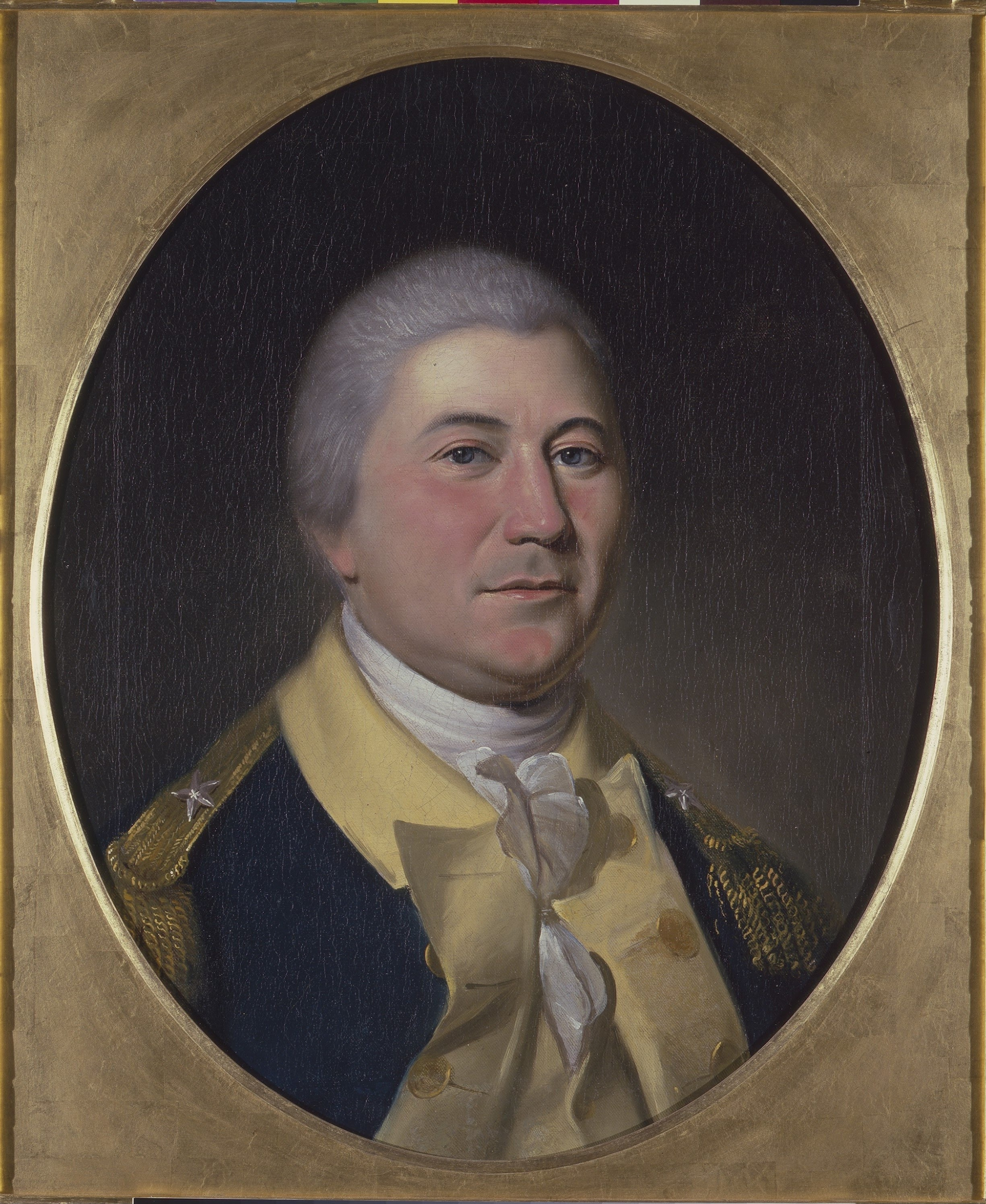
- Portrait by Charles Willson Peale, 1804
- Born: December 17, 1748; Dracut, Massachusetts, British America
- Died: January 9, 1789 (aged 40); Marietta, Northwest Territory, U.S.
- Burial place: Oak Grove Cemetery, Marietta, Ohio
- Alma mater: Brown University
- Military career
- Allegiance: United States of America
- Branch: Continental Army
- Service years: 1774–1779
- Rank: Brigadier General 1775–1779(Continental Army); Major General 1779 (Rhode Island Militia)
- Conflicts: American Revolutionary War; Siege of Boston; Battle of Long Island; Battle of White Plains; Battle of Red Bank; Valley Forge; Battle of Rhode Island
- Other work: twice elected delegate to the Continental Congress (1780-82 and 1786-87), pioneer to the Ohio Country, justice of the Supreme Court of the Northwest Territory

Signature
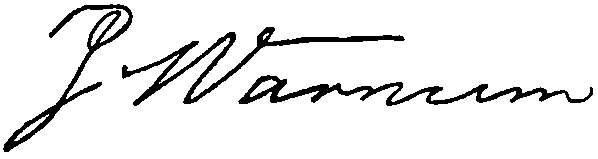

James Mitchell Varnum (December 17, 1748 – January 9, 1789) was an American legislator, lawyer, general in the Continental Army, and a pioneer to the Ohio Country. Varnum resigned his commission in 1779, and was a delegate to the Continental and Confederation Congress, as well as one of two “supreme” judges appointed to the Northwest Territory. He died in Marietta, Ohio in January 1789.

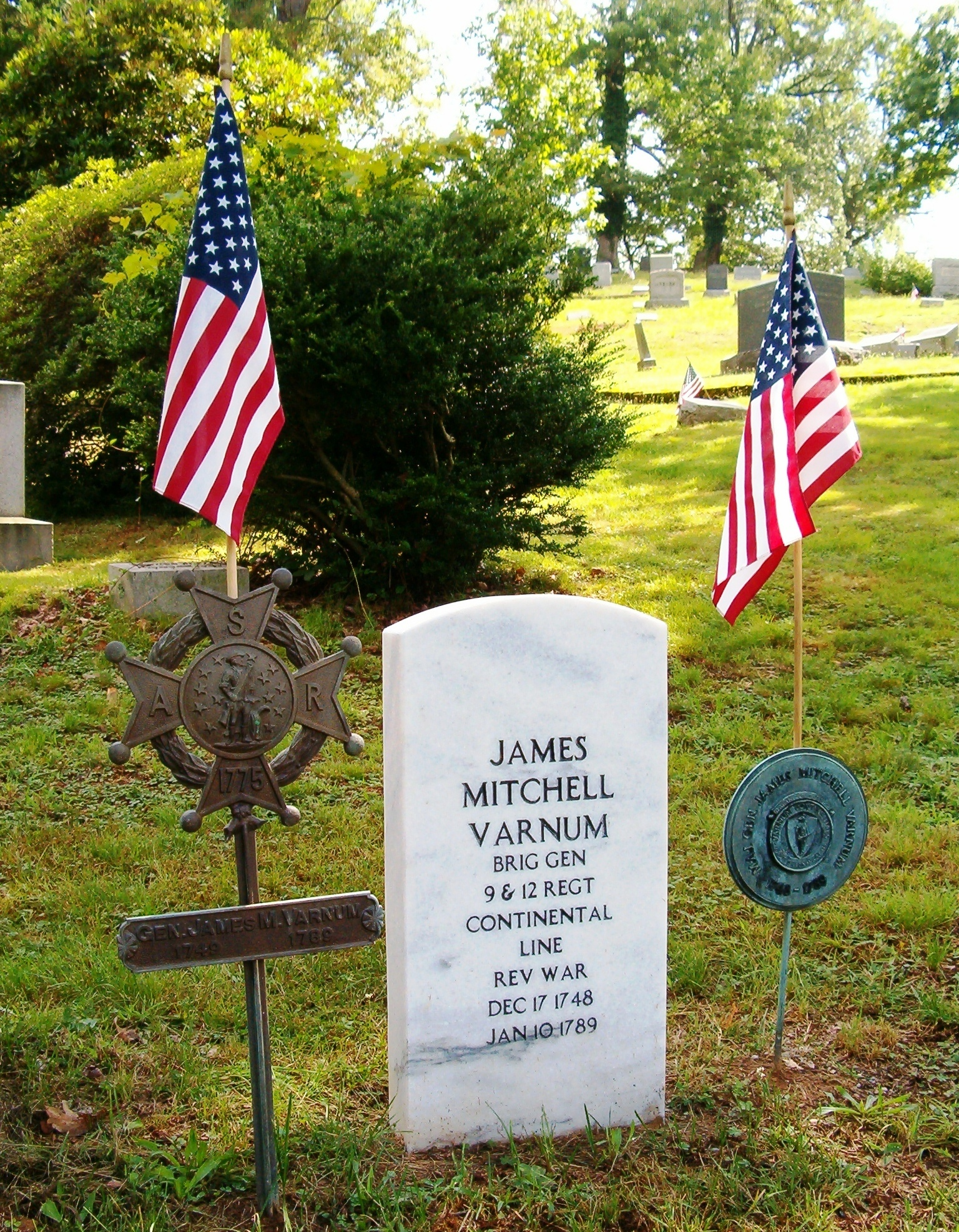
Varnum marker in Oak Grove Cemetery in Marietta, Ohio

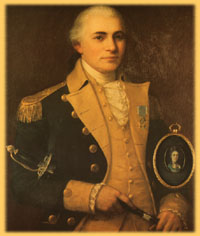
General James Mitchell Varnum, wife Martha Child inset.

== Early life ==
James Mitchell Varnum was born in Dracut, Province of Massachusetts Bay. As a young man he matriculated at Harvard College only to transfer to the college in the English Colony of Rhode Island and Providence Plantations, more commonly known as "Rhode Island College" (the college later named Brown University), He graduated with honors in the college's first graduating class in September 1769. In Rhode Island he met his future wife, Martha "Patty" Child, whom he married on February 2, 1770.

He then studied law under Rhode Island Attorney General Oliver Arnold and was admitted to the bar in 1771. He settled in East Greenwich, Rhode Island and pursued the practice of law. He began construction of his home, a colonial mansion now known as the Varnum House, in 1773.

== Leadership in the American Revolution ==
In October 1774, while tensions were rising between the American colonies and Great Britain, Varnum was elected as captain in command of the newly organized Kentish Guards, a chartered militia company in Varnum's home town of East Greenwich. Another member of the company was Private Nathanael Greene who would rise to become one of the most distinguished officers in the Continental Army and would soon be Varnum's immediate superior. No fewer than 30 other members of the Kentish Guards would also serve as officers in the Continental Army.

In May 1775, following the Battles of Lexington and Concord, Varnum was commissioned as colonel in command of one of the three regiments from Rhode Island, under the command of Brigadier General Nathanael Greene, which served in the Army of Observation during the Siege of Boston. In early July 1775 General George Washington arrived in Cambridge to take command of the Army of Observation which then became the Continental Army.

In the early part of war regiments were identified by the name of their commanding officer. Varnum's Regiment was renamed as the 9th Continental Regiment on January 1, 1776.

Varnum's regiment served throughout the Siege of Boston which ended with the evacuation of the British army on March 17, 1776. In early April the regiment marched to New York where it participated in several battles, including the Long Island and White Plains, in an unsuccessful attempt to prevent the British from occupying the city.

In December 1776 Varnum returned to Rhode Island to recruit more soldiers for the Rhode Island units in the Continental Army whose enlistments were about to expire. On December 12 Varnum accepted a commission as a brigadier general in Rhode Island Militia and given command of the state's brigade which guarded the state's mainland from possible attack from the British forces which had recently occupied the important port city of Newport.

Varnum's stay in Rhode Island was brief because he was commissioned as a brigadier general in the Continental Army in February 1777. He then served as a brigade commander until he resigned in March 1779. During this period he served at the battles of Red Bank, New Jersey in 1777 and the Battle of Rhode Island in 1778. He was also at Valley Forge during the winter of 1777 to 1778.

Varnum advocated allowing freed African American slaves to enlist in the Continental Army, which resulted in the reorganization of the 1st Rhode Island Regiment as a racially integrated unit in 1778. Varnum was a disciple of Major General Charles Lee and a serious critic of the position of Inspector General held in 1778 by Baron Von Steuben.

== Legal career and later life ==
In March 1779 Varnum resigned his Continental Army commission because of personal business matters. He was commissioned as the major general in command of the Rhode Island Militia on May 10, 1779, and held the position until he was relieved by Major General (and future U.S. Senator) Joseph Stanton, Jr. on May 7, 1788. He led Rhode Island troops in the service of the United States in July and August 1780, under the Comte de Rochambeau who commanded the French army sent by King Louis XVI of France.

In common with 33 of the 81 generals in the Continental Army, Varnum was a Freemason. He attended St. John's Lodge, No. 1 in Providence.

In 1783, at the conclusion of the Revolutionary War, along with General George Washington, Nathanael Greene, Henry Knox, Alexander Hamilton, Thomas Pinckney, Charles Cotesworth Pinckney and numerous others, General Varnum became an original member of the Society of the Cincinnati and served as president of the Rhode Island Society, following the death of Nathanael Greene, from 1786 until his death in 1789.

He represented Rhode Island at the Continental Congress in Philadelphia from May 3, 1780, to May 1, 1782, and in the 8th Confederation Congress which convened in New York from November 6, 1786, to October 30, 1787. The 8th Confederation Congress passed the Northwest Ordinance on July 13, 1787, which opened settlement in the Northwest Territories (now the states of Ohio, Indiana, Illinois, Michigan, Wisconsin and Minnesota).

Varnum was also well known as a jurist. He successfully represented the defendant in Trevett v. Weeden, one of the earliest cases of judicial review.

On August 29, 1787, he was chosen as one of the directors of the Ohio Company of Associates. On October 14 of the same year, Varnum was appointed as one of two "supreme" judges for the Northwest Territory. He then moved to Marietta, Ohio, to take up his duties. He was one of the early pioneers to the Northwest Territory, arriving in Marietta on June 5, 1788.

Shortly after his arrival Varnum was chosen to be the orator of the day for the celebration of American independence on July 4.

Varnum then assisted Territorial Governor Arthur St. Clair, who took office on July 15, in creating a code of laws for the territory. This proved to be Varnum's only significant accomplishment in Ohio as he was overcome with consumption which was exacerbated by his long journey westward.

== Death ==
General Varnum died in January 1789, only seven months after his arrival in Marietta, of consumption. He was originally interred in the Mound Cemetery near the original settlement and later reburied the Oak Grove Cemetery in Marietta.

His college classmate the distinguished physician Solomon Drowne eulogized him during an oration at the one-year anniversary celebration of the founding of Marietta:

But of these worthies who have most exerted themselves in promoting this settlement, one, alas! is no more; one whose eloquence, like the music of Orpheus, attractive of the listening crowd, seemed designed to reconcile mankind to the closest bonds of society. Ah! what avail his manly virtues now! Slow through yon winding path his corse was borne, and on the steepy hill interred with funeral honors meet. What bosom refuses the tribute of a sigh, on the recollection of that melancholy scene, when, unusual spectacle, the fathers of the land, the chiefs of the aboriginal nations, in solemn train attended; while the mournful dirge was rendered doubly mournful mid the gloomy nodding grove. On that day even nature seemed to mourn. O Varnum ! Varnum! thy name shall not be forgotten, while gratitude and generosity continue to be the characteristics of those inhabiting the country, once thy care. Thy fair fame is deeply rooted in our fostering memories ...

== Family ==
General Varnum was the son of Samuel Varnum (1715–1797) and his second wife Hannah Mitchell. He had three brothers and two sisters of which only two brothers, Joseph Bradley Varnum (1751–1821) and Samuel Varnum (1762–1822), lived to maturity.

Joseph Bradley Varnum served as a United States representative from Massachusetts from 1795 to 1811 and then as a United States senator from 1811 to 1817.

== Legacy ==
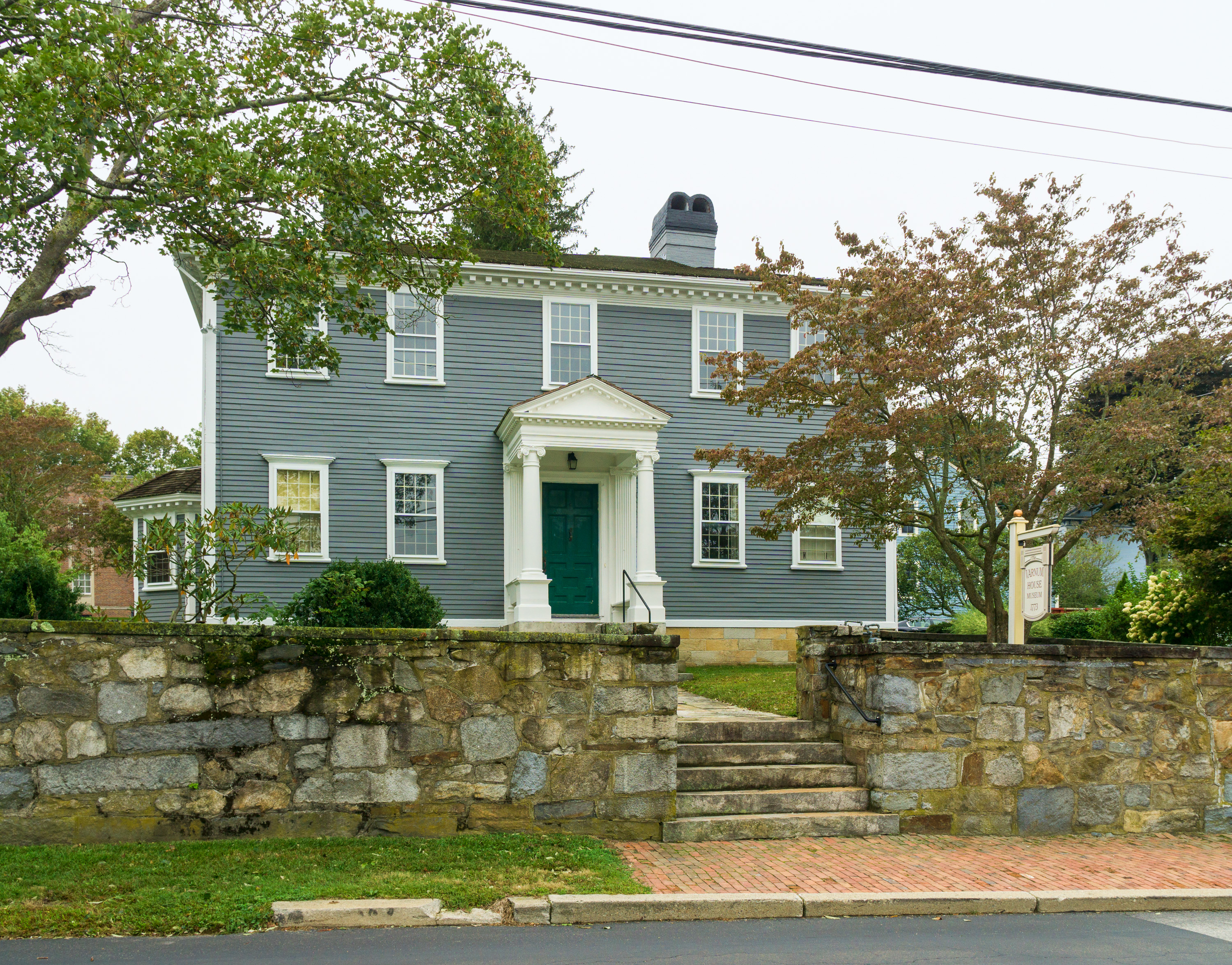
Varnum's house at 57 Peirce Street in East Greenwich, Rhode Island

General Varnum's home, the Gen. James Mitchell Varnum House in East Greenwich, Rhode Island is a historic house museum today. Varnum's brother was Speaker of the United States House of Representatives Joseph Bradley Varnum.

The Varnum Continentals, an historic military command in East Greenwich, were founded in 1907 and are named after General Varnum.

== Dates of rank ==
- Captain, Kentish Guards, Rhode Island Militia – November 1774
- Colonel, Varnum's Regiment, Army of Observation – May 3, 1775
- Colonel, Varnum's Regiment, Continental Army – July 3, 1775
- Colonel, 9th Continental Regiment – January 1, 1776
- Brigadier General, Rhode Island Militia – December 12, 1776
- Brigadier General, Continental Army – February 27, 1777
- Resigned from Continental Army – March 5, 1779
- Major General, Rhode Island Militia – May 10, 1779, to May 7, 1788

== See also ==
- 1st Rhode Island Regiment
- 9th Continental Regiment

== Bibliography ==
- Conley, P. T.: Rhode Island's Founders: From Settlement to Statehood, The History Press, Charleston, South Carolina (2010).
- Dodge, A. R.: Biographical Directory of the United States Congress, 1774-2005, Sixteenth Edition, U.S. Government Printing Office, Washington, D.C. (2005).
- Heitman, Francis B.: Officers of the Continental Army during the War of the Revolution, Rare Book Shop Publishing Co., Washington, D.C. (1914).
- Hildreth, S. P.: Biographical and Historical Memoirs of the Early Pioneer Settlers of Ohio, H. W. Derby and Co., Cincinnati, Ohio (1852).
- Hildreth, S. P.: Pioneer History: Being an Account of the First Examinations of the Ohio Valley, and the Early Settlement of the Northwest Territory, H. W. Derby and Co., Cincinnati, Ohio (1848).
- Leiter, M. T.: Biographical Sketches of the Generals of the Continental Army of the Revolution, University Press: John Wilson and Son, Cambridge, Massachusetts (1889).
- Updike, W.: Memoirs of the Rhode Island Bar, Thomas H. Webb and Co., Boston, Massachusetts (1842).
- Varnum, J. M.: A Sketch of the Life and Public Services of James Mitchell Varnum of Rhode Island, David Clapp and Son Printers, Boston, Massachusetts (1906).
