= Barrington Preservation Society =

Coordinates: 41.740485°N 71.307107°W

Barrington Preservation Society is a museum and preservation society in Barrington, Rhode Island.

The BPS was founded in 1885 as the “Barrington Historic Antiquarian Society” and renamed the “Barrington Preservation Society” in 1965. The society is dedicated to telling the history of the Town of Barrington, Rhode Island through its museum and events.

== See also ==
- List of historical societies in Rhode Island
