= Paradise School =

- U.S. National Register of Historic Places
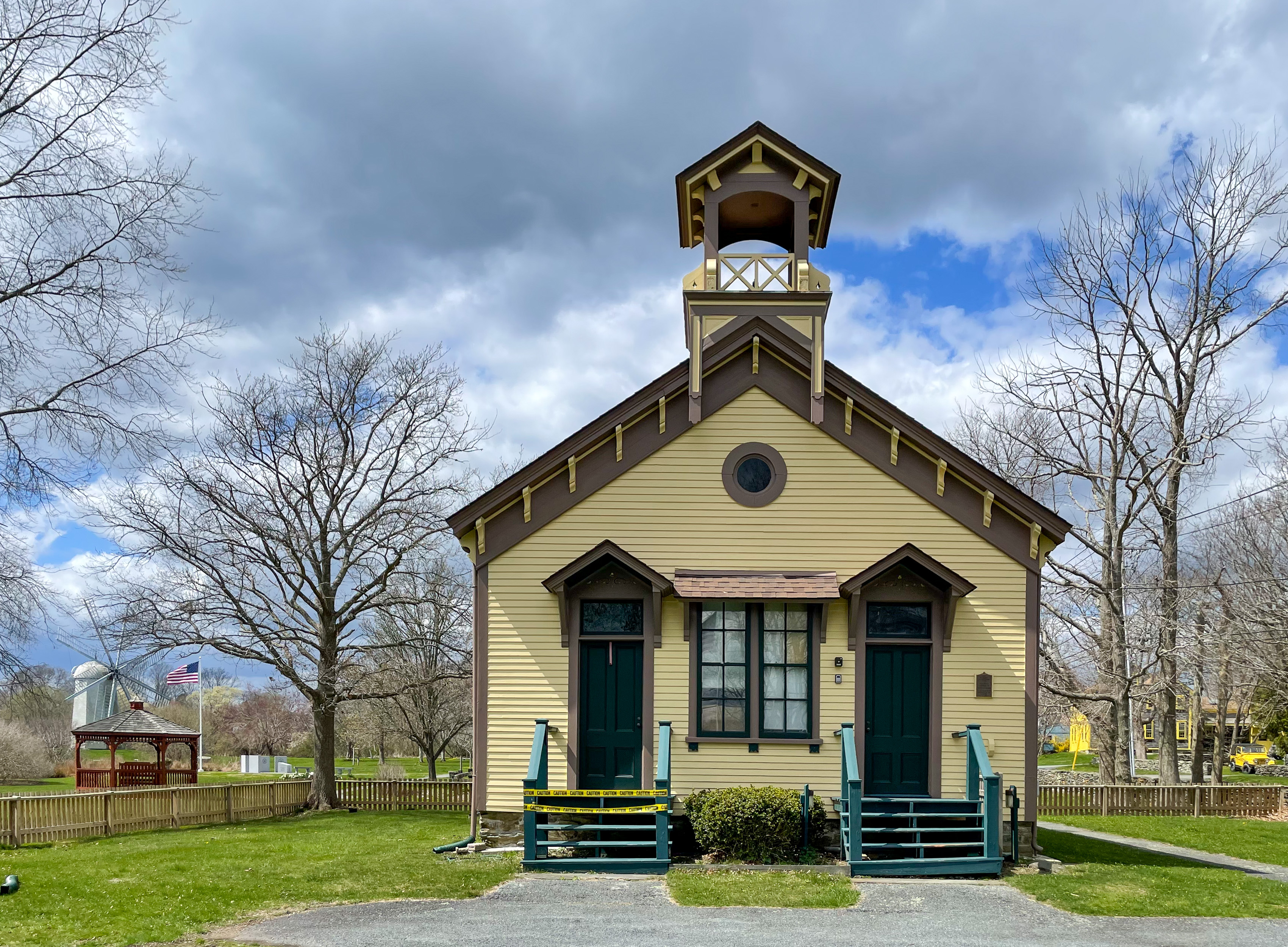

- Location within Rhode Island Location within the United States
- Location: Middletown, Rhode Island
- Coordinates: 41°30′06″N 71°16′06″W
- Built: 1875
- NRHP reference No.: 78000069
- Added to NRHP: May 5, 1978

The Paradise School is an historic school building at Paradise Avenue and Prospect Street in Middletown, Rhode Island. It is situated on farm land which historically belonged to the Whitman family for generations, and was donated by the family to the town of Middletown. Built in 1875, it is a modest wood-frame structure, housing a single classroom, with separate entrances and vestibules for boys and girls. The roof line has decorative sawn brackets, and there is a small oculus window in the front-facing gable. The two doorways, like the windows on the sides, are sheltered by small shed roofs clad in wooden shingles.

Classes were held in the building until 1955 when it became an administration office. The Middletown Historical Society acquired the building in 1976 and was later restored and holds a small museum.

The building was listed on the National Register of Historic Places in 1978.

== See also ==
- List of historical societies in Rhode Island
- National Register of Historic Places listings in Newport County, Rhode Island
