= Gen. James Mitchell Varnum House =

Historic house in Rhode Island, United States

- U.S. National Register of Historic Places
- U.S. Historic district – Contributing property
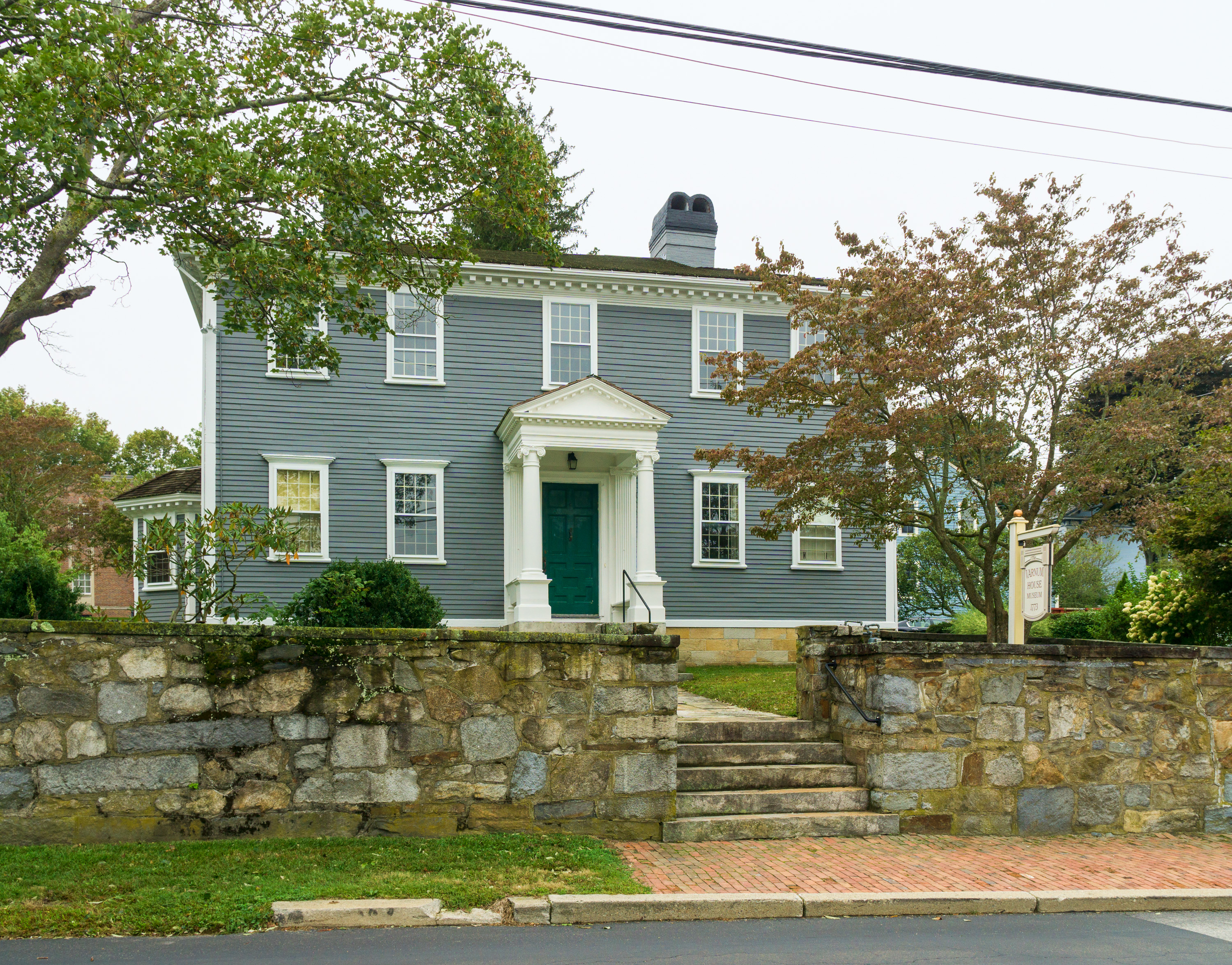

- Location within Rhode Island Location within the United States
- Location: East Greenwich, Rhode Island
- Coordinates: 41°39′49″N 71°27′6″W
- Built: 1773
- Part of: East Greenwich Historic District (ID74000036)
- NRHP reference No.: 71000016

Significant dates
- Added to NRHP: August 12, 1971
- Designated CP: June 13, 1974

The General James Mitchell Varnum House is a historic house at 57 Peirce Street in East Greenwich, Rhode Island. The 2 1/2-story wood-frame house was built in 1773 for James Mitchell Varnum, who later served as a general in the Continental Army during the American Revolutionary War. It is five bays wide, with two interior brick chimneys. Its main entry is sheltered by a portico supported by fluted Ionic columns and pilasters. A 19th-century addition extends from the rear of the main block. Notable later house residents include George A. Brayton, who served as Chief Justice of the Rhode Island Supreme Court. The house was purchased in 1939 by the Varnum Continentals and has since served as a museum.

The house was listed on the National Register of Historic Places in 1971.

== See also ==
- National Register of Historic Places listings in Kent County, Rhode Island

== Images ==
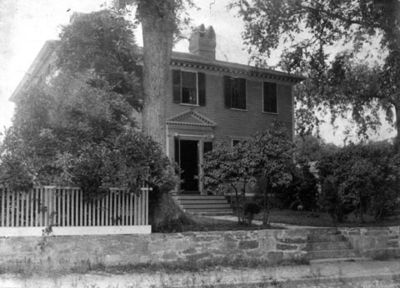
Varnum House in 1887

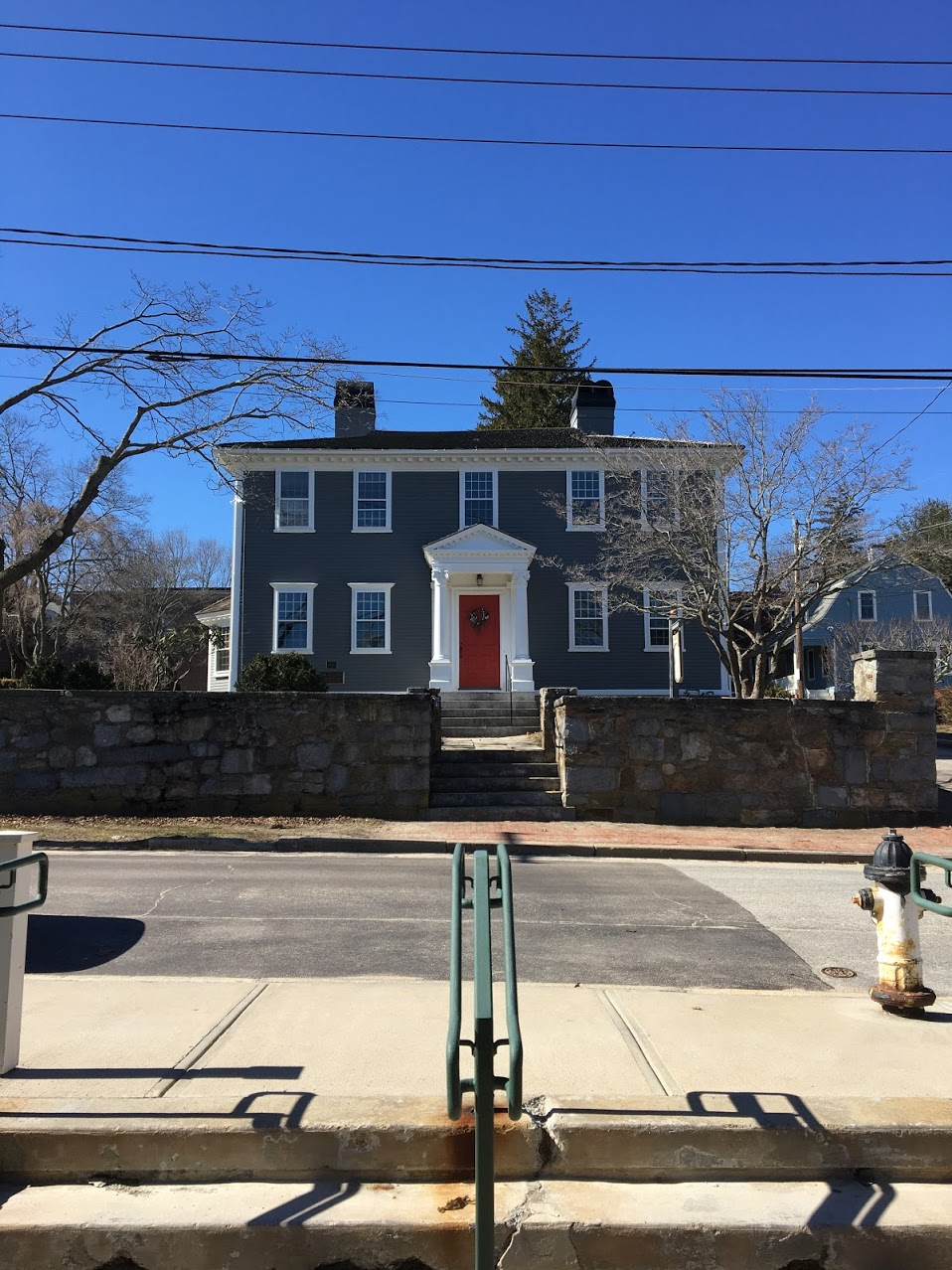
Varnum House in 2018
