= Watson Farm =

Historic farm in Jamestown, Rhode Island

Coordinates: 41.520467°N 71.380709°W

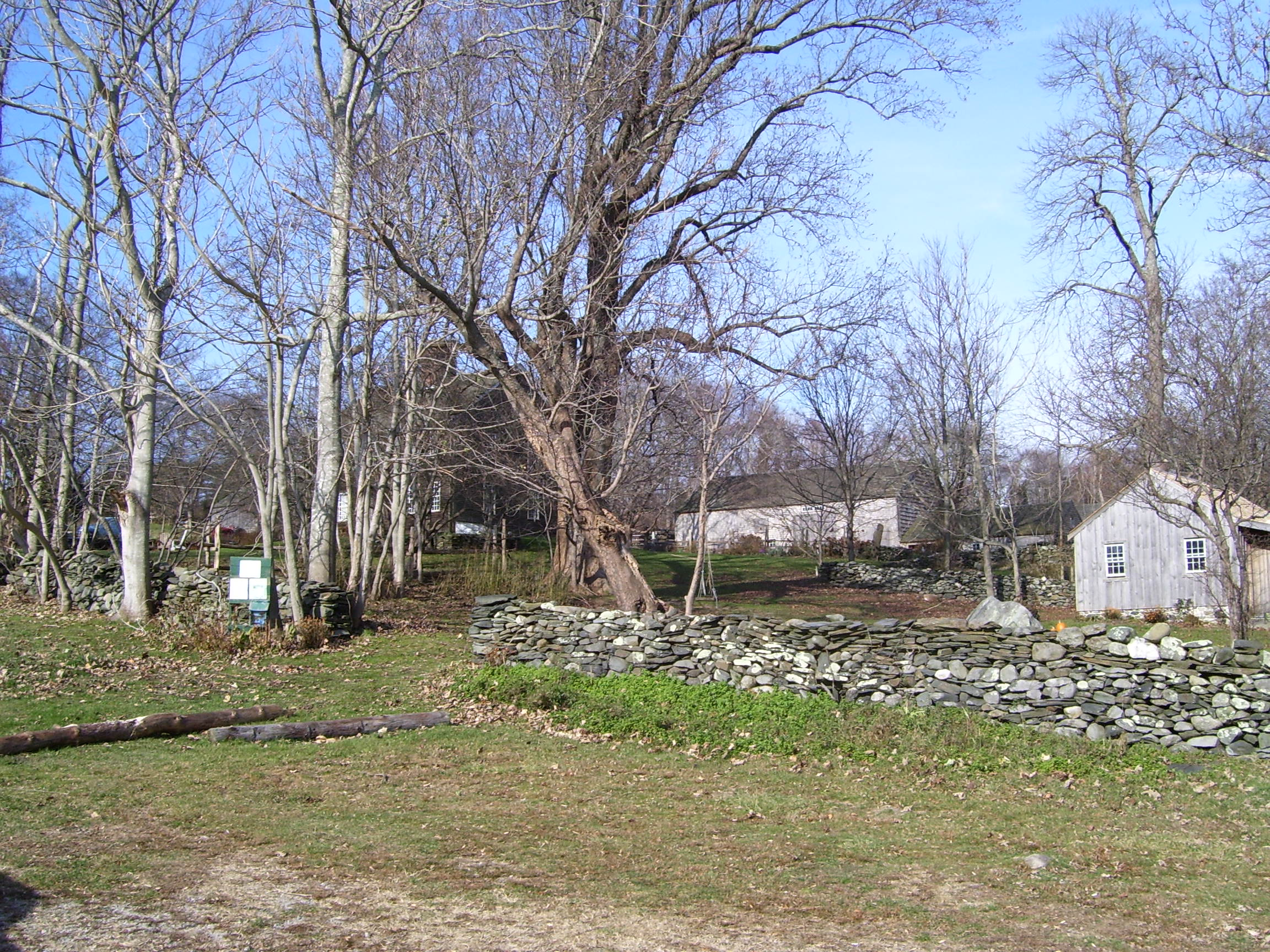
- Watson Farm in 2008
- Established: 1789
- Location: Jamestown, Rhode Island, U.S.
- Type: Open-air museum
- Owner: Historic New England

Watson Farm in Jamestown, Rhode Island, United States, was established in 1789. Job Watson purchased a piece of the farmland, and for the next two centuries, five successive generations of the Watson family cultivated the land, changing their crops and practices as needed to adapt to the evolving market.

Today, the property is still a working family farm, and the 1796 house is still used as the farmers' residence. The farmers raise cattle and sheep for beef, lamb, and wool markets, grow acres of grass for winter hay supplies, make compost for fertilizer, and cultivate a large vegetable garden. The farm, which is owned by Historic New England, holds a CSA farmer's market each summer.

== See also ==
- Open-air museum
