= J. S. Lovering Wharton =

American manufacturer and financier

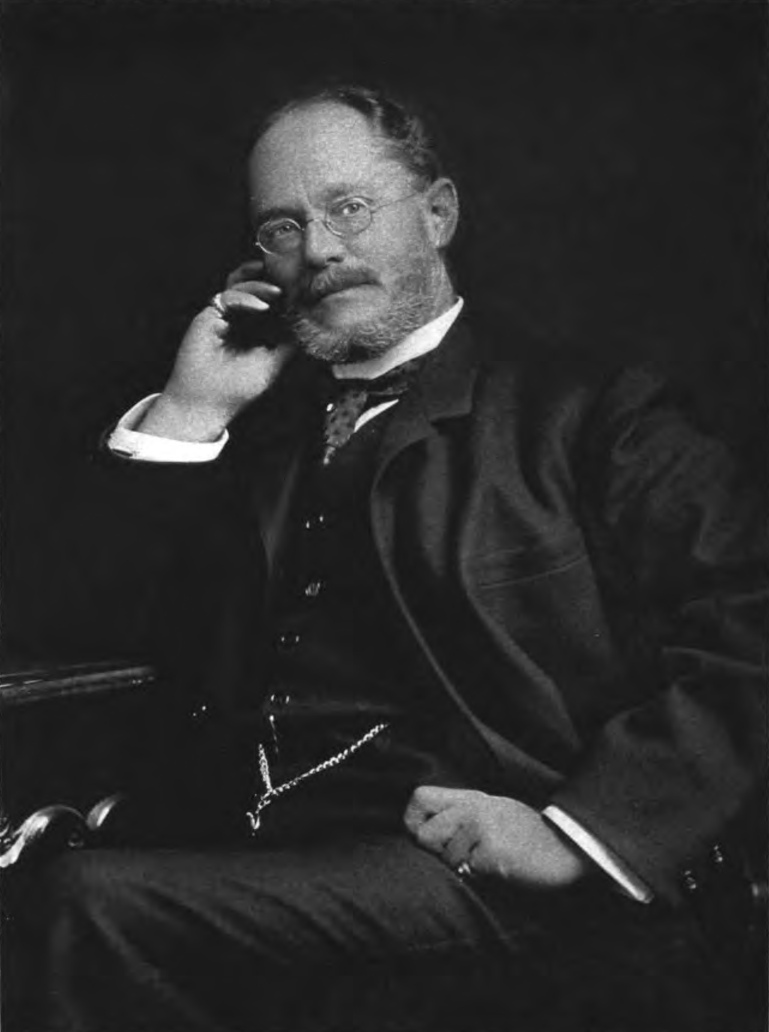
J. S. Lovering Wharton

Joseph Samuel Lovering Wharton (August 5, 1850 – 1931) was an American manufacturer and financier from Philadelphia. His father, Charles William Wharton, was the brother of Joseph Wharton, founder of Wharton School of the University of Pennsylvania. His mother was Mary (Lovering).

After finishing his education at Friends Central School and the University of Pennsylvania, Wharton entered the foundry business in 1871. He would later acquire the right to manufacture the Harrison boiler, and become president of the renamed company, Harrison Safety Boiler Works. In addition, Wharton served as treasurer of the Germantown Trust Company, and judge of election in the Farmers' and Mechanics' National Bank.

In 1873, Wharton married Charlotte M. Brown, who died 13 years later with no children. In 1889, he married Amelia Bird Shoemaker, with whom he had three children: Charles William (born 1893), Joseph S. Lovering Jr. (born 1896), and Samuel Brinton Shoemaker (born 1904).

In 1905, Wharton had a house built near Jamestown, Rhode Island, which he named Clingstone.
