= Edmund Lewis =

Edmund Lewis may refer to:

- Edmund Darch Lewis (1835–1910), American landscape painter
- Edmund H. Lewis (1884–1972), American lawyer and politician from New York
