= Samuel Rowland Fisher =

American merchant

Samuel Rowland Fisher (November 6, 1745 – May 6, 1834) was a Philadelphia merchant involved in transatlantic trade. He owned a large shipping line that ran between London and Philadelphia, but was exiled and imprisoned during the Revolutionary War because of his Quaker beliefs.

== Early years ==
Fisher was born in Lewes, Delaware, into a Quaker family with historic roots, growing up in Philadelphia. His father, Joshua Fisher, was the grandson of John Fisher who came to America aboard the Welcome with William Penn. His mother, Sarah Rowland, was the granddaughter of Mary Harworth, an eloquent Friends minister who had also arrived on the Welcome. Fisher's father Joshua moved the family to Philadelphia in 1746 and established a home and large mercantile business at 110 S Front St., soon after starting the first packet line of ships to sail regularly between Philadelphia and London. Fisher's father also purchased a country estate north of the city overlooking the Schuylkill River from the east and built a house there in 1753 called "The Cliffs."

== Mercantile business ==
When Fisher and his four brothers came of age, their father named the business "Joshua Fisher & Sons" (1762–1783), and engaged the brothers in all aspects of it. Customers were able to order items such as porcelain, silverware, brass pulls for dressers, and every other imaginable type of merchandise from a detailed catalog. The business prospered because customers could receive reasonably priced goods within weeks. Fisher eventually took over most of the business from his father and brothers, continuing for the rest of his life to run the packet line to London. He traveled widely in America and England (1767–68) and made notes on the manufacture of textile, glassware, and ceramic items for inclusion in the catalog.

== Revolutionary War and family ==
As many Quakers did during the Revolution, Fisher and his family tried to maintain a neutral position with respect to the war with England, but he firmly opposed belligerency in the revolutionary cause, possibly because much of the family business, which involved in trade with London, came to a halt during the war years. He and his family suffered because of this. Much of the family's inventory of merchandise was commandeered by the military to support the revolutionary cause, but they were not fully reimbursed for it.

In 1777, Fisher and his brothers refused to deliver their firm's business records to the authorities, and since they were Quakers they refused to swear an oath of allegiance. Fisher, along with his brothers Thomas and Miers and about twenty other Quakers, were exiled to Winchester, Virginia, where they were kept under house arrest for a year. Although they were treated somewhat harshly they survived without severe illness, but their brother-in-law Thomas Gilpin and John Hunt died. They were allowed out of their houses to dine elsewhere and received mail and guests. They were eventually pardoned and allowed to return to Philadelphia by order of George Washington and Congress after the British evacuated.

However, Fisher, who by then had begun a course towards eccentricity, continued to show opposition to the revolutionary cause, and was arrested in 1779 on the charge of being a Tory on the basis of a letter he sent to his brother Jabez Maud in New York City. He refused to recognize the authority of the court and was imprisoned in downtown Philadelphia for 2 years. He kept careful journals of his trips and prison terms which have been well preserved. He had disdain for the excitement seen in Philadelphia from the Continental Army led by George Washington. Many Quakers, and even some of his family, opposed his strong stand against authority and the revolutionary fervor, and at one point he was threatened to be "read out of Meeting" (disowned).

== Business after the Revolution ==
After the war, Fisher resumed his transatlantic business, made new business deals with firms in England (1783–4) and continued his prosperous business. He traveled to Bristol, England, Nottingham, Manchester, Sheffield, Warrington, and elsewhere to visit textile mills and other manufacturers, comparing their quality and prices. The English could no longer appropriate cheap raw materials from the colonies and sell back the finished goods at exorbitant prices as they had before the Revolution, but Fisher's business, with reasonable prices, made profits on many goods that were not yet manufactured in North America.

Fisher often traded local agricultural products for the English manufactured goods. Once, Fisher had shipped the yearly cargo of flaxseed to England just before the embargo preceding the War of 1812. As a result, other ship cargoes of flaxseed could not get through and the price Fisher received on his flaxseed in England rose higher than he thought was justified. From this concern, he gave the excess profits to start negro schools in Delaware.

== Simplicity ==
Fisher was a typical Quaker merchant in that he was very successful because of his scrupulous honesty, but carried this much farther than others, often trying to import a moral lesson. On one occasion, because hatchets in his store were not selling well, he tried to sell them at a reduced price, but refused to sell to a customer who wanted hatchets to fight the Indians. He had doubts about proper conduct in both business and personal affairs, and found solace in following strict discipline. He became friends with Elias Hicks who was a leading Quaker traveling preacher teaching simplicity and discipline.

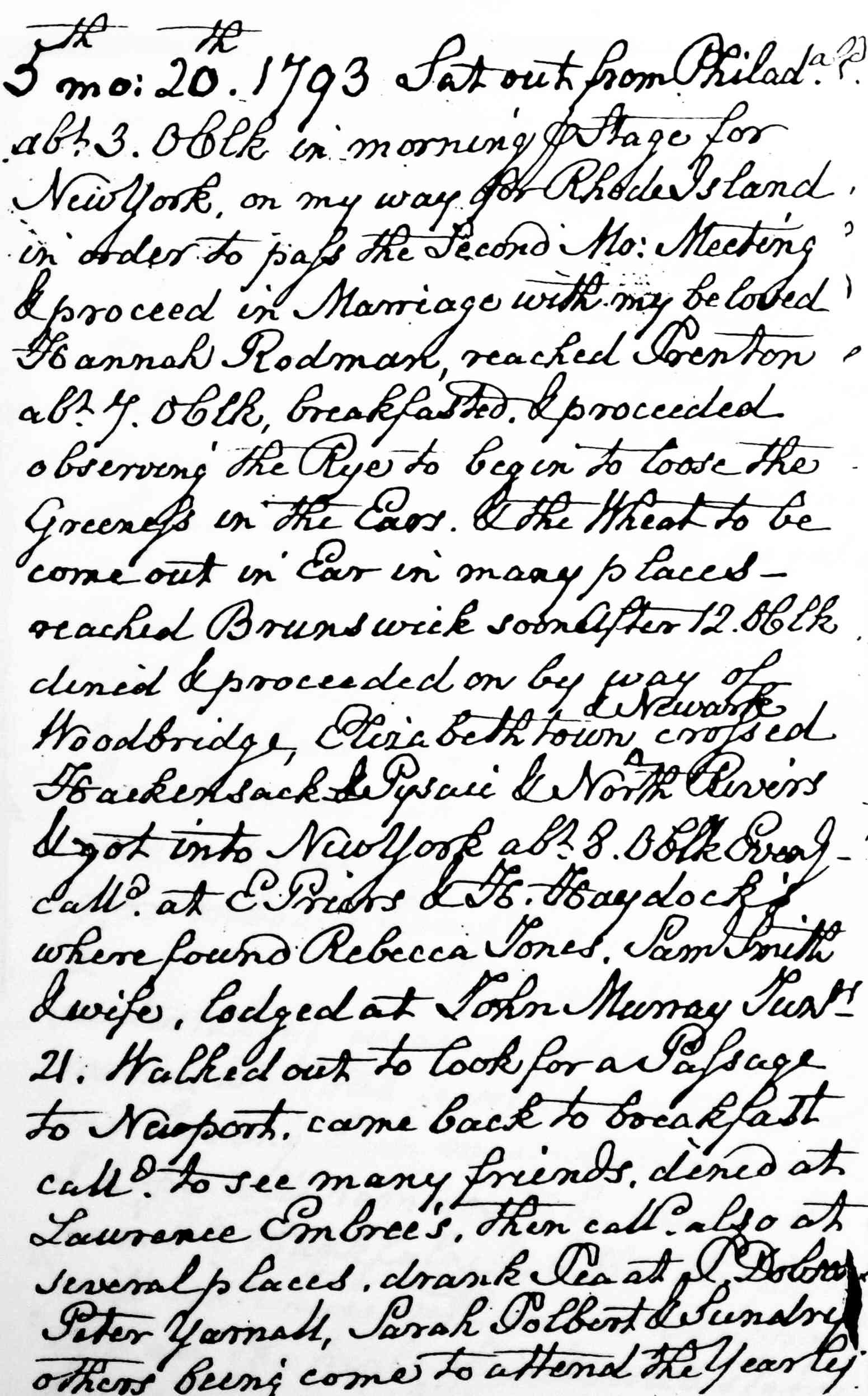
Samuel Fisher's diary of his trip to marry his wife Hannah in Newport, RI

== Marriage and family life ==
Fisher, oddly, was cared for by his sister Esther (Hetty) until his 48th year, when he married Hannah Rodman of Newport, Rhode Island, a descendant of Thomas Cornell, in a hastily arranged ceremony in Newport. He had made her acquaintance on his numerous trips and had corresponded with her from Philadelphia. She was tall and beautiful, and because Quakers at that time were restricted, as were many other denominations, to marrying "within the Meeting," her choices for marrying in the Newport area were limited. On May 20, 1793, Fisher traveled by stagecoach to New York, then took a boat to Newport, proposing to Hannah immediately upon arrival at the Rodman house. She at first agreed, but in June when his relatives were delayed, she had second thoughts. They were finally married on June 6, and Fisher brought her back to Philadelphia to live at his home at 110 S. Front Street. Fisher was active in the local Quaker Meeting and became aligned with the abolitionist cause. His wife Hannah became skilled at preaching. Fisher's rotator cuff was damaged from repeated sporting accidents.

The family, with daughters Sarah and Deborah and son Thomas, continued to live at 110 S. Front Street along the waterfront of Philadelphia. They became friends with the Whartons who lived in a house nearby. The Fishers spent summers at The Cliffs which, perched high above the Schuylkill River, was cooler and more free of mosquitoes than their city dwelling, and the Wharton estate was also nearby. Fisher's daughter Deborah married William Wharton, and their son was Joseph Wharton, a prominent industrialist who founded the Wharton School of Business.
