= Charles L. Bevins =

American architect

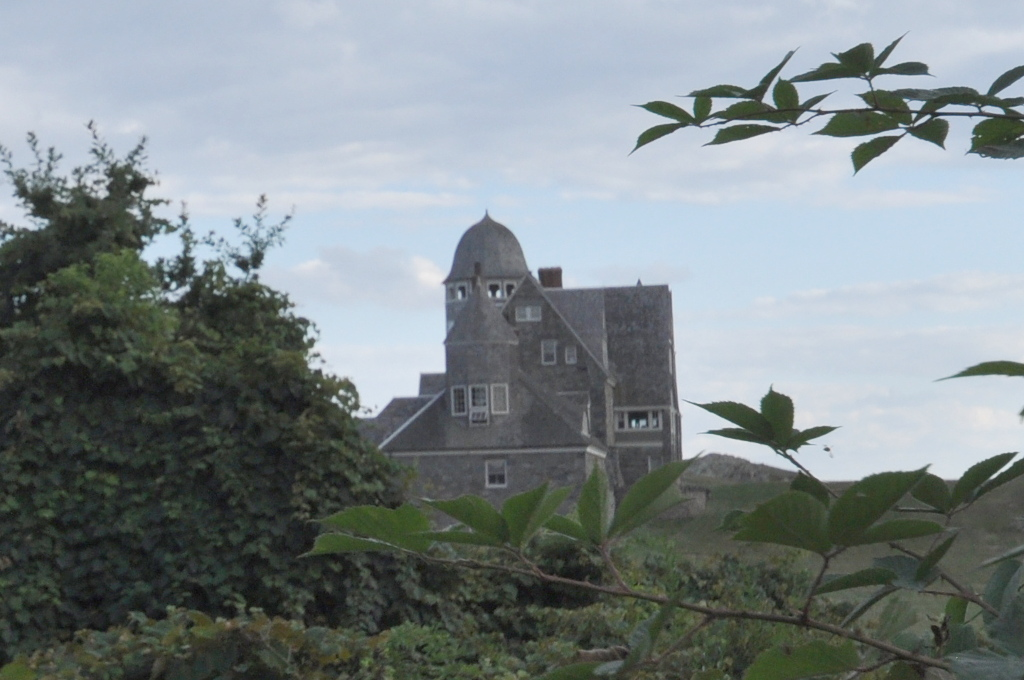
Horsehead, Jamestown, RI. 1883–84.

Charles Lovatt Bevins (1844–1925) was an American architect from Jamestown, Rhode Island.

Bevins was born in Manchester, England, in 1844. In 1878 he emigrated to the United States, settling in Boston. There, he worked for Cummings & Sears and Peabody & Stearns, noted for their Shingle Style designs. In 1882, Bevins relocated to Jamestown, where he opened his own office. In 1884, he moved it to Newport, Rhode Island, but retained his home in Jamestown. He practiced until his retirement in 1903.

Bevins specialized in Shingle Style "cottages" for summer residents.

== Works ==
- Braecleugh (Charles Wharton Cottage), Fort Wetherill Rd., Jamestown, RI (1883) – Demolished 1890s for Fort Wetherill.
- Horsehead (Joseph Wharton Cottage), 240 Highland Dr., Jamestown, RI (1883–84, 1889–90)
- The Barnacle (Thomas O. Selfridge Cottage), 15 Dumpling Dr., Jamestown, RI (1885)
- Beach Haven (David Kindleberger Cottage), 141 Conanicus Ave., Jamestown, RI (1886–87)
- Rebecca Hunter House, 103 Church St., Newport, RI (1887)
- Ledgehurst (Daniel L. Hazard Cottage), 89 Walcott Ave., Jamestown, RI (1887)
- The Boulders (Charles Larner Cottage), 52 Newport St., Jamestown, RI (1888)
- The Ramparts (Robert E. Patterson Cottage), 27 Newport St., Jamestown, RI (1888)
- Anoatok (John P. Green Cottage), 95 Walcott Ave., Jamestown, RI (1889)
- Red Top (Thomas O. Selfridge Jr. Cottage), 185 Walcott Ave., Jamestown, RI (1889)
- Rockburn (Francis B. Rice Cottage), 359 Highland Ave., Jamestown, RI (1889)
- Tunstall Smith Cottage, 144 Walcott Ave., Jamestown, RI (1889)
- Thorndike Hotel, 25 Conanicus Ave., Jamestown, RI (1889) – Bevins' largest commission. Burned 1912.
- Wawbeck (Harry C. Potter Cottage), 133 Fort Wetherill Rd., Jamestown, RI (1890)
- James T. Wright House, 25 Cranston Ave., Newport, RI (1890–91)
- Fowler's Rocks (Theophilus Stork Cottage), 340 E. Shore Rd., Jamestown, RI (1892)
- Horgan Block, 224 Thames St., Newport, RI (1892) – Demolished.
- Stephen H. Gurteen Cottage, 64 Bay View Dr., Jamestown, RI (1892) – Demolished.
- St. Mark's Episcopal Church, 60 Narragansett Ave., Jamestown, RI (1892) – Demolished 1954.
- Harbor Entrance (Isaac Clothier Cottage), 2 Fort Wetherill Rd., Jamestown, RI (1893) – Demolished 1967.
- Clemence B. Faris Cottage, 51 Walcott Ave., Jamestown, RI (1895) – Burned 1938.
- Half Acre (Elizabeth Clark Cottage), 170 Walcott Ave., Jamestown, RI (1895)
- Ephron Catlin Cottage, 24 Emerson Rd., Jamestown, RI (1897–98)
- Abbot Chandler Cottage, 73 Conanicus Ave., Jamestown, RI (1897) – Demolished 1984.
- Charles W. Bailey Cottage, 121 Walcott Ave., Jamestown, RI (1898–99)
