= The Cliffs =

Historic house in Pennsylvania, United States

- U.S. National Register of Historic Places
- Philadelphia Register of Historic Places
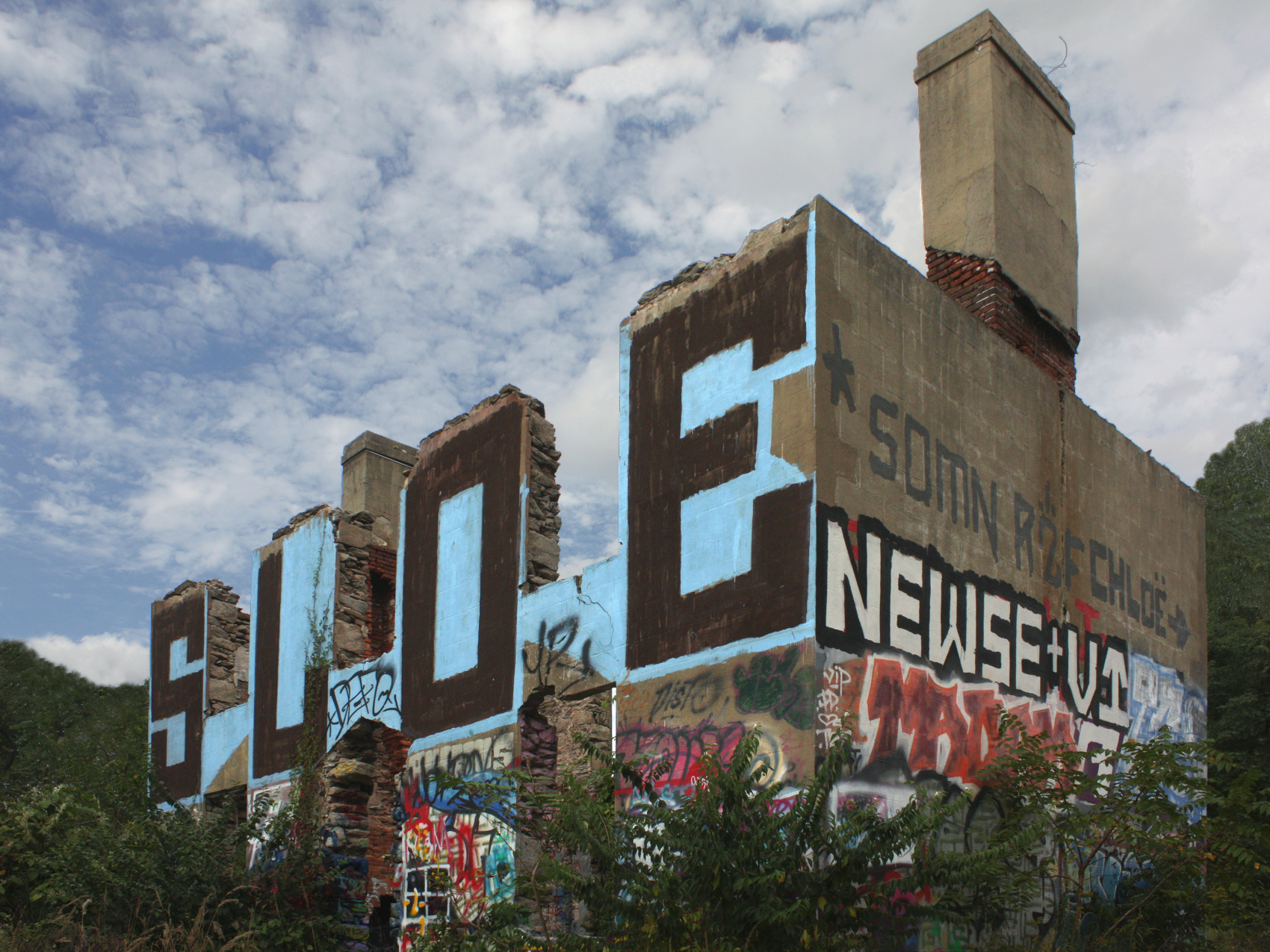
- The Cliffs with graffiti (2017)

- Location within Philadelphia Location within Pennsylvania Location within the United States
- Location: East Fairmount Park near 33rd Street, Philadelphia, Pennsylvania
- Coordinates: 39°58′45.8832″N 75°11′38.7276″W
- Built: 1753
- Architectural style: Georgian
- NRHP reference No.: 72001147
- Added to NRHP: March 16, 1972

The Cliffs is a historic country house located near 33rd and Oxford Streets in East Fairmount Park, Philadelphia. It is a Registered Historic Place.

== History ==
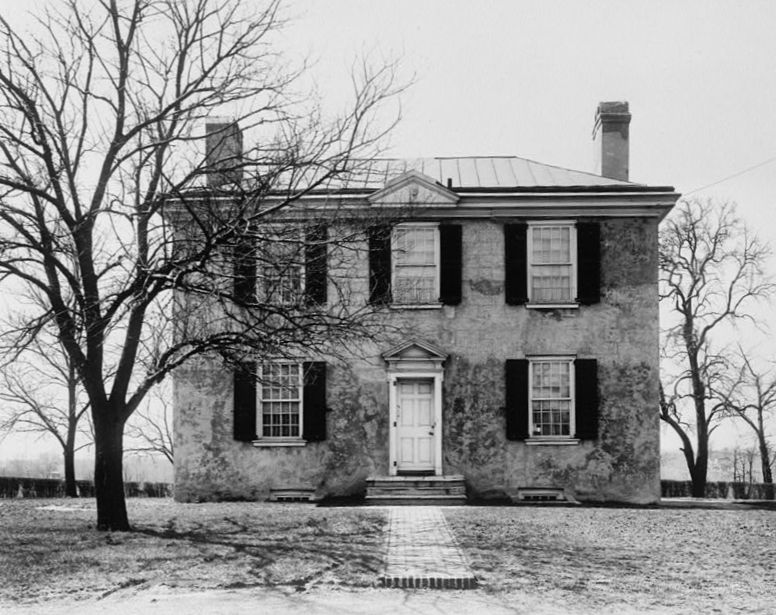
The Cliffs in 1931

The Cliffs was built in 1753 by Philadelphia merchant Joshua Fisher (1707–1783), the great-grandfather of Joseph Wharton. It overlooks the Schuylkill River from the east, just north of the Girard Avenue Bridge and quite close to where Fountain Green Drive meets Kelly Drive along the river. It is a country house in the Georgian style, constructed in stone, with two stories and a basement, originally heated by double fireplaces on both floors and basement. The estate surrounding the house included a farm.

The house was the location where Benjamin Franklin's daughter, Sarah Franklin Bache, and her sewing group made clothing and bandages for the Continental soldiers during the Revolutionary War.

Joshua Fisher settled in Lewes, Delaware, marrying Sarah Rodman, and as a young man started a hat-making business using the locally plentiful animal skins. He developed a robust transatlantic trade in animal pelts and became wealthy, moving his family to downtown Philadelphia in 1746, and building the Cliffs as a country getaway. He brought his family to the Cliffs house and farm in the summer and they grew up interested in nature, with an appreciation of the Quaker testimony of simplicity. Fisher's son Samuel Rowland Fisher, his wife Hannah Rodman Fisher, and their three children, Sarah, Deborah, and Thomas, spent their summers in the house during the years 1793–1834.

The house remained in the Fisher family for more than 100 years until the Fairmount Park Commission purchased it in 1868. The house was rented and maintained until the 1960s when it became vacant. The house had a substantial amount of woodwork and paneling. It was taken over and repaired in the 1960s by the Shackamaxon Society, a local civic group.

== Vandalism ==
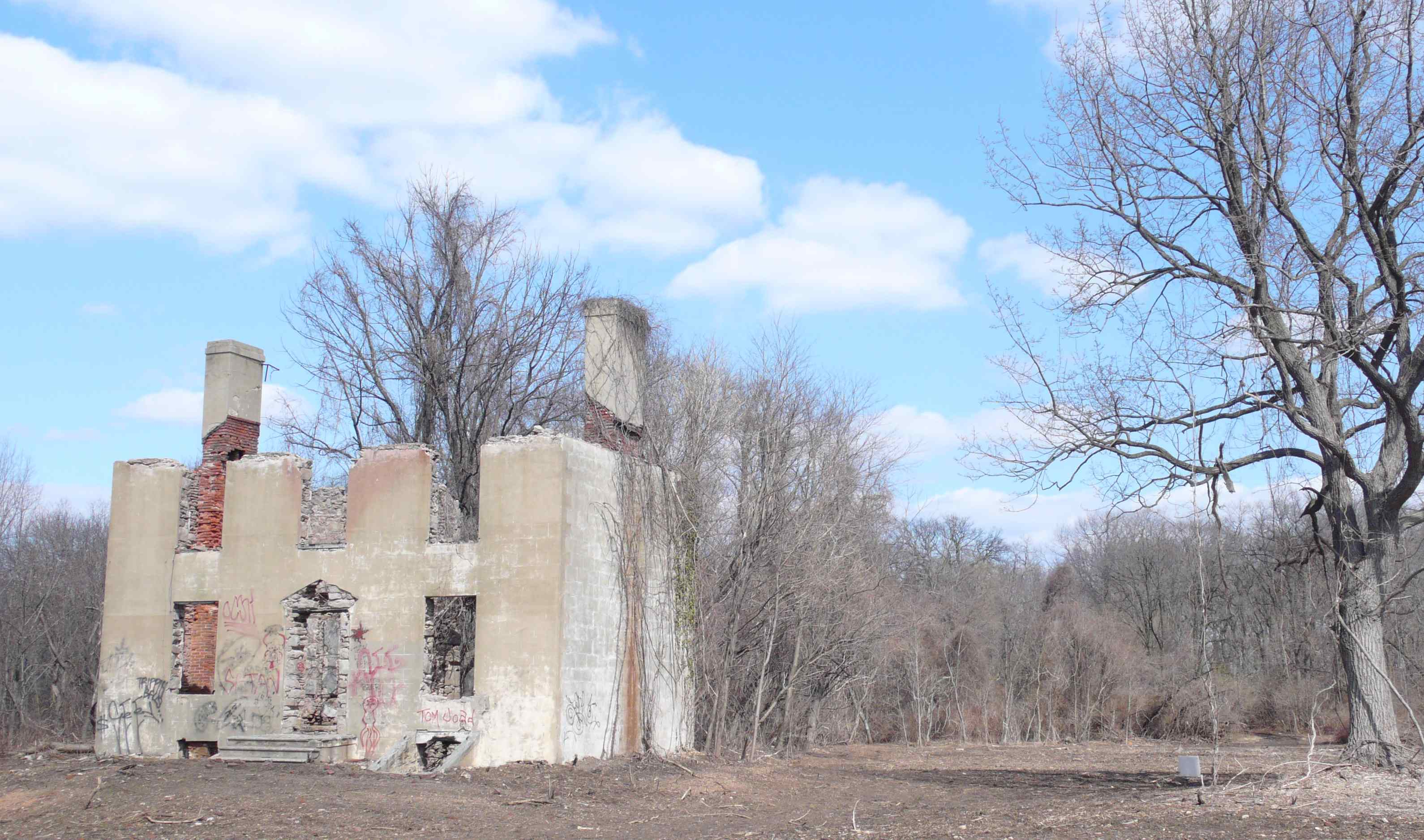
The Cliffs, south view, 2007

The Cliffs house was vandalized in the 1970s and 1980s, possibly due to publicity that the Fairmount Park Commission allowed city officials to live in the park's 45 historic houses rent-free. As a result of the news stories, the Park Commission decided to charge rent, but renters could not be found for some of the houses. Those that were occupied were thereby protected and maintained. The Cliffs was unoccupied from 1970, and due to a lack of funds, neither the Park Commission nor the Shackamaxon Society could maintain it.

== Fire ==
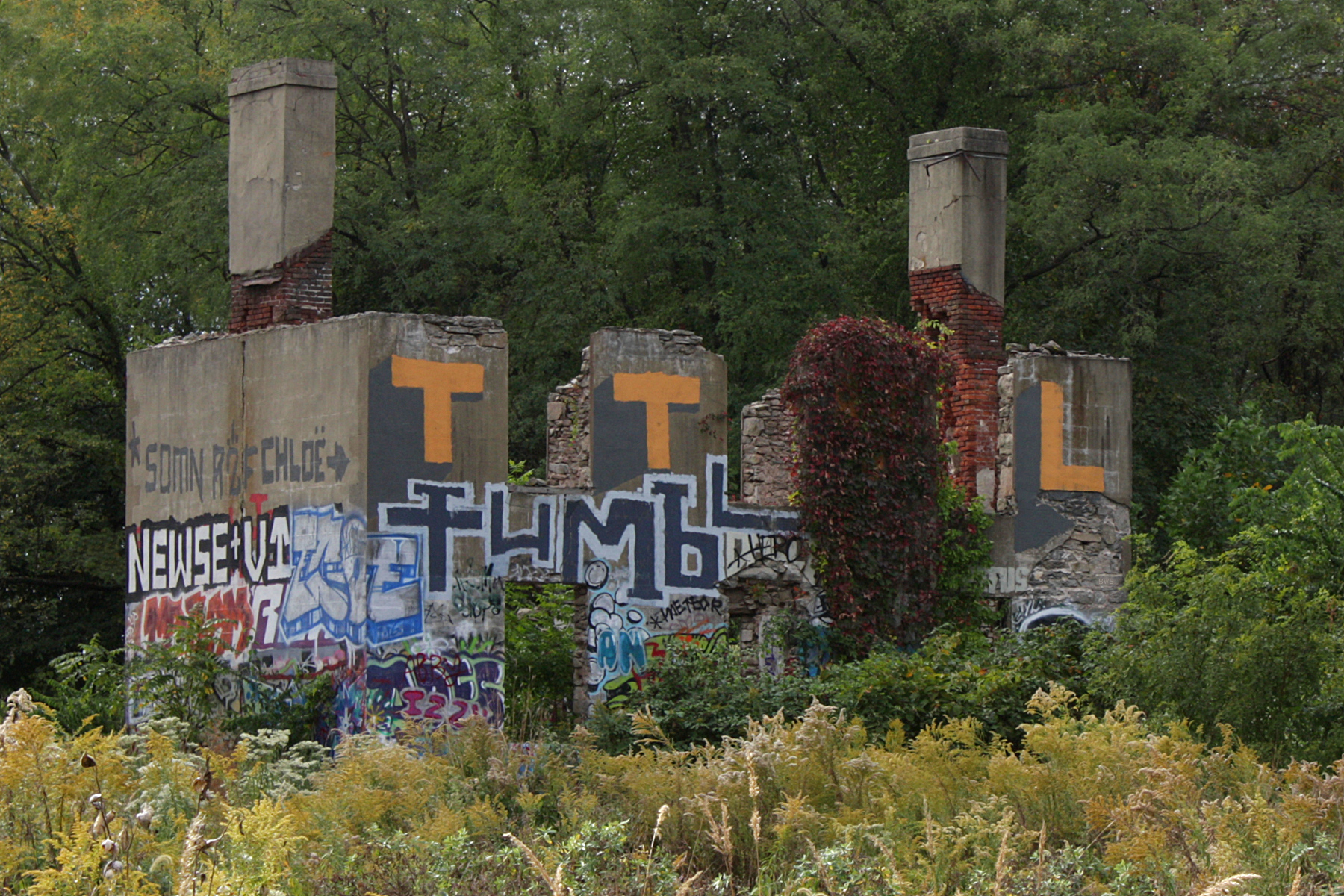
The Cliffs, north view, 2017

The Cliffs burned on February 22, 1986, due to vandalism and arson. Firefighters were unable to extinguish the fire because their heavy trucks sank in the clay earth surrounding the house. The clay had been trucked into the site in order to cover an area near the house used as a dump for refuse from various municipal construction projects.

Today, what remains of the Cliffs is a shell of masonry that can only hint at its history and former glory. It is visible from the Schuylkill Expressway and the West River Drive just north of the Girard Avenue bridge in the winter months when the foliage has dropped from the trees.

== See also ==
- List of houses in Fairmount Park
- List of Registered Historic Places in Philadelphia, Pennsylvania
