= Clingstone =

House in Rhode Island, US

Coordinates: 41°28′55.6″N 71°21′11.5″W

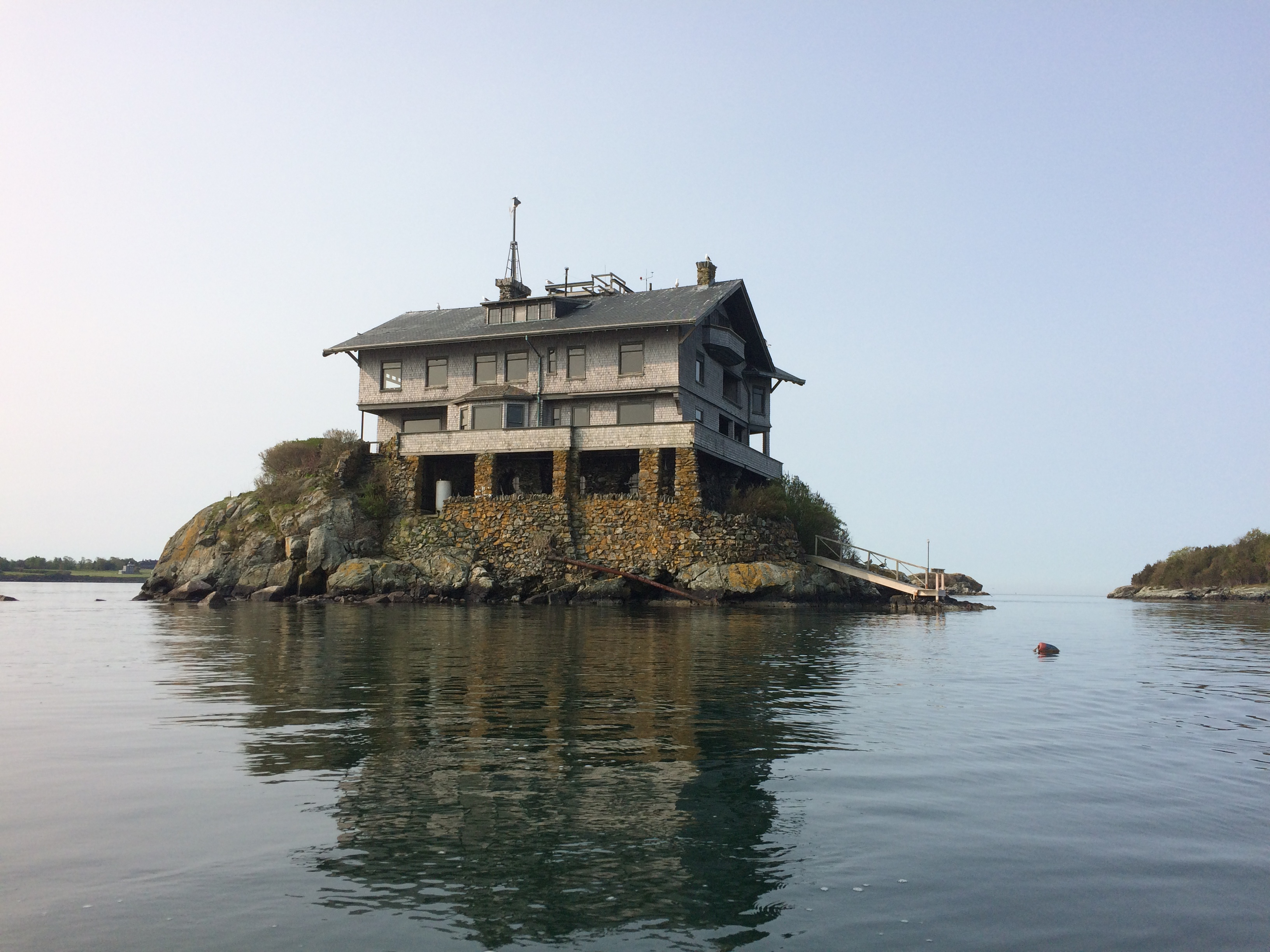
North-northwest view from the water of Clingstone.

Clingstone is a house built in 1905, perched atop a small, rocky island in an island group called "The Dumplings" in Narragansett Bay, near Jamestown, Rhode Island.

== Architecture ==
The dwelling, designed by Philadelphia socialite J. S. Lovering Wharton and artist William Trost Richards, is a three-story 23-room 10,000-square-foot shingle-style cottage. The structural system of heavy mill-type framing was designed to withstand hurricane-force winds. The name "Clingstone" was suggested by a remark that it was "a peach of a house". In August 2010 the interior was documented in a series of panoramic photographs.

Film director Wes Anderson modeled the house from Moonrise Kingdom after Clingstone, specifically the interior shingles.

== Owners ==
The original owner, a nephew of industrialist Joseph Wharton, built the house in response to the government condemning his earlier summer home in order to build Fort Wetherill. Wharton summered there until his death in 1931. Although little damaged by a hurricane in 1938, the residence was still vacant at the time of his wife's death in 1957 until it was purchased in 1961 by Boston architect Henry Wood. Wood, a distant cousin of the Philadelphia Whartons, was able to purchase the property for $3,600, the amount owed in back taxes. The house is known by locals as "The House on a Rock".
