= Deborah Fisher Wharton =

American minister, suffragist, social reformer

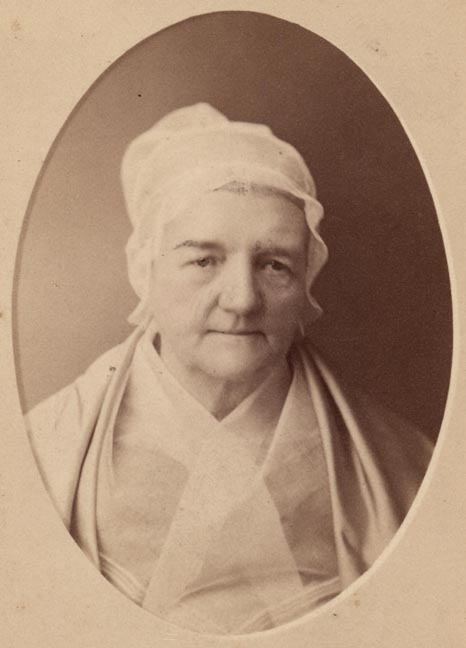
- Deborah Fisher Wharton
- Born: Deborah Fisher; 1795
- Died: 1888 (aged 92–93); Philadelphia, Pennsylvania, U.S.
- Occupations: Educator, Suffragist
- Spouse: William Wharton
- Children: Hannah, Rodman, Sarah, Charles Wm, Joseph, Mary, William, Samuel (d. 1843), Anna, Esther

Deborah Fisher Wharton (1795–1888) was an American Quaker minister, suffragist, social reformer and proponent of women's rights. She was one of a small group of dedicated Quakers who founded Swarthmore College along with her industrialist son, Joseph Wharton. She was a contemporary and friend of Lucretia Mott and had many of Mott's sympathies but did not actively pursue the women's rights cause, rather she was a proponent of liberal Quaker spirituality.

== Early years ==
Deborah Fisher was born into a wealthy Philadelphia Quaker family. Her grandfather was Joshua Fisher, who was involved in early transatlantic trade and started the first packet line of ships regularly carrying goods between Philadelphia and London. Her father was Samuel R Fisher, who took on the shipping business and a large mercantile business in downtown Philadelphia. Her mother was Hannah Rodman, of a Quaker family from Newport, RI, also associated with shipping. She was a descendant of Thomas Cornell.

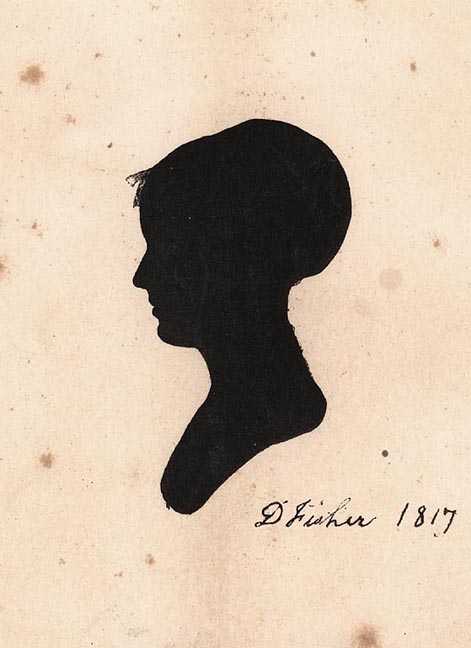
Deborah Fisher Wharton, in 1817 the year she was married.

== Family, estate ==
Fisher grew up in downtown Philadelphia at 110 S Front Street. The neighborhood was busy and wealthy, and she remembered seeing famous neighbors including George Washington stroll along the street. The family enjoyed the countryside and often visited their country estate called "The Cliffs" several miles north of Philadelphia on the Schuylkill River.

== Marriage ==
As a young woman Fisher was pious and interested in the cause of equal education and treatment of women. She married William Wharton in 1817 and together they pursued their interest in Quaker spirituality and simplicity, becoming part of the Hicksite Quaker movement. The Hicksite Friends favored simplicity and directness in their daily lives, contrasting with the more "worldly" urban (Orthodox) Quakers. In this respect the Fishers and Whartons stood out because they were wealthy and urban, but were nostalgic about living the farming life. Deborah's father Samuel bought a house at 336 Spruce Street in downtown Philadelphia as a wedding gift. Deborah raised her family in the house and lived there the rest of her life.

== Religious and social causes ==
Deborah and William and were involved in Quaker Meeting affairs including many committees. Deborah was recognized by their Meeting at Ninth and Spruce Streets as a minister. She was involved in many causes, including helping the Indians of upper New York state, the anti-slavery movement, and education of children.

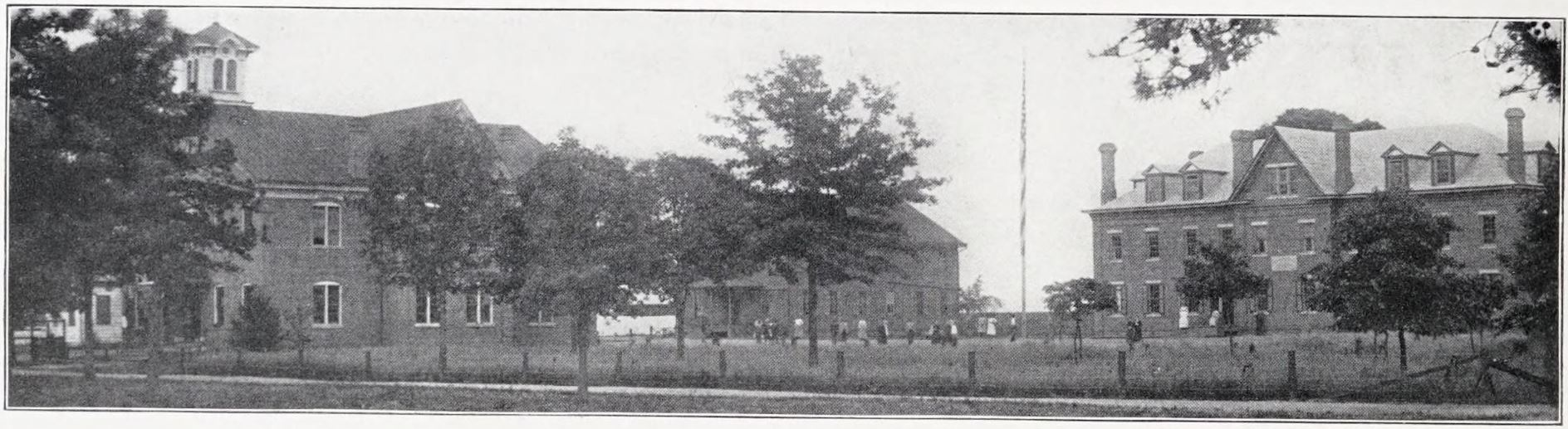
Schofield Normal and Industrial School in Aiken, South Carolina (Deborah F. Wharton Industrial Hall on the right)

She defended Indians' rights in Washington DC, and visited their reservations. Deborah and William successfully petitioned the city of Philadelphia to provide free education for blacks. William became one of the first directors of the Public Schools of Philadelphia and served in that capacity for twenty years.

== Bellevue ==
William and Deborah received a gift of the Bellevue estate from his father Charles Wharton in 1834, the year that her father died. It was a farm near the Cliffs estate that she had grown up to love. The Whartons and their children spent many happy summers at Bellevue, where they enjoyed the vegetable gardens, horse-drawn carriage trips and the cool of the nearby Schuylkill River.

== Newport, Rhode Island ==
Wharton's mother, Hannah Rodman Fisher, came from a long line of Quaker families from Rhode Island and Massachusetts. During the Revolution years, the Narragansett Bay area became a battleground between the British and the Americans allied with the French, and the Newport economy suffered. After the war, Hannah Rodman married Samuel R Fisher of Philadelphia and raised her family there. Although Deborah was a Philadelphian, she made the trip back to Newport many times, in later years with her children and grandchildren.

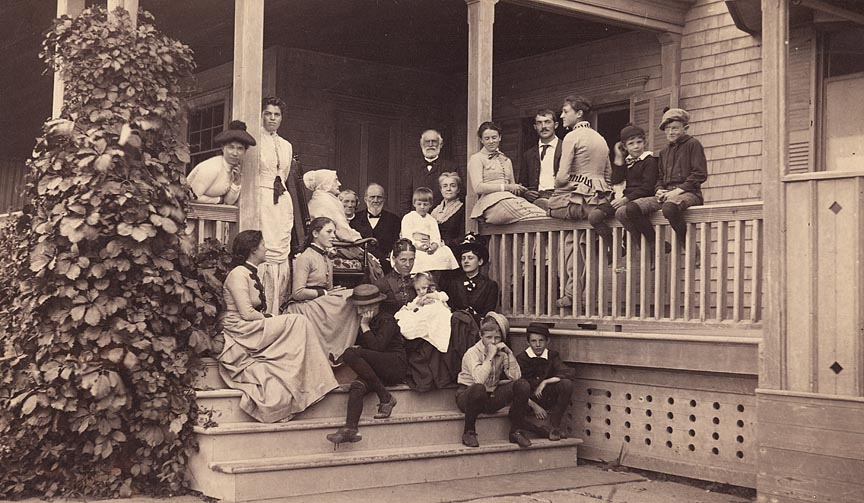
A Newport family gathering in 1884. Deborah Fisher Wharton with her daughter Esther F.W. Smith and family on front porch steps of Esther and Ben Smith's summer house on Newport waterfront. Deborah is older woman sitting with white bonnet. Esther sits by post with Esther Hallowell on lap. Standing behind her is husband Benjamin R Smith. Anna Smith (Wood) leans against post. Next is William Wharton Smith, and sitting on rail, Anna Wharton (Morris), and far right, Edward Wanton Smith. Esther Morton Smith stands by left post. Behind Deborah are Robert and Hannah Haydock, parents of Sally Hallowell, with baby Susan on lap, sitting on step behind her 3 boys. Leaning on railing at left is Evelyn Meyer. Just below Deborah is Anna Hallowell and Polly Wharton against the post. Joanna Wharton (Lippincott) is sitting on upper step behind 2 boys.

== Education and Swarthmore ==
Like many women of her time, Deborah Fisher Wharton was kept at home by her duties as mistress of a large household and mother of ten children. But like most Quaker women of the time, she was especially interested in education. Deborah, along with her industrialist son, Joseph Wharton, together with a small group of other Hicksite Quakers from New York City, Philadelphia, and Baltimore was a founder of Swarthmore College, one of the first coeducational colleges in the country, and served on the original Board of Managers.

Deborah Fisher Wharton's family prospered. Her daughter Esther married Benjamin R. Smith, the son of educator Daniel B Smith of Philadelphia. Fisher's son, Joseph Wharton, became renowned for building a large business empire that included refining zinc, nickel, and iron.

== Selected works ==
- (1837) An epistle from the Yearly Meeting of Women Friends, held in Philadelphia, by adjournments, from the tenth to the fifteenth of the Fourth Month, inclusive, 1837 : to the Quarterly, Monthly, and Preparative Meetings, within its limits
- (1838) An epistle from the Yearly Meeting of Women Friends, held in Philadelphia, by adjournments from the ninth to the fourteenth of the Fourth Month inclusive, 1838 : to the Quarterly, Monthly, and Preparative Meetings, within its limits
- (1840) Extracts from the minutes of the Yearly Meeting of Women Friends, held in Philadelphia, by adjournments, from the eleventh of the fifth month, to the fifteenth of the same, inclusive, 1840
