= Theodor Fleitmann =

German chemist and entrepreneur

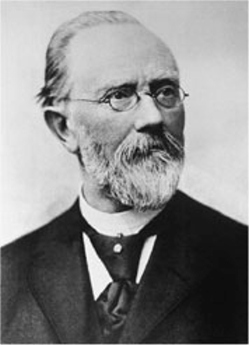
Portrait of Theodor Fleitmann

Franz Friedrich Theodor Fleitmann (August 20, 1828 in Schwerte - October 25, 1904 in Iserlohn) was a German chemist and entrepreneur.

== Family ==
Fleitmann was the son of the businessman Theodor Friedrich Fleitmann (1796-1860). His maternal grandparents were members of the Duisberg and Overweg merchant families from Iserlohn. In Elberfeld in 1856 he married Maria Winkhaus (1838-1919), the daughter of the Elberfeld silk manufacturer Friedrich Winkhaus (1791-1854). The marriage resulted in three sons and two daughters, including Richard Fleitmann (1860–1923), later General Director of United German Nickel Works in Schwerte.

== Life ==
After attending the provincial trade school in Hagen, he began to study chemistry in 1845. He studied in Gießen and Berlin. From 1849 to 1851 Fleitmann was the private assistant of Justus von Liebig. In 1850 he was awarded a doctorate in natural sciences.

For health reasons, he gave up his university career in 1851 and moved to Iserlohn. There he managed the nickel smelter Neusilberwarenfabrik Herbers, Witte & Co.. In 1861, Fleitmann acquired the nickel works and together with Heinrich Witte founded the Nickel- und Kobaltfabrik Fleitmann & Witte on the Iserlohner Heath in Iserlohn, which produced blanks for the first German nickel coin in 1871 that were manufactured in the German Empire. A year earlier, the production facility had been relocated to Schwerte. The nickel coins became known as the Fleitmännchen.

In 1872 Joseph Wharton sent to an exhibition in Vienna a sample of malleable nickel, produced so it seemed by "removing the oxygen from the fluid nickel by the use of carbon". The sample was inspected by Fleitmann, who doubted Wharton's explanation and resolved to make experiments of his own. In 1877 Fleitmann succeeded in making nickel rollable and forgeable. In 1879 with U.S. patent 217,523, he "discovered and patented the addition to the molten nickel before casting of metallic magnesium in amounts of from 0.05 to 0.125 per cent, and later amended this practice to use a magnesium-nickel alloy instead." Another invention was the plating of thin nickel sheet on steel sheet. With his inventions he created the basis for the later nickel industry.

In 1898, Theodor Fleitmann was made an honorary citizen of the city of Iserlohn. Three years later he withdrew from the company, which had grown to over 1,000 employees, and passed it on to his sons Richard (1860-1923) and Theodor Fleitmann (1861-1945). In 1901 the Technische Hochschule Charlottenburg awarded him an honorary doctorate. He was a member of the Society of German Natural Scientists and Doctors.

Theodor Fleitmann died of a stroke at the age of 76. The grave of his family at the Main Cemetery Iserlohn is under monument protection.

== Works ==
- Theodor Fleitmann (1927). The position of beryllium and magnesium in the periodic system. Bonn.

== Literature ==
- Paul Grote (1961). "Fleitmann, Franz Friedrich Theodor". Neue Deutsche Biographie (in German). Vol. 5. Berlin: Duncker & Humblot. pp. 237–237. (116613173.html full text online).
- Hermann Holtmeier (1997). Distinctive heads from the Märkisches Kreis. Iserlohn: Hans-Herbert Mönnig Verlag. ISBN 3-922885-89-6.
- H. Kraas (1965). "Pedigree of the royal. Prussia. Commercial Council Dr. phil. et Dr. Ing. E. h. Franz Friedr. Theodor Fleitmann". The Märker. Vol. 14. p. 245.
- Wilhelm Schulte (1960). "Theodor Fleitmann - The career of the founder of the nickel industry". The Märker. Vol. 9. p. 247.
- Wilhelm Schulte (1962). "Theodor Fleitmann (1828–1904)". Rheinish-Westphalian economic biographies. Vol. 8. Münster: Aschendorff. pp. 56–74.
