= Bellevue Mansion =

Historic country house in North Philadelphia

Coordinates: 40.0058°N 75.1742°W

Bellevue Mansion was a historic country house in North Philadelphia. The site on which it stood is now between North Marston and North Etting Streets, near 29th Street and Allegheny Avenue.

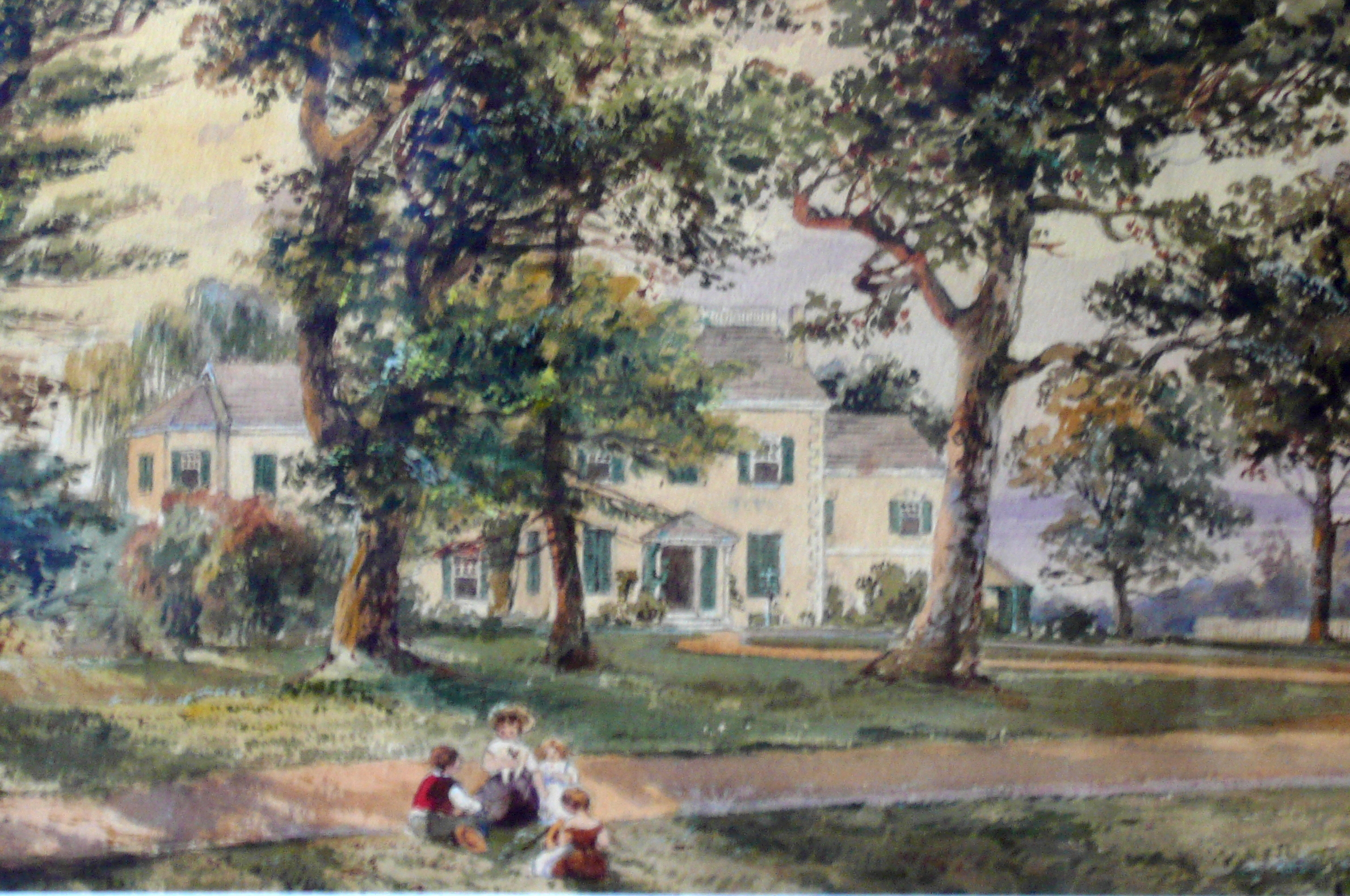
Bellevue Mansion, looking south from Nicetown Lane in 1856. Painting by Edmund Darch Lewis.

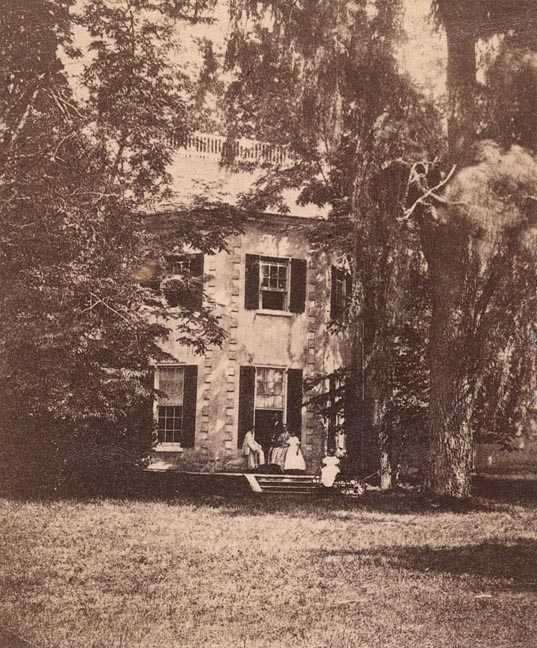
Bellevue Mansion in 1858

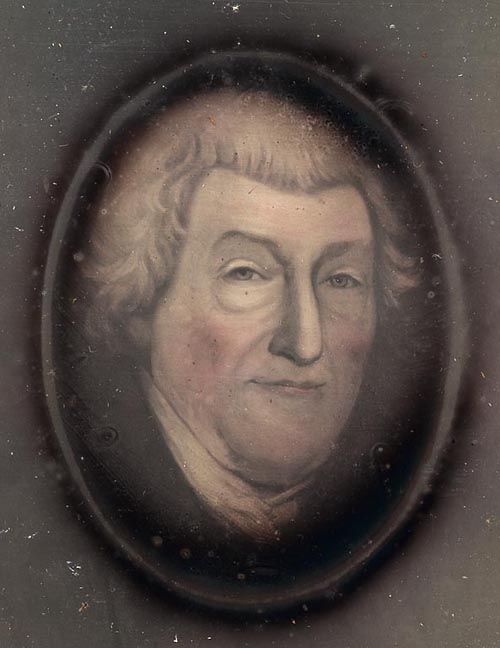
Charles Wharton purchased Bellevue in 1802

Bellevue was purchased from Thomas Ketland and his wife Elizabeth as a country estate in 1802 by Philadelphia merchant Charles Wharton (1743–1838), grandfather of industrialist Joseph Wharton. It was located about 3 miles (4.8 km) northwest of Philadelphia, just below the heights of Germantown.

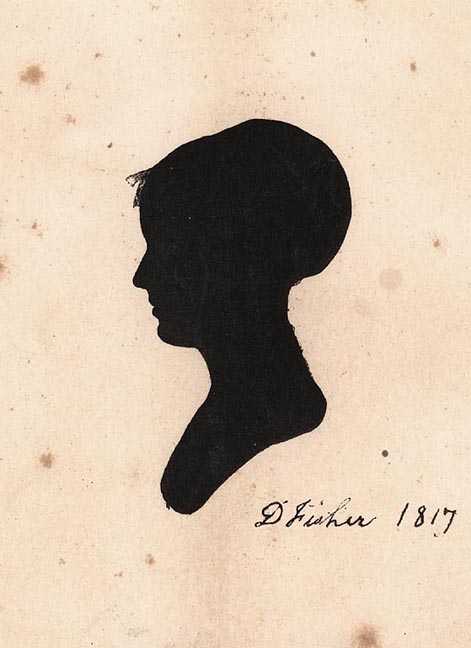
Deborah Fisher Wharton, daughter of Samuel R. Fisher, in the year she was married.

Bellevue remained in the Wharton family for more than 60 years. In 1834 Charles Wharton gave the estate to his son William (1790–1856), who resided there in the summer with his wife Deborah Fisher Wharton for two decades raising their family. It was a working farm of 106 acres (0.43 km^{2}), situated in rolling hills, with house, barn, sheds, vegetable gardens, orchards, fields, and farm animals. The manor house overlooked a small valley and brook that flowed into the Schuylkill River. Large willows, sycamores, and oaks dominated the house and landscape. Servants, mostly Irish, assisted with housekeeping and hired hands worked the fields and maintained the farm animals. The estate was surrounded by woods and estates of other wealthy Philadelphians.

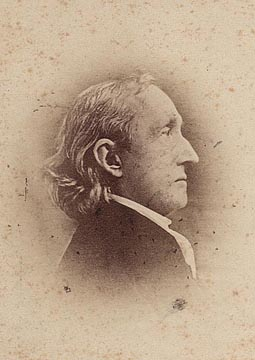
William Wharton, ~1840

Bellevue Mansion was large and roomy, constructed in stone, with two stories, basement, and widow's walk on the roof. Originally constructed by an Englishman who enjoyed dancing, it contained a large ballroom, used by the Wharton family as a game room. The family visited Bellevue often, entertaining many guests young and old. Paralleling the creek nearby was Nicetown Lane, leading about a half mile down to the Schuylkill River.

William and Deborah were heavily involved in religious affairs of their Quaker Meeting and in the period 1825 to 1840 depended on Bellevue with its housemistress to keep their children occupied during the summer months. Joseph Wharton and his brother Charles and their siblings often walked down Nicetown Lane to the Schuylkill River, where they cooled off during the summer.

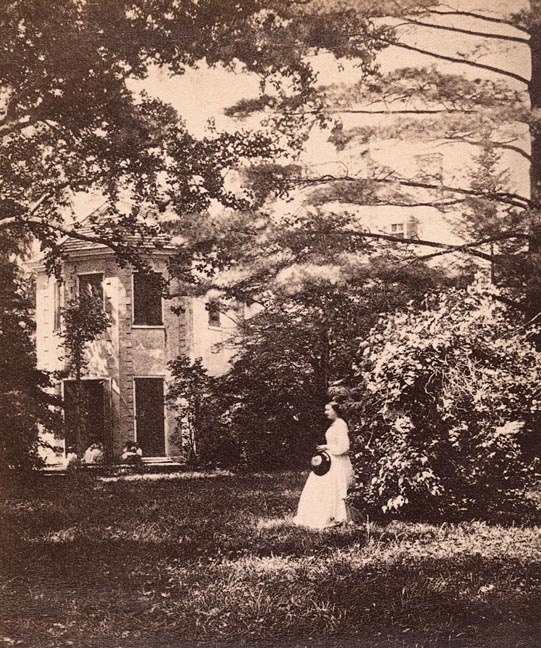
Bellevue Mansion from the east. Anna Wharton stands in the foreground.

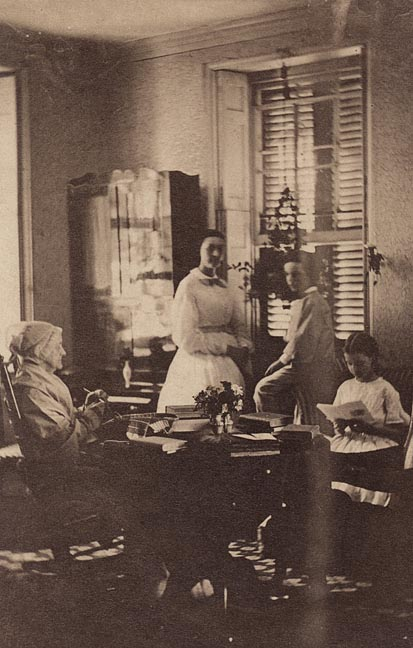
Interior of Bellevue Mansion, 1858. Deborah Fisher Wharton sitting at left. Anna Wharton, standing, died in 1863 at 29 of tuberculosis. Mary Wharton Thurston's children, William and Esther (Hetty), orphaned in 1861, at right.

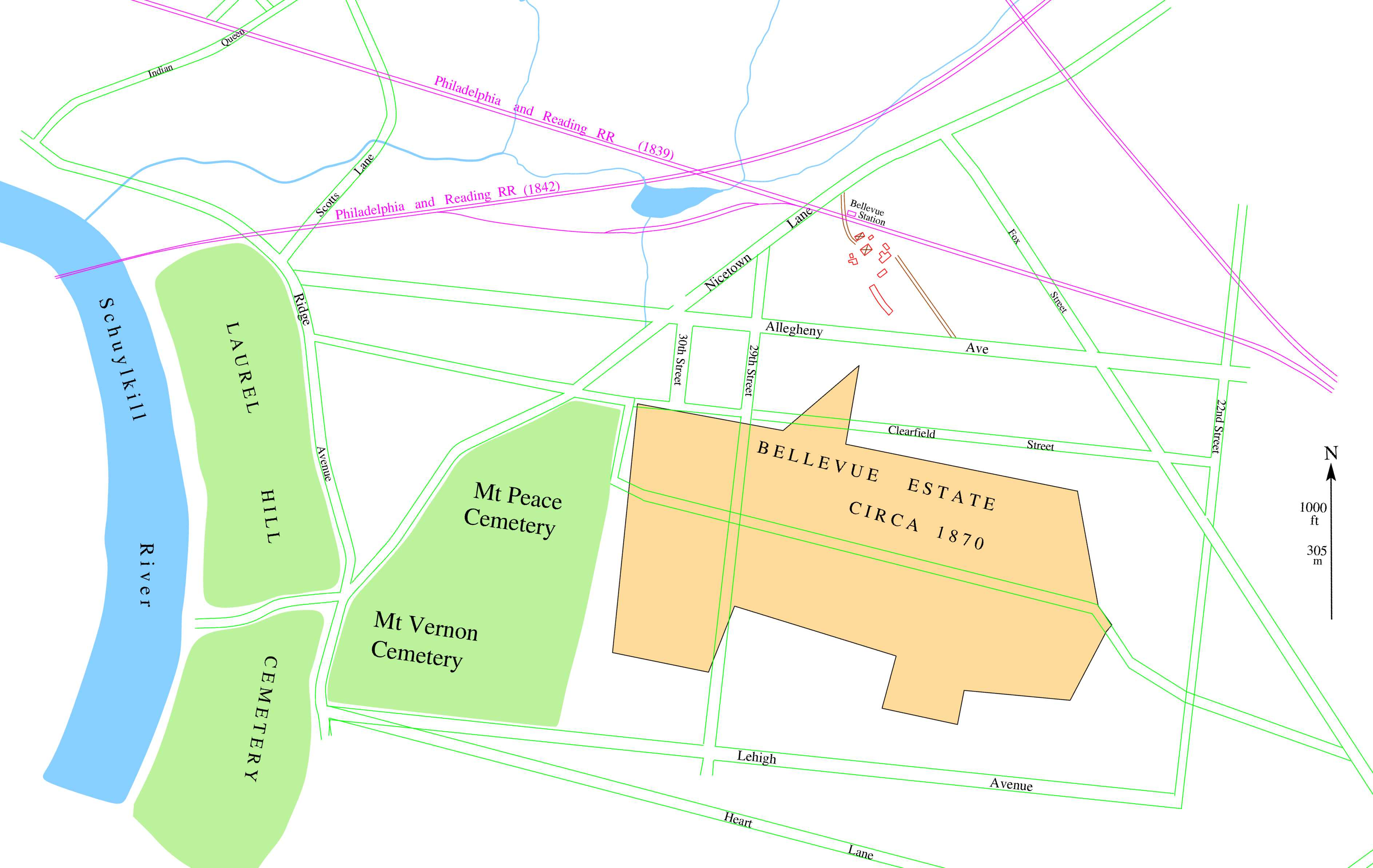
Map of the Bellevue Estate in 1870. Much of the estate near the train tracks had been sold, and some additional lots were purchased by the family south of Lamb Tavern Road.

Starting in the 1840s, Bellevue was threatened by local development. In 1839, the Reading Railroad built its main line from Philadelphia to Norristown and north to Reading. The line ran about 30 yards (27 m) from the mansion on the north. The surrounding land, between Germantown and the city limits of Philadelphia, today's North Philadelphia, was relatively undeveloped, and in the period 1850 to 1880 entrepreneurs bought up many of the old estates for industrial sites and housing developments. To the younger generation of that time, the railroads represented progress, allowing anyone to travel quickly and boosting the economy of the region. This was especially true for Joseph Wharton and his siblings, who accepted such worldly improvements, and became immersed in the industrial economy. The trains were convenient, with a "Bellevue" station within a short walk of the mansion. But they also carried huge loads of coal, thundering by the house at inconvenient times, and the constant noise was annoying for guests staying at Bellevue. Although still a beautiful estate, its utility as a respite from city life would be limited.

In 1854, Philadelphia expanded its borders to include the surrounding suburbs, and after the Civil War its population swelled to several hundred thousand. By 1870 the Centennial Exposition was upcoming, and Philadelphia was rapidly changing. It was suffering from a water crisis because it required more water, but there was no appropriate method for water purification and the Delaware and Schuylkill rivers were heavily polluted. Philadelphia's typhoid fever rate was among the highest in the nation, and most well-to-do families drank bottled spring water.

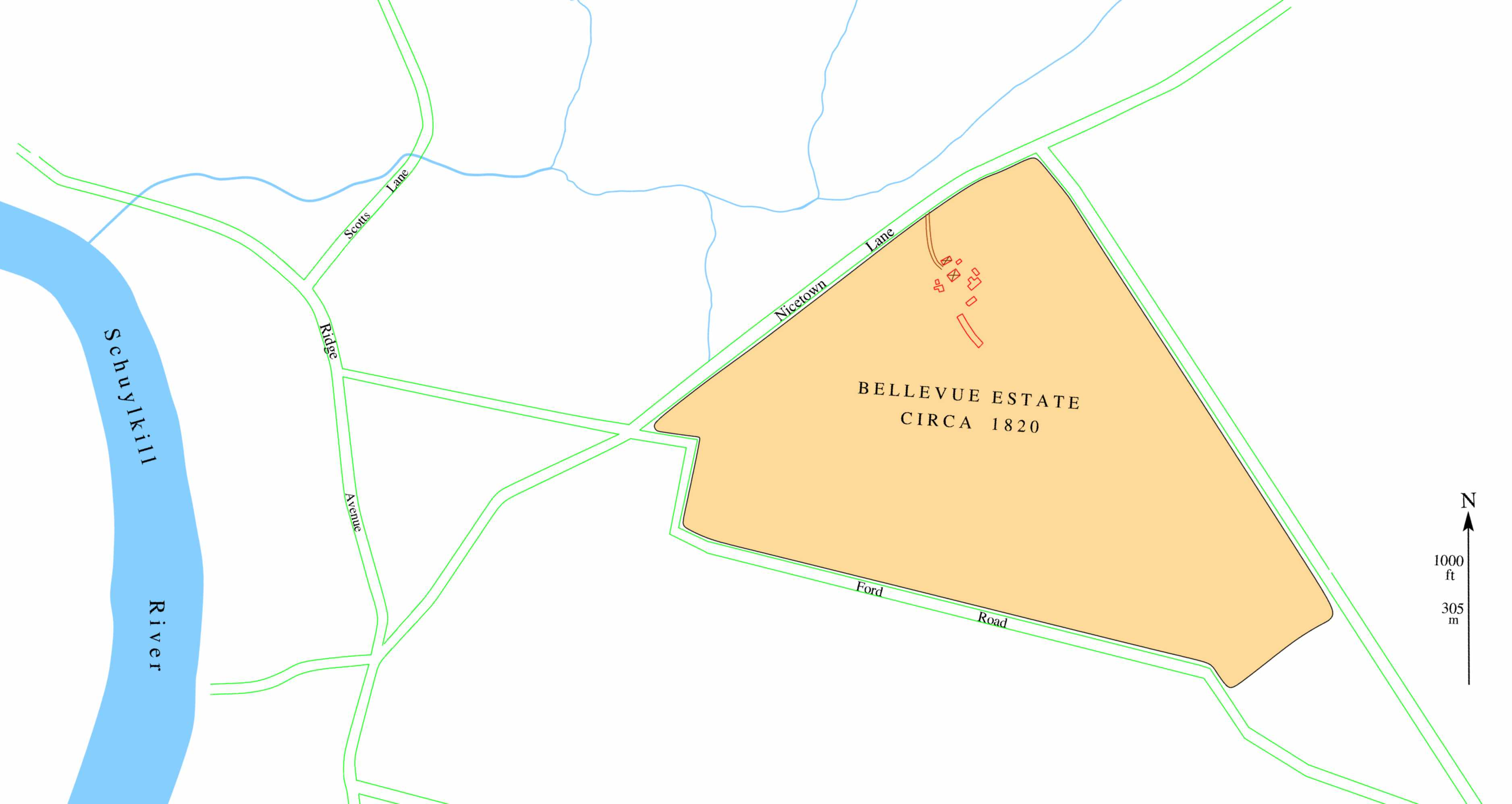
Map of the Bellevue Estate in 1820, overlooking a small valley in which a brook flowed from Germantown down into the Schuylkill River. The family owned most of the land between Nicetown Lane and Ford Road.

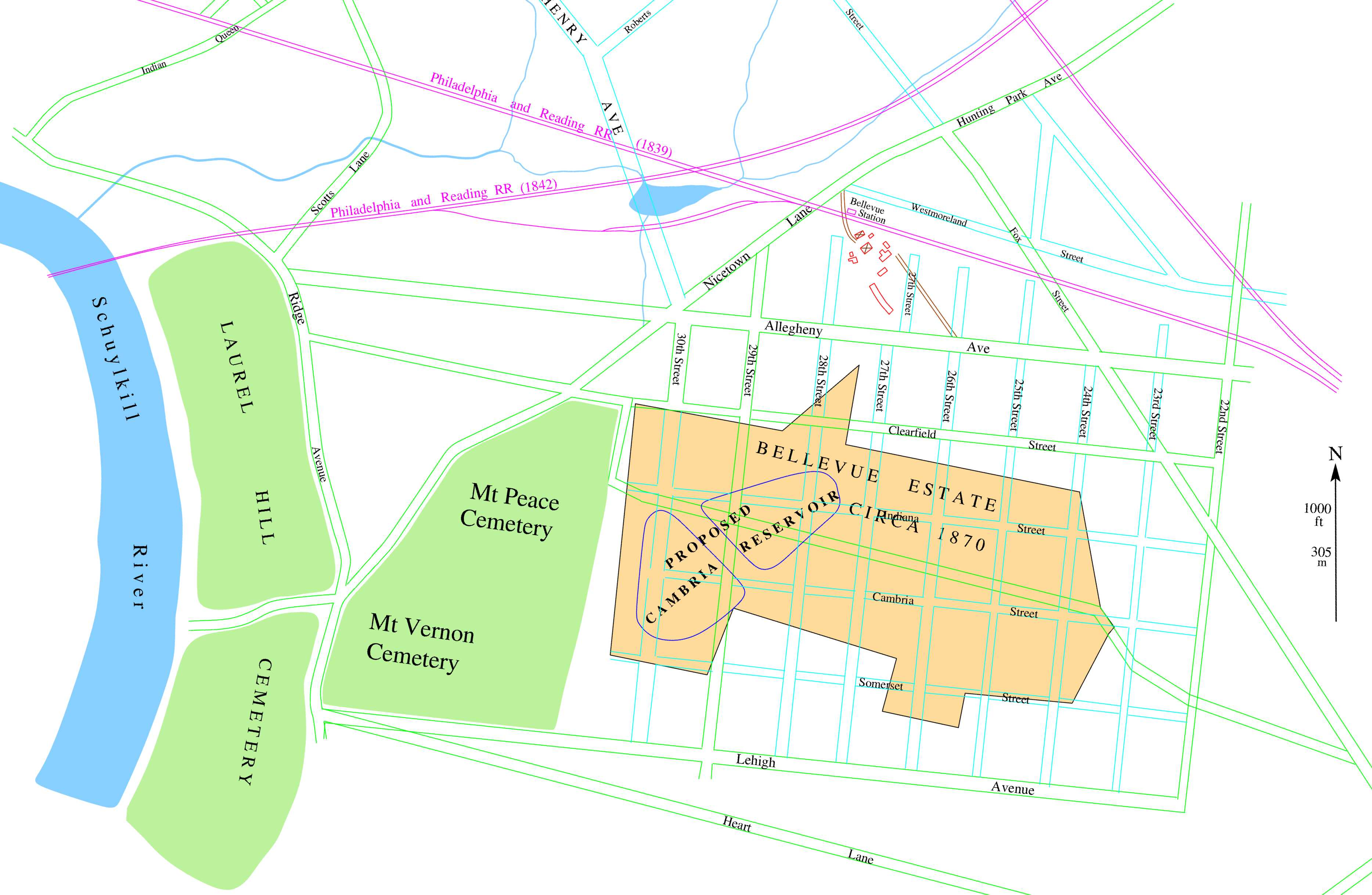
Map of the Bellevue Estate in 1895. The City of Philadelphia condemned what was left of the Wharton Estate for the "Cambria Reservoir". Newly planned streets in light blue. The house sat between 27th and 28th Streets, just north of Allegheny Ave.

Although Bellevue had been threatened since the 1840s by the proximity of the nearby railroads, it was now threatened more directly. In the 1870s the entire Bellevue estate, then owned by Joseph Wharton and his siblings, along with several other estates nearby that had been annexed into the city, was threatened with condemnation by the city for the construction of the proposed Cambria Reservoir to hold potable water. The Wharton siblings were angry and frustrated that there seemed no recourse when the city chose their estate on which to build.

Joseph Wharton saw a potential solution to the water problems. He started purchasing land in southern New Jersey in the 1870s, eventually acquiring 150 square miles (390 km^{2}) in the Pinelands, which contained an aquifer replenished by several rivers and lakes. The water from the Pinelands was relatively pure and he planned to export the water to Philadelphia. Wharton suggested that a city-controlled company could develop the necessary water mains and pumps, funded by public purchase of stocks and bonds. There was opposition to the plan by others in Philadelphia and in New Jersey, and eventually a law was passed in New Jersey preventing the export of water.

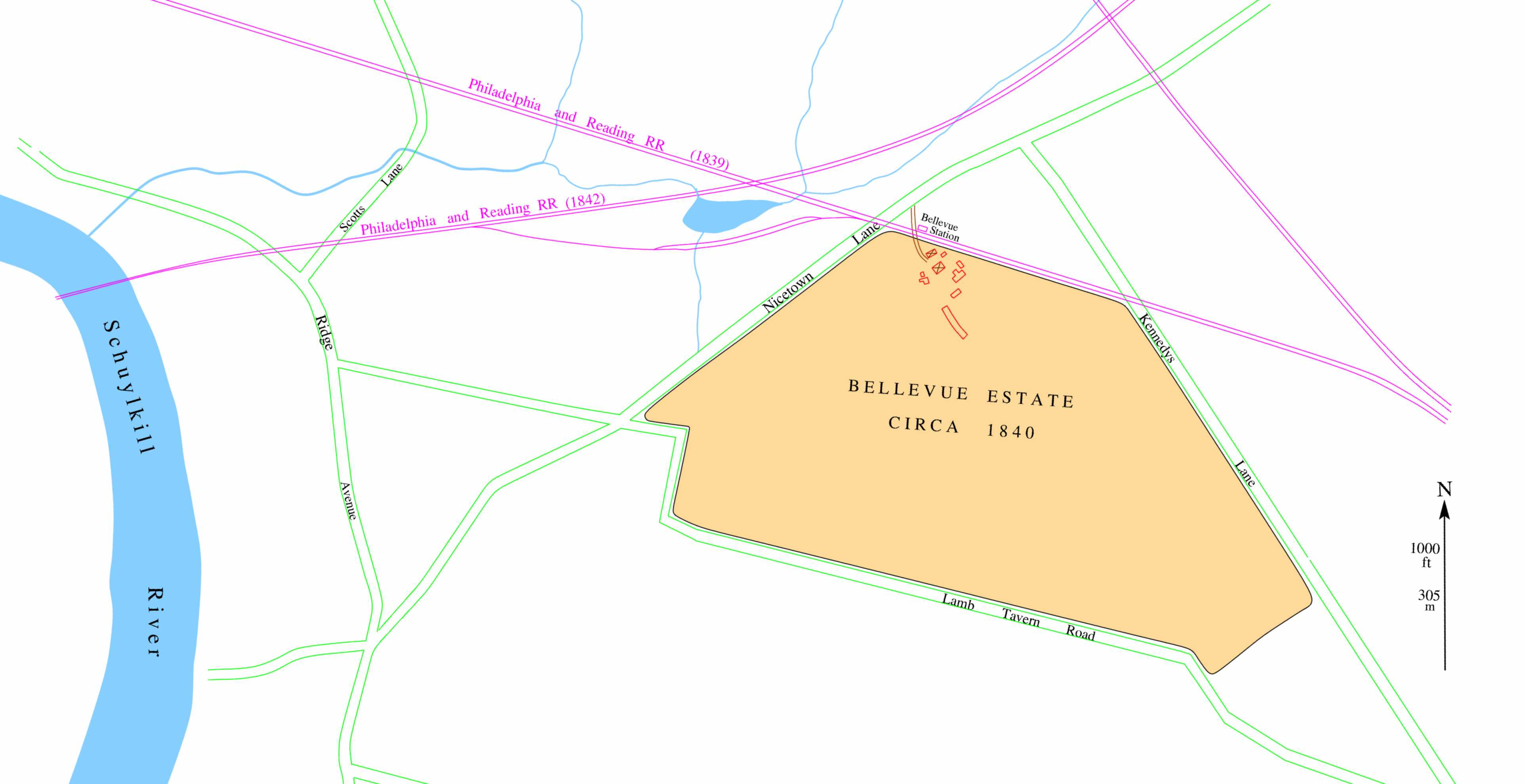
Map of the Bellevue Estate in 1840. The Reading Railroad built its Norristown line 30 yards (27 m) north of Bellevue Mansion, with the Bellevue station nearby. With this progress, the quiet of the estate was doomed and the family began selling off lots near the train right of way. A second rail line, constructed nearby in 1842, carried anthracite coal from northern Pennsylvania to large coal terminal on the Delaware River at Port Richmond.

The Bellevue estate was taken by the city, but the planned reservoir was never constructed, because of local politics and also because by 1890 water could be purified by filtration, obviating the need for an extra reservoir. Instead most of the Bellevue estate was sold to developers. Unmaintained and boarded up, the mansion was used for several decades by the city water department to store pipes and fittings, and was finally demolished in construction of new housing for the newly organized industry nearby in North Philadelphia.

Today, the location of Bellevue Mansion is Etting Square, a small park and playground between N. Marston and N. Etting Streets, just north of Allegheny Avenue in North Philadelphia.

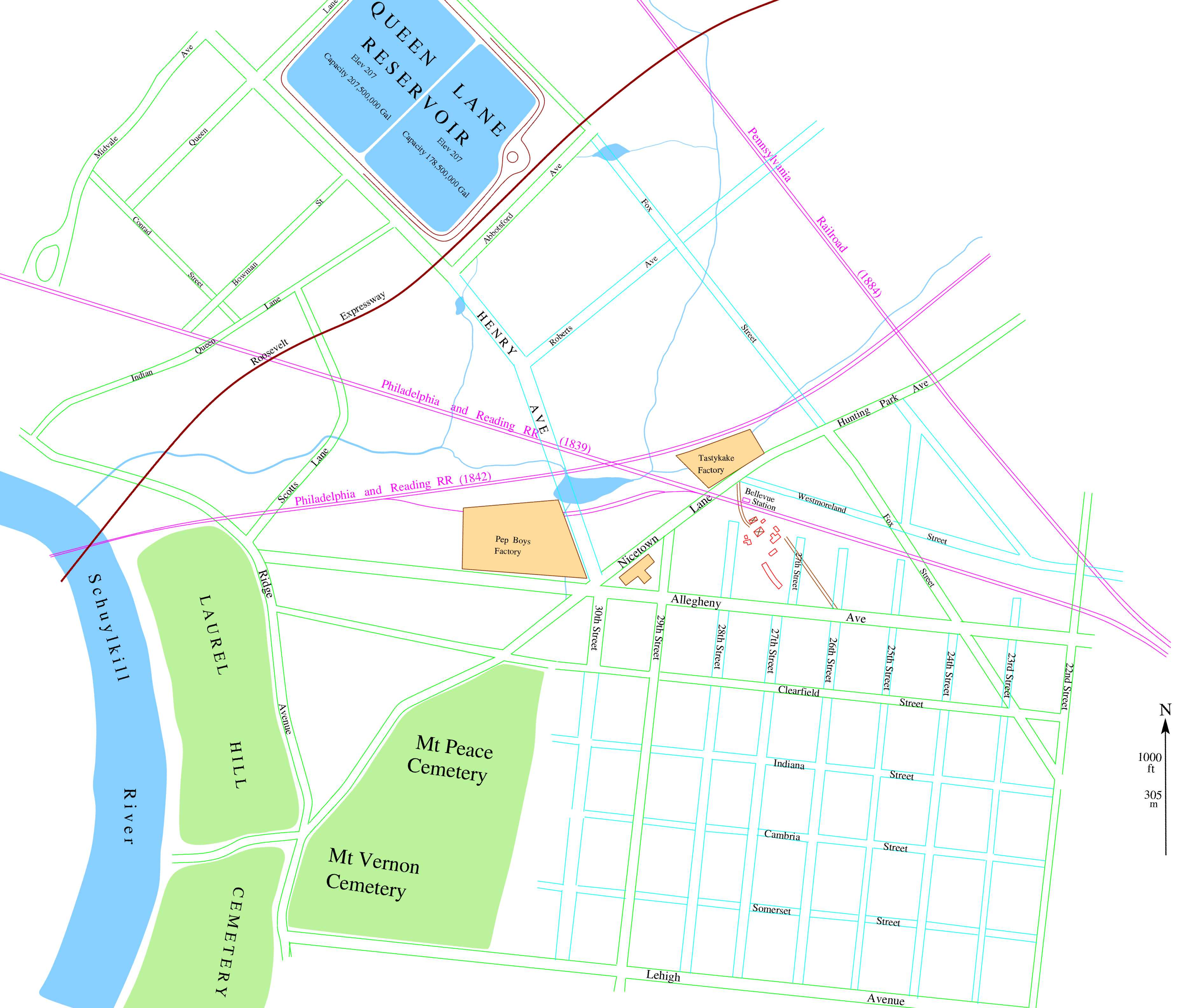
Map of the site of Bellevue Mansion, 1920. Industry sprang up near the rail lines. The Tastykake factory stands across Hunting Park Ave. from where Bellevue Mansion stood, and Pep Boys is just down the street. Roosevelt Expressway, constructed in 1958–1961, is included as a relevant modern landmark.
