= Joshua Fisher (merchant) =

Joshua Fisher (1707 – February 1, 1783) was a prominent Philadelphia merchant involved in transatlantic trade and mapmaking as applied to nautical charts. He made the first nautical chart of the Delaware River and Delaware Bay, and established the first merchant packet line between London and Philadelphia.

== Early years ==
Fisher was born in Sussex County, Delaware, into a Quaker family with historic roots, growing up in Lewes, Delaware. His father, Thomas Fisher (1669–1713), and mother, Margery Maud (1671–1770), were both Quakers, as were his grandparents. Margery Maud was a stepdaughter of Dr. Thomas Wynne. His grandfather, John Fisher, came to America aboard the "Welcome" with William Penn. Fisher was enterprising, and taught himself mathematics and mechanics. He married (July 27, 1733) a neighbor's daughter, Sarah Rowland, the granddaughter of Mary Harworth, an eloquent Friends minister who had also arrived on the "Welcome".

== Establishing a business ==
Fisher settled in Lewes, Delaware, near Cape Henlopen, regularly attending Quaker Meeting. He learned to make hats from animal skins, started a hat-making business, and established an active trade with the local Indians in pelts of beaver and other small animals. He developed a transatlantic trade and sold many pelts to customers in England. In Lewes he opened a large inn and country store, which was frequented by many pilots and ship captains because Lewes was the first port at the mouth of Delaware Bay and a good location to learn about the channel to Philadelphia. Fisher gave the pilots advice about how to navigate Delaware Bay, which was notorious for its many shoals. He was appointed by Thomas Penn to be Deputy Surveyor General of Delaware.

== Family farm ==
Fisher's father Thomas owned a 300-acre (1.2 km^{2}) property that included a farm, and another 500-acre (2.0 km^{2}) property at Cool Spring, west of Lewes, that included a farm house constructed in the Dutch style with a gambrel roof. When his father died in 1713, Fisher inherited the properties, ran them profitably for two decades, and in 1736 sold the Cool Spring property to Rev. James Martin, a pastor of nearby Presbyterian churches, whose descendants held the property for two centuries. In 1980, the Fisher-Martin house was moved to downtown Lewes, where it currently houses the Chamber of Commerce information center.

== Move to Philadelphia ==
In 1746, Fisher sold his store and house in Lewes and moved with his wife and six children to Philadelphia, at first settling in a house on the north side of Walnut St above Front St. Later he built a house at 110 S. Front St. and moved his family there. He had owned slaves on the family farm outside of Lewes and sold them before the move, but later repurchased them and gave them and their descendants their freedom. Fisher also purchased a country estate north of the city overlooking the Schuylkill River from the east, and built a house there in 1753 called "The Cliffs", after his family's ancestral home in Yorkshire, England. The family often stayed at The Cliffs in the summer, enjoying the nearby river.

== Mercantile business ==
Fisher built a warehouse in downtown Philadelphia at the back of the lot at 110 S. Front St where his house stood, and established there a prosperous mercantile business, "Joshua Fisher & Sons" (1762–1783), selling virtually every type of object. Soon after, Fisher established the first packet line of ships to sail regularly between Philadelphia and London, two of the largest cities in the British Empire. Customers were able to order items such as porcelain, silverware, brass pulls for dressers, and every other imaginable type of merchandise from a detailed catalog, and receive their goods within weeks. The business did not advertise much in the local newspapers because it was mainly a wholesale supplier to retail stores. Fisher's descendants still possess well-built Windsor chairs from the packet line.

== Map of Delaware Bay ==
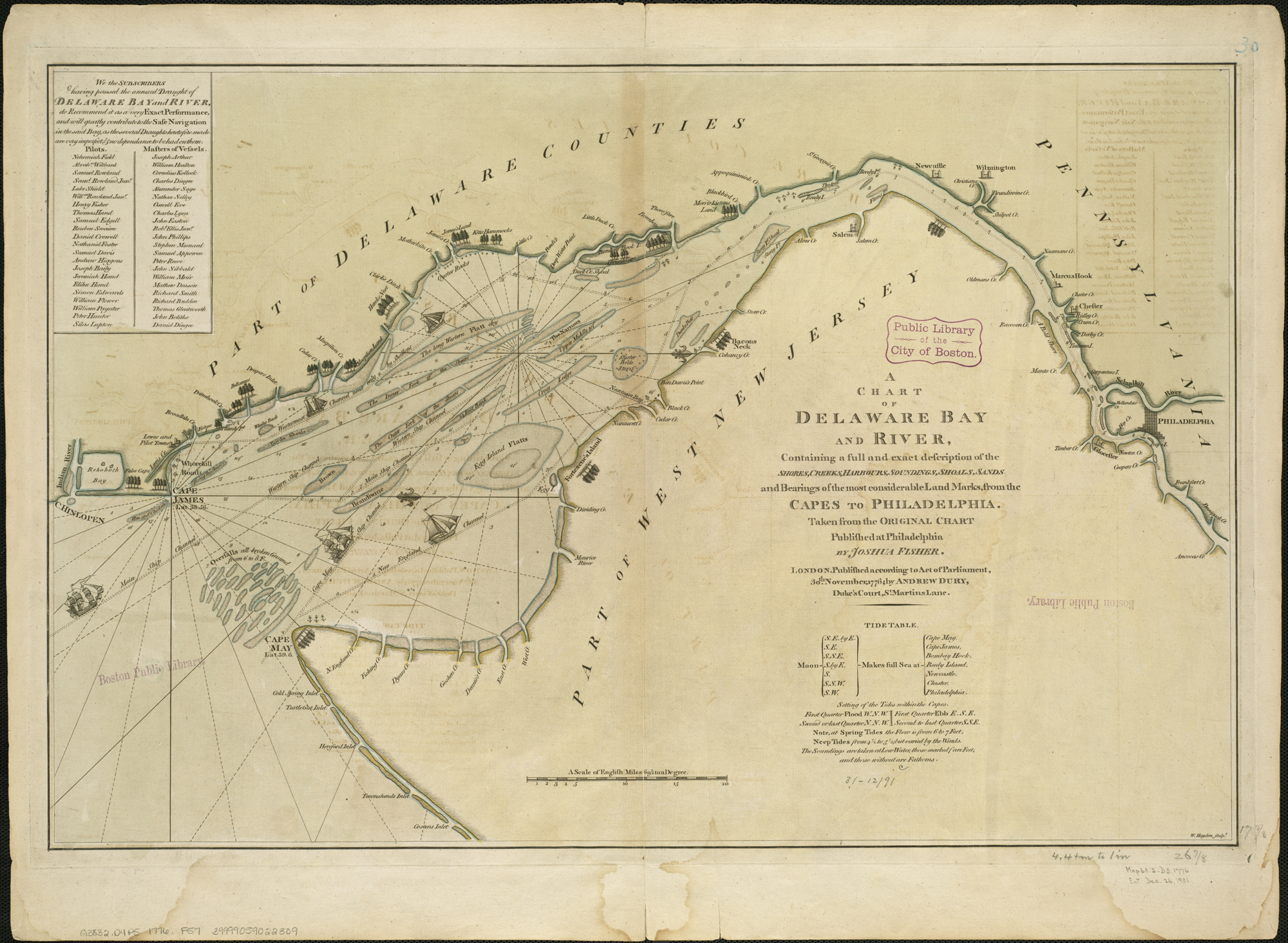
1776 Map of Delaware Bay by Joshua Fisher

Fisher continued his interest in the navigation of the Delaware Bay, and at night studied navigation. He was encouraged in this endeavor by the pilots and ship captains who continued to need accurate information about the shoals and channels of the bay. Over the course of 20 years Fisher developed a detailed map of the Delaware Bay with help from his brother-in-law, Samuel Rowland, and teacher Thomas Godfrey. The chart was very accurate for the day, showing observations of the exact latitude and longitude, and soundings, information about harbors, stream inlets, shoals, and ship channels. The chart was engraved by James Turner, funded by a group of local merchants and ship owners, and printed in 1756 in Philadelphia by printer John Davis.

Fisher was ordered not to publish the map by the Governor, Robert Hunter Morris, because a war appeared likely with France and he was concerned that the map might fall into enemy hands. Fisher sent out copies of the map anyway and explained that the map did not show the full way to Philadelphia, and the complexity of the navigation to Philadelphia would deter the enemy. The map was re-engraved in Philadelphia in 1775, duplicated and published in London in 1776, and widely sold and distributed. It remained the standard map for navigation to Philadelphia for almost a century as it carried the trace of the channel to the docks.

== Revolutionary War and family ==
During the Revolution, much of Fisher's inventory of merchandise was commandeered by the military to support the revolutionary cause, but Fisher was not fully reimbursed for it. In 1779 his son Thomas and a slave worker were taken hostage from Fisher's farm in lower Delaware by the British, and Fisher was obliged to pay a ransom of 100 bullocks. As many Quakers did during the Revolution, he maintained a neutral position with respect to the fledgling country's conflicts, and he and his family suffered as a consequence. In 1777 Fisher's sons were ordered by the authorities to produce their firm's business records but they refused, and since they were Quakers they refused to swear an oath of allegiance. As a consequence sons Thomas, Samuel, Meirs were exiled to Winchester, Virginia along with several other Quakers, and kept under house arrest for a year. Although they were treated somewhat harshly they survived without severe illness, but their brother-in-law Thomas Gilpin and John Hunt died. After evacuation of the British, the group of Quakers were eventually pardoned and allowed to return to Philadelphia by order of George Washington and the Congress.

Fisher's son Samuel continued to show opposition to the revolutionary cause, and in 1779 he and was arrested on the charge of being a Tory on the basis of a letter he sent to his brother Jabez Maud on a ship unable to land in New York Harbor. Samuel exacerbated the situation by not recognizing the authority of the court and was sent to jail for 2 years. Fisher was by then too ill to be taken from his home and the charges against him were dropped. Fisher's sons continued the mercantile business and son Samuel continued the packet line to London, capturing business with catalogs of textiles and manufactured items, and the family continued to be prosperous. Fisher's great-grandson was Joseph Wharton, a prominent industrialist who founded the Wharton School of Business.
