= James Turner (silversmith) =

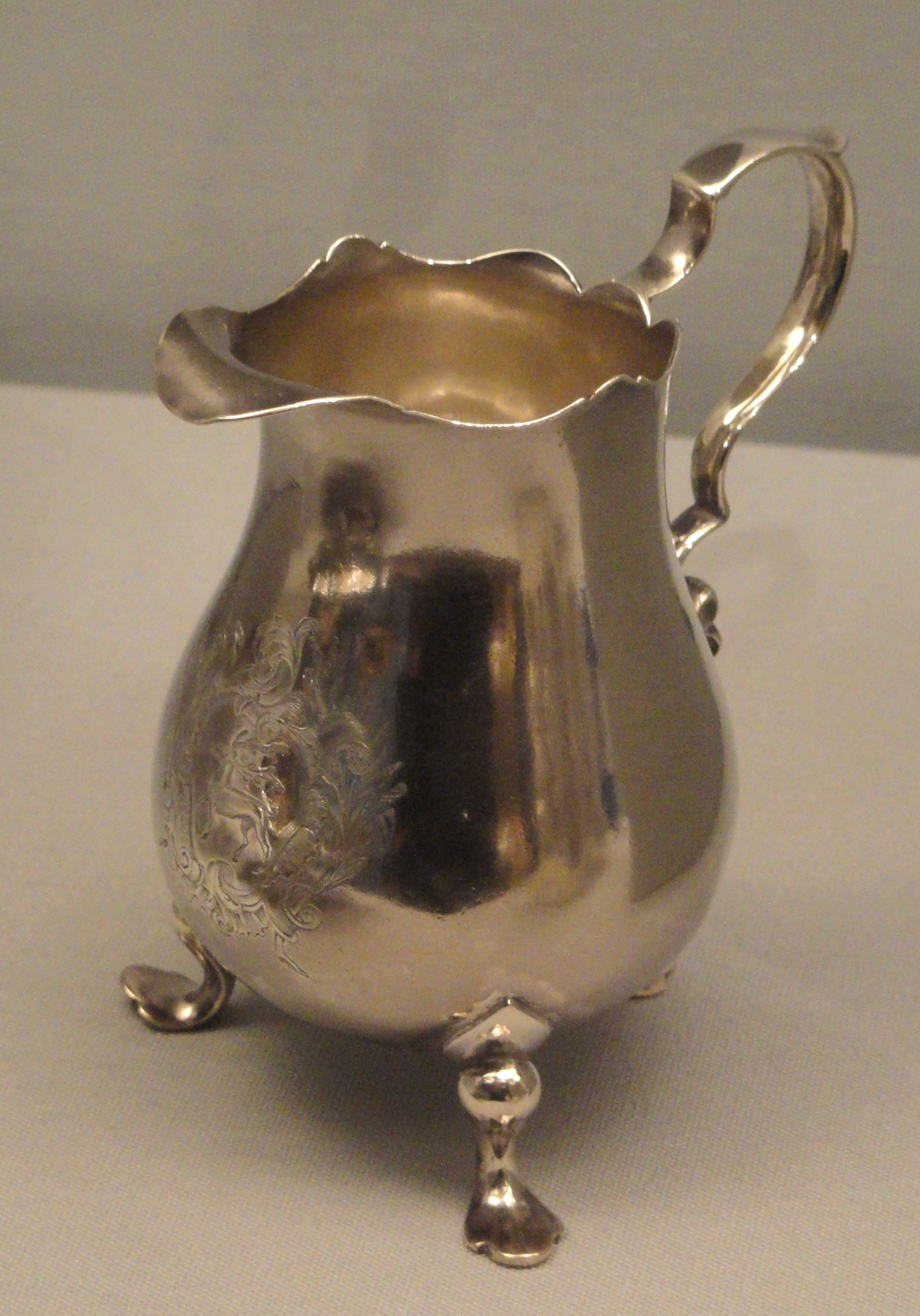
Creampot by James Turner, 1750-1759

James Turner (March 18, 1721 - before December 10, 1759) was a silversmith and engraver from the Thirteen Colonies. He was active in Boston and Philadelphia.

Turner was born in Marblehead, Massachusetts, worked as a silversmith and engraver from 1744 to 1752 in Boston, and from 1754 to 1757 in Philadelphia. One of his early commissions was an engraving of Boston for the cover of the American Magazine, July 1745, for whom Benjamin Franklin served as a publishing agent. Through his recommendations Turner received a number of commissions. While in Boston, he engraved John Franklin's bookplate, maps for James Alexander's Bill in the Chancery of New-Jersey (N.Y., 1747), and probably Lewis Evans' drawings for the Franklin stove pamphlet. Turner's advertisement in the Boston Evening Post, June 24, 1745, reads in part:

James Turner, Silversmith & Engraver. Near the Town-House in Cornhill Boston. Engraves all sorts of Copper Plates for the Rolling Press, all sorts of Stamps in Brass or Pewter for the common Printing Press, Coats of Arms, Crests, Cyphers, &c., on Gold, Silver, Steel, Copper, Brass or Pewter. He likewise makes Watch Faces, makes and cuts Seals in Gold, Silver, or Steel; or makes Steel Faces for Seals, and sets them handsomely in Gold or Silver . . . .

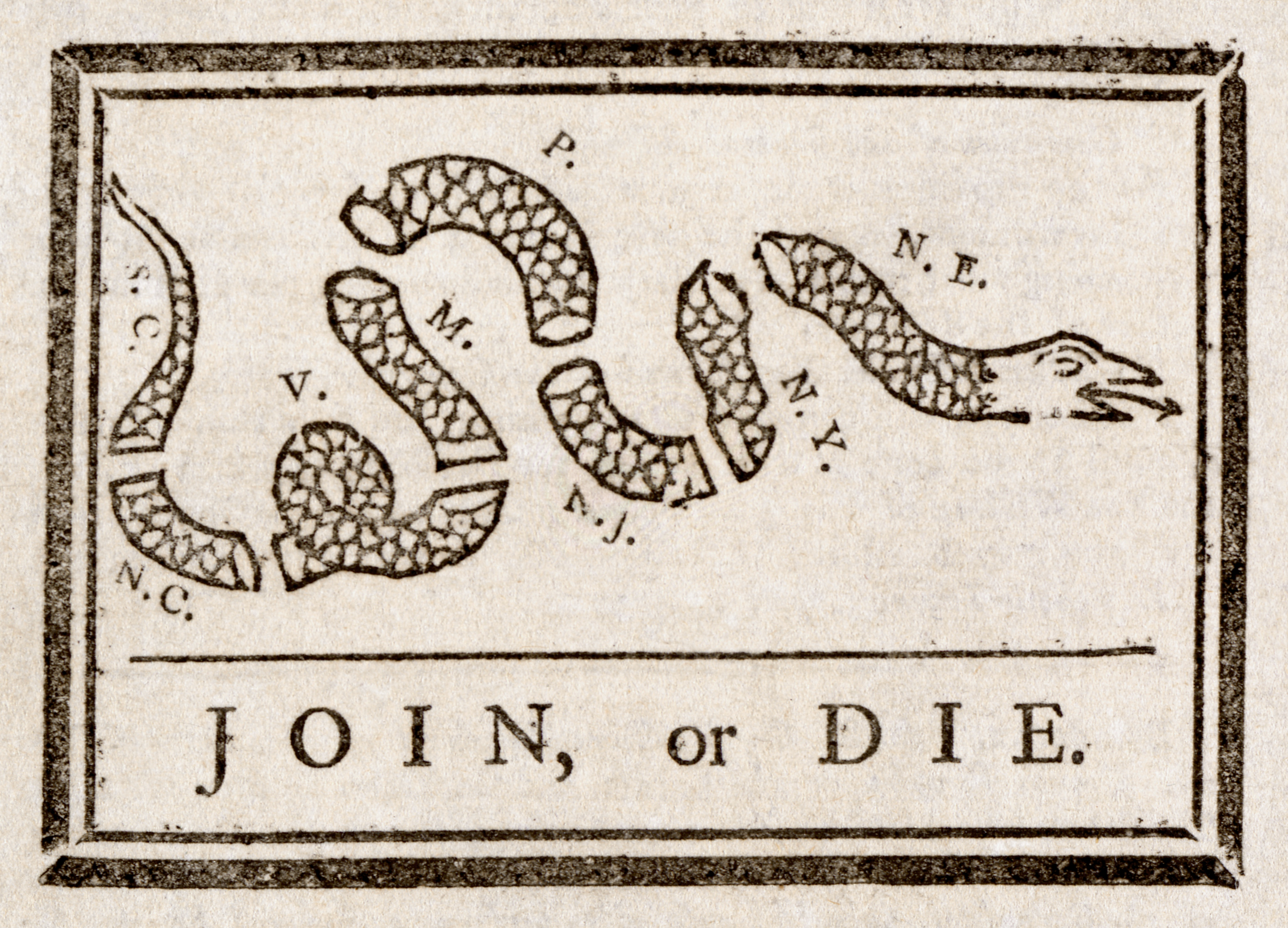
First American political cartoon - by James Turner (1754)

Around 1754 Turner moved his shop to Philadelphia, where he continued to engrave maps, bookplates, and for Franklin, the brass stamp of the Penn arms to be used as the masthead for Franklin's Pennsylvania Gazette. Martha Fales also suggests that "Franklin engaged Turner to cut the first American political cartoon — the segmented snake, with each section labeled to represent the various colonies, and below the sections the motto 'Join or Die.'" There he also engraved bookplates and engraved plates for the maps of Lewis Evans, 1755, and Nicholas Scull, 1759, as well as Joshua Fisher's Chart of the Delaware Bay.

His obituary was printed in the Boston Evening-Post on December 10, 1759: "We hear from Philadelphia that Mr. James Turner, engraver, formerly of this town, lately dies there of Smallpox."
