= Horsehead–Marbella =

Historic house in Rhode Island, United States

- Horsehead/Marbella
- U.S. National Register of Historic Places
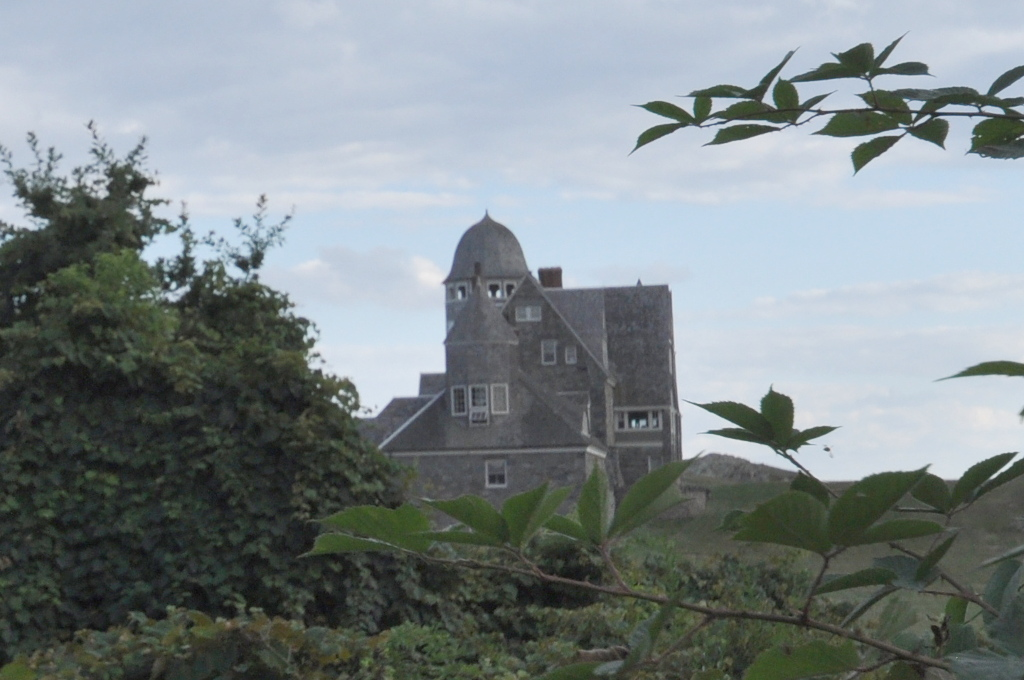
- Location: 240 Highland Drive, Jamestown, Rhode Island
- Coordinates: 41°28′34″N 71°22′32″W
- Built: 1883
- Built by: J. D. Johnston
- Architect: Charles L. Bevins
- NRHP reference No.: 99000675
- Added to NRHP: June 16, 1999

Horsehead/Marbella is an historic summer house at 240 Highland Drive in Jamestown, Rhode Island. Occupying a spectacular setting on a southerly-projecting peninsula, this Shingle style house and carriage house were designed by Charles L. Bevins and built for industrialist Joseph Wharton in the 1880s. It is also notable as an early example of the lower-key architectural styles associated with Jamestown's summer community, differentiating it from the more elaborate summer estates developed in nearby Newport.

The property was listed on the National Register of Historic Places in 1999. It continues to be owned by Wharton's descendants.

== See also ==
- National Register of Historic Places listings in Newport County, Rhode Island
