= Edmund Darch Lewis =

American painter

Edmund Darch Lewis (October 17, 1835 – August 12, 1910) was an American landscape painter known for his prolific style and marine oils and watercolors. Lewis was born in Philadelphia, Pennsylvania, in a well-to-do family. He started training at age 15 with German-born Paul Weber (1823–1916) of the Hudson River School. At age 19 he exhibited at the Pennsylvania Academy of the Fine Arts, and was elected an Associate of the Academy at age 24.

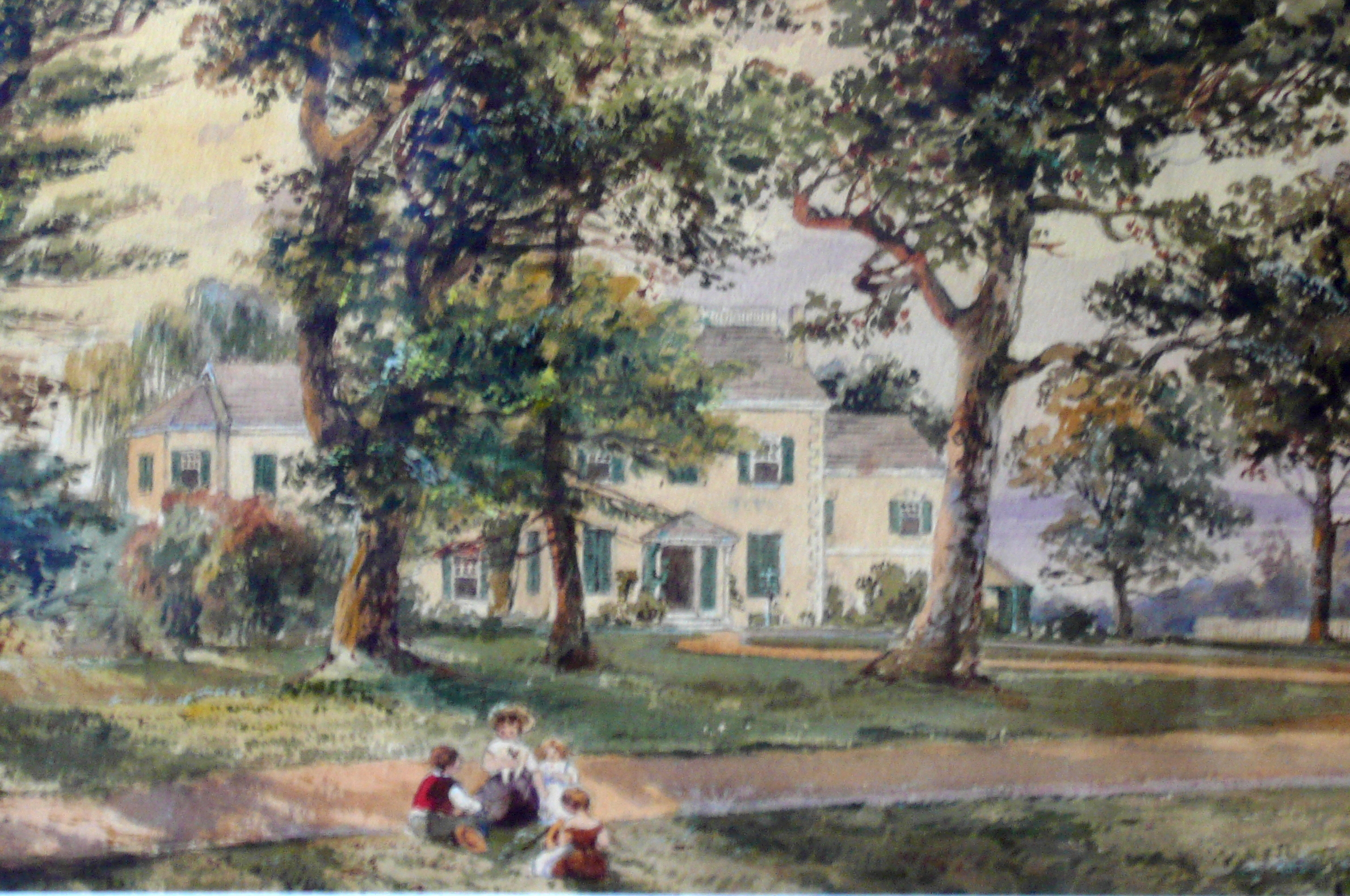
Crop of Darch's 1856 painting of Bellevue Mansion, the summer childhood home of Joseph Wharton, 3 miles north of Philadelphia, PA, looking south from Nicetown Lane.

== Career ==
Lewis's early work in oil, because of his excellent training, was precocious and is considered technically superior to his later work. He traveled throughout Pennsylvania, New Jersey and New York, painting river scenes, and for 2 decades he traveled to the White Mountains and painted landscapes of mountains, rivers, and lakes. He made extensive marine paintings throughout New England, becoming a prolific and successful artist. His work was appreciated because of the luminosity of their objects. Because of the lively yet glowing work, he is considered one of the Luminist painters in the Hudson River School.

After mastering oil painting early in his career, Lewis switched to watercolor painting. Although not as technically outstanding, his watercolors were also admired for their luminosity, and Lewis continued to generate canvases in mass production style.

=== Later life ===
Later in life, as an affluent artist Lewis collected decorative art, including furniture, ceramics, tapestries, and paintings by the masters. He had 2 adjacent homes constructed on 22nd St. in downtown Philadelphia to show his collection to Philadelphia society.

=== Lake Willoughby ===
Lewis's painting of Lake Willoughby (Vermont), a huge 80-inch canvas finished in 1867, is owned by the Pennsylvania Academy. The painting emphasized both the picturesque and sublime aspects of nature like other popular, mid-century popular spectacular panoramas of the Hudson River School.
