= Joseph Wharton =

American industrialist (1826–1909)

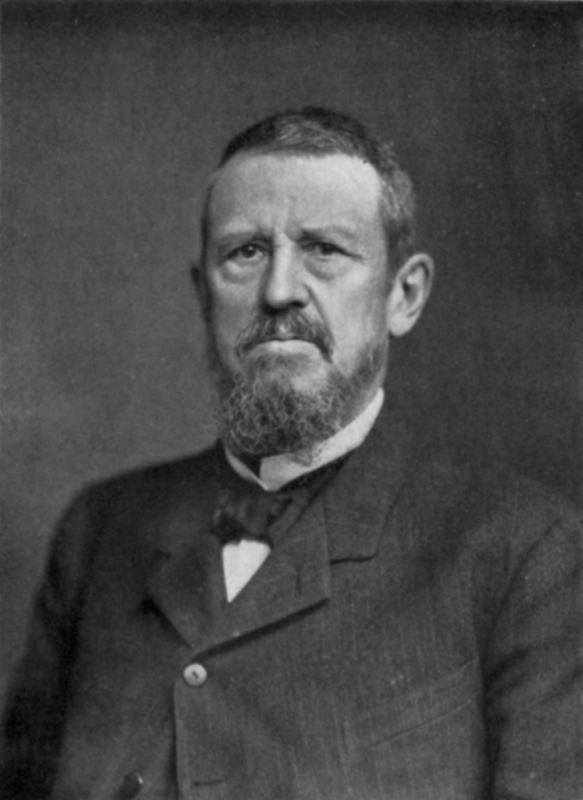
- Wharton in 1902
- Born: March 3, 1826; Philadelphia, Pennsylvania, U.S.
- Died: January 11, 1909 (aged 82); Philadelphia, Pennsylvania, U.S.
- Resting place: Laurel Hill Cemetery, Philadelphia, Pennsylvania, U.S.
- Occupation: Industrialist
- Political party: Republican
- Spouse: Anna Corbit Lovering (m. 1854)
- Children: Joanna W. Lippincott, Mary L. Wharton, Anna W. Morris.

Joseph Wharton (March 3, 1826 – January 11, 1909) was an American industrialist and philanthropist. He was instrumental in the development of the nickel and zinc metal industries in the United States. He created the first plant in the United States to produce metallic zinc, or spelter, and became the largest producer of nickel and pig iron in the country. His innovations in malleable nickel and magnetic nickel won him the gold medal at the Paris exposition of 1878. He was the largest shareholder in Bethlehem Steel, held multiple investments in railroads, and owned vast amounts of land containing iron, coal, copper and gold ores. He founded the Wharton School at the University of Pennsylvania and was one of the founders of Swarthmore College.

== Early life and education ==
Wharton was born in Philadelphia, on March 3, 1826, the fifth child of ten to William and Deborah Fisher Wharton. He was raised in the Quaker religion.

Wharton's youth was spent in the family's house near Spruce and 4th streets in Center City Philadelphia and at Bellevue, a country mansion near the Schuylkill River. He attended boarding schools in Byberry, Pennsylvania, and West Chester, Pennsylvania, as well as schools in Philadelphia. Between the age of 14 and 16, Wharton was prepared for college by a private tutor. At age 16, his health became a concern and he moved to East Fallowfield Township, Chester County, to work on the farm of Joseph and Abigail Walton for three years. During the winter months, he returned to Philadelphia and studied in the chemistry laboratory of Martin Hans Boyè and learned French and German languages.

Wharton matured to a strong frame, and was just over 6 feet (1.8 m) tall. He was accomplished in sports, including horseback riding, swimming, and rowing. He competed in crew races as a member of the Camilla Boat Club.

The University of Pennsylvania and Swarthmore College both granted him honorary degrees.

== Career ==
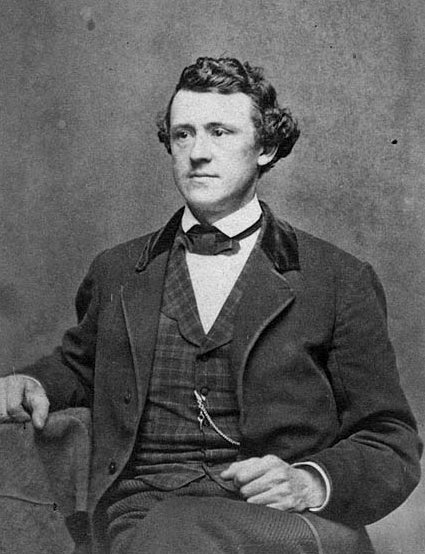
Wharton, c. 1850

When he was 19, Wharton apprenticed with an accountant for two years and became proficient in business methods and bookkeeping. In 1847, he partnered with his older brother Rodman to start a business manufacturing white lead. Wharton also partnered with his brother in a cottonseed oil business for four years but disbanded the venture in 1849.

He started a business manufacturing bricks in 1849 using a patented machine which formed dry clay into bricks. He left the brick-making business due to the significant competition and cyclical business swings.

=== Zinc and nickel manufacturing ===
In 1853, Wharton joined the Pennsylvania and Lehigh Zinc Company near Bethlehem, Pennsylvania. He first managed the mining operation and then the zinc oxide works. Wharton negotiated a new charter for the works, and in the difficult financial environment of 1857–1858, he took over control of the zinc works, and managed it carefully so that it turned a profit. In 1859, he developed the first production of metallic zinc, or spelter, in the United States. He brought in experienced workers from the Vieille Montagne works in Belgium, built sixteen furnaces and by 1863 had produced nine million pounds of spelter.

Wharton was asked by James Pollock, the Director of the United States Mint, to secure an American source of nickel to provide raw material for the minting of one-cent coins. In 1863, he sold his interest in zinc and started the manufacture of nickel at Camden, New Jersey. He took a controlling interest in the Gap Mining Company, a nickel mine and refining works in Nickel Mines, Pennsylvania. In 1866, Congress passed a law authorizing the creation of a 3-cent coin consisting of 75% copper and 25% nickel, and the nickel, as it became known, was created.

He partnered with Theodor Fleitmann for several years to improve the manufacturing process. The Camden plant was located on the east side of 10th Street, adjacent to Cooper Creek, and had several large brick buildings and smokestacks. Wharton renamed the Camden plant the American Nickel Works, and his office there became his center of operations. In July 1868, the plant burned down but was quickly rebuilt with brick and stone replacing the original wood structure. Wharton had success due to his production of the first in the world malleable nickel. He also created nickel magnets, and received a gold medal at the Paris Exposition of 1878 for his inventions.

For the next 25 years, Wharton's operations were the largest nickel manufacturer in the United States and produced 17% of the world's supply. The surface deposits at the Gap mine were eventually depleted, and Wharton began to purchase nickel ore from mines in the Sudbury Basin.

After the American Civil War, demand for coinage declined and the amount of nickel purchased from Wharton by the United States Mint decreased. Wharton became frustrated with the Mint since they had requested that he enter the nickel industry. He did not sell any nickel to the mint in 1870 and 1871 and temporarily closed the plant in 1870. He threatened to completely close the only nickel manufacturer in the United States.

By the 1870s, Wharton had made several million dollars in profit from his nickel business. He made huge profits from 1873 to 1876 by supplying Prussia with nickel to mint their coins. In 1877, the price of nickel plummeted due to new reserves discovered in New Caledonia and the formation of the French conglomerate Société Le Nickel. By 1900, the nickel industry outlook was fading and Wharton and a group of other American and Canadian nickel enterprises formed the International Nickel Company in 1902. In 1905, Wharton's American Nickel Works were merged with the Orford Copper Company which ended Wharton's involvement in nickel manufacturing.

=== Water supply efforts ===
The Wharton family's Bellevue Mansion estate in North Philadelphia, along with several others nearby that had been annexed into the city, were threatened with condemnation by the city for the construction of a new reservoir to hold potable water. Wharton started purchasing land in South Jersey in the 1870s, eventually acquiring 150 square miles (390 km^{2}) in the Pinelands, which contained an aquifer replenished by several rivers and lakes. The water from the Pinelands was relatively pure and he planned to export the water to Philadelphia. Wharton suggested that a city-controlled company could develop the necessary water mains and pump, funded by public purchase of company shares and bonds. Opposition to the plan emerged in Philadelphia and in New Jersey, and eventually, a law was passed in New Jersey preventing the export of water.

=== Mining and railroads ===
Wharton traveled widely and became involved in many industrial enterprises such as mines, factories and railroads. He started several enterprises on South Jersey property, including a menhaden fish factory that produced fertilizer, a modern forestry planting operation, and cranberry and sugar beet farms. Wharton purchased land in Port Oram, New Jersey, to expand his iron operations. He added furnaces to the site with the capacity to produce over 1,000 tons of iron per day.

He owned over 5,000 acres of ore-containing land. He had extensive ownership of coal-containing lands, with 7,500 acres in Indiana County, Pennsylvania, and 24,000 acres in West Virginia and New York. He owned iron and copper mines in Michigan, and gold mines in Arizona and Nevada. Wharton became involved in railroads including the Reading, Lehigh Valley Railroad, San Antonio Railroad, Arkansas Pass Railroad, Oregon Pacific Railroad, and Hibernia Mine Railroad.

=== Bethlehem Steel ===
In the 1870s Wharton began to invest in Bethlehem Iron Company which produced pig iron and steel for railroads. He became the largest shareholder with a position on the board of managers, and eventually purchased a controlling share of the company. He was the largest single producer of pig iron in the United States. In 1885, Wharton successfully bid a contract with the United States Navy for forged steel armor, and in 1886 he visited England (Whitworth Co.) and France (Schneider Co.) to research the designs for a plant to forge steel of higher quality. With these designs, Bethlehem Iron built the first plant to forge high-strength steel in the United States. The plant fabricated armor plates and guns for warships.

=== Science ===
Wharton was a scientist interested in the natural world, and wrote scientific papers on a variety of topics including astronomy and metallurgy, presenting several to the American Philosophical Society. He was elected to the Society in 1869.

In the winter of 1883–1884 there was a period of several months when sunsets were extraordinarily red worldwide. Some imagined that the red color was from dust dispersed in the atmosphere worldwide by the volcano Krakatoa, which erupted. Others imagined that the reddish hue might come from iron and steel furnaces because they were known to create a reddish-brown dust. Wharton was curious, and one morning when a light snow was falling, collected some from a field near his house, melted and evaporated it, studying the remaining particles under a microscope, which he had on hand for metallurgy. The particles looked like "irregular, flattish, blobby" glass particles. He visited a ship from Manila that arrived in port in Philadelphia, a course that took a few hundred miles from Krakatoa. It had been slowed by a huge amount of pumice floating in the ocean, evidently spewed out by Krakatoa. Wharton obtained some pumice from one of the ship's crew, compared it with the dust he had collected, and found almost identical particles. In 1893, Wharton presented a paper about the dust to the 150th anniversary meeting of the American Philosophical Society.

Wharton also wrote a paper about the use of the Doppler effect on the color of light emitted by binary stars to determine their distance from Earth, and made the analogy to a train whistle which changes tone as it passes.

Wharton served as president of the American Iron and Steel Association and as a member of the Iron and Steel Institute. He led the electoral tickets for the Republican Party nomination of William McKinley for president.

== Philanthropy ==
=== Swarthmore College ===
In 1864, Wharton, along with his mother Deborah Fisher Wharton and a group of like-minded Hicksite Quakers from Philadelphia, Baltimore, and New York City were the founders of Swarthmore College, a Hicksite Quaker college outside Philadelphia. Swarthmore filled an important need of a college where both men and women could receive a high-quality education in the tradition of Friends not dominated by religion.

Wharton donated $150,000 for the construction of Wharton Hall, $40,000 for the endowment of the Chair of Economics and Political Science, $10,000 for the construction of a library, $15,000 for the construction of a Friends Meeting House, and $10,000 for the construction of a science hall. His mother Deborah served on the Swarthmore Board of Managers from 1862 to 1870, and Joseph served on the board from 1870 to 1909, and from 1883 to 1907 as its president. He was often on campus and gave many commencement addresses.

=== Wharton School ===
Wharton wrote extensively on economic matters, including protective tariffs and business cycles. In the last half of the 19th century, business education typically consisted mainly of training on the job or an apprenticeship. Wharton conceived of a school that would teach how to develop and run a business, and to anticipate and deal with the cycles of economic activity.

In 1881, Wharton donated $100,000 to the University of Pennsylvania to found a "School of Finance and Economy" to help students succeed in business. He insisted that the Wharton School faculty educate on economic protectionism, similar to the lobbying he had done for American businesses in Washington. However, the school soon began to broaden its outlook to a global one and to teach other disciplines such as politics and the developing social sciences, and introduced the teaching of business management and finance as these disciplines gradually coalesced. The Wharton School was the first to include such a practical focus on business, finance, and management. During its first century through the present day, it was and is widely known as one of the most prominent schools of business in the world. In 2023, the Wharton School fell off of the Financial Times' 2023 MBA rankings for the first time since the ranking's inception.

== Final years and death ==
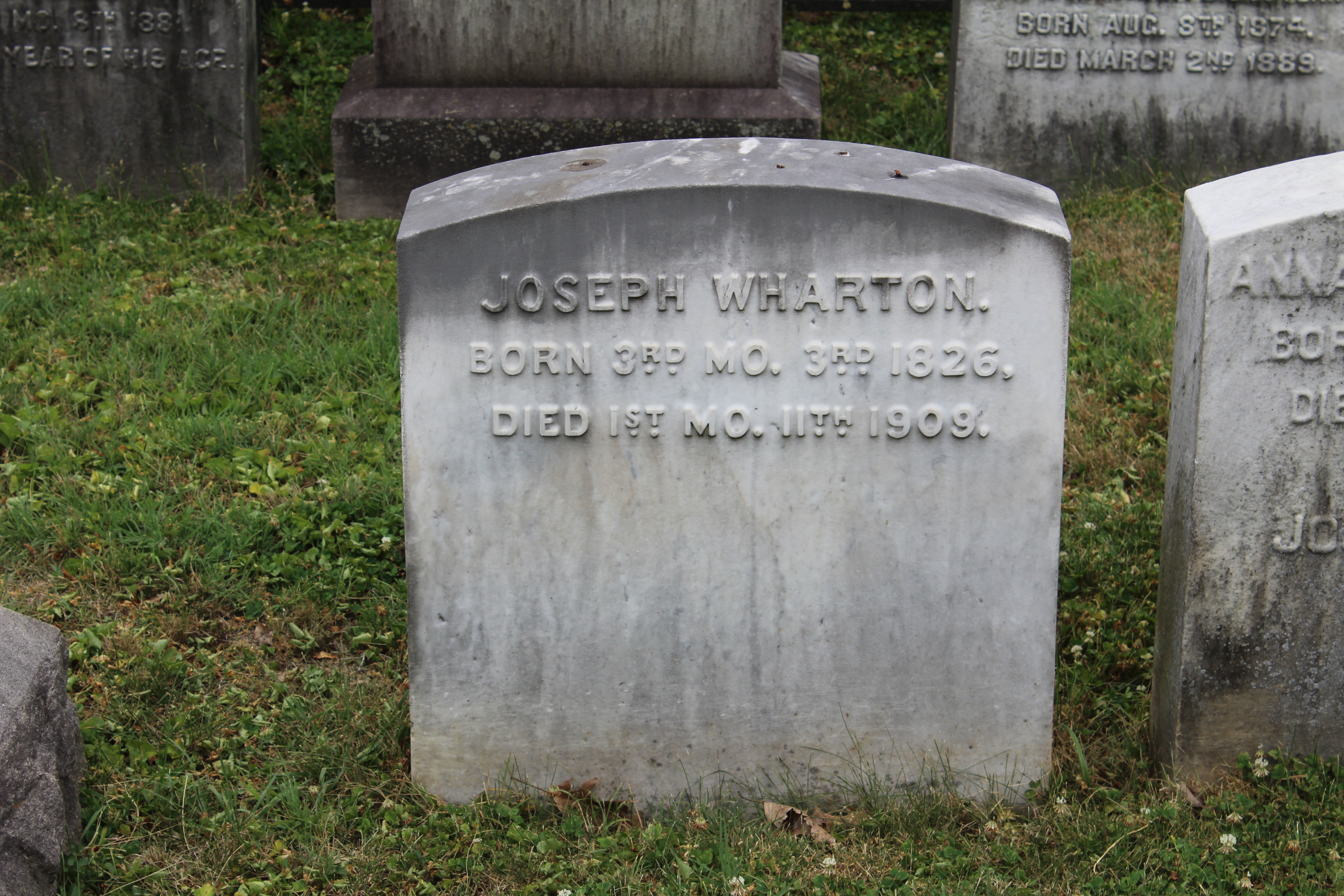
Wharton's tombstone in Laurel Hill Cemetery

Wharton was active to near the end of his life both physically and in business affairs. Until he was 72, he skated with guests on the pond at his Ontalauna estate near Philadelphia and would often go on walks with his family after dinner. He practiced total abstinence from tobacco and restricted use of alcohol. When he was nearly 80, he visited his Nevada silver mine by canoeing down the Colorado River and descending into the mine in a bucket, and when he was 81, he traveled to Germany with his grandson, Joseph Wharton Lippincott, to visit Kaiser Wilhelm II and had dinner on the kaiser's yacht.

He read widely in literature and was an accomplished poet. Many of his poems were inspired by trips abroad. He wrote "Stewardson's Yarn" after an 1873 visit to Europe, "The Royal Palm" and "The 'Sweet Reasonableness' of a Yankee Philistine in Cuba" after a visit to Cuba to inspect mines there, and "Mexico" after an 1889 visit to Mexico. A domestic journey to Nevada to see his gold mines there resulted in "The Buttes of the Canyon".

In 1907, Wharton experienced a stroke while travelling in London. He survived the stroke and was able to travel home but never fully recovered his health. In 1908 he established the Wharton Steel Company with assets valued over $10 million and transferred all of his coke, iron, limestone, pig iron and railroad interests into this entity. His health was worsened by a fall and he died at his Ontalauna estate on January 11, 1909, at age 82. He was interred at Laurel Hill Cemetery in Philadelphia.

== Personal life ==
Wharton married Anna Corbit Lovering, on June 15, 1854. After living with Anna's family for several months, the couple moved into a near 12th and Walnut streets in Philadelphia. They had a daughter named Joanna. Wharton lived apart from the family while managing the zinc works in Bethlehem, Pennsylvania, and Anna cared for their child at their home in Philadelphia.

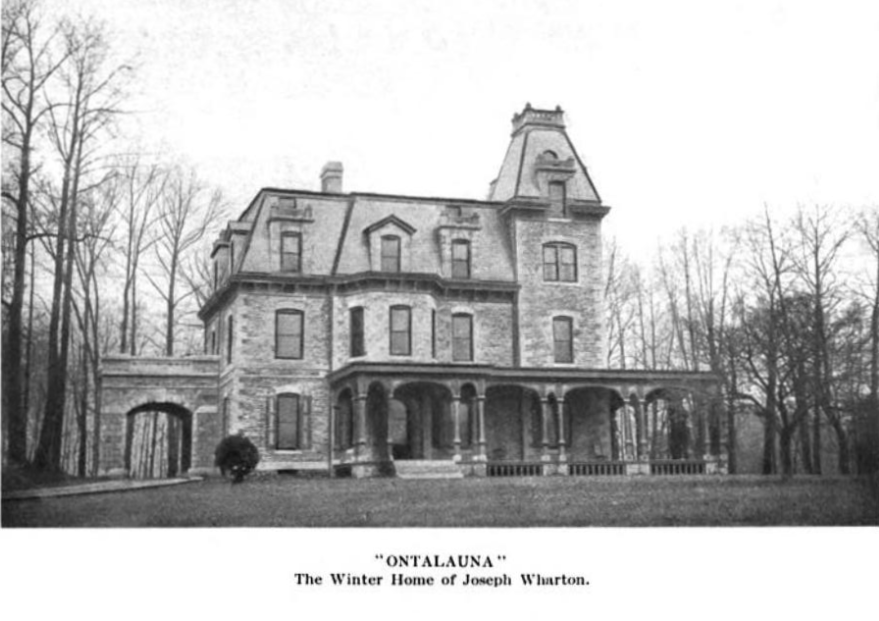
Ontalauna was the Winter home of Joseph Wharton and his family in Pennsylvania

In 1856, Wharton rented the house in Philadelphia and moved with his family to Bethlehem, Pennsylvania. After Wharton sold his interest in zinc, they returned to Philadelphia. He purchased a 63-acre estate in the Branchtown neighborhood of Philadelphia, and built a Second Empire style mansion he named "Ontalauna".

He was a member of the Union League of Philadelphia.

In the 1880s, Wharton purchased land in Jamestown, Rhode Island, and built an estate he named "Marabella" for usage as a summer residence.

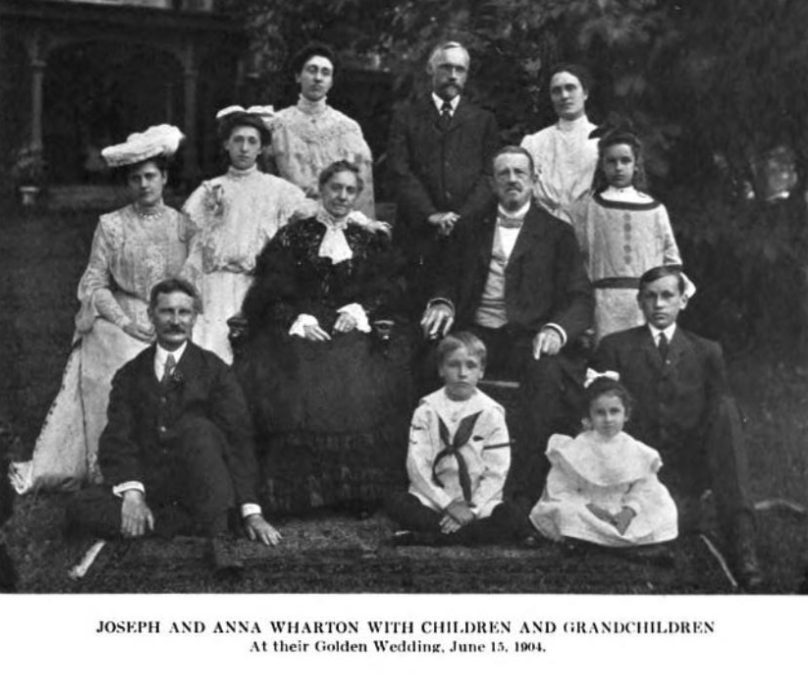
Wharton and his family in 1904

Wharton is the grandfather of the publisher Joseph Wharton Lippincott, great-grandfather of the publisher Joseph Wharton Lippincott Jr., and the great-great-great-grandfather of former UCLA and Arizona Cardinals quarterback Josh Rosen.

== Legacy ==
In 1908, Wharton granted a 25-acre (100,000 m^{2}) plot of forested land to the city of Philadelphia for the creation of a park. In 1954, the Wharton family sold his vast Pinelands properties in South Jersey to the state of New Jersey, which now form the core of Wharton State Forest.

In 1981, a Joseph Wharton 18-cent commemorative postal stamp designed by Rudolph de Harak, was issued to commemorate the 100th anniversary of the founding of the Wharton School.

In 1997, Wharton was inducted into the National Mining Hall of Fame.

The borough of Wharton, New Jersey, originally known as Port Oram, was renamed in his honor.

== Publications ==
- On Two Peculiar Products in the Nickel Manufacture, American Journal of Science, s2-49(147), 365–368, 1870
- Memorandum Concerning Small Money and Nickel Alloy Coinage: With Illustrations and Descriptions of Existing Nickel Alloy Coins., Collins, 1877
- Wharton, Joseph. Article on zinc manufacture in American Journal of Science, Sept 1871, p 168.
- Dust from the Krakatoa Eruption of 1883, Proceedings of the American Philosophical Society Held at Philadelphia for Promoting Useful Knowledge, American Philosophical Society, 32 (193), 343–345
- Wharton, Joseph. Letter to the editor on plans for water supply, Evening Bulletin, June 17, 1891.
- The Creed in the Discipline, Philadelphia: Allen, Lane & Scott, 1892
- Speculations Upon a Possible Method of Determining the Distance of Certain Variably Colored Stars, American Journal of Science and Arts: Series II, Vol 40:190–192, 1865
- Mexico, Philadelphia: J.B. Lippincott Company, 1902
