= Oliver Wickes =

American military officer and carpenter

- Born: September 29, 1757; Coventry, Rhode Island
- Died: June 22, 1855 (aged 97); East Greenwich, Rhode Island
- Burial place: East Greenwich, Rhode Island (Oliver Wickes Lot)
- Military career
- Branch: Rhode Island Line (Continental Army (1775); Rhode Island Militia (1776–1785)
- Service years: 1775–1785
- Rank: Private (1775–77), Sergeant (1778), Ensign 1780–1785
- Conflicts: American Revolutionary War; Siege of Boston; Battle of Rhode Island
- Other work: Contributing properties to East Greenwich Historic District * Oliver Wickes House (ca. 1785) * Kent County Courthouse (ca. 1804)

Oliver Wickes (September 29, 1757 – June 22, 1855) was a skilled carpenter who became an enlisted soldier and military officer serving with the Rhode Island Militia during the Revolutionary War.

== Military service ==
At the age of 17 (in May 1775), Private Wickes enlisted with the 2nd Rhode Island Regiment (known as Hitchcock's Regiment) was authorized on May 6, 1775, under Colonel Daniel Hitchcock in the Rhode Island Army of Observation, which shortly was adopted into the Continental Army and participated in the Siege of Boston thru the end of the year. Wickes served twice more for one-month enlistments in 1776 and 1777 as a private including time in General Joseph Spencer's Expedition.

In 1778, now a sergeant, he was serving Colonel Archibald Kasson's Regiment that served in General Sullivan's Expedition and was there during the "Great Storm" of August 1778 that pounded New England during the Battle of Rhode Island.

In June 1780, Governor William Greene signed his commissioning papers and Wickes was commissioned as Ensign for the 2nd Company (Coventry), Kent County Regiment (Lieutenant Colonel Commandant Kasson's Regiment). He served as Ensign thru May 1785.

== Skilled carpenter ==
After the Revolutionary War, Ensign Wickes returned to his carpentry skills and built his own home (1785) and the Kent County Courthouse (built in 1804) and now serving as the East Greenwich Town Hall. The Kent County Courthouse, which is a two-and-a-half-story, hip-roof, clapboarded building, and is described as a landmark example of Federal architecture in Rhode Island. In addition, the Oliver Wickes House at 21 Pierce Street, East Greenwich, built circa 1785, is a Federal style, Colonial, 2 1/2-story, exposed basement story framed home, both are contributing properties to the East Greenwich Historic District listed with the National Register of Historic Places.

== Civil service and politics ==
He served as the Justice of the Peace for East Greenwich, Kent County, Rhode Island, between 1779 and 1781. In 1802, he was elected to the Rhode Island House of Representatives.

== Personal life ==
Born in Coventry, Wickes lived in Rhode Island throughout his life. On November 20, 1777, he married his 2nd cousin Abigail Greene. Both are great-grandchildren of the former Rhode Island Deputy Governor John Greene Jr.; Abigail's maternal lineage includes Clement Weaver, one of the founders of East Greenwich. Together, they had seven children from 1778 to 1798. She died in 1802. In 1811, he married Marguerite Littlefield and had one son, Oliver Wickes, Jr. Oliver, Sr., died June 22, 1855, in East Greenwich at the age of 97 and is buried at Rhode Island Historic Cemetery East Greenwich No. 72 (also known as, Oliver Wickes Lot).
