= Massie Wireless Station =

- U.S. National Register of Historic Places
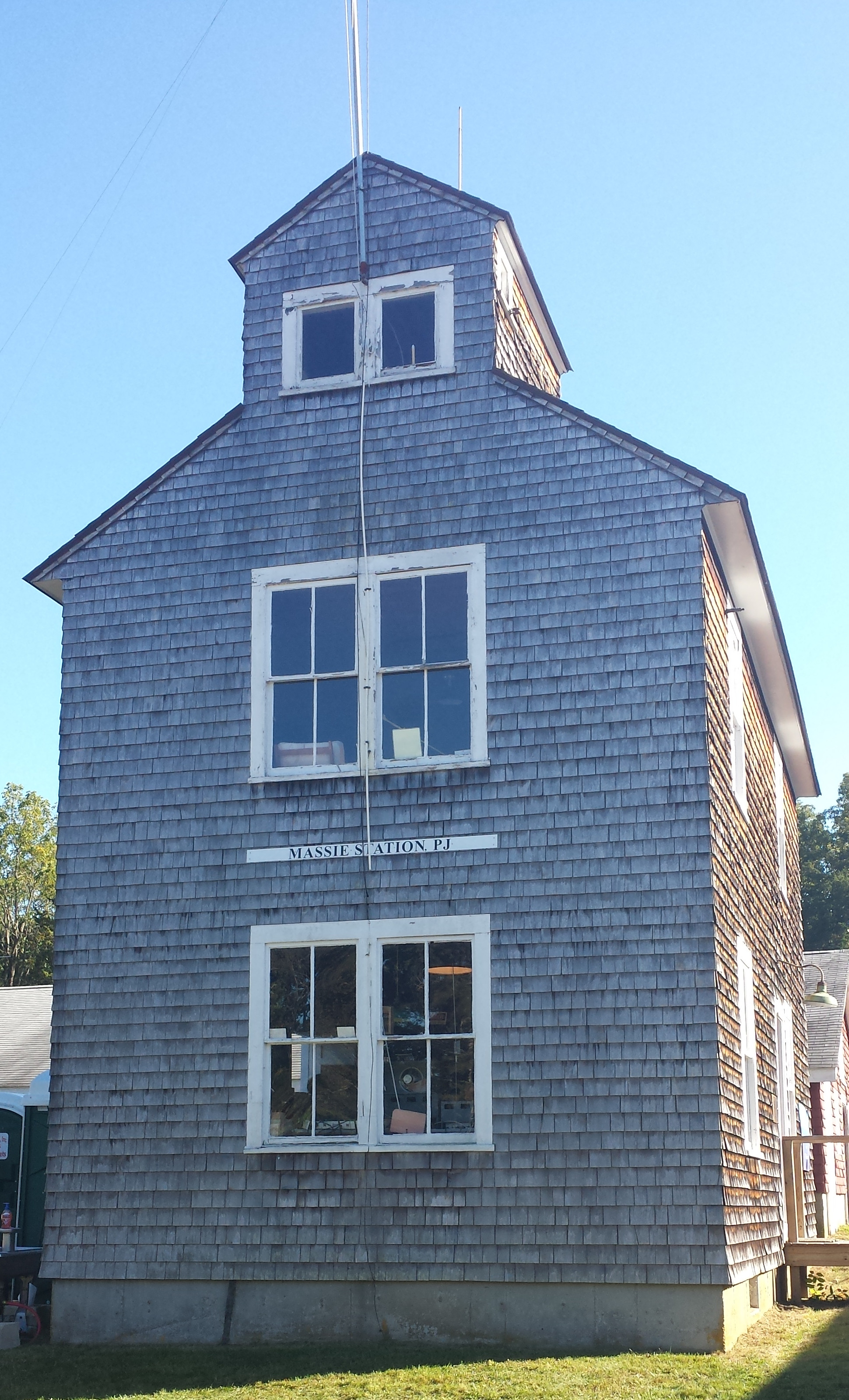
- The station at its current location

- Location within Rhode Island Location within the United States
- Location: 1300 Frenchtown Road; East Greenwich, Rhode Island
- Coordinates: 41°37′26.78″N 71°30′45.43″W
- Built: 1907
- NRHP reference No.: 01001157
- Added to NRHP: October 22, 2001

The Massie Wireless Station (PJ) was built in Point Judith, Rhode Island, in 1907 and is noted as a historically early surviving working wireless station. It is named for inventor Walter Wentworth Massie, president of the Massie Wireless Telegraph Company. The structure was moved to the New England Wireless and Steam Museum in 1983 where it is preserved as a technology museum and historic site.

== History ==
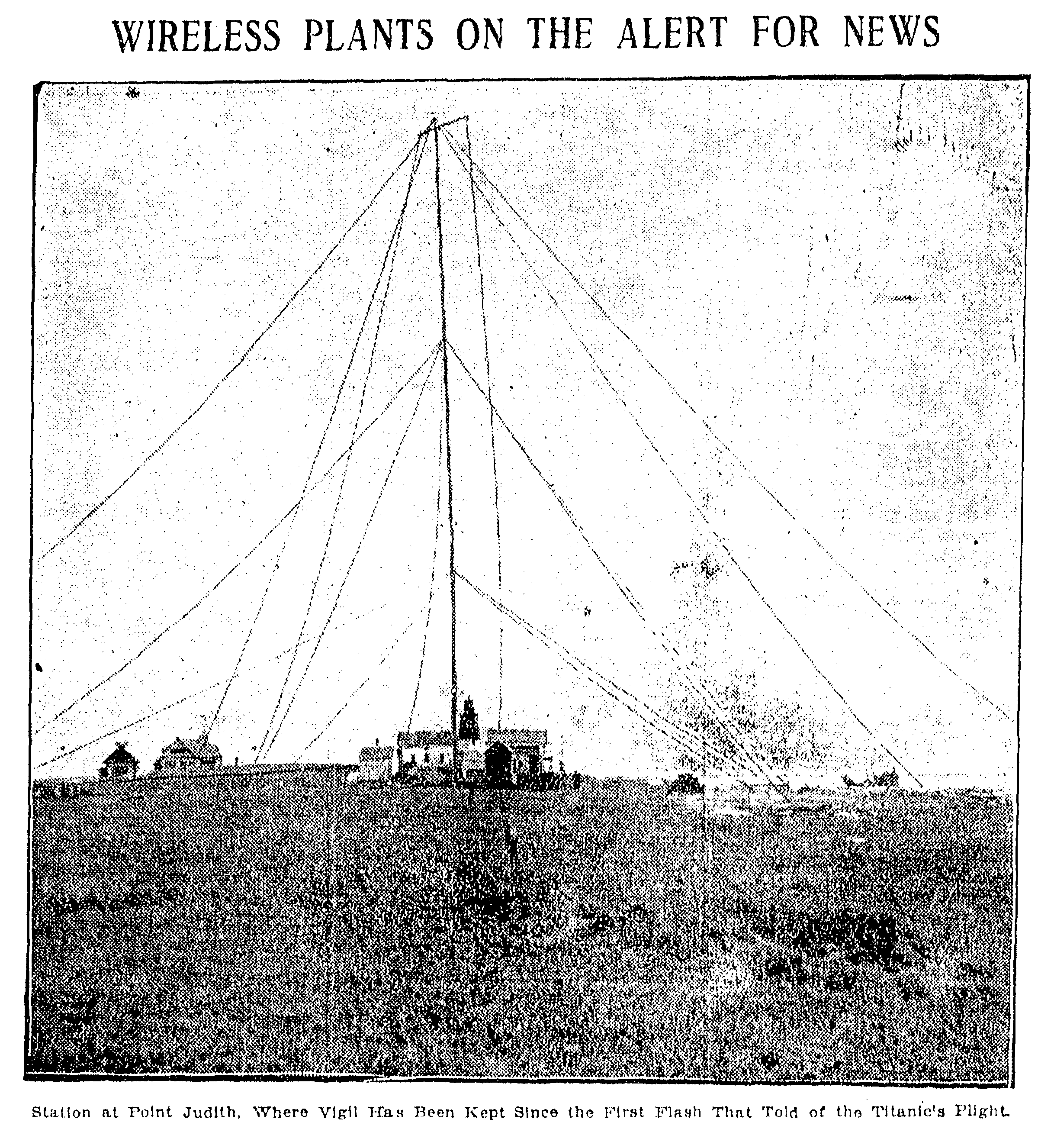
Point Judith station with antenna, 1912.

In December 1902 the American De Forest Wireless Telegraph Company set up an earlier station in an existing house on a beach near Point Judith Light and another near Block Island Southeast Light, 15 miles (24 km) from the coast. By May 1903 they had successfully exchanged test messages. Messages were sent using Morse code. The stations were initially operated for the Providence Journal to send news stories to the island to be printed locally. Another goal was that passing ships could also send messages to the mainland which would then be relayed to Providence or New York City by telephone arriving hours before the ships reached port. At this time few places in the world were passed by so many ships as Block Island. The Block Island Wireless began publishing in July. At the time it was one of only two daily newspapers that printed dispatches sent by wireless. (Note: The other was The Wireless published on Santa Catalina Island by the Los Angeles Times starting in March 1903.) The stations soon began sending messages (called "aerograms") for the public and charging a fee for the service. Initially, this experimental wireless service was only intermittently successful and the Block Island Wireless ceased publication at the end of August 1903.

The Journal, dissatisfied with the operation, offered management of the two stations to the recently formed Massie company. By 1904 the new equipment installed by Massie to replace the de Forest system enabled reliable two-way communication between the island and the mainland. The stations also provided communications to passenger steamships, particularly those of the Fall River Line. When Massie equipped the steamship Plymouth with wireless it was the first Long Island Sound steamer to have this capability. A Massie employee was stationed on the ship as the wireless operator. During initial tests the coast station was able to communicate with the ship at a distance of 33 miles (53 km). The crews on these ships considered Point Judith to be a dangerous point on this route. The shore station would advise them of adverse weather conditions such as fog hours before they reached it. The station would then aid in navigation as it passed. By 1905 with improvements to the station at Block Island it was able to detect signals from approaching ocean liners beyond the Nantucket Shoals Lightship 66, a distance of 150 miles (240 km).

In 1907 Massie upgraded the Point Judith station by constructing a new building, the one that is preserved today, on the same site. The spark-gap transmitter operated at up to 2 kW power and was connected to an antenna tower that was 300 feet (91 m) tall. The wavelength (Note: Documents from this era listed the wavelength of the station instead of the equivalent radio frequency as is common today. That convention is followed in this article. The wavelength/frequency is only approximate due to the 50 kHz wide bandwidth of a spark-gap transmission.) of transmission was listed as 400 metres (750 kHz) in 1907 and 325 metres (920 kHz) in 1912.

The steamships Santurce and Ligonaire collided off the coast of Cape Cod due to a thick fog in May 1910. The distress call CQD was received by the Point Judith station which then dispatched a wrecking tug to assist the ships. Wireless operators at the station kept a vigil in April 1912 listening for news from rescue vessels about the sinking of the RMS Titanic.

Ownership of Massie's stations was then transferred to Marconi's Wireless Telegraph Company in August 1912. The sale included all shore and ship stations along with the contracts that the business held. Massie retained the rights to his patents and continued to maintain a shop with his laboratory equipment. The Point Judith station ceased operation shortly after that. (Note: The United States Radio Law of August 13, 1912 prohibited spurious emissions of the type that are characteristic of spark-gap transmissions.) At the time it was shut down it had a range of up to 500 miles (800 km).

In 1917 a "radiophone fog warning device" was installed in the lighthouse adjacent to the shutdown Massie station. It transmitted a voice recording of the phrase "Point Judith Light" via wireless which could be received at a range of 8 miles (13 km). After three repetitions of this it would then transmit "you are getting closer; keep off" at lower power with a reception range of only 2 miles (3.2 km).

The building then became a Western Union landline telegraph station until World War II. In subsequent decades it was used as a summer house.

== Other stations ==
The two original stations were joined by others to form a system along the southern coast of New England. Massie operated other stations from New Jersey to Massachusetts. The Point Judith station identified using the call letters "PJ". Other stations (and their call letters) that were part of the Massie system included:

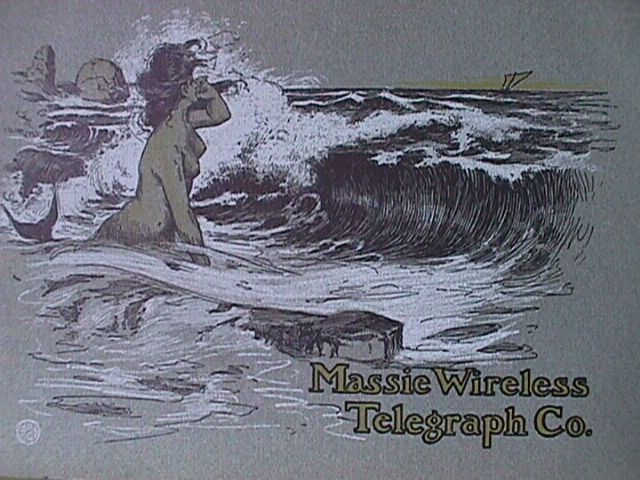
Massie Wireless Telegraph Co.

Massie system coast stations
Location	Call
Chatham, Massachusetts	AU
Block Island, Rhode Island	BI
Cape May, New Jersey	CP
Providence, Rhode Island	HG
Jacksonville, Florida	JX
Point Judith, Rhode Island	PJ
Wilson's Point at Norwalk, Connecticut	WN
New London, Connecticut	WS

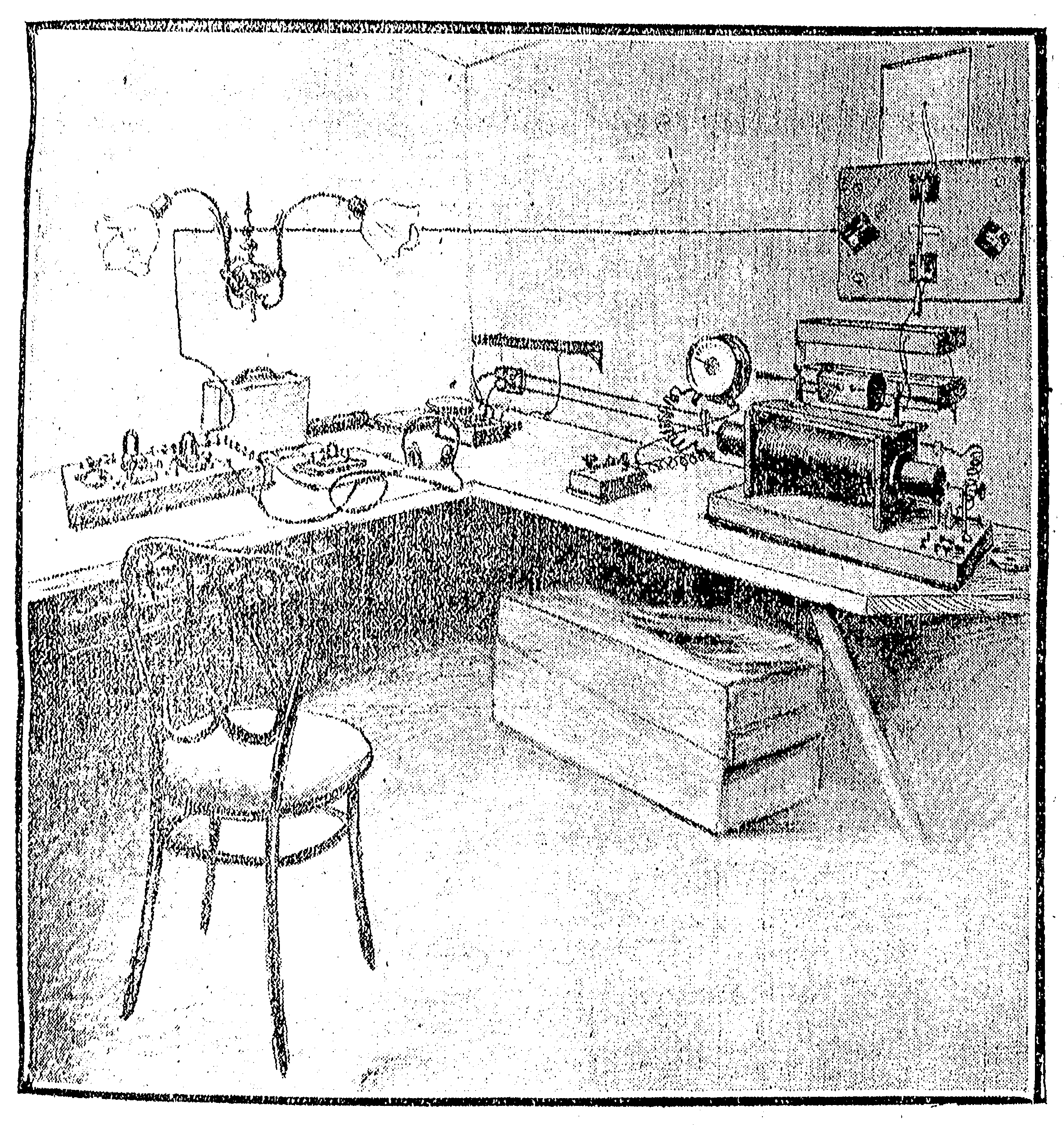
Massie wireless telegraph system on the steamer Plymouth, 1904.

Fall River Line steamships
Steamship	Call
Priscilla	CA
Pilgrim	GM
Chester W. Chapin	HN
Providence	PV
Plymouth	PX
Puritan	RN
City of Lowell	WE

== Preservation ==
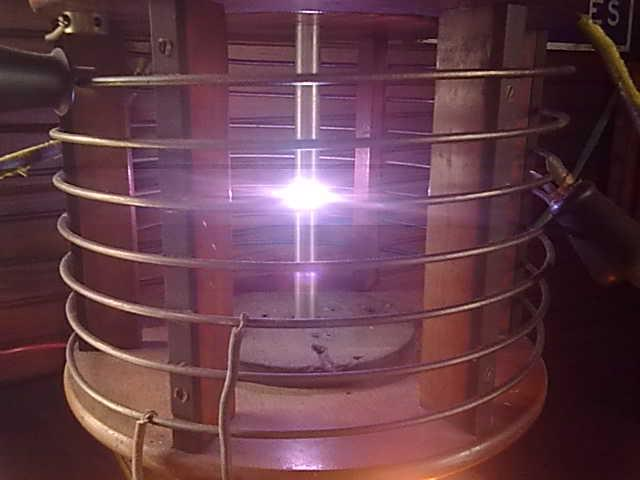
Demonstration of the restored Massie spark-gap transmitter.

Audio of Massie spark-gap transmission
Morse code of the message "CQ DE PJ"

In 1983 the building was moved to the New England Wireless and Steam Museum in East Greenwich, Rhode Island, to avoid demolition. The former site is now part of Roger Wheeler State Beach. The station is now situated within the Tillinghast Road Historic District, of which it is listed as a non-contributing building.

The original equipment from the station was donated to the Museum by Massie's family. The transmitter is functional and now operates at 850 metres (350 kHz) though it is not connected to an antenna. The station was added to the National Register of Historic Places in 2001. It may be the oldest surviving working wireless station in the world.

The Massie Wireless Club began amateur radio operation from the station in 2018 using the club call sign N1EPJ.

Another building at the museum contains a collection of various historic telegraph, radio, and television equipment.

== See also ==
- Archie Frederick Collins – Massie's company merged with Collins' company in 1909, though the arrangement soon ended.
