= WCFA =

WCFA may refer to:

- World Christian Fundamentals Association, Christian evangelical organization founded in 1919 by Baptist minister William Bell Riley
- WCFA-LP (101.5 FM), non-commercial low-power FM community radio station in Cape May, New Jersey
- Warwick Center for the Arts, art museum in Warwick, Rhode Island
