= Kent County Brigade =

The Kent County Brigade was formed as part of the Rhode Island Militia during the American Revolutionary War. The Brigade was composed of 3 Regiments of 19 Companies from the towns of Warwick, East Greenwich, West Greenwich, and Coventry.

The Regiments were commanded by:

- 1st Kent County Regiment (Warwick) under Col. John Waterman

Replaced by Col. Thomas Holden by May 1778

Under Lt. Col. Thomas Tillinghast, May 1780

No officers listed, May 1782

Under Lt. Col. Job Pierce, May 1783

- 2nd Kent County Regiment (West Greenwich) under Col. Stephen Potter

Replaced by Col. Nathaniel Brown, December 1776

Replaced by Lt. Col. Archibald Kasson by May 1778 to close of war.

- Kent County Senior Class Regiment under Maj. Samuel Wall, formed May 1780

Under Maj. Isaac Johnson, May 1781

Composition of the Brigade under Brig. General Thomas Holden in the summer of 1780:

The Kent County Brigade
Brig. Gen. Thomas Holden
Regiment	City	Company	Captain
1st Kent County	Warwick	1st Warwick	Job Randall
Lt. Col. Thomas Tillinghast		2nd Warwick	Squire Millard
		3rd Warwick	Thomas Rice
	East Greenwich	1st East Greenwich	Micah Whitmarsh
		2nd East Greenwich	Allen Johnston
		Artillery Co.	Oliver Gardner
		Horse Co.	Stukley Hudson
2nd Kent County	West Greenwich	1st West Greenwich	Samuel Hopkins
Lt. Col. Archibald Kasson		2nd West Greenwich	Benjamin Gorton
		3rd West Greenwich	Joseph Draper
	Coventry	1st Coventry	Joseph Brayton
		2nd Coventry	William Roy
		3rd Coventry	Langford Weaver
		4th Coventry	Asaph Bennet
		Artillery Co.	Edmund Johnston
		Horse Co.	??
Kent County Senior Class Battalion			
	Warwick/East Greenwich	Senior Class Co.	Robert Rhodes
	Coventry	Senior Class Co.	Abel Bennet
	West Greenwich	Senior Class Co.	Joseph Hopkins
