= Archie Frederick Collins =

American radio pioneer and writer (1869–1952)

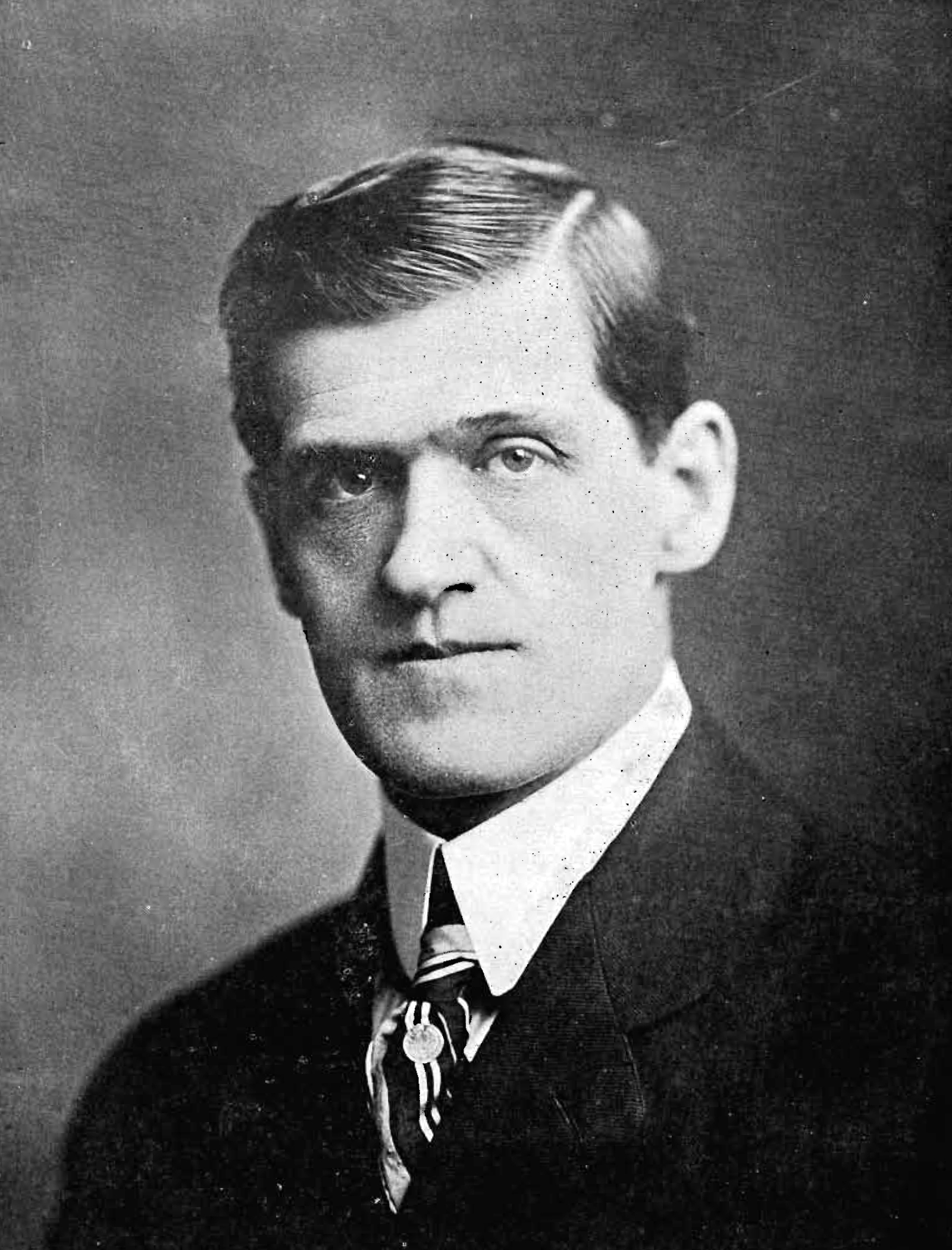
- Born: January 8, 1869; South Bend, Indiana
- Died: January 3, 1952 (aged 82); Nyack, New York

Archie Frederick Collins (January 8, 1869 – January 3, 1952), who generally went by A. Frederick Collins, was a prominent early American experimenter in wireless telephony and prolific author of books and articles covering a wide range of scientific and technical subjects. His reputation was tarnished in 1913 when he was convicted of mail fraud related to stock promotion. However, after serving a year in prison, he returned to writing, including, beginning in 1922, The Radio Amateur's Handbook, which continued to be updated and published until the mid-1980s.

== Early life ==
Collins was born in South Bend, Indiana, to Captain Thomas Jefferson and Margaret Ann (Roller) Collins. He attended public schools and graduated from the Old University of Chicago, a Baptist school which preceded the present University of Chicago. His brother was author Dr. Thomas Byard Collins. After graduating, he began working for the Thomson-Houston Electric Company in Chicago in 1888. He married Evelyn Bandy on June 28, 1897, and they had a son, Virgil Dewey Collins, who also became an author, sharing writing credits on some of his father's books. Collins resided at a summer home called "The Antlers" in Rockland County, New York, in the hamlet of Congers, and had a second residence in Florida. His winter residence was New York City, and he died in Nyack, New York.

== Wireless telegraphy ==
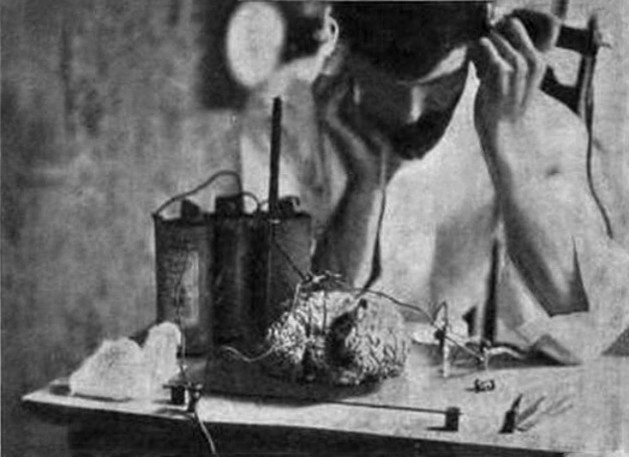
Collins conducting experiment to use a human brain as a radio wave detector

Collins professional interests focused on radio, an exciting technology which was in its early stage during his lifetime. Heinrich Hertz had discovered radio waves in 1887, and Guglielmo Marconi developed the first practical radiotelegraph transmitters and receivers in 1895. Collins became an expert in radio technology, writing many books on the subject, and conducting research on improving radio components.

An unusual example were his experiments in using brain tissue to detect radio waves. The first radio receivers prior to 1904 used a primitive device called a coherer to detect the radio waves. The poor performance of the coherer led to much research to find a better radio wave detector. Collins was intrigued by reports of people "predicting weather" by aches and pains in their body, and examples of lightning strikes, which were strong sources of radio waves, causing convulsions in nearby people who were not actually struck. Since the brain was known to operate electrically, Collins thought it might be sensitive to radio waves. He applied DC current from a battery to two electrodes in dissected animal brains, causing a small current through the tissue, as in a coherer. Then he radiated the brain with pulses of radio waves from a Hertzian spark radio transmitter, and listened with earphones to the circuit. If the radio waves caused changes in the conductivity of the neural tissue, it would cause transient changes in the current, which would be audible as "clicks" in the earphones. His research culminated in experiments on a fresh human brain from a cadaver. Collins claimed that the brain had a 'cohering' effect, its conductivity changed when irradiated. However, other researchers were unable to reproduce the effect.

== Wireless telephony ==
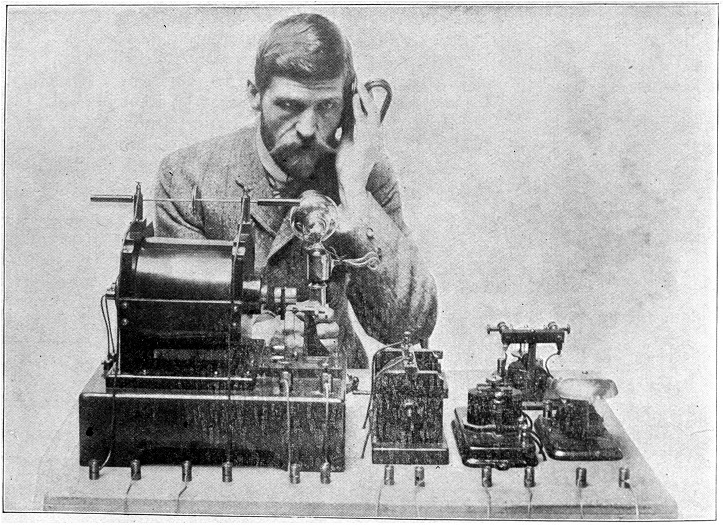
Collins demonstrating an induction wireless telephone (circa 1903)

The "spark" radio transmitters during Collins time could not transmit sound (audio) as modern AM and FM radio transmitters do. This was because the discharge of a spark cannot produce continuous waves, but only damped waves. Instead they transmitted information by telegraphy, the operator turned the transmitter off and on by tapping on a switch called a telegraph key to produce different length pulses of damped radio waves, to spell out text messages in Morse code. By the last years of the century, many wireless researchers such as Reginald Fessenden, Ernst Ruhmer, William Dubilier, Quirino Majorana, and Valdemar Poulsen were working to develop continuous wave transmitters which could be modulated to carry sound, radiotelephony.

Collins began researching the topic on his own in 1898. In November 1899, the American Wireless Telephone and Telegraph Company, headquartered in Philadelphia, Pennsylvania, was founded by stock promoter Dr. Gustav P. Gehring as the first American radio communications firm. Initially Collins acted as that company's primary technical advisor, however, he soon had a falling-out and left the firm, even demanding that his photograph in a company prospectus be altered to make him unrecognizable.

Collins returned to doing his own research, investigating, in turn, wireless telephone systems that employed conduction, induction, and finally radio waves. He established a small laboratory at No. 132 South Sixth street in Philadelphia, forming a developmental company that initially was privately financed and did not sell stock to the public. After doing initial tests within a bowl of water, he reported that he then made steady, although somewhat limited, progress with the conduction and induction approaches, achieving transmission distances of 60 meters (200 feet) in 1899, 1.5 kilometers (0.93 miles) across the Delaware River in 1900, and 5 kilometers (3.1 miles) in 1902. That same year he constructed two experimental stations at Rockland Lake, New York, separated by 1.5 kilometers (0.93 miles), that successfully established two-way communication. In 1903, he made short-distance tests in the Hudson River in New York City, aboard the ferryboats John G. McCullough and Ridgewood, and in July of that year predicted that "in a comparatively short space of time I am confident I shall telephone across the ocean".

Collins' conduction and induction wireless telephone apparatus was similar to that employed by Alexander Graham Bell, Amos Dolbear and Nathan Stubblefield. Bell's work never went beyond the demonstration stage, and Dolbear's patent, controlled by the American Wireless Telephone and Telegraph Company, was ruled by the U.S. courts be largely impractical. In 1902 Stubblefield sold the rights to his system to the newly formed Wireless Telephone Company of America, and by August that company's advertisements stated that "Nathan Stubblefield and Prof. A. Frederick Collins are now working together for the sole benefit of that company", and there were plans to "license subsidiary companies in each state of the Union". However, Stubblefield had actually withdrawn from the firm in June, due to his concerns that it was primarily a fraudulent stock promotion scheme.

In May 1903, Collins formed the Collins Marine Wireless Telephone Company, which was later renamed the Collins Wireless Telephone Company, and served as technical director until 1910. Despite Collins' initial optimism, he had no more success than the others in developing a commercial system using conduction or induction transmissions, due to the inherent limitations of these technologies. He next began developing a radiotelephone that employed continuous-wave radio signals. In 1904, Danish inventor Valdemar Poulsen had introduced the arc-transmitter, which, unlike the intermittent pulses produced by spark transmitters, created steady signals that could be used for amplitude modulated (AM) audio transmissions. Poulsen had sold the U.S. rights to his patents to the Federal Telegraph Company, but Collins claimed that he had independently begun research on the same idea in 1902.

Collins was granted U.S. patent 814,942 on March 13, 1906, for an arc-transmitter improvement which separated the telephone microphone circuit from the arc circuit, to avoid the problem of the arc current burning out the microphone. Although this was merely an incremental improvement on existing arc-transmitter technology, the company's stock promotion advertisements claimed this patent was "a broad one, covering the fundamental principles for transmitting and receiving articulate speech without connecting wires" that was supposedly "considered by the highest authorities on patent law to be one of the strongest to be issued since the one granted to Bell in 1876". (Early purchasers of Bell telephone stock had reaped fortunes, so it was a common tactic for early radio company stock promotions, aimed at impressionable "get-rich-quick" buyers, to suggest that similar increases would occur).

The electromagnetic radiation (radio waves) produced by arc-transmitters was created by an electric arc burning between two electrodes. In Collins' case the electrodes rotated in opposite directions, to provide even wear of their surfaces, thus was called a "revolving oscillating arc". Collins also developed multiple unit water-cooled microphones which could carry heavier currents of 8 to 10 amperes. For a receiver, he used a thermo-electric detector of his own design.

Collins began making demonstration radiotelephone transmissions from his lab at 51 Clinton Street in Newark, New Jersey, that were sent to increasingly distant locations. On July 9, 1908, a test was heard at the Singer Building in New York City, 19 kilometers (12 miles) away. Transmissions over the next two days were reportedly received in Congers, New York, 56 kilometers (35 miles) distant, and Philadelphia, a distance of 130 kilometers (81 miles). After witnessing an October 1908 demonstration at the New York Electrical Show, Guglielmo Marconi was quoted as saying: "Wireless telephony is an accomplished fact, and to Mr. Collins is due the credit of its invention... The clarity of the transmitted voice is marvelous." In 1909, Collins claimed that his company had established four radiotelephone links operating simultaneously between Portland, Maine, and a nearby island, although there is little evidence that this was true. That same year he exhibited his wireless telephone at the Alaska–Yukon–Pacific Exposition and was awarded a gold medal.

Despite Collins' reported successes, his efforts actually fell short of creating a commercially viable radiotelephone. This was also true for other experimenters doing arc-transmitter radiotelephone research during this period, including Lee de Forest and Charles Herrold. Despite their best efforts, arc-transmitters would prove to be too unrefined to be usable for audio transmissions, and a successful radiotelephone would not be realized until vacuum-tube transmitters were developed in the mid-1910s.

In December 1909, the Collins Wireless Telephone Company was merged with three others—the Pacific Wireless Telegraph Company, the Clark Wireless Telegraph Company, and the Massie Wireless Telegraph Company—to form the Continental Wireless Telephone and Telegraph Company, with Collins the new company's Technical Director. Advertisements claimed that Continental was in the process of creating a nationwide service. However, in view of the increasingly shady reputation of its officers, both Walter Massie and Thomas Clark soon withdrew from participation.

=== Mail fraud prosecution ===
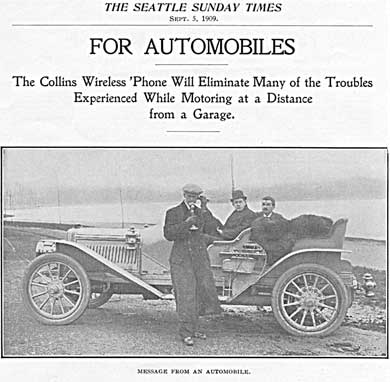
Advertisement for the Collins wireless phone for automobiles.

Collins participated in demonstrations promoting stock sales, which over time included extravagant and misleading claims. A common company tactic was to set up a demonstration at a hotel in a targeted town, and, after successfully talking between two rooms using the short-range induction system, claim that a community-wide radiotelephone exchange had also been perfected, and would be installed pending financing by local stock sales. These tests were widely publicized, featuring promotional photographs of prominent persons, including William Jennings Bryan and U.S. President William Howard Taft, using the company's devices. The company also claimed that soon "every auto will be provided with a portable wireless telephone". However, the radiotelephone systems were never actually constructed.

Concerned by excesses in the radio communications industry, the U.S. federal government instituted a series of prosecutions, and in June 1910 inspectors from the United States Postal Department began making arrests, beginning with officials of the notorious United Wireless Telegraph Company. In December 1911 Collins and three of his associates were arrested, and charged with mail fraud in connection with the promotion of both Collins Wireless and its Continental Wireless successor. The indictment charges included overstating the scope of the company's patents, and also fraudulently claiming that its radiotelephone equipment had been perfected to the point that it was ready for widespread commercial deployment. In a trial that ended in early 1913, Collins was one of the three defendants found guilty, and was sentenced to three years' imprisonment, although he would be released after serving one year.

== Publications ==
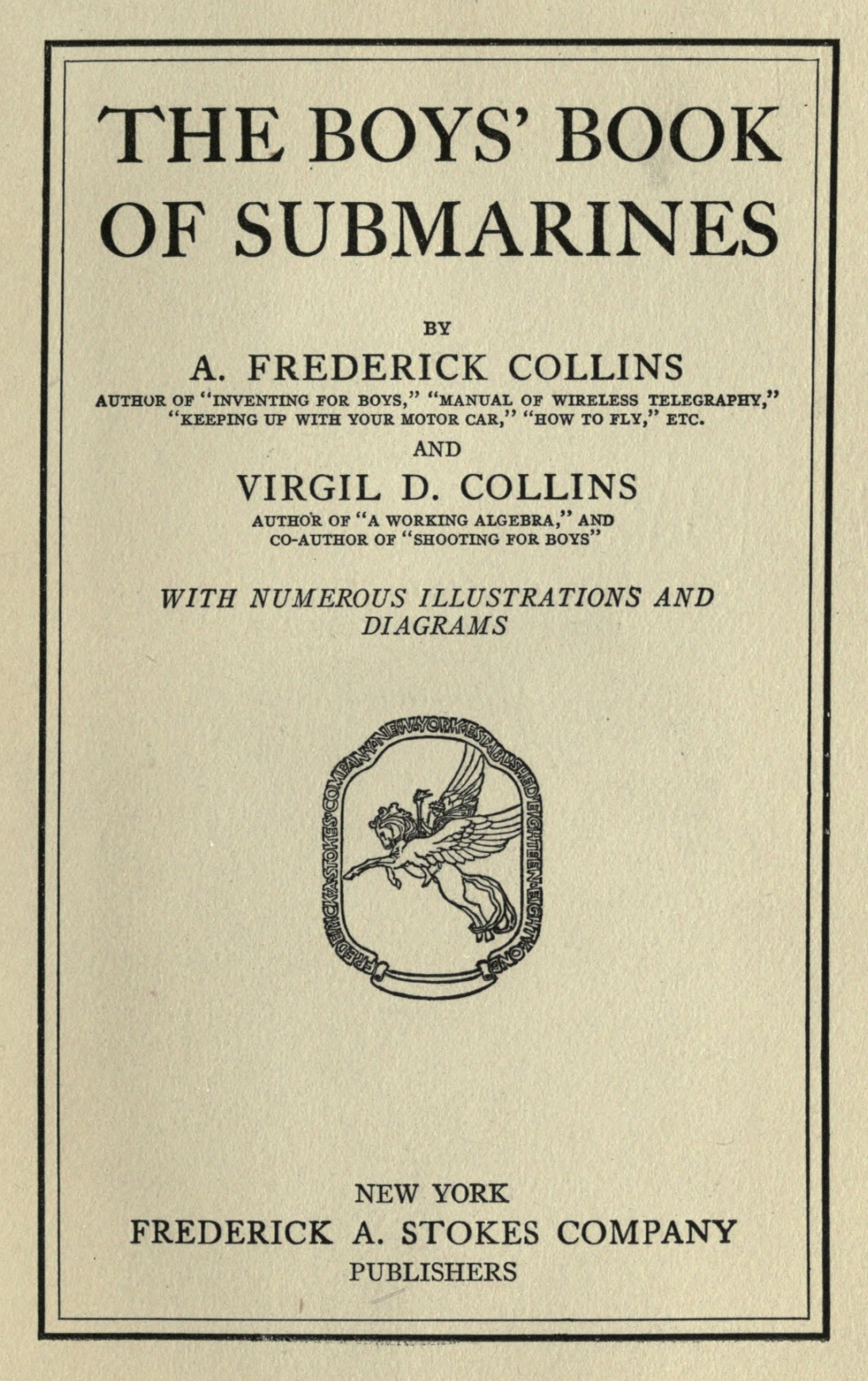
Cover of The Boys' Book of Submarines.

Collins began his writing career in 1901, and his articles about wireless telephony appeared in Electrical World, Scientific American, Encyclopedia Americana, and other encyclopedias. He also wrote numerous technical articles and books on wireless telegraphy and telephony in the first two decades of the 20th century. His 1913 Manual of Wireless Telegraphy and Telephony provided a detailed and illustrated explanation of his electric arc wireless telephone transmitter and receiver, along with a general coverage of the state of the art.

Following his release from prison in 1914, Collins did no further work as an electrical engineer. Embittered by his treatment, in 1917 his wife, Evelyn, filed for a separation, stating that Collins "had come back to freedom... with his disposition ruined", "soured against the world, soured against even his benefactors, and soured against her", and engaging in "long harangues and tirades of invectives against the world in general and the United States government in particular". However, he eventually re-established himself, and, appearing as himself in one of his juvenile novels, proclaimed that although he had suffered "hard falls" and was "stoop-shouldered" from "the weight of his own tragedies", he was persevering because he was "a bit battle scarred but my skin is as thick as that of a rhinoceros". He continued authoring an impressive number of books covering a variety of topics, many intended for younger readers. In particular, he was an enthusiastic proponent of amateur radio, writing in the 1915 The Book of Wireless that "All you need to become a member of the great and growing army of wireless boys is the desire to own a station, and the rest is easy", while offering to personally answer any letters requesting assistance with technical problems. In 1922 his The Radio Amateur's Hand Book was introduced, which was reprinted in at least 15 revised editions over the next 61 years.

In the fiction arena, his three-part "Jack Heaton" adventure series reviewed its title character's exploits as a Wireless Operator (1919), Oil Prospector (1920) and Gold Seeker (1921). However, most of his works were non-fiction. By 1919 his books included Inventing for Boys, Handicraft for Boys, and The Boys' Book of Submarines. The 1922 edition of The Book of Wireless Telegraph and Telephone lists 22 additional titles, ranging from Boys' and Girls' Book of Outdoor Games to numerous scientific and technical subjects, including The Amateur Chemist and Gas, Gasoline and Oil Engines. Many of his books, such as The Boy Scientist, (1925) had comprehensive illustrations and few equations, with an emphasis on "hands-on" experimentation, at a level intended for high school students. After discussing the "Einstein Theory," Collins tells his readers how to build a spectroscope, a radio receiver, and an x-ray machine for home experimentation. In 1941, a book review reported that "A. Frederick Collins has to his credit some 37 'self-help' and practical books ranking from chemistry and electricity and the stars to household mechanics, your car, and gardening." He eventually wrote about 100 books on scientific and technical subjects, hobbies, and sports, plus over 500 articles in technical and scientific magazines and journals.

== Legacy ==
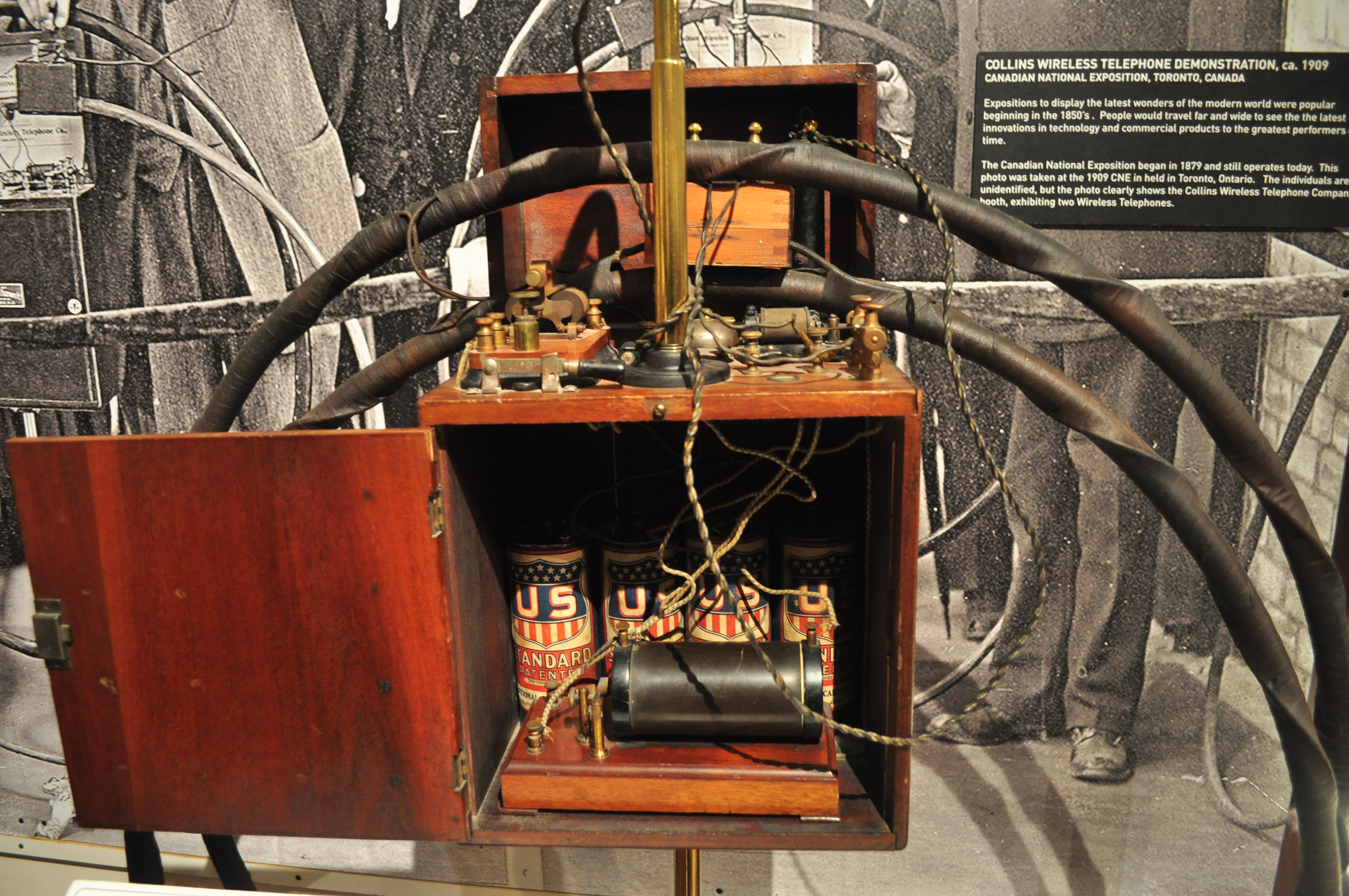
The only surviving Collins Wireless Telephone, c. 1908, SPARK Museum of Electrical Invention, Bellingham, Washington, U.S.

Collins' writings played an important role in disseminating information about early radio advances (then known as "wireless telegraphy and telephony"), and, in the foreword to 1922 edition of The Radio Amateur's Hand Book, he included "Historian of Wireless 1901–1910" among his accomplishments. (He also claimed the title of "Inventor of the Wireless Telephone 1899"). Donald McNicol, who would later serve as president of the Institute of Radio Engineers, stated that Collins' "How to Construct An Efficient Wireless Telegraph Apparatus at Small Cost", which appeared in a 1902 issue of the Scientific American Supplement, "did more to introduce the art of amateur radio than anything else that had appeared". McNicols later expanded his remarks, writing: "amateur experimenters in wireless were at that early date provided with descriptive text enabling them to set up equipment for the duplication of experiments performed by the foremost workers. Undoubtedly Collins's articles on wireless started many of the amateurs and engineers on the road to whatever success they achieved".

Alan MacDiarmid, the 2000 Nobel Prize Laureate in chemistry, said that Collins' 1924 book The Boy Chemist so inspired him as a boy in New Zealand that he kept renewing it from the public library for almost a full year in order to complete all the experiments.

== Affiliations and memberships ==
In 1907, Collins political affiliation was reported to be Republican, and he also presented lectures for the New York Board of Education. In the United States he was a member of the American Institute of Electrical Engineers, while in the United Kingdom was a member of the Royal Aero Club and a Fellow of the Royal Astronomical Society.

== See also ==
- Massie Wireless Station – Massie's company, operating this station, merged with Collin's company
