= Kentish Artillery =

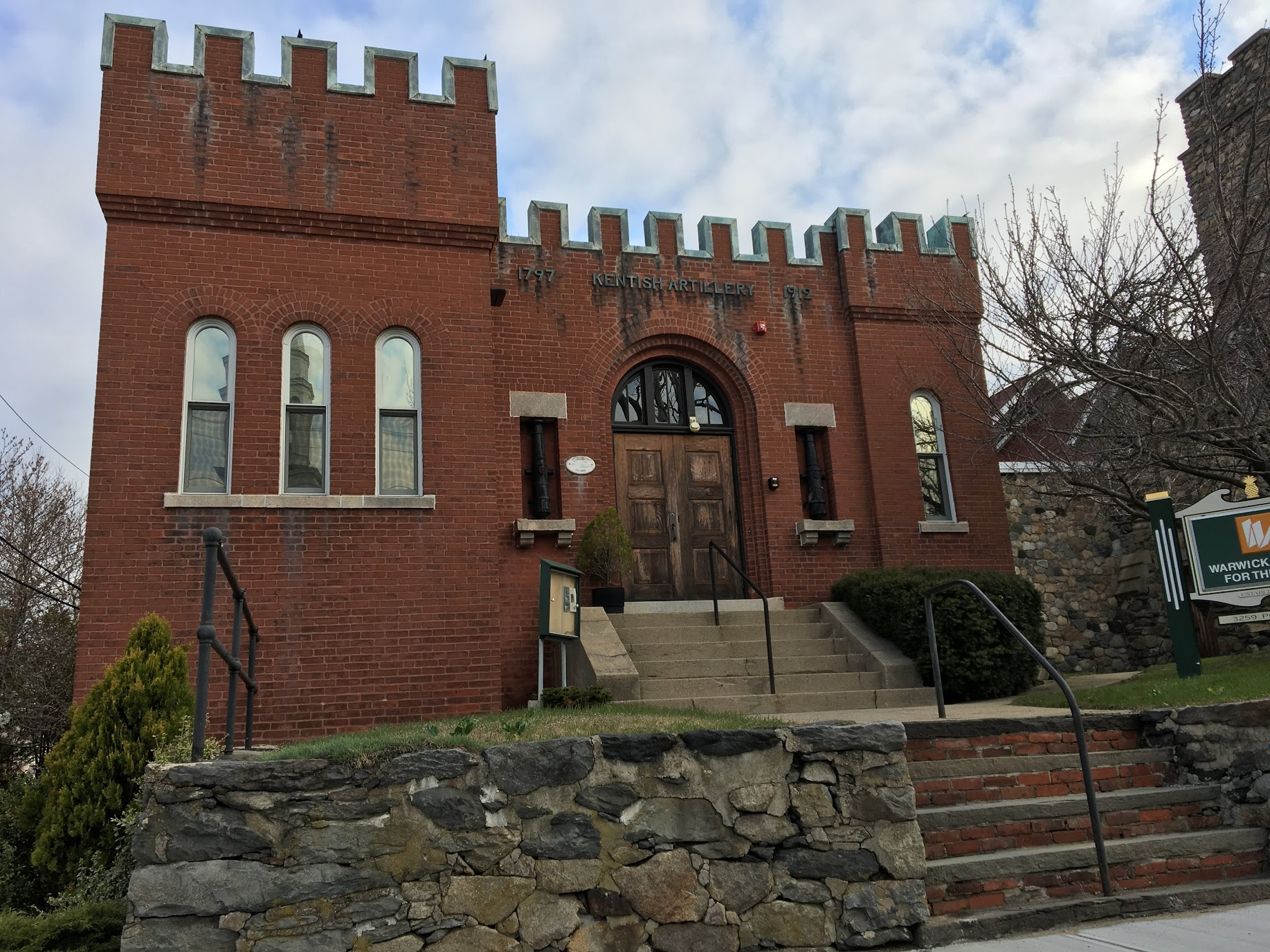
Kentish Artillery Armory, 2018

The Kentish Artillery (originally Kentish Light Artillery) was a military organization in Rhode Island originating in the 18th century.

== History ==
It was officially chartered by the Rhode Island General Assembly in 1797 as the Kentish Light Artillery and underwent a name change to the Kentish Artillery in 1804. The unit was activated during the War of 1812 but later disbanded.

In 1853, the charter was renewed, and an armory was constructed in the village of Apponaug in 1854. At the start of the American Civil War, Charles P. Williams, who rose to the rank of captain in the company in his early adulthood. attempted to enlist his company with the First Regiment in Providence, but due to the regiment being at full capacity, they returned home. Williams then enlisted as a private and fought in the Battle of Bull Run. During the war, the Kentish Artillery ultimately provided three companies of troops.

In 1886, the Rhode Island Supreme Court held that in a case in which the militia unit was suing a former member to recover the uniform that had been issued to him, the judge of the Justice Court of Warwick was ineligible to hear the case, because he too was a member of the unit.

The original armory, built in the Greek Revival style, was destroyed by fire in 1911. A new one was constructed by William R. Walker & Son and built in 1912. In 1926, the Kentish Artillery was among several Rhode Island military organizations authorized to attend the Sesquicentennial Exposition in Philadelphia. As of the early 20th century, Rhode Island maintained several military units active under their original charters, including "the Kentish Artillery (chartered in 1797), the Newport Artillery, the Kentish Guards, and the United Train of Artillery".

As of 2022, the armory building constructed in 1912 is on the National Register of Historic Places, still stands and houses the Warwick Center for the Arts.

== See also ==
- Armory of the Kentish Guards
