= Kent County Courthouse (Rhode Island) =

- U.S. National Register of Historic Places
- U.S. Historic district – Contributing property
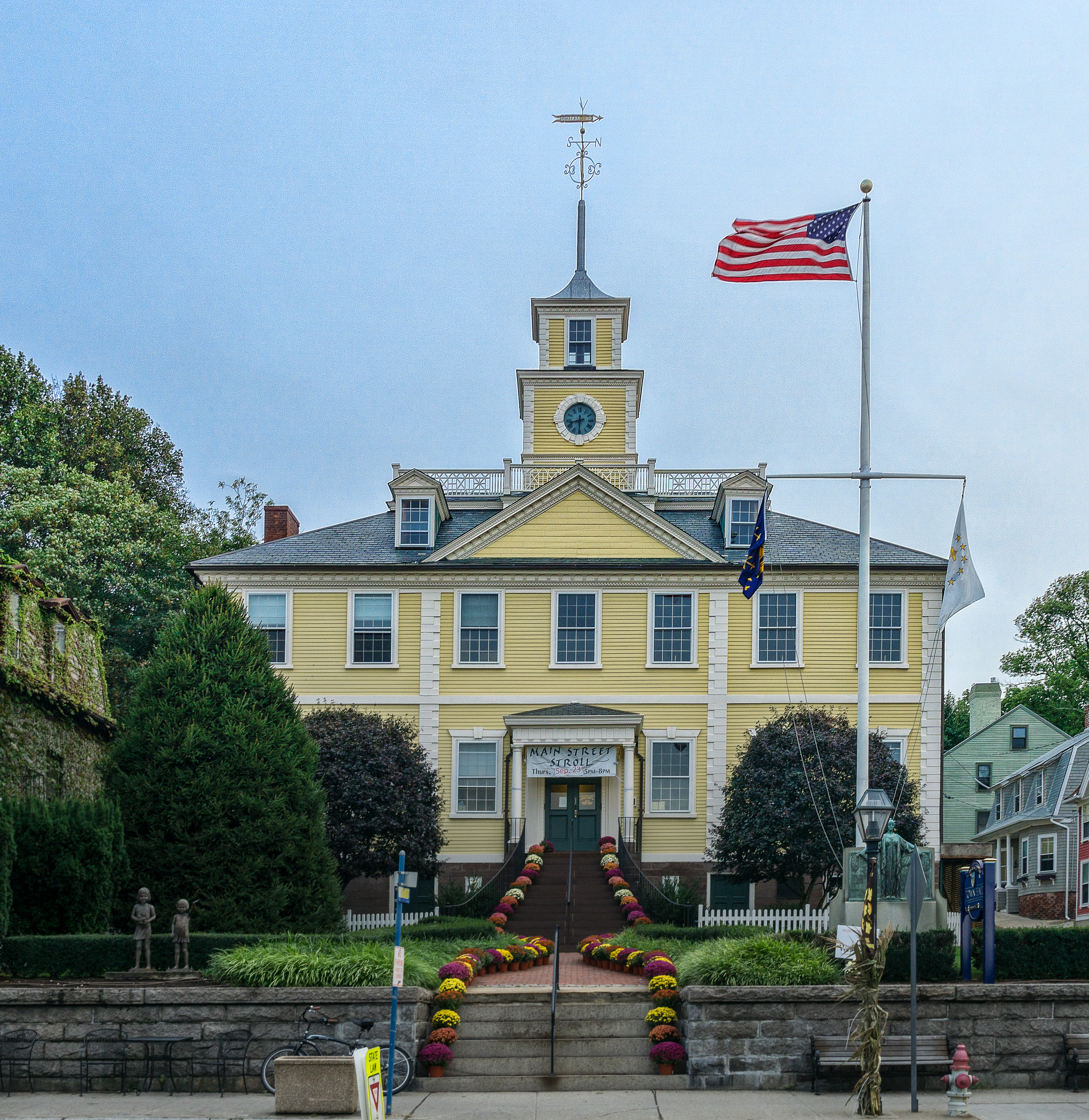
- Front of the courthouse

- Location within Rhode Island Location within the United States
- Interactive map showing the location for Kent County Courthouse
- Location: 127 Main St., East Greenwich, Rhode Island
- Coordinates: 41°39′39″N 71°27′2″W
- Area: 1 acre (0.40 ha)
- Built: 1803
- Architect: Oliver Wickes, William R. Walker & Son
- Architectural style: Federal
- Part of: East Greenwich Historic District (ID74000036)
- NRHP reference No.: 70000013

Significant dates
- Added to NRHP: April 28, 1970
- Designated CP: June 13, 1974

The Kent County Courthouse, now the East Greenwich Town Hall, is a historic court building at 127 Main Street in East Greenwich, Rhode Island.

Kent County was set off from Providence County in 1750. The same year, a courthouse was constructed in East Greenwich, then the largest town in the new county. By 1799 the courthouse was too small, and the state legislature appointed a committee for the construction of a new building. The old building was sold and dismantled, and a new courthouse built on the site in 1804–05. It was designed and built by Revolutionary war veteran and contractor Oliver Wickes.

Rhode Island had an unusual "rotating legislature" from 1759 to 1901. In order to keep state government local, the legislature occupied each county seat on a rotating schedule. In 1854, only the buildings in Providence and Newport were used. In 1901, when the new Rhode Island State House was first occupied, Providence became the state capitol, and the buildings in Bristol, South Kingstown, and East Greenwich were turned over to the counties.

By the early twentieth century, the courthouse was in need of modernization. In 1908 the Providence architectural firm of William R. Walker & Son was hired to renovate the structure. However, as soon as work had begun, it was revealed that the building's structural integrity had been compromised over the years. The courthouse was gutted and the interior was completely rebuilt in the Colonial Revival manner. The work was completed in 1909.

In 1974, a new courthouse was built in Warwick. The building in East Greenwich was repurposed as the East Greenwich Town Hall, replacing the old shingle-style town hall, formerly a block north on Main Street. The probate court continues to meet in the building, making it the oldest active courthouse in the state.

== See also ==
- List of the oldest courthouses in the United States
- National Register of Historic Places listings in Kent County, Rhode Island
