= Armory of the Kentish Guards =

- U.S. National Register of Historic Places
- U.S. Historic district – Contributing property
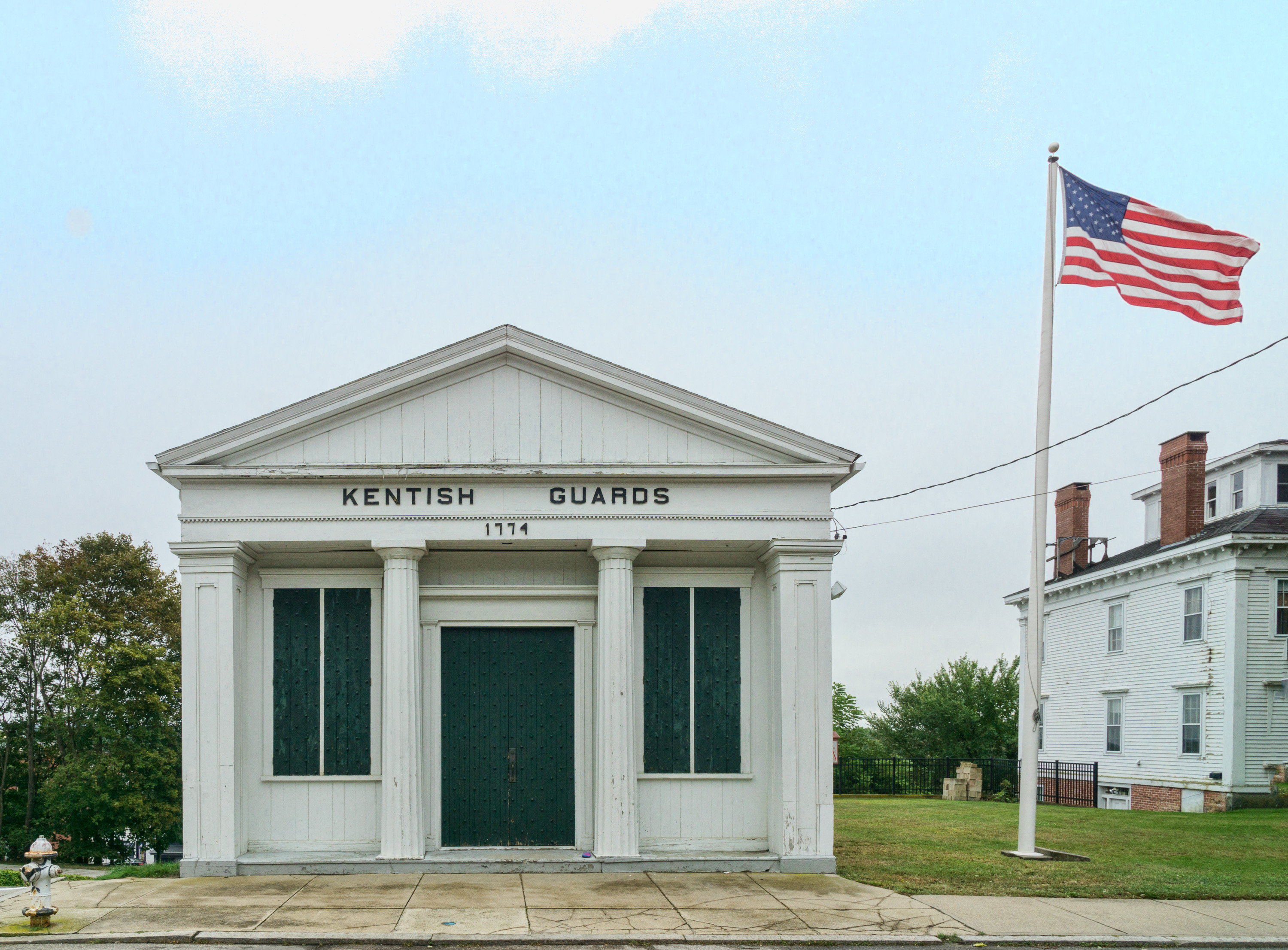

- Location within Rhode Island Location within the United States
- Location: 1774 Armory Street, East Greenwich, Rhode Island
- Coordinates: 41°39′39.6462″N 71°27′3.7974″W
- Built: 1842
- Architectural style: Greek Revival
- Part of: East Greenwich Historic District (ID74000036)
- NRHP reference No.: 70000012

Significant dates
- Added to NRHP: April 28, 1970
- Designated CP: June 13, 1974

The Armory of the Kentish Guards is a historic armory at Armory and Peirce Streets in East Greenwich, Rhode Island and is currently home to the Kentish Guards, a historic Rhode Island Independent Military Organization.

== History ==
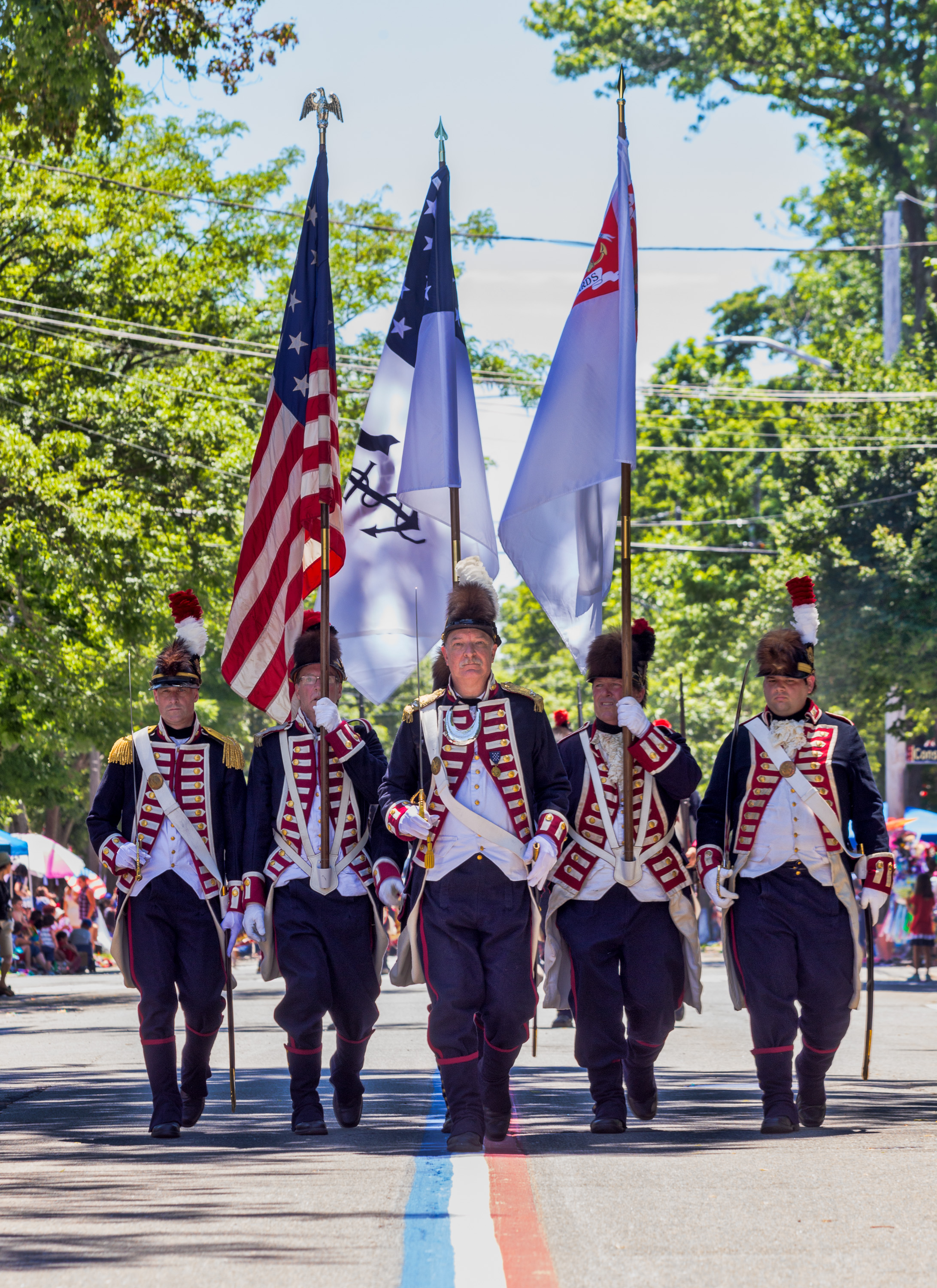
Kentish Guards at the 2017 Bristol Fourth of July Parade

The Kentish Guards were founded in 1774, just prior to the American Revolution. The Greek Revival armory building was constructed in 1843 with a $1,000 public grant from the Rhode Island General Assembly to the Kentish Guards for their aid in the Dorr Rebellion in 1842. In 1970 the building was added to the National Register of Historic Places.

== Collections ==
The Armory contains a gallery of pictures featuring former members of the Guard. The original charter hangs on the wall as a lasting reminder and a memorial to those men who organized the Kentish Guards in 1774.

== Visiting ==
The Kentish Guards Armory may be visited on Tuesdays, when the militia company meets, and Wednesdays, when the fife & drum corps rehearses, both around 8:00 pm (except during holiday periods) and by special appointment.

== Notable Kentish Guards ==
- James Mitchell Varnum, Colonel and First Commander of the Kentish Guards, general during American Revolution
- Nathanael Greene, private in the Kentish Guards (rank limited due to a limp and lack of formal education), Major General during American Revolution
- Christopher Greene, legislator, soldier

== See also ==
- Artillery Company of Newport
- Col. Micah Whitmarsh House
- Kentish Artillery
- National Register of Historic Places listings in Kent County, Rhode Island
- Rhode Island Naval Militia
- Rhode Island State Guard
