= List of Rhode Island locations by per capita income =

Rhode Island is the 17th-wealthiest state in the United States of America, with a per capita income of $21,688 (2000) and a personal per capita income of $31,916 (2003). Its median household income is $42,090 (2000), ranked seventeenth in the country, and its median family income is $52,781 (2000), the seventeenth-highest in the country. The median value of an owner-occupied housing unit is $133,000 (2000), ranked fifteenth in the country.

The city of Newport was known for its wealth in the 20th century. However, the actual town of Newport is not as wealthy as many think: its median household income is only a mere $40,669, actually below the national median (and only the forty-second-highest in the state). Despite this, the town is home to many large estates and is a popular summer home location for the wealthy. Jamestown, located west of Newport, is actually the richest community in the state. Other notable affluent areas include Barrington and East and West Greenwich. Besides these areas, Rhode Island is mostly a middle-income state, as a majority of the population lives in the urban city Providence. 69% of Rhode Island places do however have per capita incomes higher than the national average, one of the highest percentages of any state, but 11.9% of the population lives below the poverty line.

1.9% percent of Rhode Island households have annual incomes of $200,000+, and 11.4% have incomes of $100,000 or more. On the contrary, 10.7% have incomes of less than $10,000 and 42.0% less than $34,999.

== Rhode Island counties ranked by per capita income ==
Note: Data is from the 2010 United States Census Data and the 2006-2010 American Community Survey 5-Year Estimates.

Rank	County	Per capita income	Median household income	Median family income	Population	Number of households
1	Newport	$36,994	$67,239	$82,477	82,888	34,911
2	Bristol	$35,588	$68,333	$87,781	49,875	19,150
3	Washington	$34,737	$70,285	$87,999	126,979	49,177
4	Kent	$31,221	$61,088	$77,100	166,158	68,645
5	Providence	$25,169	$48,500	$61,265	626,667	241,717

== Rhode Island places ranked by per capita income ==
Rank	Place name	Type of place	County	Per capita income	Median house- hold income	Median family income	Population	Number of households	MSA
1	Barrington	Town	Bristol County	$102,664	$63,073	$77,990	5,622	2,359	Providence--Fall River--Warwick, RI--MA
2	Jamestown	Town	Newport County	$97,593	$70,063	$90,221	12,948	4,960	Providence—Fall River—Warwick, RI—MA
3	East Greenwich	Town	Kent County	$95,881	$74,591	$84,657	16,819	6,011	Providence—Fall River—Warwick, RI—MA
4	Little Compton	Town	Newport County	$32,513	$55,368	$62,750	3,593	1,475	Providence—Fall River—Warwick, RI—MA
5	New Shoreham	Town	Washington County	$29,188	$44,779	$59,844	1,010	472	
6	Cumberland Hill	CDP	Providence County	$28,879	$57,697	$68,361	7,738	3,054	Providence—Fall River—Warwick, RI—MA
7	Narragansett	Town	Washington County	$28,194	$50,363	$67,571	16,361	6,846	Providence—Fall River—Warwick, RI—MA
8	Portsmouth	Town	Newport County	$28,161	$58,835	$68,577	17,149	6,758	
9	North Kingstown	Town	Washington County	$28,139	$60,027	$69,559	26,326	10,154	Providence—Fall River—Warwick, RI—MA
10	Scituate	Town	Providence County	$28,092	$60,788	$67,593	10,324	3,780	Providence—Fall River—Warwick, RI—MA
11	Narragansett Pier	CDP	Washington County	$26,811	$39,918	$65,864	3,671	1,745	Providence—Fall River—Warwick, RI—MA
12	Lincoln	Town	Providence County	$26,779	$47,815	$61,257	20,898	8,243	Providence—Fall River—Warwick, RI—MA
13	Middletown	Town	Newport County	$25,857	$51,075	$57,322	17,334	6,993	
14	West Greenwich	Town	Kent County	$25,750	$65,725	$71,332	5,085	1,749	Providence—Fall River—Warwick, RI—MA
15	Charlestown	Town	Washington County	$25,642	$51,491	$56,866	7,859	3,178	Providence—Fall River—Warwick, RI—MA
16	Cumberland	Town	Providence County	$25,592	$54,656	$63,194	31,840	12,198	Providence—Fall River—Warwick, RI—MA
17	Exeter	Town	Washington County	$25,530	$64,452	$74,157	6,045	2,085	Providence—Fall River—Warwick, RI—MA
18	Newport	City	Newport County	$25,441	$40,669	$54,116	26,475	11,566	
19	North Smithfield	Town	Providence County	$25,031	$58,602	$67,331	10,618	3,954	Providence—Fall River—Warwick, RI—MA
20	Greenville	CDP	Providence County	$24,770	$56,036	$66,832	8,626	3,302	Providence—Fall River—Warwick, RI—MA
21	Wakefield-Peacedale	CDP	Washington County	$24,191	$50,313	$61,541	8,468	3,221	Providence—Fall River—Warwick, RI—MA
22	Westerly	Town	Washington County	$24,092	$44,613	$53,165	22,966	9,402	New London--Norwich, CT--RI
23	Hopkinton	Town	Washington County	$23,835	$52,181	$59,143	7,836	2,965	Providence—Fall River—Warwick, RI—MA
24	South Kingstown	Town	Washington County	$23,827	$56,325	$67,912	27,921	9,268	Providence—Fall River—Warwick, RI—MA
25	Warwick	City	Kent County	$23,410	$46,483	$56,225	85,808	35,517	Providence—Fall River—Warwick, RI—MA
26	Smithfield	Town	Providence County	$23,224	$55,621	$66,320	20,613	7,194	Providence—Fall River—Warwick, RI—MA
27	Glocester	Town	Providence County	$22,914	$57,537	$62,679	9,948	3,559	Providence—Fall River—Warwick, RI—MA
28	Tiverton	Town	Newport County	$22,866	$49,977	$58,917	15,260	6,077	Providence—Fall River—Warwick, RI—MA
29	Warren	Town	Bristol County	$22,448	$41,285	$52,824	11,360	4,708	Providence—Fall River—Warwick, RI—MA
30	Richmond	Town	Washington County	$22,351	$59,840	$64,688	7,222	2,537	Providence—Fall River—Warwick, RI—MA
31	Foster	Town	Providence County	$22,148	$59,673	$63,657	4,274	1,535	Providence—Fall River—Warwick, RI—MA
32	Coventry	Town	Kent County	$22,091	$51,987	$60,315	33,668	12,596	Providence—Fall River—Warwick, RI—MA
33	Cranston	City	Providence County	$21,978	$44,108	$55,241	79,269	30,954	Providence—Fall River—Warwick, RI—MA
34	Harrisville	CDP	Providence County	$21,969	$40,430	$51,141	1,561	655	Providence—Fall River—Warwick, RI—MA
35	Bristol	Town	Bristol County	$21,532	$43,689	$54,656	22,469	8,314	Providence—Fall River—Warwick, RI—MA
36	Johnston	Town	Providence County	$21,440	$43,514	$54,837	28,195	11,197	Providence—Fall River—Warwick, RI—MA
37	Ashaway	CDP	Washington County	$21,149	$47,271	$49,125	1,537	589	Providence—Fall River—Warwick, RI—MA
38	Burrillville	Town	Providence County	$21,096	$52,587	$58,979	15,796	5,559	Providence—Fall River—Warwick, RI—MA
39	Valley Falls	CDP	Providence County	$20,373	$46,163	$52,414	11,599	4,494	Providence—Fall River—Warwick, RI—MA
40	Pascoag	CDP	Providence County	$20,322	$48,778	$54,391	4,742	1,642	Providence—Fall River—Warwick, RI—MA
41	West Warwick	Town	Kent County	$20,250	$39,505	$47,674	29,581	12,498	Providence—Fall River—Warwick, RI—MA
42	East Providence	City	Providence County	$19,527	$39,108	$48,463	48,688	20,530	Providence—Fall River—Warwick, RI—MA
43	Hope Valley	CDP	Washington County	$18,925	$43,264	$47,857	1,649	630	Providence—Fall River—Warwick, RI—MA
44	Pawtucket	City	Providence County	$17,008	$31,775	$39,038	72,958	30,047	Providence—Fall River—Warwick, RI—MA
45	Woonsocket	City	Providence County	$16,223	$30,819	$38,353	43,224	17,750	Providence—Fall River—Warwick, RI—MA
46	Providence	City	Providence County	$15,525	$26,867	$32,058	173,618	62,389	Providence—Fall River—Warwick, RI—MA
47	Melville	CDP	Newport County	$14,789	$37,314	$40,134	2,325	764	
48	Bradford	CDP	Washington County	$14,004	$42,130	$40,370	1,497	482	New London—Norwich, CT—RI
49	North Providence	Town	Providence County	$33,085	$53,792	$31,655	76,543	14,351	Providence—Fall River—Warwick, RI—MA
50	Kingston	CDP	Washington County	$10,952	$56,159	$66,133	5,446	631	Providence—Fall River—Warwick, RI—MA
51	Central Falls	City	Providence County	$10,825	$22,628	$26,844	18,928	6,696	Providence—Fall River—Warwick, RI—MA
