= New England Wireless and Steam Museum =

Museum in Rhode Island, United States

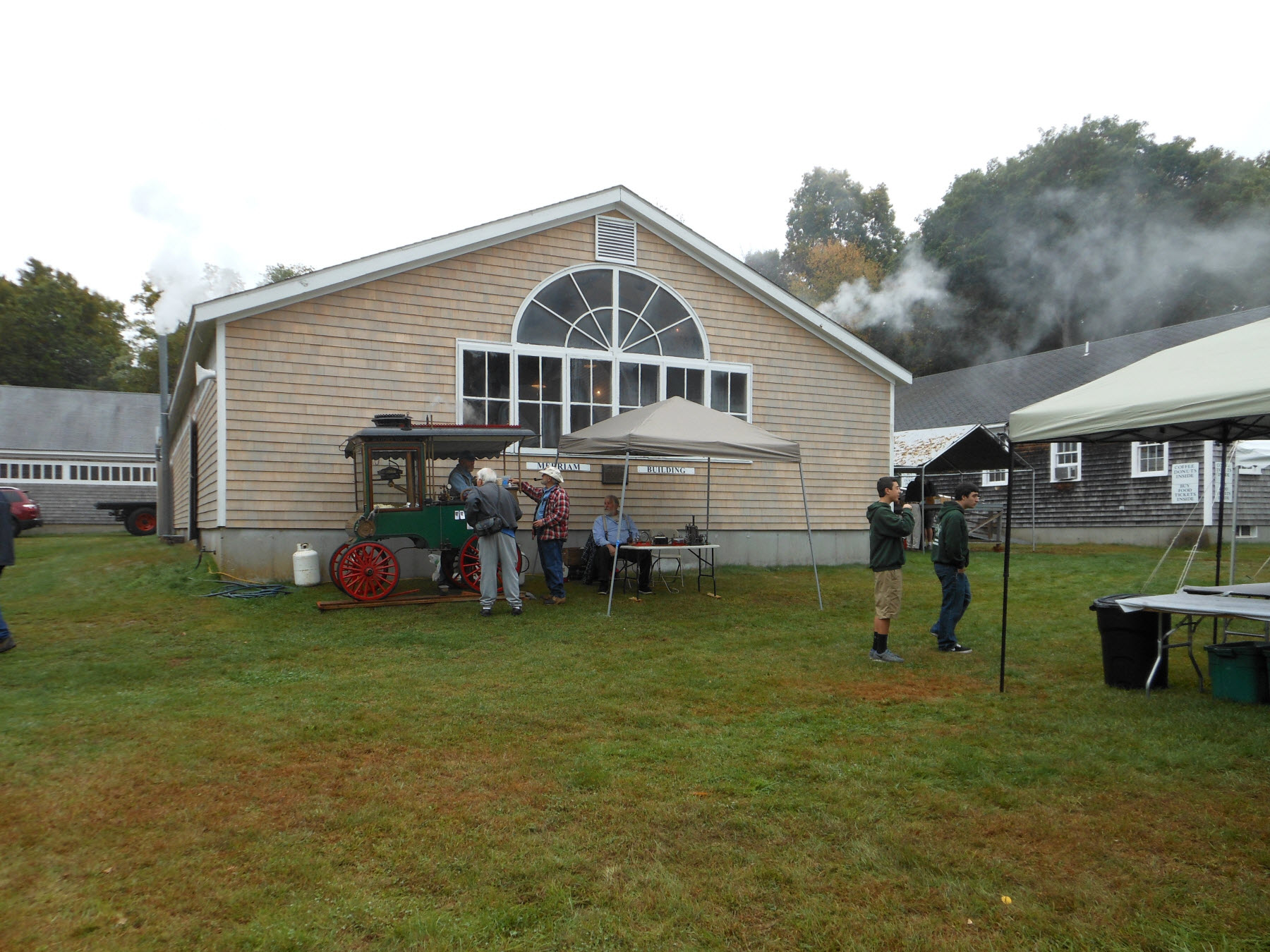
- Established: 1964
- Location: East Greenwich, Rhode Island
- Coordinates: 41°37′27″N 71°30′46″W
- President: Randy Snow
- Website: http://www.newsm.org/

The New England Wireless and Steam Museum is an electrical and mechanical engineering museum at 1300 Frenchtown Road in East Greenwich, Rhode Island, with working steam engines and an early wireless station and technology archives.

The museum was founded in 1964 under the leadership of Robert Merriam. According to the museum's website, the New England Wireless and Steam Museum contains five buildings:

- One museum building contains the wireless collection.
- The Massie Wireless Station, (PJ), was "built in 1907. It is the oldest surviving working wireless station in the world. It was moved to this site from Point Judith, Rhode Island, in 1982 to avoid demolition."
- Another museum building contains "the stationary steam engine collection. This collection includes the only surviving George H. Corliss engine running under steam today."
- The Mayes building houses the Mechanical Engineering library of historic engineering textbooks and the collection of steam engine models.
- A meeting house built in 1822 is used as the assembly hall for the museum. In 1972, the nearby Frenchtown Baptist Church in East Greenwich was going to demolish its building, so it was moved to this site to save the building. The meeting house is part of the Tillinghast Road Historic District and is available to rent for weddings and other events.

The Museum is situated within the Tillinghast Road Historic District. It was designated an engineering history Landmark in 1992 by the American Society of Mechanical Engineers. In 2001 the Massie Wireless Station was added to the National Register of Historic Places.

As of August 2022, the president of the NEWSM board of directors is Randy Snow.

== See also ==
- List of museums in Rhode Island
