= Col. Micah Whitmarsh House =

Historic house in Rhode Island, United States

- U.S. National Register of Historic Places
- U.S. Historic district – Contributing property
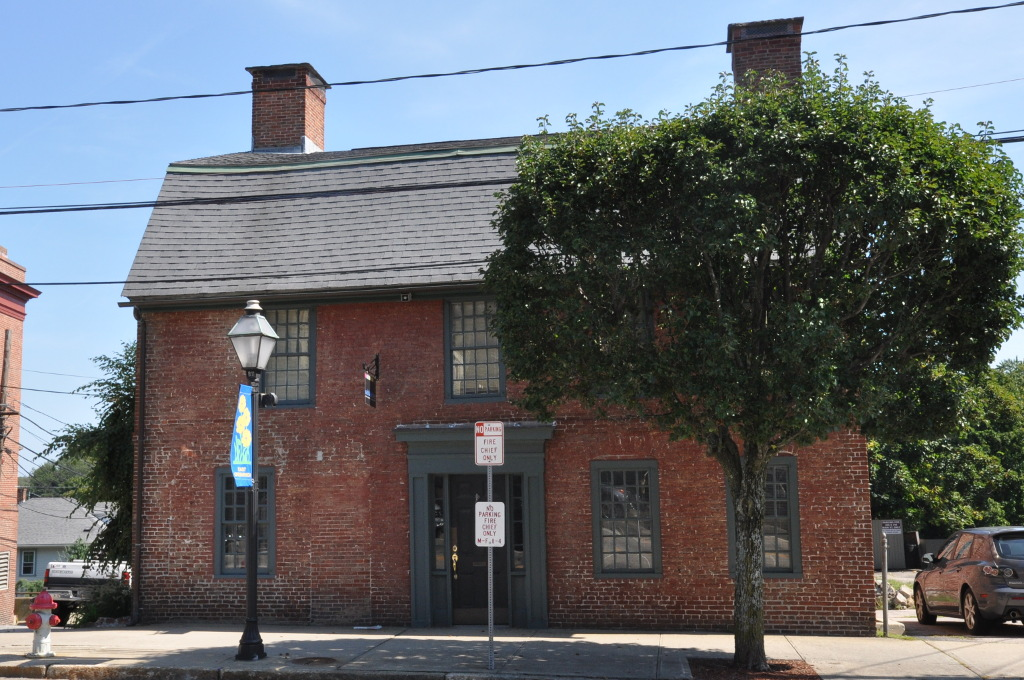

- Location within Rhode Island Location within the United States
- Location: 294 Main Street, East Greenwich, Rhode Island
- Coordinates: 41°39′34″N 71°27′1″W
- Built: 1767
- Architectural style: Greek Revival
- Part of: East Greenwich Historic District (ID74000036)
- NRHP reference No.: 71000017

Significant dates
- Added to NRHP: February 18, 1971
- Designated CP: June 13, 1974

The Colonel Micah Whitmarsh House is an historic house in East Greenwich, Rhode Island. The 2 1/2-story Greek Revival style brick house was built c. 1767-1771 by John Reynolds, and acquired in 1773 by Micah Whitmarsh, a founding member of the local Kentish Guards militia, which are located nearby in the Armory of the Kentish Guards. It is distinctive as the only brick house on Main Street. It has been owned since 1966 by the East Greenwich Historical Society.

The house was listed on the National Register of Historic Places in 1971.

== See also ==
- National Register of Historic Places listings in Kent County, Rhode Island
