= Warwick Center for the Arts =

Coordinates: 41.699222°N 71.457938°W

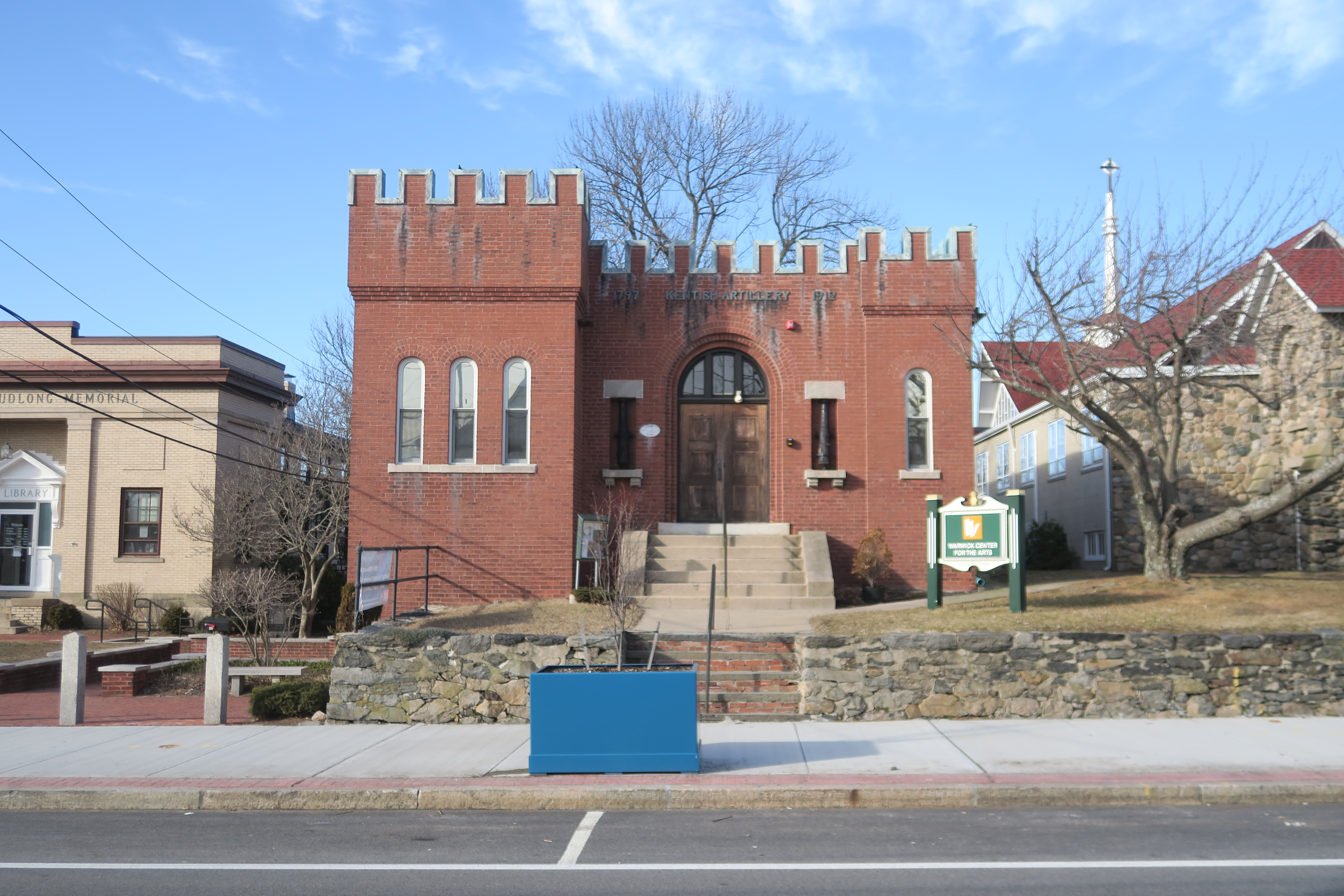
Warwick Center for the Arts in the Kentish Artillery Building

Warwick Center for the Arts, formerly the Warwick Museum of Art, is an art museum in Warwick, Rhode Island, USA.

The Center was founded in 1974 and features exhibits in its art gallery, as well as performances, camps for children, adult classes and comedy shows. The Center changed its name from the Warwick Museum of Art to the Warwick Center for the Arts in 2016. The CEnter is located inside the Kentish Artillery Armory building.
