= East Greenwich Historic District =

Historic district in Rhode Island, United States

- U.S. National Register of Historic Places
- U.S. Historic district
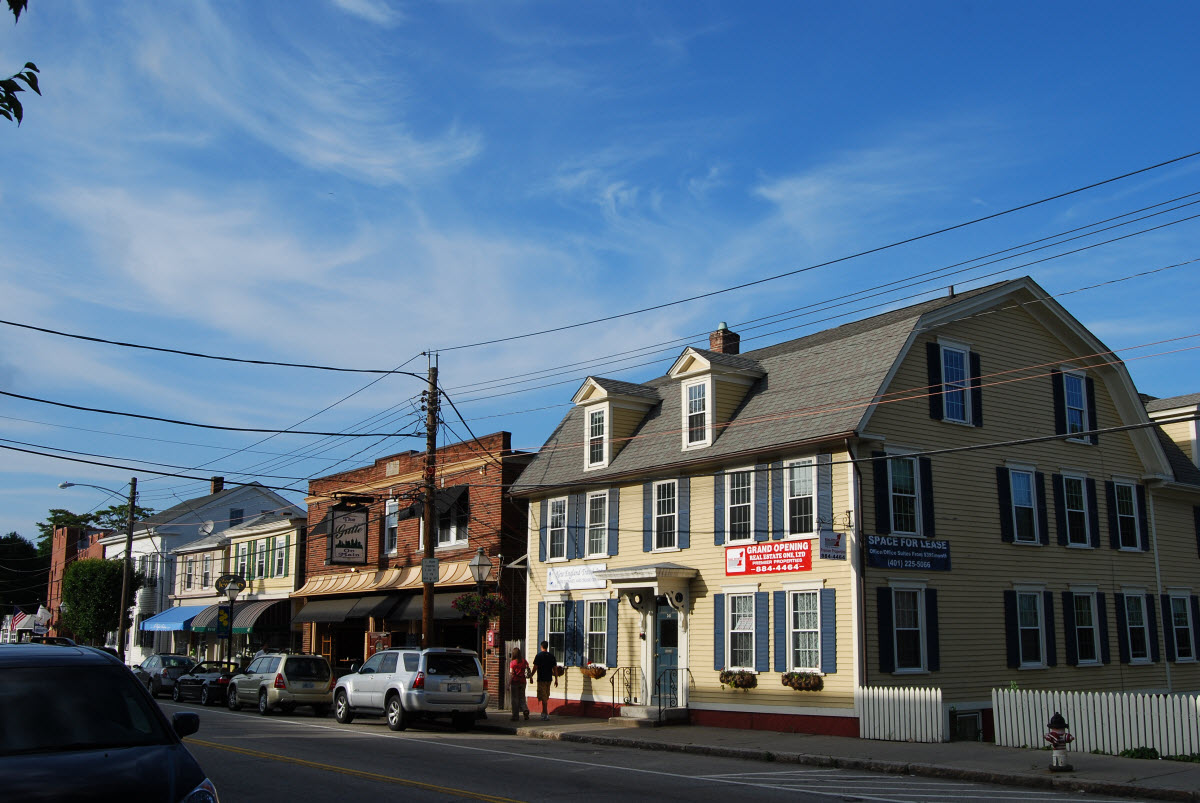
- Downtown East Greenwich

- Location within Rhode Island Location within the United States
- Location: Warwick and East Greenwich, Rhode Island
- Built: 1677
- Architectural style: Greek Revival, Gothic, Federal
- NRHP reference No.: 74000036
- Added to NRHP: June 13, 1974

East Greenwich Historic District is a historic district encompassing the historic commercial and civic heart of East Greenwich, Rhode Island, United States. The district bounded on the east by Greenwich Cove, an inlet on Narrangansett Bay, on the south by London and Spring Streets (although the village, itself, extends to First Street and Rocky Hollow Road), on the west roughly by Park Street, and on the north by Division Street. The district extends westward on Division Street as far Dark Entry Brook, and the district properties on its north side now lie in the city of Warwick. East Greenwich was settled in 1677 with its town center growing in the district, with a rural farm landscape to the west. The area's road network had begun to take shape by the mid-18th century, and the town center was industrialized in the 19th century.

The district was listed on the National Register of Historic Places in 1974. It includes several separately-listed properties: the Windmill Cottage at 144 Division Street, the Kent County Courthouse, the Gen. James Mitchell Varnum House, the Armory of the Kentish Guards, and the Col. Micah Whitmarsh House.

== See also ==
- National Register of Historic Places listings in Kent County, Rhode Island
- Manor of East Greenwich
