= Tillinghast Road Historic District =

Historic district in Rhode Island, United States

- U.S. National Register of Historic Places
- U.S. Historic district
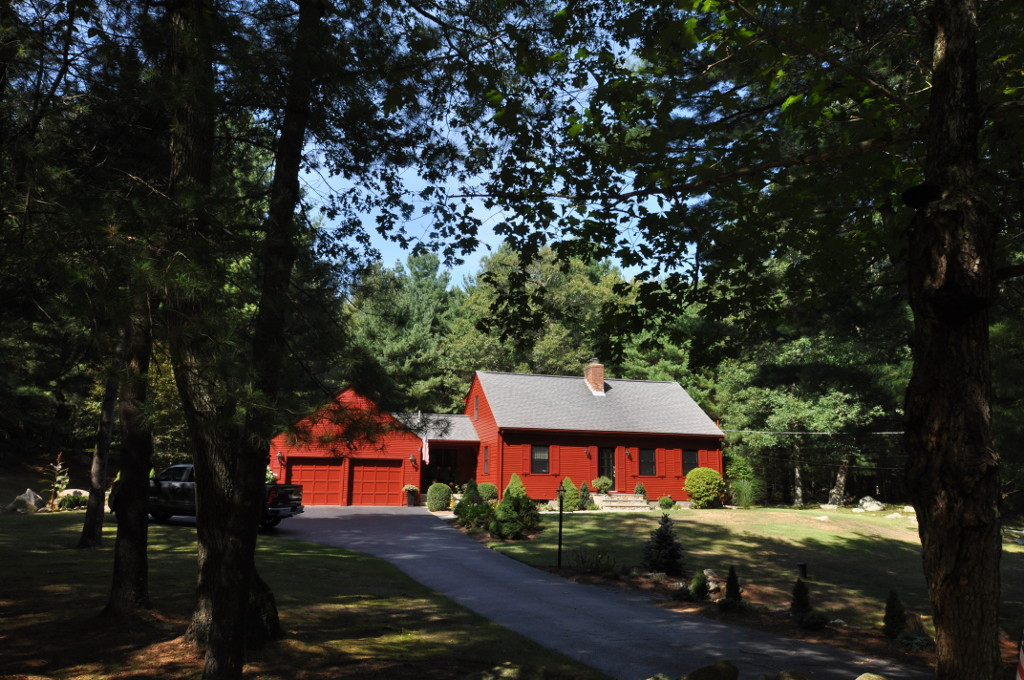

- Location within Rhode Island Location within the United States
- Location: East Greenwich, Rhode Island
- Coordinates: 41.6178°N 71.50983°W
- Area: 160 acres (65 ha)
- Built: 1972
- Architectural style: Greek Revival, Colonial, Federal
- NRHP reference No.: 88000167
- Added to NRHP: March 9, 1988

Tillinghast Road Historic District is a historic district encompassing a rural landscape in East Greenwich, Rhode Island. Extending along Tillinghast Road, a winding two-lane road, southward from its junction with Frenchtown Road, it includes seven farm complexes dating back to the late 18th and early 19th centuries. One of them, the Thomas Tillinghast Farm, located at the above-named junction, is the site of the New England Wireless and Steam Museum, some of whose buildings contribute to the district's significance.

The district was listed on the National Register of Historic Places in 1988.

== See also ==
- National Register of Historic Places listings in Kent County, Rhode Island
