= East Greenwich, Rhode Island =

East Greenwich
- Town
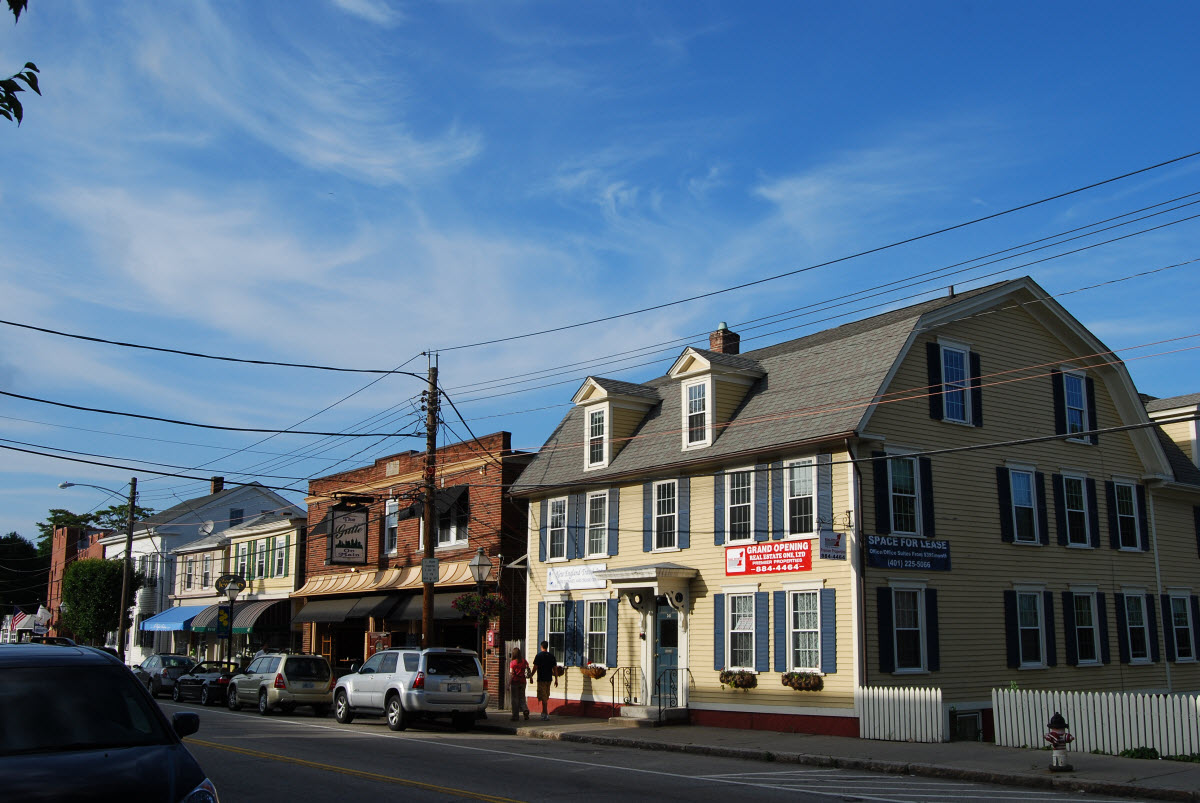
- Historic District in downtown East Greenwich

- Seal Logo

- Location of East Greenwich in Kent County, Rhode Island (top) and of Kent County in Rhode Island (below)
- Coordinates: 41°39′N 71°29′W
- Country: United States
- State: Rhode Island
- County: Kent
- Incorporated: 1677

Government
  - Type: Town Council and Manager
  - Town Council: Mark Schwager, President (D); Mike Donegan, Vice President (D); Caryn Corenthal (D); Renu Englehart (D); Michael Zarrella (D)
  - Manager: Andrew Nota

Area
  - Total: 16.71 sq mi (43.3 km^{2})
  - Land: 16.58 sq mi (42.9 km^{2})
  - Water: 0.14 sq mi (0.36 km^{2})
- Elevation: 207 ft (63 m)

Population (2020)
  - Total: 14,312
  - Density: 863.2/sq mi (333.3/km^{2})
- Time zone: UTC−5 (Eastern (EST))
  - Summer (DST): UTC−4 (EDT)
- ZIP Code: 02818
- Area code: 401
- FIPS code: 44-22240
- GNIS feature ID: 1220085
- Website: https://www.eastgreenwichri.gov/

East Greenwich is a town and the county seat of Kent County, Rhode Island. The population was 14,312 at the 2020 census. East Greenwich is the wealthiest municipality within the state of Rhode Island. It is part of the Providence metropolitan statistical area and the Greater Boston combined statistical area.

Formed as Greenwich in 1677, it was named for Greenwich, England. It was renamed Dedford in 1686 but reverted to its original name in 1689. In 1741 the more rural western three quarters of the town was set off as West Greenwich, the remaining quarter of it thenceforth being called East Greenwich. Until 1854, it was one of the five state capitals for Rhode Island. The General Assembly, when meeting in East Greenwich, used the local courthouse, which is today the town hall. East Greenwich Village is located in the northeastern part of the town and extends north about 0.93 mi (1.5 km) into the city of Warwick, Rhode Island. The town is now known for its waterfront, school district, and downtown restaurant/shopping district.

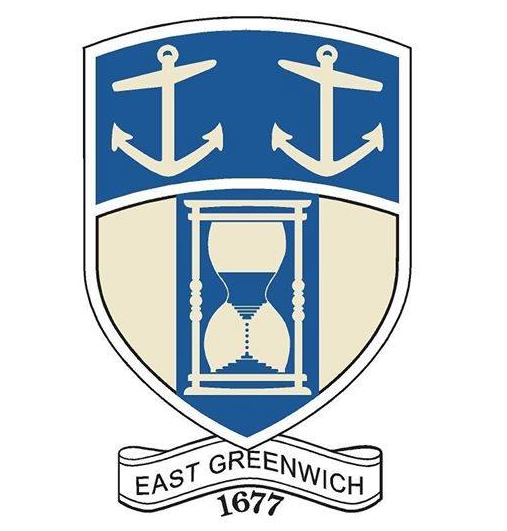
Seal of East Greenwich

== History ==
East Greenwich, the 8th oldest town in Rhode Island, was founded in October 1677 by the General Assembly in an attempt to solidify land claims against those of Connecticut and the Narragansett Proprietors. The Assembly designated 5,000 acres to the new town and provided lots to settlers who would agree to live there—land was deeded to 48 men who had fought in King Phillip's War against the Wampanoag. Locals quickly took the assembly up on this offer, and the quick establishment of the town helped hold back plans of Connecticut in pushing their border eastward. East Greenwich was therefore the only Rhode Island town established by an act of government, not commercial interests. In 1687, the Narragansett Proprietors attempted to settle land north of Wickford which overlapped with the land of East Greenwich; however, the Massachusetts governor Sir Edmund Andros, who had authority to settle the dispute, ruled in favor of the existing East Greenwich settlement.

In the 18th century, the government released previously reserved waterfront property in small lots. Beginning in 1711, the local government granted these lots to any person who would pay one shilling and promise to build a commercial building of a minimum size. By 1725, a community had developed, complete with a schoolhouse and a graveyard. However, citizens of the town complained that attending town meetings was too difficult due to the size of the town, which prompted the splitting of West Greenwich into its own town in 1741. The town erected a courthouse when East Greenwich was designated the shire town of the newly formed Kent County, which had been separated from Providence County in 1750. On June 12, 1772, a resolution was passed by the Rhode Island State Assembly to form the United States' first Navy in East Greenwich, which included two ships, the Katy and the Washington. The Assembly put Captain Abraham Whipple in charge of this new military branch and these ships, with the formal title commodore.

In its colonial days, the town was also home to followers of a former Quaker who, after a severe illness, claimed to have died and been resurrected as the "Public Universal Friend"; these followers financed a meeting house within the town.

=== Scalloptown ===
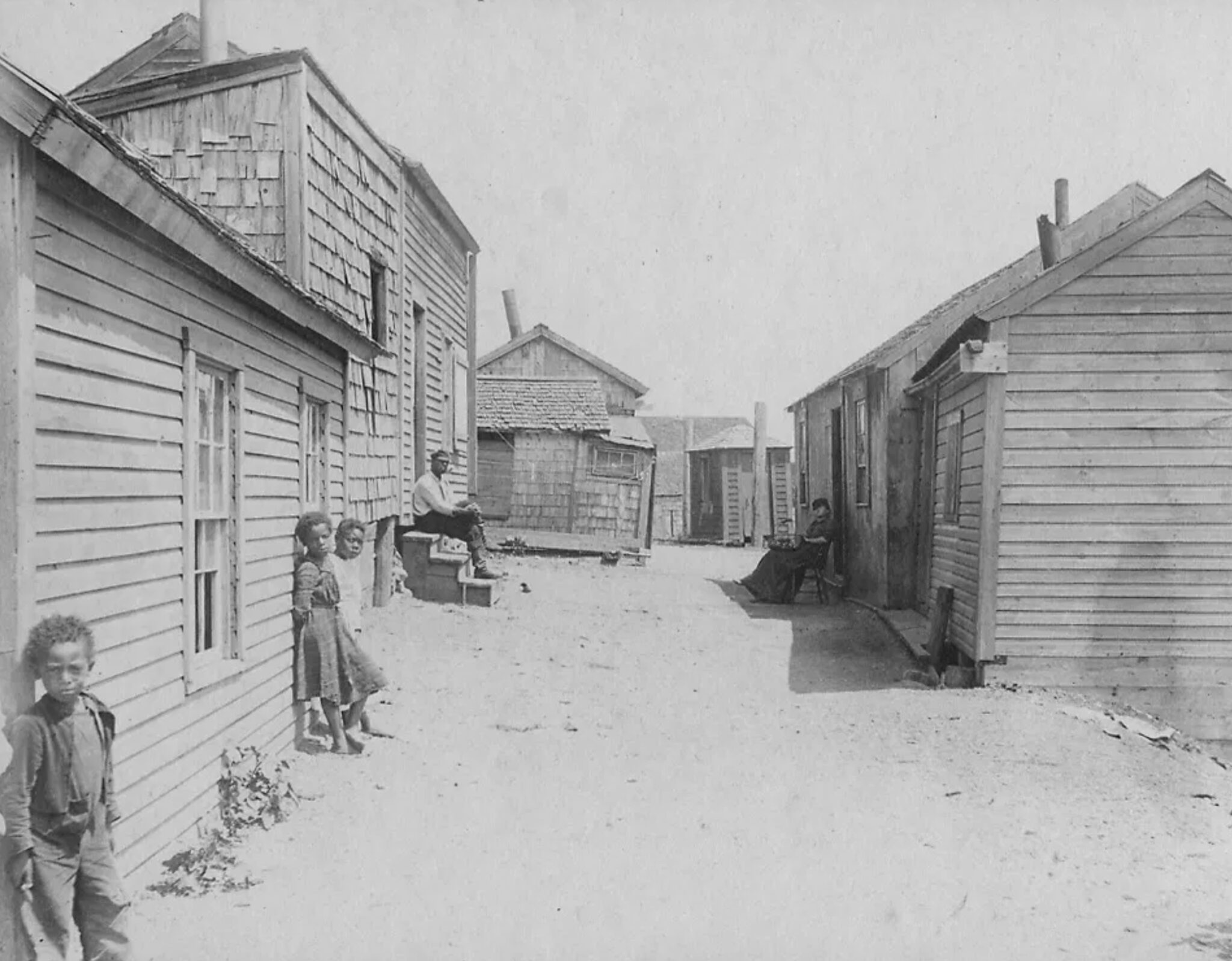
Scalloptown shanties in the early 20th Century

In the 19th Century, East Greenwich attracted a wave of immigrants from Ireland, Italy, Germany, and Scandinavian countries, as well as free Blacks. Many settled in a small community which came to be known as Scalloptown, as many residents made a living from fishing and selling scallops. As it grew, the neighborhood of immigrants and mixed ethnicities developed a reputation as a "shantytown" of "low and lawless nature" by white writers and community leaders. The neighborhood's height was from 1890 to 1913. In 1913, the town council condemned many of the residences of Scalloptown as unfit for habitation. Currently, only one shellfish processing business remains on the street.

Most of East Greenwich's neighborhood of Scalloptown was destroyed by 1926, after a mass eviction order by the town council left most of its buildings vacant. Scalloptown had been the attention of reformers in town for some time. Scalloptown was the site of "Neighborhood House", a settlement house run by Sarah Fernandis from 1908 on. But, historian Catherine Streich argues, the racial prejudices of white East Greenwich residents and their dwindling desire for social reform led to their destruction of Scalloptown.

== Geography ==
East Greenwich is a coastal town, located on the western side of Narragansett Bay. Of its total area of 16.71 square miles, 16.58 square miles is land and 0.14 square miles is water. 20 percent of the land in East Greenwich consists of undeveloped woods and farmland, although development continues to bring this proportion down.

Various roads form approximate borders with some of its neighboring towns. Division Street sits between East Greenwich and Warwick, to the north and west until Route 2. South and east is North Kingstown which is roughly separated from East Greenwich by Frenchtown Road.

=== Climate ===
According to the Köppen climate classification, East Greenwich has either a hot-summer humid continental climate (abbreviated Dfa), or a hot-summer humid sub-tropical climate (abbreviated Cfa), depending on the isotherm used.

Climate data for East Greenwich, 1991–2020 simulated normals (79 ft elevation)
Month	Jan	Feb	Mar	Apr	May	Jun	Jul	Aug	Sep	Oct	Nov	Dec	Year
Mean daily maximum °F (°C)	37.9 (3.3)	39.7 (4.3)	46.4 (8.0)	56.8 (13.8)	67.1 (19.5)	75.9 (24.4)	81.7 (27.6)	80.6 (27.0)	74.1 (23.4)	63.1 (17.3)	52.7 (11.5)	43.2 (6.2)	59.9 (15.5)
Daily mean °F (°C)	29.7 (−1.3)	31.3 (−0.4)	38.1 (3.4)	48.2 (9.0)	58.1 (14.5)	67.3 (19.6)	73.4 (23.0)	72.1 (22.3)	65.3 (18.5)	54.3 (12.4)	44.2 (6.8)	35.4 (1.9)	51.5 (10.8)
Mean daily minimum °F (°C)	21.6 (−5.8)	22.8 (−5.1)	29.8 (−1.2)	39.6 (4.2)	49.1 (9.5)	58.8 (14.9)	64.9 (18.3)	63.7 (17.6)	56.7 (13.7)	45.5 (7.5)	35.8 (2.1)	27.7 (−2.4)	43.0 (6.1)
Average precipitation inches (mm)	4.16 (105.57)	3.52 (89.36)	5.26 (133.65)	4.63 (117.72)	3.44 (87.32)	3.97 (100.77)	3.25 (82.48)	3.79 (96.32)	4.07 (103.46)	4.65 (118.18)	4.29 (108.88)	4.96 (126.06)	49.99 (1,269.77)
Average dew point °F (°C)	19.6 (−6.9)	20.5 (−6.4)	25.7 (−3.5)	34.7 (1.5)	46.6 (8.1)	57.2 (14.0)	63.5 (17.5)	63.0 (17.2)	56.8 (13.8)	45.5 (7.5)	34.5 (1.4)	26.2 (−3.2)	41.2 (5.1)
Source: PRISM Climate Group

== Schools ==
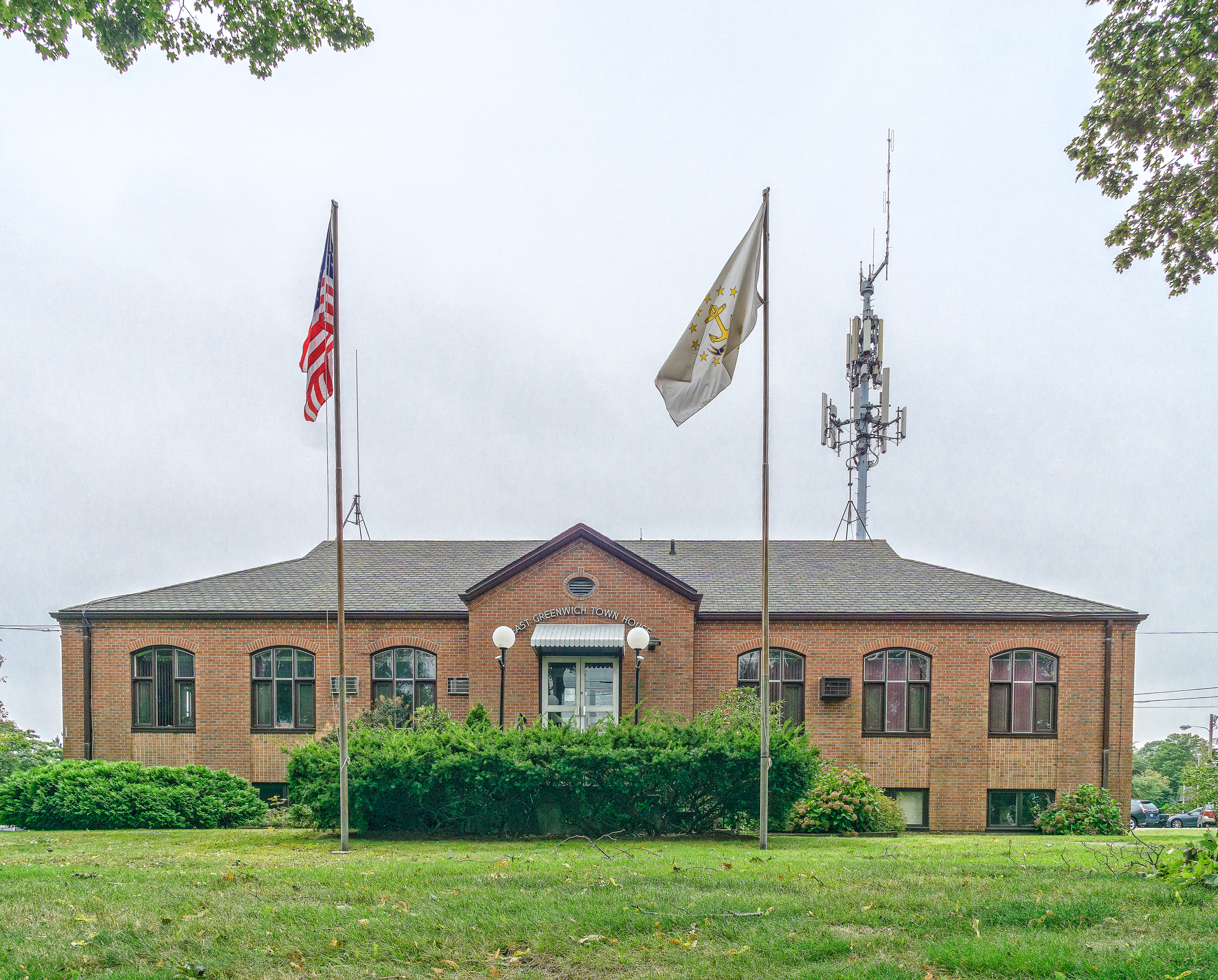
East Greenwich public schools central office at 111 Pierce Street

East Greenwich is home to six public schools in its school district. The district contains two zoning districts for its elementary schools. Students in one district, which primarily consists of households east of South County Trail, attend Meadowbrook Farms Elementary from kindergarten to second grade, then proceed to George R. Hanaford School for third grade to fifth grade. Most students who live west of South County Trail will attend Frenchtown Elementary for kindergarten to second grade before attending James H. Eldredge School for third grade to fifth grade. All students in the public school district then attend Archie R. Cole Middle School for sixth grade to eighth grade. The district's single high school is East Greenwich High School.

In 2015, Newsweek magazine ranked East Greenwich High School first in Rhode Island and 186th in the United States.

The town also contains the Our Lady Of Mercy Regional School a private Catholic school serving students from pre-kindergarten to eighth grade. East Greenwich was also home to the East Greenwich Academy, an eminent preparatory school; however, the school closed in 1943.

East Greenwich is also home to the main campus of the New England Institute of Technology, known informally as New England Tech. The site was purchased by the school in 2007, and opened to students in summer 2011. A major expansion begun in 2014 added dormitories and new instructional space. The campus includes a 265,000 square foot facility dedicated to classrooms, technical labs, medical suites for training simulations, and administrative services.

== Library ==
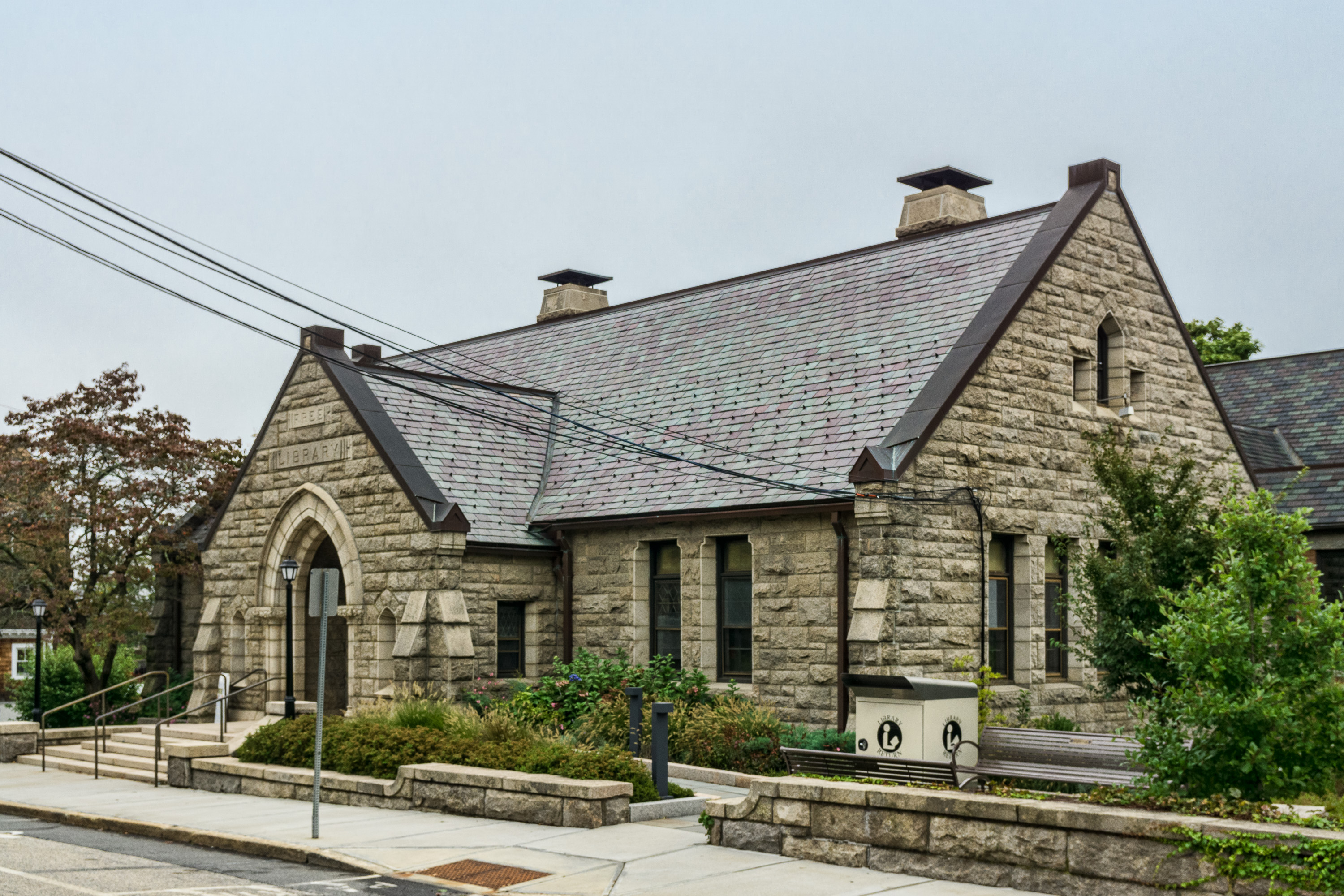
East Greenwich public library

The current East Greenwich Free Library, at 82 Pierce Street, was endowed by Daniel Albert Peirce in 1913. Pierce was a local resident and co-founder of the Narragansett Electric Company. The library building is built of granite from Coventry, Rhode Island, and was dedicated on June 29, 1915. The library includes special collections on Rhode Island history and genealogy.

== Waterfront ==
Many restaurants, bars, and clubs sit on the waterfront. East Greenwich Cove also has ample boat parking. There is also a public dock good for fishing and eating, and a dock with a small beach. Across from the coast is Goddard Memorial State Park, which has many beaches including Sandy Point and has easy access from East Greenwich Cove.

Scalloptown Park has been completed at the southern end of Greenwich Cove, built atop the old town landfill. However, it is not part of historical Scalloptown, which was another name for the waterfront in earlier times. Home to a poor community of squatters in the late nineteenth century to the earliest twentieth century, Scalloptown became a community untethered from the rest of East Greenwich. In contrast to the other villages in East Greenwich, Scalloptown consisted primarily of poor whites and African Americans. The true Scalloptown goes from the town dock down past the clubs to Finn's Marina.

== Demographics ==
Historical population
Year	Pop.	±%
1708	240	—
1730	1,223	+409.6%
1748	1,044	−14.6%
1755	1,167	+11.8%
1774	1,663	+42.5%
1776	1,664	+0.1%
1782	1,609	−3.3%
1790	1,824	+13.4%
1800	1,775	−2.7%
1810	1,530	−13.8%
1820	1,519	−0.7%
1830	1,591	+4.7%
1840	1,509	−5.2%
1850	2,358	+56.3%
1860	2,882	+22.2%
1870	2,660	−7.7%
1880	2,887	+8.5%
1890	3,127	+8.3%
1900	2,775	−11.3%
1910	3,420	+23.2%
1920	3,290	−3.8%
1930	3,666	+11.4%
1940	3,842	+4.8%
1950	4,923	+28.1%
1960	6,100	+23.9%
1970	9,577	+57.0%
1980	10,211	+6.6%
1990	11,865	+16.2%
2000	12,948	+9.1%
2010	13,146	+1.5%
2020	14,312	+8.9%
U.S. Decennial Census

As of the United States Census of 2020, there were 14,312 people and 5,281 households in the town. The population density was 863.2 inhabitants per square mile (333.3/km^{2}). There were 5,539 housing units in the town. The racial makeup of the town was 85.77% White, 1.10% African American, 0.08% Native American, 5.79% Asian, 0.03% Pacific Islander, 1.07% from other races, and 6.16% from two or more races. Hispanic or Latino of any race were 4.16% of the population.

There were 5,281 households, out of which 38.5% had children under the age of 18 living with them, 64.6% were married couples living together, 17.3% had a female householder with no spouse present, and 12.5% had a male householder with no spouse present. 11.2% of all households were made up of individuals, and 8.9% had someone living alone who was 65 years of age or older. The average household size was 2.67 and the average family size was 3.16.

In the town, the population was spread out, with 26.7% under the age of 18, 5.3% from 18 to 24, 22.3% from 25 to 44, 28.2% from 45 to 64, and 17.5% who were 65 years of age or older. The median age was 42 years.

The median income for a household in the town was $149,577, and the median income for a family was $198,007. The per capita income for the town was $77,660. About 5.0% of the population were below the poverty line, including 2.4% of those under age 18 and 4.9% of those age 65 or over.

In 2012–2016, according to the Rhode Island Department of Labor, the median family income was $142,648, the highest in Rhode Island.

East Greenwich and the adjacent Warwick neighborhoods of Cowesett and Potowomut are served by several media outlets: East Greenwich News (daily) East Greenwich Patch (daily), The East Greenwich Pendulum (weekly), The North East Independent (weekly) and East Greenwich magazine (monthly).

== Government ==
East Greenwich town vote by party in presidential elections
Year	GOP	DEM	Others
2024	37.47% 3,203	59.52% 5,089	3.01% 257
2020	37.32% 3,227	60.34% 5,218	2.34% 202
2016	40.60% 3,122	52.27% 4,019	7.13% 548
2012	49.93% 3,649	48.37% 3,535	1.70% 124
2008	46.95% 3,570	51.50% 3,916	1.55% 118
2004	51.72% 3,690	46.10% 3,289	2.19% 156
2000	46.99% 3,039	45.78% 2,961	7.24% 468
1996	44.59% 2,703	43.10% 2,613	12.31% 746
1992	41.98% 2,838	35.50% 2,400	22.52% 1,522
1988	60.17% 3,637	39.47% 2,386	0.36% 22

In the Rhode Island Senate, East Greenwich is split in terms of representation. Most of the town is in the 35th District, currently represented by Democrat Bridget Valverde, while a tiny sliver of the northwestern quadrant of the town is in the 33rd District, which is currently represented by Democrat Leonidas P. Raptakis. In the Rhode Island House of Representatives, East Greenwich is in the 30th district represented by Democrat Justine Caldwell. At the federal level, all of East Greenwich is included in Rhode Island's 2nd congressional district and is represented by Democrat Seth Magaziner.

In presidential elections, East Greenwich is one of the very few towns in deep blue Rhode Island that has a tendency to lean Republican, although it has not leaned quite as Republican as towns such as Darien, Connecticut or Lynnfield, Massachusetts. Barack Obama managed to carry the town by just over 4.5 points in the Democratic wave year of 2008 and in 2020, Joe Biden won East Greenwich by just over 23 points, marking the best performance for a Democratic presidential nominee in the town in over three decades. Biden also became the first major party candidate to win over sixty percent of the vote in the town since also then vice president George H. W. Bush.

== National Historic Places ==
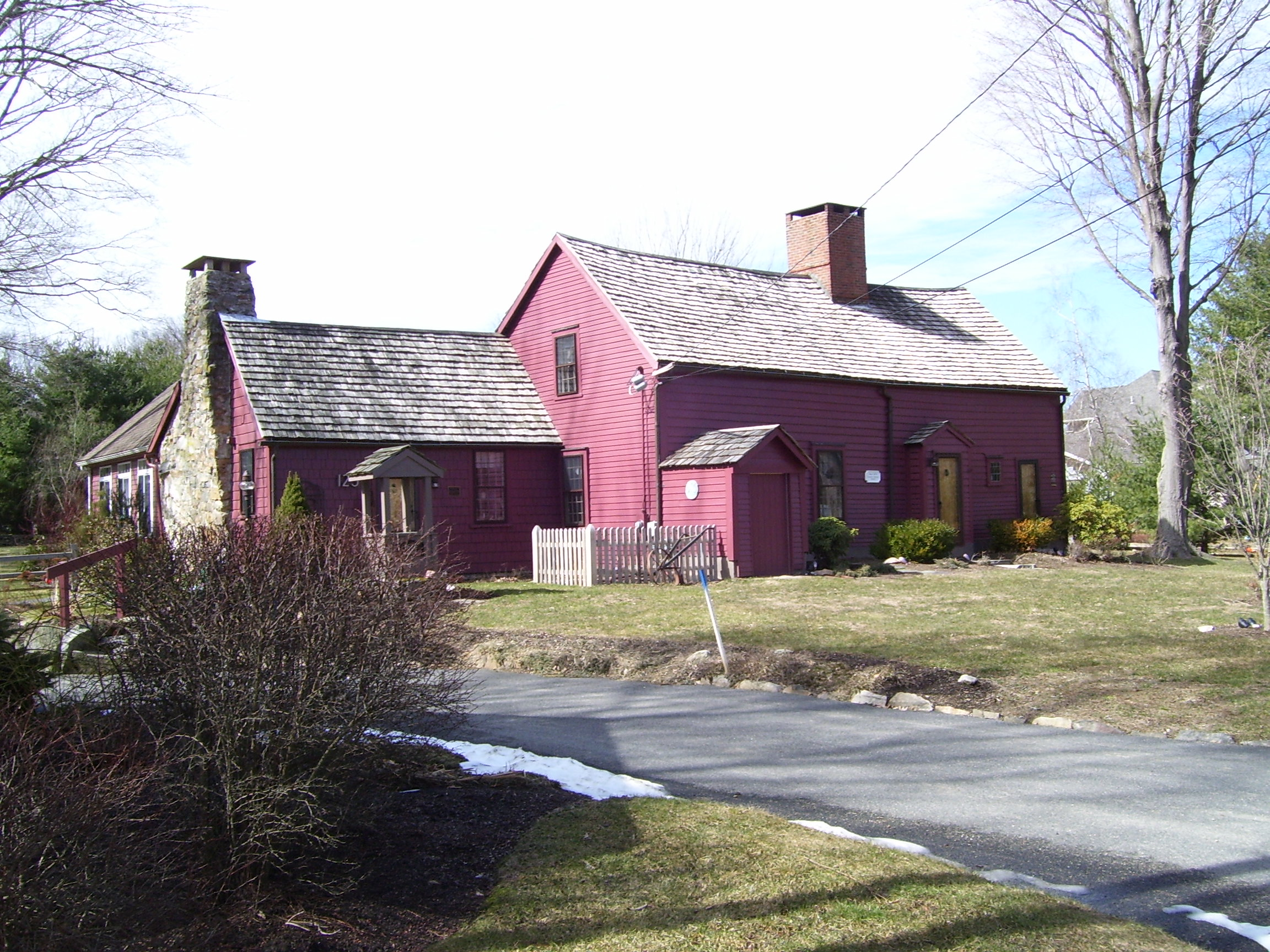
Clement Weaver House, a historic stone ender built in 1679, is one of the oldest homes in Rhode Island.

- Armory of the Kentish Guards
- Clement Weaver-Daniel Howland House
- Col. Micah Whitmarsh House
- East Greenwich Historic District
- Fry's Hamlet Historic District
- Gen. James Mitchell Varnum House
- Kent County Courthouse
- Massie Wireless Station
- Richard Briggs Farm
- Tillinghast Mill Site
- Tillinghast Road Historic District
- Windmill Cottage

== See also ==
- People from East Greenwich, Rhode Island
- New England Wireless and Steam Museum
- Hunt River
- List of newspapers in Rhode Island
- Rhode Island locations by per capita income
- Manor of East Greenwich
