= Berwind =

Berwind may refer to:

Companies

- Berwind Corporation, an American corporation historically involved in the coal industry

Law

- Berwind-White Coal Mining Co. v. Chicago & Erie R. Co., a 1914 United States Supreme Court case

People

- Charles Frederick Berwind (1846-1890), American businessman
- Edward Julius Berwind (1848–1936), American businessman, founder of the Berwind-White Coal Mining Company
- Julia Berwind (1865–1961), American socialite and social welfare activist
- Berwind P. Kaufmann (1897–1975), an American biologist

Places

- Berwind, Colorado, a ghost town in Las Animas County, Colorado, in the United States
- Berwind, West Virginia, a community in McDowell County, West Virginia, in the United States
- Edward J. Berwind House, a mansion in New York City in the United States
- Berwind Lake Wildlife Management Area, a wildlife management area in McDowell County, West Virginia, in the United States

Ships

- SS Berwind, a commercial cargo ship sunk in 1918; see USS Berwind
- USS Berwind (SP-1671), a United States Navy patrol boat briefly in service during 1917
