= Windber Area School District =

School district in Pennsylvania

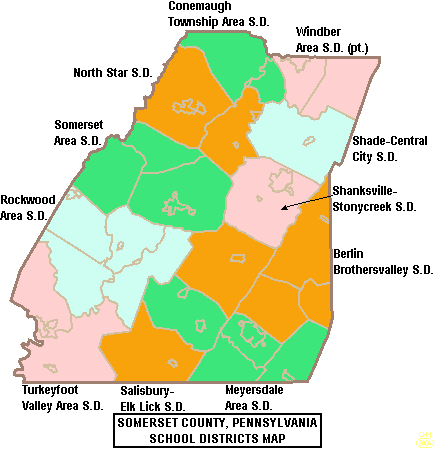

Address
- 2301 Graham Avenue Windber, Somerset and Cambria Counties, Pennsylvania, 15963-1964; United States

District information
- Type: Public
- Established: 1914 (High School)

Students and staff
- District mascot: Ramblers
- Colors: Blue and White

Other information
- Website: https://www.windberschools.org/

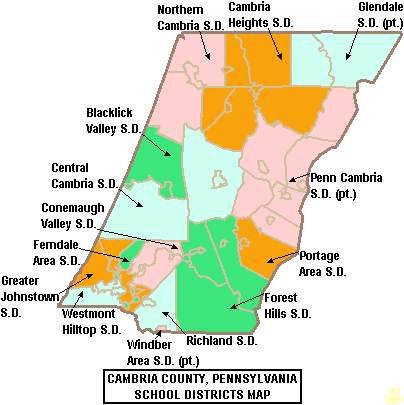
Windber Area School District region in Cambria County

The Windber Area School District is a small, rural, public school district in Somerset County, Pennsylvania and Cambria County, Pennsylvania. It is centered in the borough of Windber, and also serves Paint Boro, Paint Township, and Ogle Township in Somerset County, plus Scalp Level Boro in Cambria County. Windber Area School District covers 69 square miles (180 km^{2}). According to 2000 federal census data, it serves a resident population of 9,640.

== Schools ==
- Windber Area Elementary School – Grades Pre-K to 5
  - 421 Sugar Maple Drive, Windber, Pennsylvania 15963
- Windber Area Middle School – Grades 6 to 8
  - 2301 Graham Avenue, Windber, Pennsylvania 15963
- Windber Area High School – Grades 9 to 12
  - 2401 Graham Avenue, Windber, Pennsylvania 15963

== Extracurriculars ==
The district offers a variety of clubs, activities and sports.

=== Sports ===
The District funds:

Boys

- Baseball - AA
- Basketball- AA
- Cross Country - A
- Football - A
- Soccer - A
- Tennis - AA
- Track and Field - AA

Girls

- Basketball - AA
- Cross Country - A
- Soccer (Fall) - A
- Softball - AA
- Girls' Tennis - AA
- Track and Field - AA
- Volleyball - A

Junior High School Sports

Boys

- Basketball
- Football
- Soccer
- Track and field

Girls

- Basketball
- Soccer
- Track and field
- Volleyball

- According to PIAA directory July 2012
