= Wilmore Steamship Company =

Former US Shipping Company

- Company type: Privately held
- Industry: Transportation and shipping (coal)
- Founded: 1930 in New York City
- Key people: Charles Frederick Berwind; Edward Julius Berwind; John E. Berwind; Harry A. Berwind; Allison R. White`; John R. Caldwell
- Subsidiaries: Berwind-White Coal Mining Company; Berwind Corporation; Wilmore Coal Company
- Website: https://www.berwind.com/

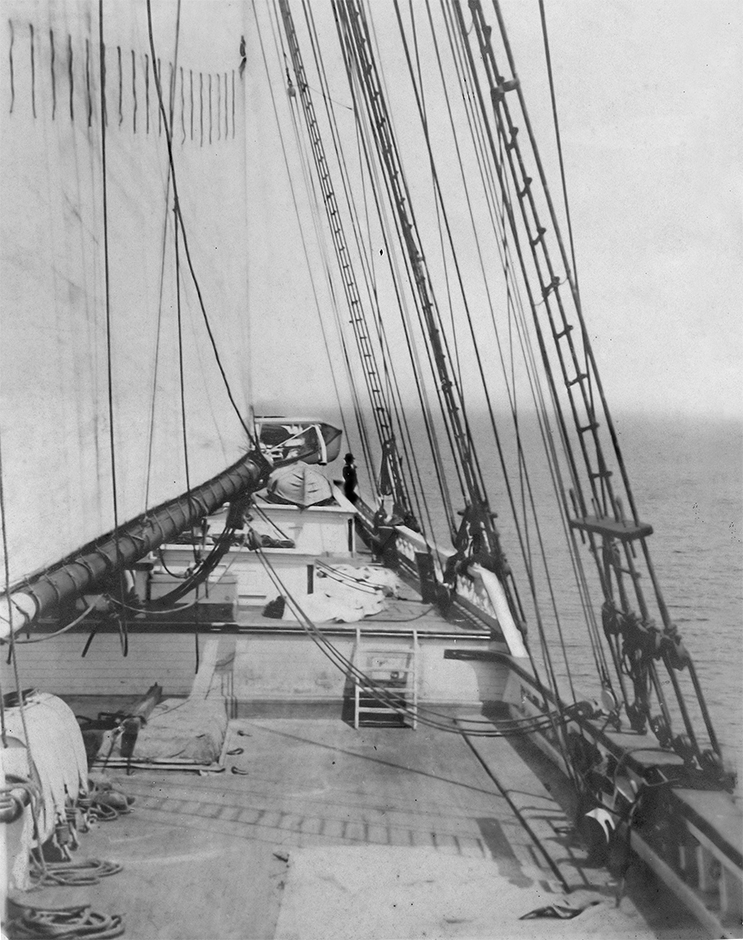
Schooner Edward J. Berwind, in 1902

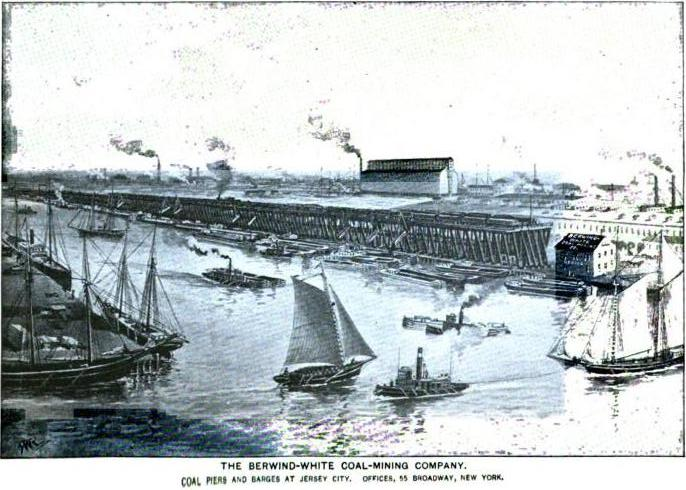
Berwind-White Company coal piers in Jersey City

Wilmore Steamship Company was a steamship shipping company that was founded in New York City in 1930. The Wilmore Steamship Company mainly operated coal ships, called Collier ship. The coal ships main routes were loading coal at Hampton Roads, Virginia, and delivering the coal to New England ports. The first two ships on the route were the SS Berwindglen and SS Berwindvale. Both ships were built by Bethlehem Steel's Bethlehem Shipbuilding Corporation at Quincy, Massachusetts, at the Fore River Shipyard. SS Berwindglen and SS Berwindvale were new 4,411-ton colliers ships, that had first United States engines that used pulverized coal-fired boilers. The steamship SS Mercer, a 9,500 ton merchant ship was the test ship of pulverized coal, modified to evaluated pulverized coal in 1929. The test were good and the SS Berwindglen and SS Berwindvale were built for this new fuel. Wilmore Steamship Company was named after Wilmore Heights, Pennsylvania. Wilmore Steamship Company was active in supporting the World War II effort.

== History ==
Charles Frederick Berwind, Edward Julius Berwind, and John E. Berwind (1854–1928), coal merchants, with Allison White, a surveyor and later Congressman, founded the Berwind, White & Company in Philadelphia in 1876. Berwind, White & Company was a coal and shipping company the specialized in bituminous steam coal from Greenwich, Connecticut port. Berwind, White & Company was incorporated and renamed Berwind-White Coal Mining Company in 1886 in Philadelphia. Their first ship was purchased in 1897, named Edward J. Berwind (as he was president ), she was a 1,141-ton schooner built in Camden, New Jersey. Berwind-White Coal Mining Company Inc. opened a subsidiary company in 1900, the Wilmore Coal Company in Windber, Pennsylvania. Wilmore Coal Company operated a Berwind-White Coal Mining Company's land and coal purchasing and transportation company. They opened a field office in Windber, Pennsylvania that John R. Caldwell ran. In 1905 Berwind-White Coal Mining Company purchased Shoemaker Coal Mining Company in Wilmore Heights from Theophilus S. Shoemaker and J. L. Shoemaker. Shoemaker Coal Mining Company operated a coal mine, the Wilmore No. 1 bituminous coal mine located one mile southwest of Bens Creek on the Pennsylvania Railroad. With the two new ships 1930 SS Berwindglen and SS Berwindvale, the Berwind's incorporated Wilmore Steamship Company in 1930. After the war the SS Berwindvale was sold to the American Gulf Steamship Corporation in 1946. American Gulf Steamship Corporation renamed the Berwindvale to James Sheridan. Wilmore Steamship Company purchased a replacement ship a 6,643-ton coal ship also named Berwindvale built in New Orleans. As fuel oil replaced coal in the 1950s, the Wilmore Steamship Company ships were sold. The company's vast coal reserves were leased out. Berwind Corporation founded in 1962, is an investment management company that continues today.

The Berwind brother's father was John Berwind (1813–1893), he came to New York city in 1837 from Bavaria.

== World War II ==
Wilmore Steamship Company fleet of ships that were used to help the World War II effort. During World War II Wilmore Steamship Company operated Merchant navy ships for the United States Shipping Board. During World War II Wilmore Steamship Company was active with charter shipping with the Maritime Commission and War Shipping Administration. Wilmore Steamship Company operated Liberty ships for the merchant navy. The ship was run by its Wilmore Steamship Company crew and the US Navy supplied United States Navy Armed Guards to man the deck guns and radio.

== Ships ==
Ships owned:

- Schooner Edward J. Berwind, built in 1894, in 1908, abandoned by the crew during a hurricane and later destroyed to prevent it from becoming a navigation hazard.
- Berwindglen built in 1929, 4,411 tons, 350 feet long, in 1950 became the Mary J. Sheridan, was scrapped 1954
- Berwindvale 1929 built in 1929, 4,411 tons, 350 feet long, in 1946 became the James Sheridan, was scrapped 1952
- Berwindvale 1945 was Redstone Seam, acquired in 1946. Sold in 1951 to Staples Coal Company of Boston, sold and renamed point Vincente in 1963, was scrapped in 1965 Castellon, Spain.

Liberty ship of World War II

  - World War II:
  - Liberty Ships:
- David B. Johnson
- David Lubin
- Redstone Seam
- Melville Jacoby
- Lucius Fairchild
- Henry W. Grady
- Edward P. Alexander

== See also ==
- World War II United States Merchant Navy
