= WAHS (disambiguation) =

WAHS is a radio station licensed to Auburn Hills, Michigan, United States.

WAHS may refer to:

== Schools ==
- Warren Area High School, Warren, Pennsylvania, United States
- West Albany High School, Albany, Oregon, United States
- West Anchorage High School, Anchorage, Alaska, United States
- West Aurora High School, Aurora, Illinois, United States
- Western Alamance High School, Elon, North Carolina, United States
- Western Albemarle High School, Crozet, Virginia, United States
- William Allen High School, Allentown, Pennsylvania, United States
- Windber Area High School, Windber, Pennsylvania, United States
- Würzburg American High School, a closed United States Department of Defense Dependent School System school in Würzburg, Germany
- Wyomissing Area Junior/Senior High School, Wyomissing, Pennsylvania, United States

== Other ==
- Jenderal Ahmad Yani International Airport (ICAO: WAHS)
- New Zealand Warriors, A New Zealand Rugby League team nicknamed "The Wahs"
