= Windber Historic District =

Historic district in Pennsylvania, United States

- U.S. National Register of Historic Places
- U.S. Historic district
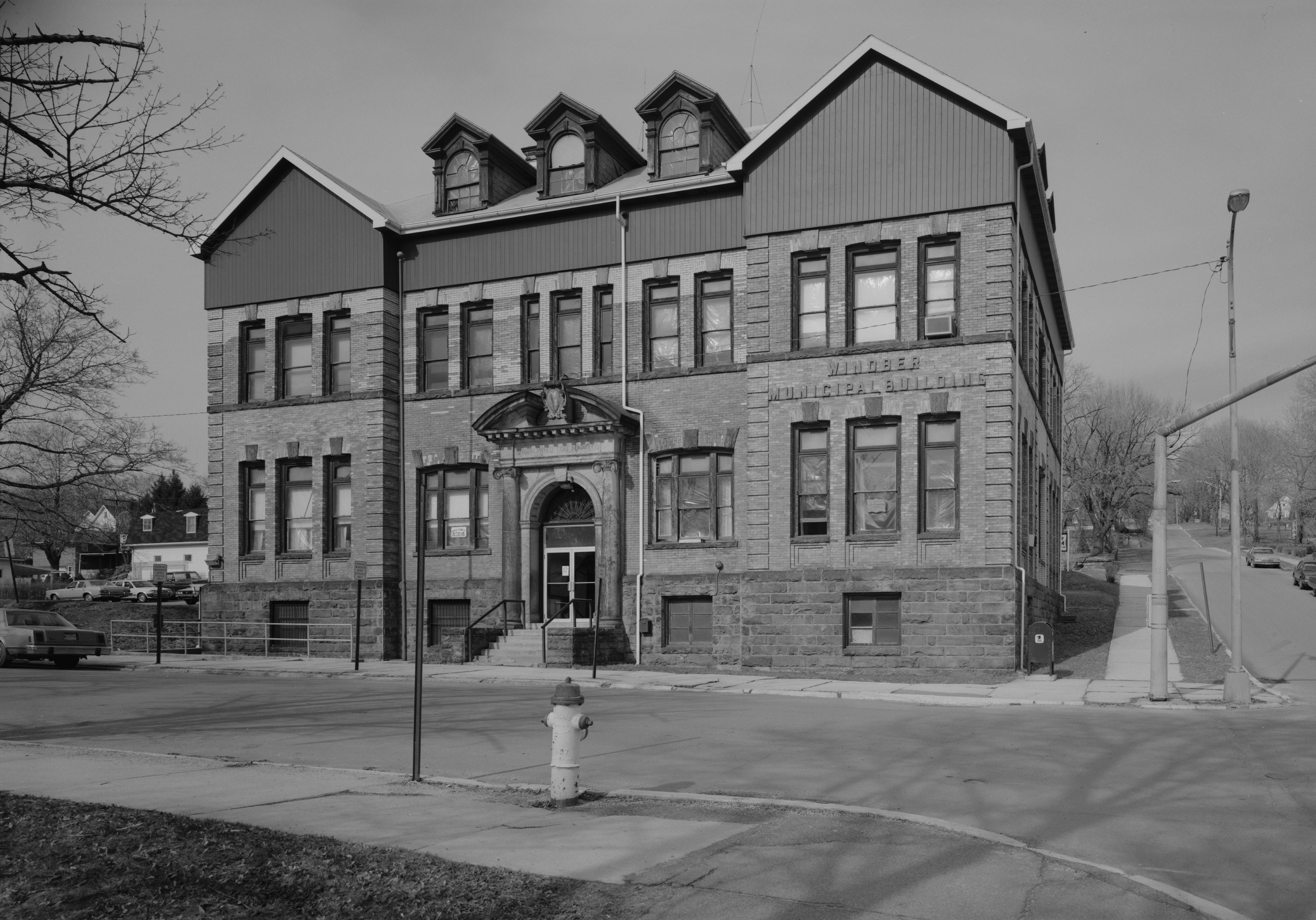
- Borough building in Windber, HABS photo, 1988

- Location within Pennsylvania Location within the United States
- Location: Roughly bounded by the borough line, Cambria Ave., 28th St. and the Big Paint Cr., Paint Borough, Scalp Level and Windber, Pennsylvania
- Coordinates: 40°14′10″N 78°49′55″W
- Area: 299 acres (121 ha)
- Built: 1897
- Architect: Berwind-White Coal Mining Co.
- Architectural style: Colonial Revival, Queen Anne, Vernacular worker housing
- NRHP reference No.: 91001705
- Added to NRHP: November 14, 1991

Windber Historic District is a national historic district located at Paint Borough, Scalp Level, and Windber in Cambria County and Somerset County, Pennsylvania, United States. The district includes 944 contributing buildings and 1 contributing site. It encompasses an area first developed by the Berwind-White Coal Company in 1897, and developed and between 1897 and 1930. It includes the central business district of Windber and surrounding residential areas, consisting largely of workers' housing. Notable buildings include the Berwind-White Headquarters Building (1903), Eureka Department Store (1899), Windber Trust Company (1910), Windber Electric Building (1925), Clement Building (1902), Windber Hotel (1902), former train station (1916), Arcadia Theater (1919), Clubhouse (1899), David Shaffer House (now Windber Museum, 1886), and Windber Hospital (c. 1905).

It was listed on the National Register of Historic Places in 1991.
