= SS David B. Johnson =

World War II Liberty ship of the United States

History

United States
- Name: David B. Johnson
- Namesake: David B. Johnson
- Ordered: as type (EC2-S-C1) hull, MC hull 1511
- Builder: J.A. Jones Construction, Brunswick, Georgia
- Cost: $1,347,352
- Yard number: 127
- Way number: 5
- Laid down: 23 November 1943
- Launched: 13 January 1944
- Sponsored by: Mai Rutledge Johnson
- Completed: 24 January 1944
- Identification: Call Signal: KVMB
- Fate: Laid up in National Defense Reserve Fleet, Beaumont, Texas, 18 November 1948; Laid up in National Defense Reserve Fleet, Suisun Bay, California, 2 July 1952; Sold scrapping, 2 January 1968

General characteristics
- Class & type: Liberty ship; type EC2-S-C1, standard
- Tonnage: 10,865 LT DWT; 7,176 GRT
- Displacement: 3,380 long tons (3,434 t) (light); 14,245 long tons (14,474 t) (max)
- Length: 441 feet 6 inches (135 m) oa; 416 feet (127 m) pp; 427 feet (130 m) lwl
- Beam: 57 feet (17 m)
- Draft: 27 ft 9.25 in (8.4646 m)
- Installed power: 2 × Oil fired 450 °F (232 °C) boilers, operating at 220 psi (1,500 kPa); 2,500 hp (1,900 kW)
- Propulsion: 1 × triple-expansion steam engine, (manufactured by General Machinery Corp., Hamilton, Ohio); 1 × screw propeller
- Speed: 11.5 knots (21.3 km/h; 13.2 mph)
- Capacity: 562,608 cubic feet (15,931 m^{3}) (grain); 499,573 cubic feet (14,146 m^{3}) (bale)
- Complement: 38–62 USMM; 21–40 USNAG
- Armament: Varied by ship; Bow-mounted 3-inch (76 mm)/50-caliber gun; Stern-mounted 4-inch (102 mm)/50-caliber gun; 2–8 × single 20-millimeter (0.79 in) Oerlikon anti-aircraft (AA) cannons and/or, 2–8 × 37-millimeter (1.46 in) M1 AA guns

SS David B. Johnson was a Liberty ship built in the United States during World War II. She was named after David B. Johnson, the founder and first president of Winthrop University.

== Construction ==
David B. Johnson was laid down on 23 November 1943, under a United States Maritime Commission (MARCOM) contract, MC hull 1511, by J.A. Jones Construction, Brunswick, Georgia; she was sponsored by Mai Rutledge Johnson, widow of David B. Johnson, and was launched on 13 January 1944.

== History ==
She was allocated to the Wilmore Steamship Company, on 24 January 1944. On 18 November 1948, she was laid up in the National Defense Reserve Fleet in Beaumont, Texas. On 2 July 1952, she was laid up in the National Defense Reserve Fleet in Suisun Bay, California. On 2 January 1968, she was sold to the Nicolai Joffe Corp., for $49,576, for scrapping. She was withdrawn from the fleet on 17 January 1968.

== Bibliography ==
- "Jones Construction, Brunswick GA". ShipbuildingHistory.com. 13 October 2010.
- "Liberty Ships – World War II".
- Maritime Administration. "David B. Johnson". Ship History Database Vessel Status Card. U.S. Department of Transportation, Maritime Administration. Archived from the original on 12 December 2019.
- Davies, James (May 2004). "Specifications (As-Built)" (PDF). p. 23.
- "SS David B. Johnson".
