= Windber Area High School =

Coordinates: 40.23044°N 78.82424°W

Location
- 2301 Graham Avenue; Windber, Pennsylvania 15963

Information
- School type: Public High School
- School district: Windber Area School District
- NCES District ID: 4226610
- Superintendent: Michael J. Vuckovich
- NCES School ID: 422661004026
- Principal: Scott McClain
- Faculty: 26.59 (FTE)
- Grades: 9-12
- Enrollment: 355 (2017-18)
- Student to teacher ratio: 13.35
- Colors: Blue and White
- Team name: Ramblers
- Communities served: Paint Boro, Windber
- Feeder schools: Windber Area Middle School

Windber Area High School is a public High School on the Somerset-Cambria County Border, serving students from the Somerset County boroughs of Windber and Paint, also Scalp Level Borough in Cambria County. It also serves students in Paint and Ogle Townships in Somerset County. WAHS's feeder school, Windber Area Middle School is connected directly to the high school.

== Athletics ==
Windber participates in the Inter-County Conference and PIAA District V

- Baseball – Class AA
- Basketball – Class AA
- Cross Country – Class A
- Football – Class A
- Soccer – Class A
- Tennis – Class AA
- Track and Field – Class AA
- Volleyball – Class A

== Activities ==
- Concert Choir
- Concert Band
- Concert Orchestra
- Competitive Marching Band
- Drama Club
- Spring Musical
- Technology Student Association
- Indoor Guard
- Indoor Majorettes
- Forensics
- Stage Crew
- World Languages Club
- History Club
- Ski Club
- Video Club
- Mock Trial
- Student Council
- National Honors Society
- Class Council
- SADD Club
- TATU Club
- FCA
- Windber News Team
- VEX Robotics
- Archery Club
