= List of United States Supreme Court cases, volume 235 =

Supreme Court of the United States
- Interactive map of Supreme Court of the United States
- 38°53′26″N 77°00′16″W
- Established: March 4, 1789; 236 years ago
- Location: Washington, D.C.
- Coordinates: 38°53′26″N 77°00′16″W
- Composition method: Presidential nomination with Senate confirmation
- Authorised by: Constitution of the United States, Art. III, § 1
- Judge term length: life tenure, subject to impeachment and removal
- Number of positions: 9 (by statute)
- Website: supremecourt.gov

This is a list of cases reported in volume 235 of United States Reports, decided by the Supreme Court of the United States in 1914 and 1915.

== Justices of the Supreme Court at the time of volume 235 U.S. ==
The Supreme Court is established by Article III, Section 1 of the Constitution of the United States, which says: "The judicial Power of the United States, shall be vested in one supreme Court . . .". The size of the Court is not specified; the Constitution leaves it to Congress to set the number of justices. Under the Judiciary Act of 1789 Congress originally fixed the number of justices at six (one chief justice and five associate justices). Since 1789 Congress has varied the size of the Court from six to seven, nine, ten, and back to nine justices (always including one chief justice).

When the cases in volume 235 were decided the Court comprised the following nine members:

| Portrait | Justice | Office | Home State | Succeeded | Date confirmed by the Senate (Vote) | Tenure on Supreme Court |
|---|---|---|---|---|---|---|
| | Edward Douglass White | Chief Justice | Louisiana | Melville Fuller | December 12, 1910 (Acclamation) | December 19, 1910 – May 19, 1921 (Died) |
| | Joseph McKenna | Associate Justice | California | Stephen Johnson Field | January 21, 1898 (Acclamation) | January 26, 1898 – January 5, 1925 (Retired) |
| | Oliver Wendell Holmes Jr. | Associate Justice | Massachusetts | Horace Gray | December 4, 1902 (Acclamation) | December 8, 1902 – January 12, 1932 (Retired) |
| | William R. Day | Associate Justice | Ohio | George Shiras Jr. | February 23, 1903 (Acclamation) | March 2, 1903 – November 13, 1922 (Retired) |
| | Charles Evans Hughes | Associate Justice | New York | David Josiah Brewer | May 2, 1910 (Acclamation) | October 10, 1910 – June 10, 1916 (Resigned) |
| | Willis Van Devanter | Associate Justice | Wyoming | Edward Douglass White (as Associate Justice) | December 15, 1910 (Acclamation) | January 3, 1911 – June 2, 1937 (Retired) |
| | Joseph Rucker Lamar | Associate Justice | Georgia | William Henry Moody | December 15, 1910 (Acclamation) | January 3, 1911 – January 2, 1916 (Died) |
| | Mahlon Pitney | Associate Justice | New Jersey | John Marshall Harlan | March 13, 1912 (50–26) | March 18, 1912 – December 31, 1922 (Resigned) |
| | James Clark McReynolds | Associate Justice | Tennessee | Horace Harmon Lurton | August 29, 1914 (44–6) | October 12, 1914 – January 31, 1941 (Retired) |

== Citation style ==
Under the Judiciary Act of 1789 the federal court structure at the time comprised District Courts, which had general trial jurisdiction; Circuit Courts, which had mixed trial and appellate (from the US District Courts) jurisdiction; and the United States Supreme Court, which had appellate jurisdiction over the federal District and Circuit courts—and for certain issues over state courts. The Supreme Court also had limited original jurisdiction (i.e., in which cases could be filed directly with the Supreme Court without first having been heard by a lower federal or state court). There were one or more federal District Courts and/or Circuit Courts in each state, territory, or other geographical region.

The Judiciary Act of 1891 created the United States Courts of Appeals and reassigned the jurisdiction of most routine appeals from the district and circuit courts to these appellate courts. The Act created nine new courts that were originally known as the "United States Circuit Courts of Appeals." The new courts had jurisdiction over most appeals of lower court decisions. The Supreme Court could review either legal issues that a court of appeals certified or decisions of court of appeals by writ of certiorari. On January 1, 1912, the effective date of the Judicial Code of 1911, the old Circuit Courts were abolished, with their remaining trial court jurisdiction transferred to the U.S. District Courts.

Bluebook citation style is used for case names, citations, and jurisdictions.

- "# Cir." = United States Court of Appeals
  - e.g., "3d Cir." = United States Court of Appeals for the Third Circuit
- "D." = United States District Court for the District of . . .
  - e.g.,"D. Mass." = United States District Court for the District of Massachusetts
- "E." = Eastern; "M." = Middle; "N." = Northern; "S." = Southern; "W." = Western
  - e.g.,"M.D. Ala." = United States District Court for the Middle District of Alabama
- "Ct. Cl." = United States Court of Claims
- The abbreviation of a state's name alone indicates the highest appellate court in that state's judiciary at the time.
  - e.g.,"Pa." = Supreme Court of Pennsylvania
  - e.g.,"Me." = Supreme Judicial Court of Maine

== List of cases in volume 235 U.S. ==
| Case Name | Page & year | Opinion of the Court | Concurring opinion(s) | Dissenting opinion(s) | Lower Court | Disposition of case |
|---|---|---|---|---|---|---|
| North Carolina v. Tennessee | 1 (1914) | McKenna | none | none | original | boundary set |
| Lane v. Watts | 17 (1914) | McKenna | none | none | D.C. Cir. | rehearing denied |
| Pullman Co. v. Knott | 23 (1914) | Holmes | none | none | N.D. Fla. | affirmed |
| United States v. Portale | 27 (1914) | Holmes | none | none | D. Colo. | reversed |
| Overton v. Oklahoma | 31 (1914) | White | none | none | Okla. | dismissed |
| DeJonge & Co. v. Breuker & K. Co. | 33 (1914) | Holmes | none | none | 3d Cir. | affirmed |
| Missouri et al. R.R. Co. v. United States | 37 (1914) | Holmes | none | none | Ct. Cl. | affirmed |
| Taylor v. Parker | 42 (1914) | Holmes | none | none | Okla. | affirmed |
| Willoughby v. City of Chicago | 45 (1914) | Holmes | none | none | Ill. | dismissed |
| Cleveland & P.R.R. Co. v. City of Cleveland | 50 (1914) | Day | none | none | Ohio | dismissed |
| United States v. Mayer | 55 (1914) | Hughes | none | none | 2d Cir. | certification |
| United States v. Bartlett | 72 (1914) | VanDevanter | none | none | 8th Cir. | affirmed |
| Monagas v. Albertucci | 81 (1914) | White | none | none | P.R. | affirmed |
| L.E. Waterman Co. v. Modern Pen Co. | 88 (1914) | Holmes | Pitney (part) | Pitney (part) | 2d Cir. | affirmed |
| Sage v. Hampe | 99 (1914) | Holmes | none | none | Kan. | reversed |
| Magruder v. Drury | 106 (1914) | Day | none | none | D.C. Cir. | reversed |
| Missouri P.R.R. Co. v. City of Omaha | 121 (1914) | Day | none | none | 8th Cir. | affirmed |
| United States v. Reynolds | 133 (1914) | Day | Holmes | none | S.D. Ala. | reversed |
| McCabe v. Atchison et al. R.R. Co. | 151 (1914) | Hughes | none | none | 8th Cir. | affirmed |
| Louisiana et al. Co. v. Behrman | 164 (1914) | Hughes | none | none | La. | affirmed |
| New York E.L. Co. v. Empire City Subway Co. | 179 (1914) | Hughes | none | none | N.Y. Sup. Ct. | affirmed |
| Sioux Remedy Co. v. Cope | 197 (1914) | VanDevanter | none | none | S.D. Cir. Ct. | reversed |
| Skelton v. Dill | 206 (1914) | VanDevanter | none | none | Okla. | reversed |
| Minidoka & S.R.R. Co. v. United States | 211 (1914) | Lamar | none | none | 9th Cir. | reversed |
| Henry v. Henkel | 219 (1914) | Lamar | none | none | S.D.N.Y. | affirmed |
| United States v. Nixon | 231 (1914) | Lamar | none | none | W.D. Mo. | reversed |
| United States v. Salen | 237 (1914) | Lamar | none | none | S.D.N.Y. | affirmed |
| Porto Rico (sic) v. Emmanuel | 251 (1914) | Pitney | none | none | D.P.R. | reversed |
| Western L.I. Co. v. Rupp | 261 (1914) | Pitney | none | none | Ky. | affirmed |
| United States v. Wigger | 276 (1914) | Pitney | none | none | D. Alaska | reversed |
| United States v. Lewis | 282 (1914) | Pitney | none | none | D. Kan. | reversed |
| Hopkins v. Hebard | 287 (1914) | McReynolds | none | none | 6th Cir. | affirmed |
| Choctaw et al. R.R. Co. v. Harrison | 292 (1914) | McReynolds | none | none | E.D. Okla. | reversed |
| Fallows v. Continental et al. Bank | 300 (1914) | McReynolds | none | none | 7th Cir. | affirmed |
| Garrett v. Louisville & N.R.R. Co. | 308 (1914) | McReynolds | none | none | 6th Cir. | affirmed |
| United States v. Louisville & N.R.R. Co. | 314 (1914) | White | none | none | Comm. Ct. | reversed |
| United States ex rel. Bryant Co. v. New York S.F. Co. | 327 (1914) | McKenna | none | none | S.D.N.Y. | reversed |
| John II Estate, Ltd. v. Brown | 342 (1914) | Holmes | none | none | 9th Cir. | reversed |
| St. Louis S.R.R. Co. v. Arkansas | 350 (1914) | Pitney | none | none | Ark. | affirmed |
| Berwind et al. Co. v. Chicago & E.R.R. Co. | 371 (1914) | White | none | none | Ill. App. Ct. | affirmed |
| Yazoo et al. R.R. Co. v. Wright | 376 (1914) | White | none | none | 6th Cir. | affirmed |
| Easterling L. Co. v. Pierce | 380 (1914) | White | none | none | Miss. | dismissed |
| Lovell M. Mfg. Co. v. Automobile S. Mfg. Co. | 383 (1914) | White | none | none | 2d Cir. | reversed |
| McGovern v. Philadelphia & Reading R.R. Co. | 389 (1914) | McKenna | none | none | E.D. Pa. | reversed |
| Detroit & M.R.R. Co. v. Michigan R.R. Comm'n | 402 (1914) | Holmes | none | none | E.D. Mich. | affirmed |
| Scotten v. Littlefield | 407 (1914) | Day | none | none | 2d Cir. | affirmed |
| Shapiro v. United States | 412 (1914) | Hughes | none | none | N.D. Ill. | dismissed |
| Adkins v. Arnold | 417 (1914) | VanDevanter | none | none | Okla. | affirmed |
| Washington v. Miller | 422 (1914) | VanDevanter | none | none | Okla. | affirmed |
| Texas & P.R.R. Co. v. Rosborough | 429 (1914) | McReynolds | none | none | 5th Cir. | affirmed |
| Drew v. Thaw | 432 (1914) | Holmes | none | none | D.N.H. | reversed |
| Sizemore v. Brady | 441 (1914) | VanDevanter | none | none | Okla. | affirmed |
| Maryland S. Co. v. United States | 451 (1915) | McKenna | none | none | Ct. Cl. | reversed |
| Lankford v. Platte I.W. Co. | 461 (1915) | McKenna | none | Pitney | W.D. Okla. | reversed |
| American W.S. Co. v. Lankford | 496 (1915) | McKenna | none | Pitney | E.D. Okla. | affirmed |
| Farish v. State Banking Bd. | 498 (1915) | McKenna | none | Pitney | E.D. Okla. | affirmed |
| United States v. Erie R.R. Co. | 513 (1915) | McKenna | none | none | S.D.N.Y. | affirmed |
| Lawlor v. Loewe | 522 (1915) | Holmes | none | none | 2d Cir. | affirmed |
| South Covington et al. R.R. Co. v. City of Covington | 537 (1915) | Day | none | none | Ky. | reversed |
| New York ex rel. Cornell S.S. Co. v. Sohmer | 549 (1915) | Day | none | none | N.Y. Sup. Ct. | affirmed |
| Gilbert v. David | 561 (1915) | Day | none | none | D. Conn. | affirmed |
| Jeffrey Mfg. Co. v. Blagg | 571 (1915) | Day | none | none | Ohio | affirmed |
| Mercelis v. Wilson | 579 (1915) | Lamar | none | none | D.P.R. | affirmed |
| Hull v. Dicks | 584 (1915) | Lamar | none | none | 5th Cir. | certification |
| Brown v. Fletcher | 589 (1915) | Lamar | none | none | S.D.N.Y. | reversed |
| Louisville & N.R.R. Co. v. Finn | 601 (1915) | Pitney | none | none | E.D. Ky. | affirmed |
| Hendrick v. Maryland | 610 (1915) | McReynolds | none | none | Md. Cir. Ct. | affirmed |
| Norfolk & W.R.R. Co. v. Holbrook | 625 (1915) | McReynolds | none | McKenna | 4th Cir. | reversed |
| Wathen v. Jackson O. & R. Co. | 635 (1915) | Hughes | none | none | S.D. Miss. | affirmed |
| Dowagiac Mfg. Co. v. Minnesota M.P. Co. | 641 (1915) | VanDevanter | none | none | 8th Cir. | reversed |
| Wadley S.R.R. Co. v. Georgia | 651 (1915) | Lamar | none | none | Ga. | affirmed |
| Arizona et al. R.R. Co. v. Clark | 669 (1915) | Pitney | none | Hughes | 9th Cir. | affirmed |
