= Charles Frederick Berwind =

Founder of the Berwind-White Coal Mining Company

President of Berwind-White Coal Mining Company
- In office 1886–1890
- Preceded by: Inaugural holder
- Succeeded by: Edward Julius Berwind

Personal details
- Born: April 1, 1846 Philadelphia, Pennsylvania
- Died: December 4, 1890 (aged 44) Philadelphia, Pennsylvania
- Resting place: West Laurel Hill Cemetery
- Spouse: Anita Hickman (before 1890)
- Relations: Edward J. Berwind (brother); Julia A. Berwind (sister); Robert E. Strawbridge Jr. (grandson)
- Children: 4

Charles Frederick Berwind (April 1, 1846 – December 4, 1890) was a founder of the Berwind-White Coal Mining Company, serving as its first president.

== Early life ==
Berwind was born on April 1, 1846, in Philadelphia, Pennsylvania. He was the eldest of five sons born to German immigrants Augusta (née Guldenferring) Berwind (1821–1904) and John Berwind (1813–1893). Among his siblings was Edward Julius Berwind, and sister Julia A. Berwind, a social welfare activist.

== Career ==
After receiving an education in the public schools, he entered the office of R. H. Powel & Co. as an office boy in 1861. He was rapidly promoted and, in 1863, when Powelton Coal and Iron Company was formed, he was made assistant to the president before being promoted to vice-president upon reaching the age of majority. In 1869, he formed Berwin & Bradley, taking over the coal business of the Powelton company. In 1874, Berwind joined White & Lingle.

In 1886, Berwind went into business with his younger brother, Edward, and Judge Allison White; co-founding Berwind, White & Company, which was incorporated as Berwind-White. The Berwinds worked closely with J. P. Morgan in the consolidation, reorganization, integration, and expansion of his coal mining operations. After his death in 1890, his brother Edward became sole manager of the company.

Berwind served as president of the Pennsylvania and Northwestern Railroad Company, a director of the Girard Life Insurance Company, of the Girard National Bank and of various coal and lumber companies.

== Personal life ==
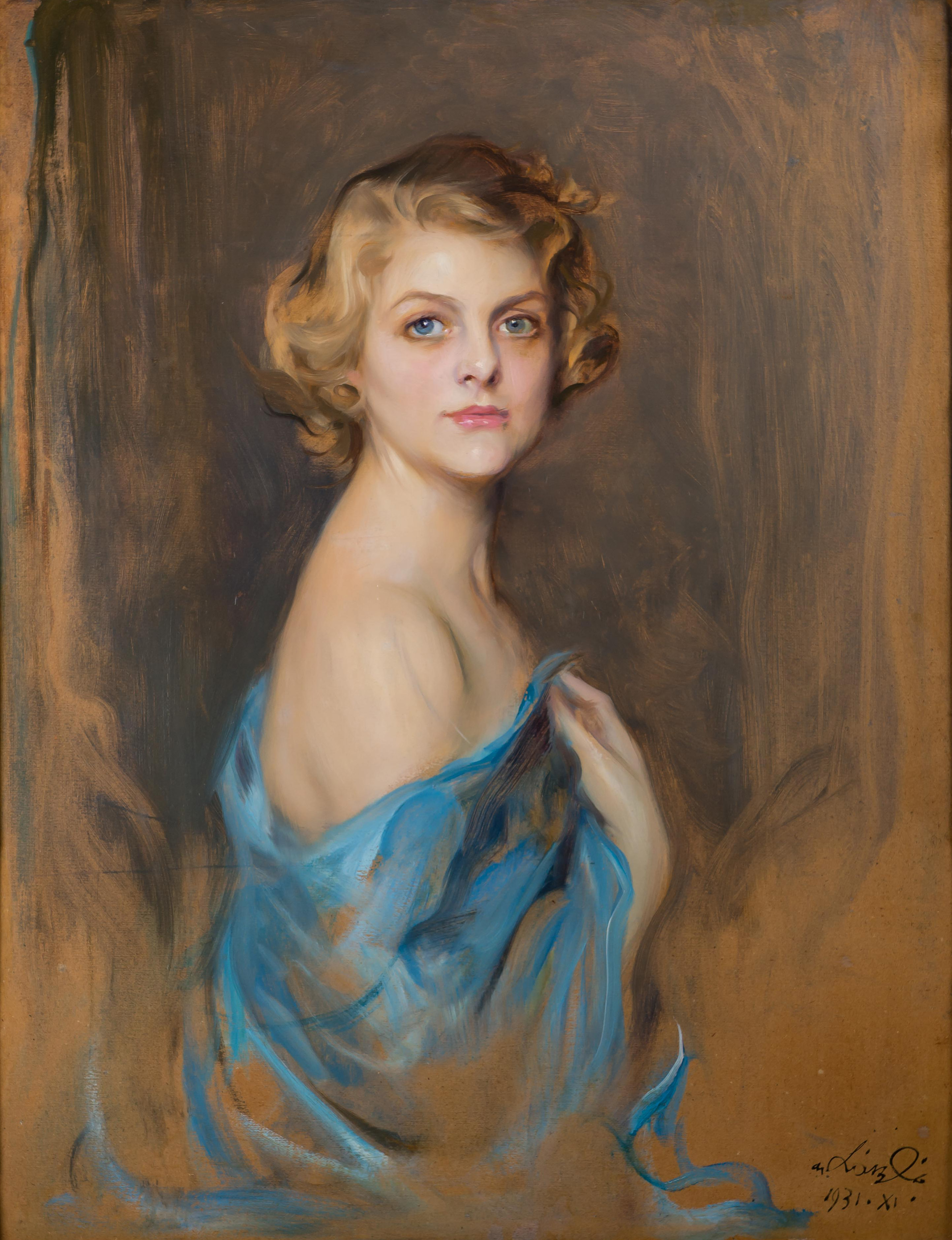
Portrait of his granddaughter, Anita (née Strawbridge) Grosvenor, by Philip de László, 1931.

Berwind was married to Anita Hickman (1852–1922), the daughter of Cheyney Hickman, a government director of the Bank of the United States. Anita was born in Río Cuarto, Argentina, where her family fled after her father committed financial fraud. Together, they were the parents of four daughters, two of whom married into the European aristocracy:

- Anita Berwind (1875–1942), who married Robert Early Strawbridge Sr., chairman of Strawbridge & Clothier, in 1895.
- Edith Berwind (1879–1963), who married Baron von Kleist of Geneva, Switzerland.
- Gertrude Berwind (1881–1929), who married Ruprecht, Baron Boecklin von Boecklinsau in 1900. They divorced in 1920 and she was "the first American woman to renounce a foreign marriage after the World War."
- Frederica Vesta Berwind (1884–1954), who married Charles Gilpin III (1878–1950) in 1903. They divorced in January 1911 and she married banker Henry Herman Harjes in 1911. After his death in 1926, she married Seton Porter.

Berwind died of Bright's disease at his residence in Philadelphia on December 4, 1890. His widow died at the home of their youngest daughter Frederica in Paris in April 1922.

=== Estate and descendants ===
In 1918, during World War I, Alien Property Custodian A. Mitchell Palmer took over the property and trust funds of American women who had married Germans and Austrians and that of the German and Austrian heirs of such former American women. At the time, Gertrude, Baroness von Boecklin of Rust, Ringsheim in Baden, Germany, had her assets seized, which included the more than $300,000 in property that was placed in trust from her father's estate.

Through his daughter Edith, he was a grandfather of Alta von Kleist (d. 1967), who first married Count James de Martino of Rome in 1933. Asta later married Jean Paul-Boncour (the French Ambassador to Argentina and Thailand whose brother, Joseph Paul-Boncour, was the Prime Minister of France).

Through his daughter Gertrude, he was a grandfather of Baron Ruprecht von Boecklin of 277 Park Avenue, who inherited the Baroness' estate upon her death.

Through his daughter Anita, he was a grandfather of Anita Strawbridge (wife of Lt. Cmdr. Theodore Phinney Grosvenor, US Navy), and Robert Early Strawbridge Jr. (1896–1986), a polo champion and chairman of the United States Polo Association.

== See also ==
- Wilmore Steamship Company
