= SS Henry W. Grady =

World War II Liberty ship of the United States

History

United States
- Name: Henry W. Grady
- Namesake: Henry W. Grady
- Owner: War Shipping Administration (WSA)
- Operator: Wilmore Steamship Company
- Ordered: as type (EC2-S-C1) hull, MC hull 1501
- Builder: J.A. Jones Construction, Brunswick, Georgia
- Cost: $1,827,324
- Yard number: 117
- Way number: 1
- Laid down: 31 July 1943
- Launched: 22 October 1943
- Completed: 30 October 1943
- Identification: Call Signal: KYPV
- Fate: Laid up in National Defense Reserve Fleet, James River Group, Lee Hall, Virginia, 9 May 1946; Laid up in National Defense Reserve Fleet, Beaumont, Texas, 19 May 1952; Sold for scrapping, 22 June 1971

General characteristics
- Class & type: Liberty ship; type EC2-S-C1, standard
- Tonnage: 10,865 LT DWT; 7,176 GRT
- Displacement: 3,380 long tons (3,434 t) (light); 14,245 long tons (14,474 t) (max)
- Length: 441 feet 6 inches (135 m) oa; 416 feet (127 m) pp; 427 feet (130 m) lwl
- Beam: 57 feet (17 m)
- Draft: 27 ft 9.25 in (8.4646 m)
- Installed power: 2 × Oil fired 450 °F (232 °C) boilers, operating at 220 psi (1,500 kPa); 2,500 hp (1,900 kW)
- Propulsion: 1 × triple-expansion steam engine, (manufactured by General Machinery Corp., Hamilton, Ohio); 1 × screw propeller
- Speed: 11.5 knots (21.3 km/h; 13.2 mph)
- Capacity: 562,608 cubic feet (15,931 m^{3}) (grain); 499,573 cubic feet (14,146 m^{3}) (bale)
- Complement: 38–62 USMM; 21–40 USNAG
- Armament: Varied by ship; Bow-mounted 3-inch (76 mm)/50-caliber gun; Stern-mounted 4-inch (102 mm)/50-caliber gun; 2–8 × single 20-millimeter (0.79 in) Oerlikon anti-aircraft (AA) cannons and/or, 2–8 × 37-millimeter (1.46 in) M1 AA guns

SS Henry W. Grady was a Liberty ship built in the United States during World War II. She was named after Henry W. Grady, a journalist.

== Construction ==
Henry W. Grady was laid down on 31 July 1943, under a Maritime Commission (MARCOM) contract, MC hull 1501, by J.A. Jones Construction, Brunswick, Georgia, and launched on 22 October 1943.

== History ==
She was allocated to Wilmore Steamship Company, on 30 October 1943. On 9 May 1946, she was laid up in the National Defense Reserve Fleet (NDRF) in the James River Group, Lee Hall, Virginia. On 19 May 1952, she was laid up in the NDRF in Beaumont, Texas. On 22 June 1971, she was sold to Consolidated Steel Corporation, for $42,000, for scrapping. She was delivered on 21 July 1971.

== Bibliography ==
- "Jones Construction, Brunswick GA". ShipbuildingHistory.com. 13 October 2010.
- "Liberty Ships – World War II".
- Maritime Administration. "Henry W. Grady". Ship History Database Vessel Status Card. U.S. Department of Transportation, Maritime Administration. Archived from the original on 12 December 2019.
- Davies, James (May 2004). "Specifications (As-Built)" (PDF). p. 23.
- "SS Henry W. Grady".
