= SS Dominator =

World War II Liberty ship of the United States

Coordinates: 33°46′26″N 118°25′42″W

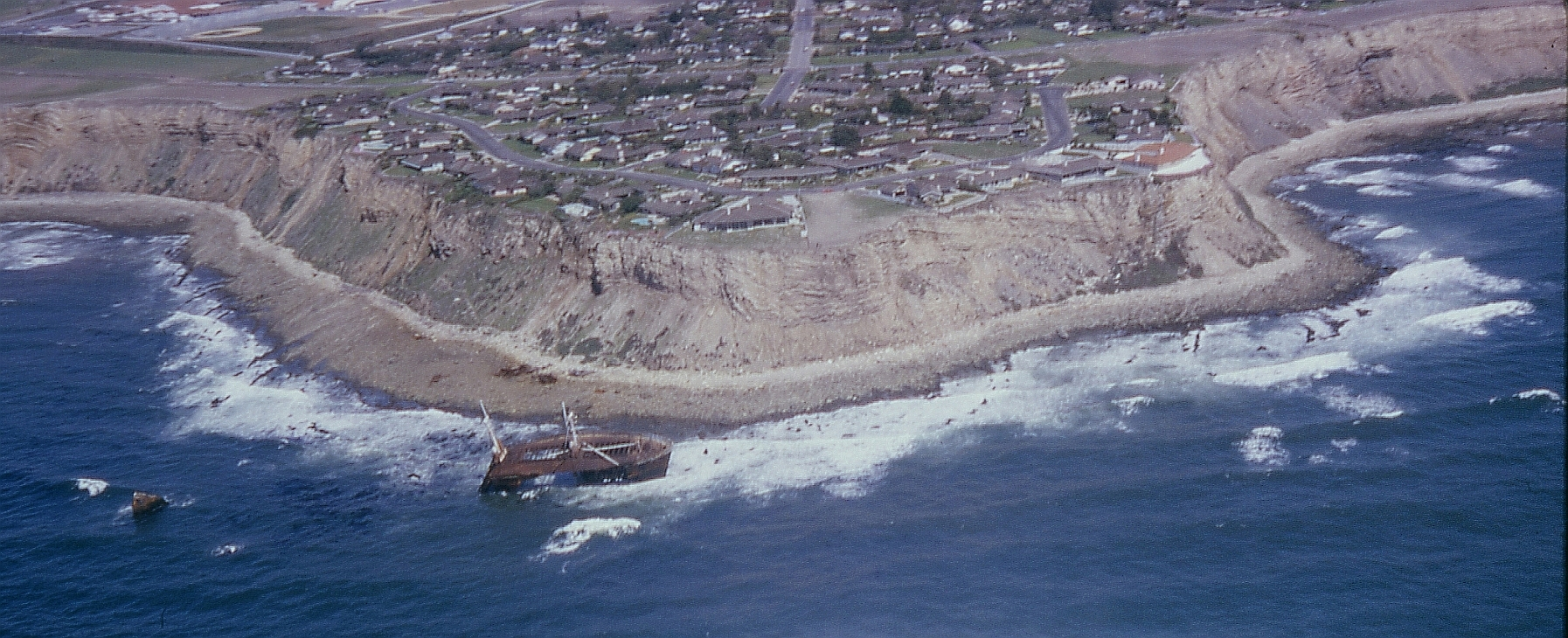
- The wreck of SS Dominator in 1965

History

United States
- Name: Melville Jacoby
- Namesake: War correspondent Melville Jacoby
- Builder: Walsh-Kaiser Company, Providence, Rhode Island, US
- Yard number: 3119
- Way number: 3
- Laid down: 27 October 1943
- Launched: 18 January 1944
- Completed: 31 March 1944
- Fate: Sold into commercial service, 1947

Panama
- Name: Victoria (1947–1950); North Queen (1950–1953); Dominator (1953–1961)
- Fate: Wrecked, 13 March 1961

General characteristics
- Class & type: Type EC2-S-C1 Liberty ship
- Displacement: 14,245 long tons (14,474 t)
- Length: 441 ft 6 in (134.57 m) o/a; 417 ft 9 in (127.33 m) p/p; 427 ft (130 m) w/l
- Beam: 57 ft (17 m)
- Draft: 27 ft 9 in (8.46 m)
- Propulsion: Two oil-fired boilers; Triple-expansion steam engine; 2,500 hp (1,900 kW); Single screw
- Speed: 11 knots (20 km/h; 13 mph)
- Range: 20,000 nmi (37,000 km; 23,000 mi)
- Capacity: 10,856 t (10,685 long tons) deadweight (DWT)
- Crew: 81
- Armament: Stern-mounted 4 in (100 mm) deck gun for use against surfaced submarines, variety of anti-aircraft guns

SS Dominator, a freighter, ran ashore on the Palos Verdes Peninsula in the South Bay area of California in 1961 due to a navigational error while lost in fog. Its remains can still be seen today and serves as a point of interest for hikers and kayakers.

== Ship history ==
The ship was originally the American Liberty ship Melville Jacoby, built during World War II at the Walsh-Kaiser Company shipyard in Providence, Rhode Island, and launched on March 31, 1944. It was named after the journalist Melville Jacoby, who, after reporting on the war in China and narrowly escaping capture at Corregidor, was killed in an air crash in 1942.

During the war the ship was operated by the Wilmore Steamship Company of Boston, on behalf of the War Shipping Administration. In 1947 she was sold into commercial service, and flying the Panamanian flag, was renamed SS Victoria. She changed hands in 1950, and was renamed SS North Queen, then again in 1953 becoming SS Dominator.

== The wreck ==
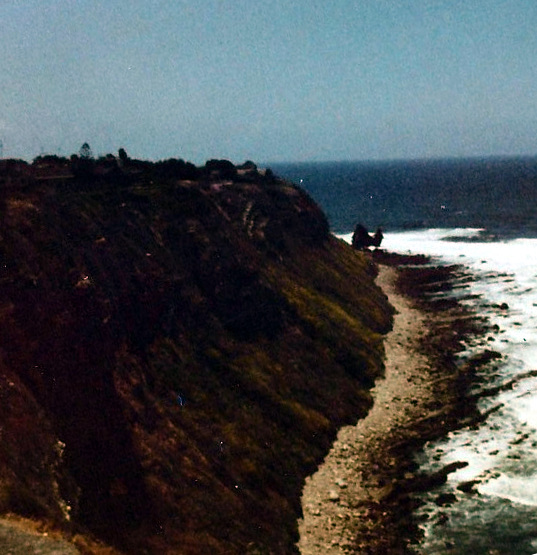
Viewing the Dominator from the southern trailhead 1981

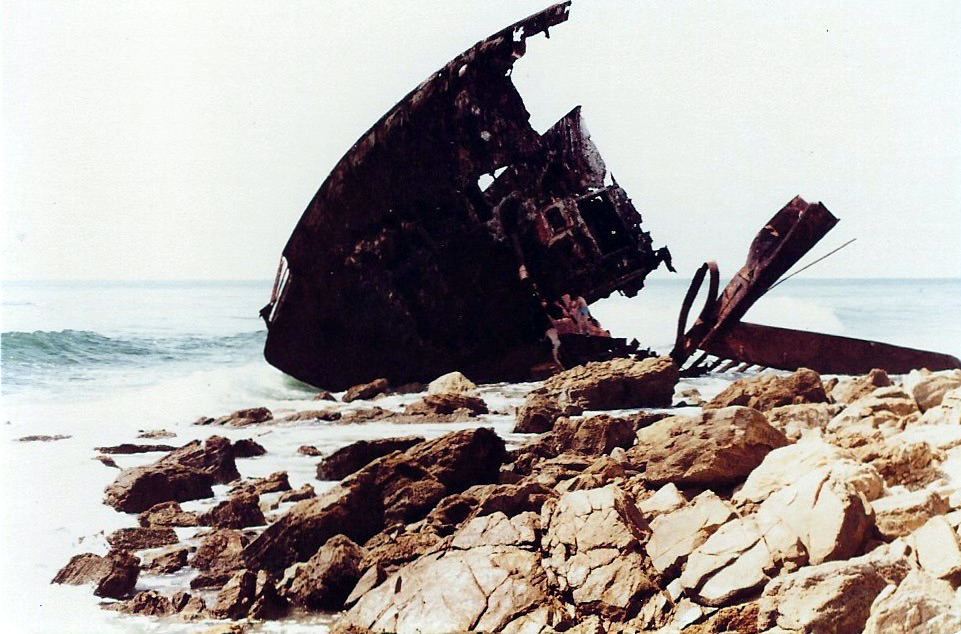
The remains of Dominator, circa 1981

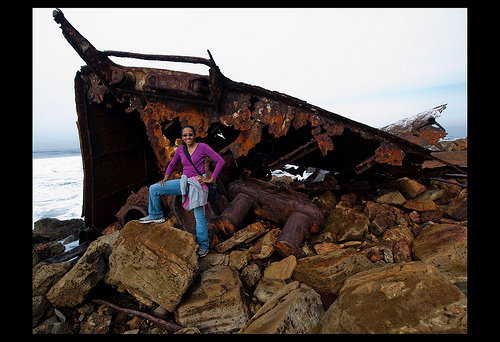
Dominator in late 2009

On March 13, 1961, Dominator was en route to Los Angeles from Vancouver with a cargo of wheat and beef when she ran aground off Palos Verdes, California. For two days, the Coast Guard and tugboats attempted to refloat her, but heavy seas and high winds only forced her higher onto the rocks. After two days the crew abandoned ship. The stranded ship was then auctioned, and hull and cargo were sold separately, which led to some conflict between the salvors, as they attempted to gain what they could. Eventually, the ship slowly broke up under the pounding of the waves, and with large pieces of wreckage scattered over the shore. As of 2024, wreckage can still be seen.
