= McCabe v. Atchison, Topeka & Santa Fe Railway Co. =

- Supreme Court of the United States

Argued October 26, 1914 Decided November 30, 1914
- Full case name: McCabe v. Atchison, Topeka & Santa Fe Railway Co.
- Citations: 235 U.S. 151 (more) 35 S. Ct. 69; 59 L. Ed. 169

Court membership
- Chief Justice Edward D. White Associate Justices Joseph McKenna · Oliver W. Holmes Jr. William R. Day · Charles E. Hughes; Willis Van Devanter · Joseph R. Lamar; Mahlon Pitney · James C. McReynolds

Case opinions
- Majority: Hughes
- Concurrence: White, Holmes, Lamar, McReynolds

McCabe v. Atchison, Topeka & Santa Fe Railway Company, 235 U.S. 151 (1914), was a United States Supreme Court case in which the Court ruled that an Oklahoma law was unconstitutional insofar as it did not provide dining cars and other luxury accommodations for African-American passengers, however the Court also ruled that the litigants were not entitled to equitable relief because they lacked standing to assert constitutional claims on behalf of others.

== Statute ==
The Separate Coach Law required railroads to provide separate, but equal, compartments for African-American and Caucasian passengers. Section 7 of the law allowed the railroads to provide sleeping cars, dining cars and chair cars for both white and black patrons. However, in practice, the railroads provided fewer services to African Americans because of lower anticipated demand.

== Facts ==
Four African-American citizens filed suit against the railroads seeking to restrain them from complying with the law. They filed suit against the railroads before the law went into effect but amended their claim after the law became effective.

The United States Court of Appeals for the Eighth Circuit upheld an order sustaining the railroads' demurrers and dismissing the suit. Appellants sought review.

== Decision ==
The court affirmed the appellate court's order.

- The court held that section 7 of the law was improperly enacted based on the consideration of the limited demand by African-Americans for sleeping, dining, and chair cars.
- However, appellants' suit was properly dismissed because appellants had not traveled on any of the railroads, requested transportation on the railroads, or requested any of the facilities described in section 7 of the law.
- Further, there was no proof that the railroads had refused to provide the facilities described in section 7 of the law to appellants.
- Finally, there was no proof that appellants would not have had an adequate remedy at law if the railroads had denied equal facilities to appellants.

== See also ==
- United States v. Santa Fe Pacific Railroad Co.
- List of United States Supreme Court cases, volume 235
