= SS Edward P. Alexander =

World War II Liberty ship of the United States

History

United States
- Name: Edward P. Alexander
- Namesake: Edward P. Alexander
- Ordered: as type (EC2-S-C1) hull, MC hull 1505
- Builder: J.A. Jones Construction, Brunswick, Georgia
- Cost: $1,501,325
- Yard number: 121
- Way number: 5
- Laid down: 21 September 1943
- Launched: 23 November 1943
- Sponsored by: Mrs. E.A. Lotz
- Completed: 30 November 1943
- Identification: Call Signal: KUGH
- Fate: Sold, 7 January 1947

Italy
- Name: Orizia
- Owner: Fratelli D'Amico, Rome
- Acquired: 20 January 1947
- Fate: Scrapped, 1970

General characteristics
- Class & type: Liberty ship; type EC2-S-C1, standard
- Tonnage: 10,865 LT DWT; 7,176 GRT
- Displacement: 3,380 long tons (3,434 t) (light); 14,245 long tons (14,474 t) (max)
- Length: 441 feet 6 inches (135 m) oa; 416 feet (127 m) pp; 427 feet (130 m) lwl
- Beam: 57 feet (17 m)
- Draft: 27 ft 9.25 in (8.4646 m)
- Installed power: 2 × Oil fired 450 °F (232 °C) boilers, operating at 220 psi (1,500 kPa); 2,500 hp (1,900 kW)
- Propulsion: 1 × triple-expansion steam engine, (manufactured by General Machinery Corp., Hamilton, Ohio); 1 × screw propeller
- Speed: 11.5 knots (21.3 km/h; 13.2 mph)
- Capacity: 562,608 cubic feet (15,931 m^{3}) (grain); 499,573 cubic feet (14,146 m^{3}) (bale)
- Complement: 38–62 USMM; 21–40 USNAG
- Armament: Varied by ship; Bow-mounted 3-inch (76 mm)/50-caliber gun; Stern-mounted 4-inch (102 mm)/50-caliber gun; 2–8 × single 20-millimeter (0.79 in) Oerlikon anti-aircraft (AA) cannons and/or, 2–8 × 37-millimeter (1.46 in) M1 AA guns

SS Edward P. Alexander was a Liberty ship built in the United States during World War II. She was named after Edward P. Alexander, a Confederate States Army Brigadier general and railroad executive.

== Construction ==
Edward P. Alexander was laid down on 21 September 1943, under a United States Maritime Commission (MARCOM) contract, MC hull 1505, by J.A. Jones Construction, Brunswick, Georgia; sponsored by Mrs. E.A. Lotz, and launched on 23 November 1943.

== History ==
She was allocated to the Wilmore Steamship Company, on 30 November 1943. On 15 June 1946, she was laid up in the National Defense Reserve Fleet in the James River Group, Lee Hall, Virginia. On 7 January 1947, she was turned over to the Italian Government, which in turn sold her to Fratelli d'Amico, Rome, for $544,506, on 20 January 1947. She was renamed Orizia. She ran aground off Veracruz Harbor on 20 January 1963, and was scrapped in 1970.

== Bibliography ==
- "Jones Construction, Brunswick GA". ShipbuildingHistory.com. 13 October 2010.
- "Liberty Ships – World War II".
- Maritime Administration. "Edward P. Alexander". Ship History Database Vessel Status Card. U.S. Department of Transportation, Maritime Administration. Archived from the original on 12 December 2019.
- Davies, James (May 2004). "Specifications (As-Built)" (PDF). p. 23.
- "SS Edward P. Alexander".
