= Wilmore Heights, Pennsylvania =

Populated place in Pennsylvania, U.S.

Coordinates: 40°22′40″N 78°42′57″W

Wilmore Heights is a populated place in Cambria County, Pennsylvania.

== See also ==
- Wilmore Coal Company
