= Julia Berwind =

American socialite and social welfare activist (1865-1961)

Julia A. Berwind
- Born: May 27, 1865; Philadelphia, Pennsylvania, U.S.
- Died: May 16, 1961 (aged 95)
- Resting place: West Laurel Hill Cemetery, Bala Cynwyd, Pennsylvania, U.S.
- Occupation: Social welfare activist
- Relatives: Charles F. Berwind (brother); Edward Julius Berwind (brother)

Julia A. Berwind (May 27, 1865 - May 16, 1961) was an American socialite, and social welfare activist. She inherited her brother Edward Julius Berwind's $31 million estate including The Elms in Newport, Rhode Island.

== Biography ==
She was born on May 27, 1865, in Philadelphia, the sister of coal magnates Edward Julius Berwind and Charles Frederick Berwind. After Edward's wife died in 1922, he invited Julia to live with him and help host his social functions. When her brother Edward died in 1936, she was the principal beneficiary of his estate valued at $31 million in 1942.

She lived in The Elms when in Newport, Rhode Island, and the Savoy-Plaza Hotel when in New York City. The Elms required 30 servants to support the mansion at its peak. She was known to drive her Renault car around Newport, Rhode Island, which was unusual for women in general and for women of her class in particular.

She served as president of the Social Service Committee for the Beekman Downtown Hospital from 1928 to 1939.

In 1953, she donated the painting Self-Portrait with Two Pupils by Adélaïde Labille-Guiard to the Metropolitan Museum of Art.

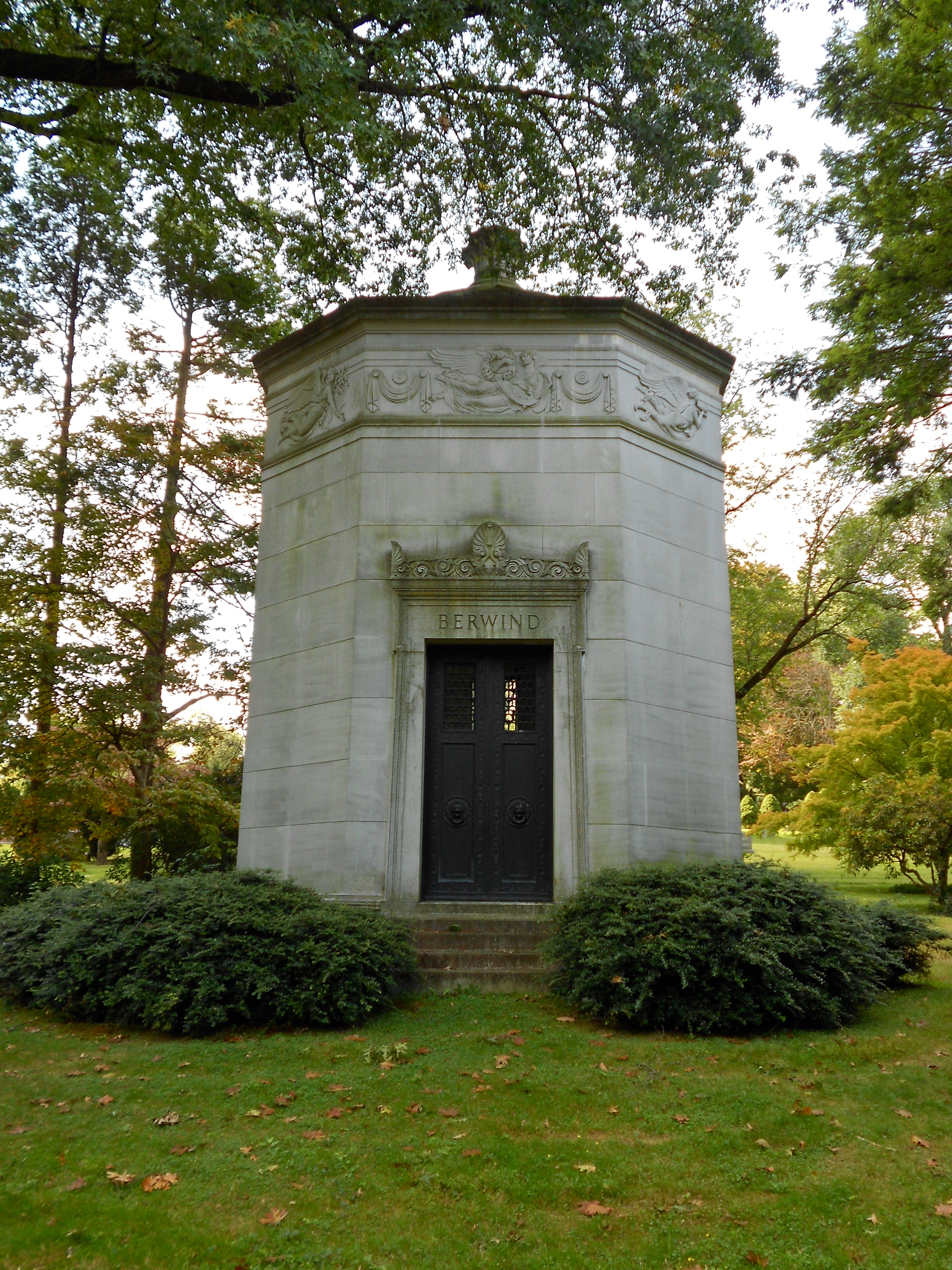
Berwind mausoleum in West Laurel Hill Cemetery

She never married and died in Newport, Rhode Island on May 16, 1961. She was interred at West Laurel Hill Cemetery in Bala Cynwyd, Pennsylvania.

After her death, The Elms, was sold to the Preservation Society of Newport County in 1962 and opened to the public.
