= Edward Julius Berwind =

American businessman (1848–1936)

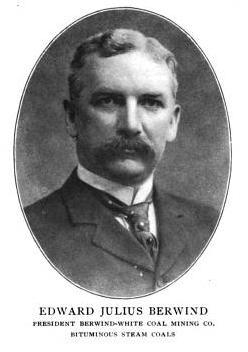

President of Berwind-White Coal Mining Company
- In office 1890–1930
- Preceded by: Charles Frederick Berwind
- Succeeded by: Charles E. Dunlap

Personal details
- Born: June 17, 1848 Philadelphia, Pennsylvania, U.S.
- Died: August 18, 1936 (aged 88) New York City, New York, U.S.
- Resting place: West Laurel Hill Cemetery, Bala Cynwyd, Pennsylvania, U.S.
- Party: Republican
- Spouse: Sarah Vesta Herminie Torrey (m. 1886; died 1922)
- Relations: Charles F. Berwind (brother); Julia A. Berwind (sister)
- Education: United States Naval Academy

Edward Julius Berwind (June 17, 1848 – August 18, 1936) was an American coal baron who co-founded the Berwind-White Coal Mining Company with his brother Charles Frederick Berwind and Allison White. Berwind served as the second president of the company from 1890 to 1930. He was considered the largest single owner of coal properties in the United States and his agreements to supply coal to the United States Navy, Pennsylvania Railroad, and international shipping lines were considered a monopoly. He owned six coal companies and the Berwind National Bank. He served as a director for approximately 50 companies including banks, coal, railway, and international shipping companies.

His summer home, The Elms, in Newport, Rhode Island, was designed by architect Horace Trumbauer and was filled with Berwind's art collection.

== Early life ==
Berwind was born on June 17, 1848, in Philadelphia, Pennsylvania. He was one of five sons born to German immigrants Augusta (née Guldenferring) Berwind and John Berwind. Among his siblings was brother Charles Frederick Berwind, the first president of Berwind-White, and sister Julia A. Berwind, a social welfare activist who in later life lived with Edward.

Berwind was appointed to the United States Naval Academy at Annapolis, Maryland, in July 1865 by President Abraham Lincoln, and graduated in June 1869 as a midshipman. He was promoted to ensign in July 1870 and to master (equivalent to the modern rank of lieutenant, junior grade) in March 1872. He served during the Franco-Prussian War and the Spanish–American War. As an ensign, met the Prince of Wales, later King Edward VII, who became a lifelong friend of Berwind.

During the Grant administration, he served as a naval aide at the White House.

He was placed on the Retired List in May 1875.

== Career ==
In January 1886, Berwind co-founded the Berwind-White Coal Mining Company with his older brother, Charles Frederick Berwind, and Allison White. The company opened its first mine in Houtzdale, Pennsylvania, and by 1897, Berwind-White opened the first of 13 coal mines in Somerset County, Pennsylvania. Berwind negotiated agreements with international shipping lines and the Pennsylvania Railroad to purchase coal from Berwind-White. The company purchased large amounts of land in Somerset County and partnered with Babcock Lumber Company to harvest timber on the land while Berwind-White maintained the mineral rights.

Berwind worked closely with J. P. Morgan in the consolidation, reorganization, integration, and expansion of his coal mining operations. He was considered to be the largest single owner of coal mining properties in the United States. The contracts to supply coal to the United States Navy, shipping companies, and railroads were considered a monopoly. Berwind also refused to bargain with his employees, making his mines among the last open shops in the coal fields.

He served as president of six coal companies and director at four others including as chairman of the board of Colorado Fuel and Iron. He served as a director at approximately 50 companies including multiple railway companies such as the Erie Railway, the Atchison, Topeka and Santa Fe Railway, the Interborough Rapid Transit Company, the New York and Long Island Traction Company, and the New York and Queens County Railway. He was a director of several banks and trusts including the Girard Trust and Berwind National Bank. He was a director in the Atlantic, Gulf & West Indies Steamship Lines, the Clyde Steamship Company, and the International Mercantile Marine Company. He was a shareholder in the conglomerate led by J. P. Morgan to purchase the Tennessee Coal, Iron and Railroad Company for U.S. Steel. He retired from his businesses in 1930.

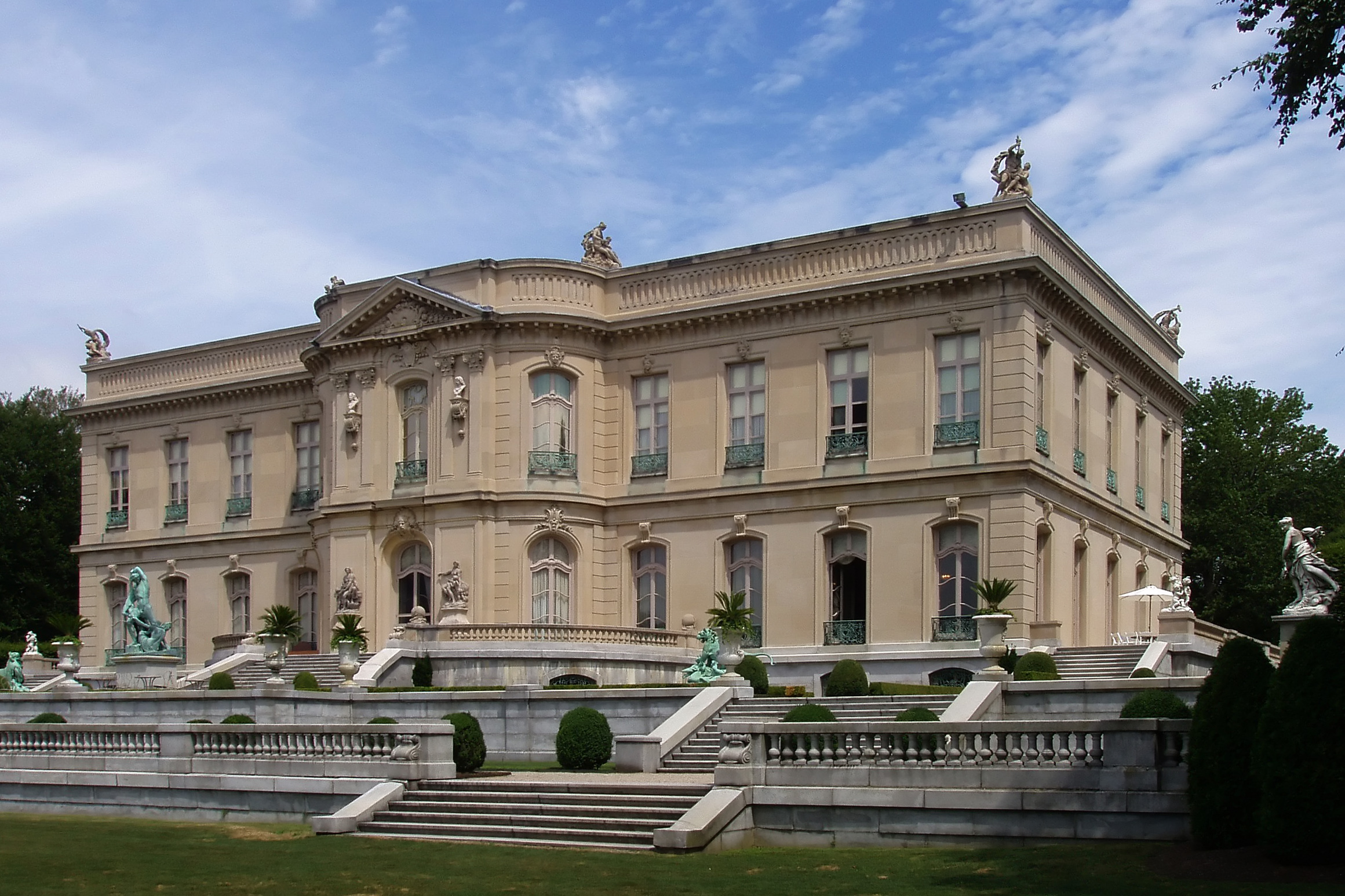
The Elms was Berwind's summer home in Newport, Rhode Island

In 1899, Berwind built his Châteauesque summer home in Newport, Rhode Island, named The Elms. It was designed by architect Horace Trumbauer and was modeled after the French Château d'Asnières built for the Marquis de Voyer in 1750. It replaced an Italianate cottage that Berwind had used for summer vacations since 1888. The interior and furnishings were designed by Jules Allard and Sons and the mansion contained Berwind's collection of 18th century French and Venetian paintings, Oriental jades, and Renaissance ceramics. He owned works by Boucher, Drouais, and Antoine Watteau. The gardens contained sculptures including some from the château of Madame de Pompadour in France.

== Personal life ==
He was a member of the Philadelphia Club.

In 1886, Berwind was married to Sarah Vesta Herminie Torrey in Leghorn (Livorno), Italy, where her father was U.S. consular agent. They had no children, and she died in 1922. She left him no cash inheritance since "he did not need it" but did leave Berwind her jewels worth over $376,000. Her brother, Charles Franklin Torrey, inherited the remainder of her estate from her parents. After the death of his wife, Berwind's sister served as hostess for him in New York and Newport.

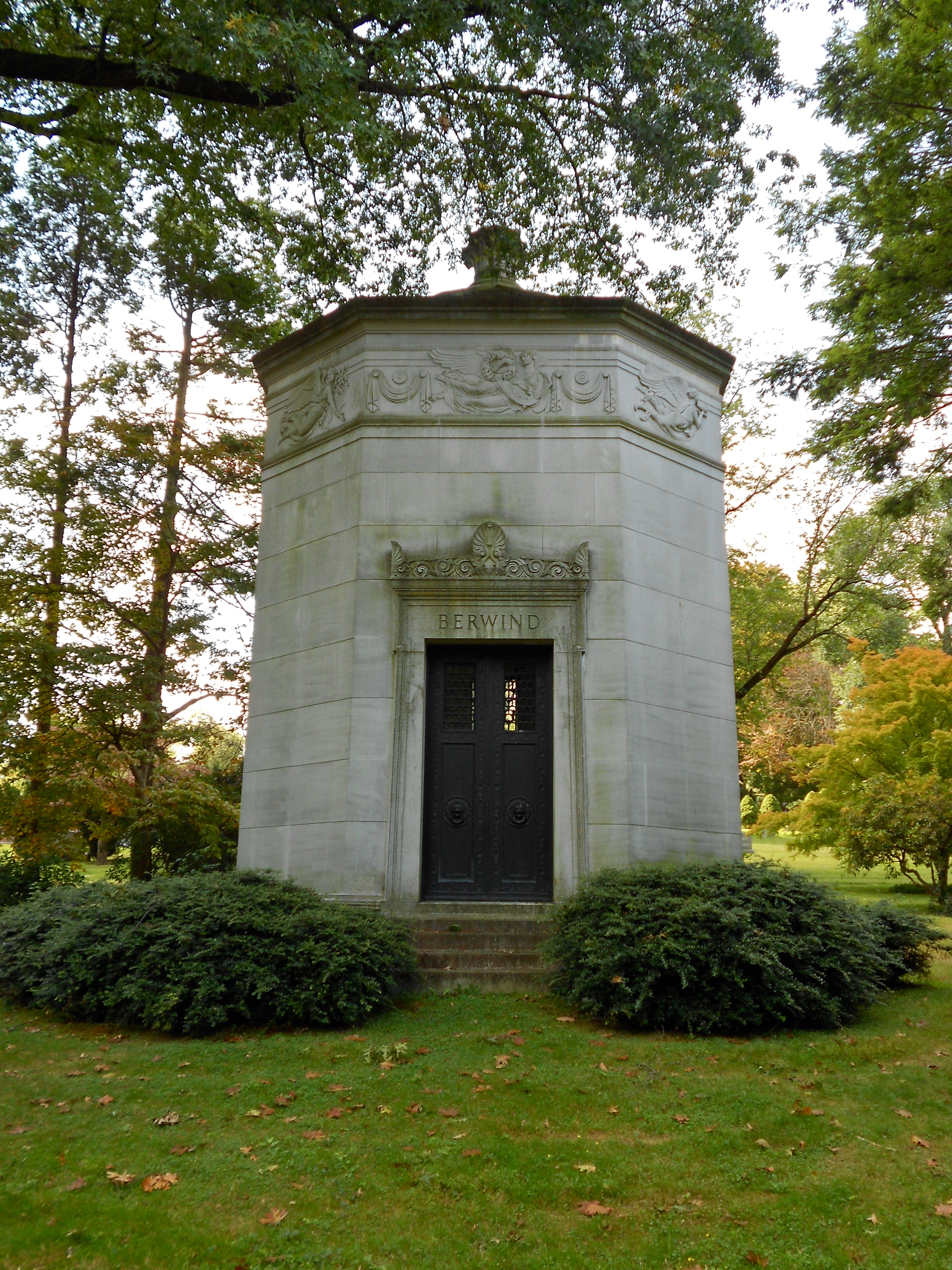
Berwind mausoleum in West Laurel Hill Cemetery

He died on August 18, 1936, at the Edward J. Berwind House in New York City. His net worth was valued at over $34 million, equivalent to $788,848,921 in 2025. After a funeral held at St. Thomas Church on Fifth Avenue in New York, he was buried in West Laurel Hill Cemetery in Bala Cynwyd, Pennsylvania. He was interred along with his wife, in a mausoleum modeled after the Tower of the Winds in Athens designed by Horace Trumbauer. His sister Julia and nephew, Charles E. Dunlap, were his principal beneficiaries.

== Legacy ==
The mining towns of Berwind, Colorado, and Berwind, West Virginia, were named after him. The borough of Windber, Pennsylvania, was named based on the recommendation of Berwind to transpose the two syllables of his last name.

The Edward J. Berwind House in Manhattan was inherited by his sister and sold in 1945 to the Institute of Aeronautical Sciences. In 1967, it was sold again for use as the offices of the New York Heart Association.

His summer home, The Elms, was sold to the Preservation Society of Newport County in 1962 and opened to the public.

== See also ==
- Old Philadelphians
- Wilmore Steamship Company
