= David Bancroft Johnson =

American university founder

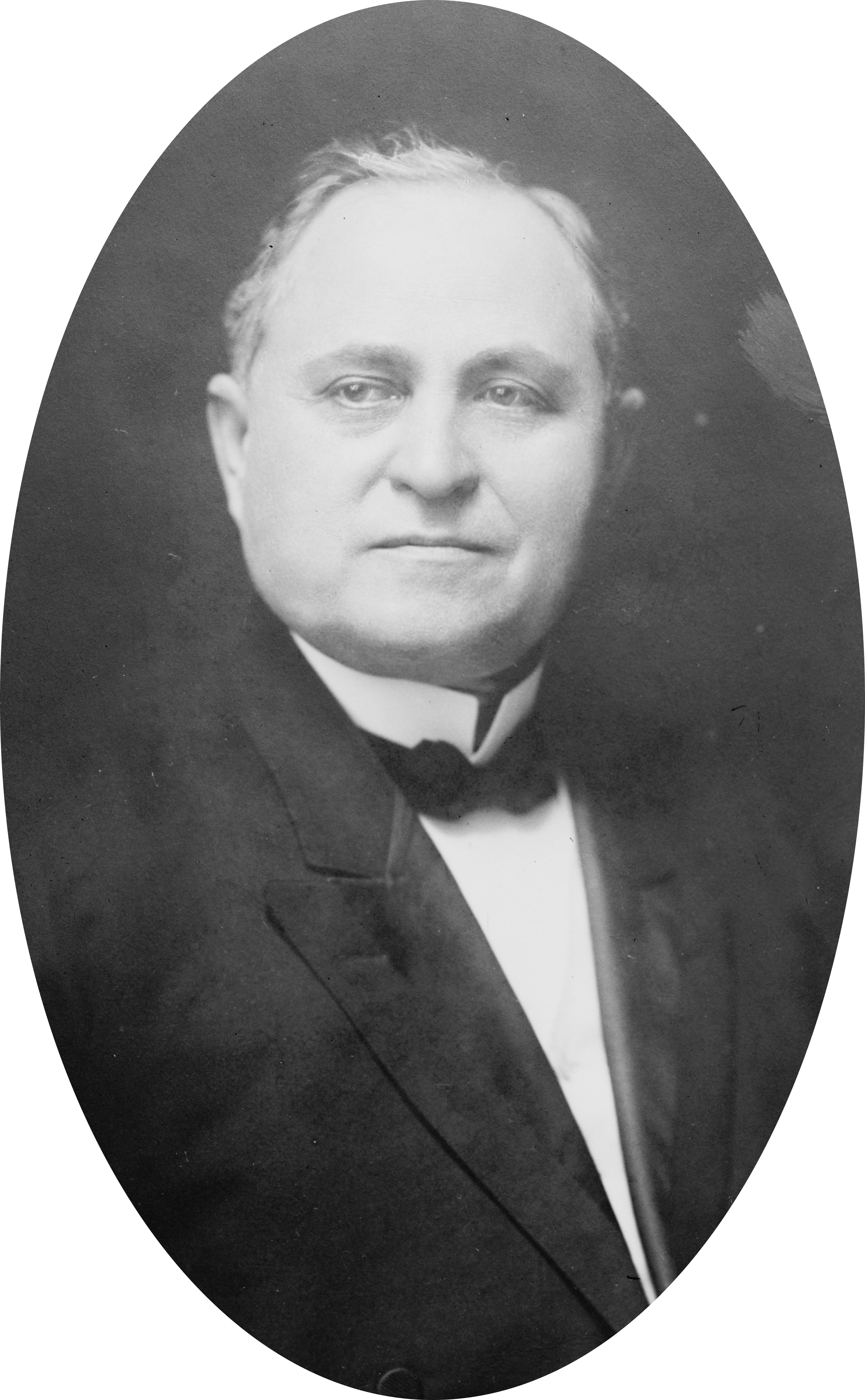
- Johnson circa 1915

1st President of Winthrop University

Personal details
- Born: January 10, 1856 La Grange, Tennessee
- Died: December 26, 1928 (aged 72) Rock Hill, South Carolina

David Bancroft Johnson, Jr. (January 10, 1856 - December 26, 1928) was the founder and first president of the "Winthrop Training School" for white women teachers, now Winthrop University.

== Biography ==
David Bancroft Johnson, Jr. was born on January 10, 1856, in La Grange, Tennessee, to David Bancroft Johnson, Sr. who died the following year.

In 1886, when Winthrop was founded, Johnson was serving as the school superintendent of Columbia, South Carolina, schools.

He died on December 26, 1928, in Rock Hill, South Carolina.
