= USS Berwind =

Patrol vessel of the United States Navy

History

United States
- Name: USS Berwind
- Namesake: Previous name retained
- Builder: Atlantic Boat and Motor Works
- Completed: 1912
- Acquired: 8 October 1917
- Fate: Returned to owner 5 November 1917
- Notes: Operated as civilian motorboat Berwind 1912-1917 and from November 1917

General characteristics
- Type: Patrol vessel
- Length: 35 ft (11 m)
- Beam: 7 ft 6 in (2.29 m)
- Draft: 1 ft 8 in (0.51 m) mean
- Speed: 10 miles per hour
- Complement: 2

USS Berwind (SP-1671) was a United States Navy patrol vessel briefly in service during 1917.

Berwind was built as a civilian motorboat of the same name in 1912 by the Atlantic Boat and Motor Works. On 8 October 1917, the U.S. Navy acquired her from her owner, the Berwind Fuel Company of Duluth, Minnesota, for use as a section patrol boat during World War I. She was given the section patrol number SP-1671.

Assigned to the 9th Naval District for use in patrolling the Great Lakes, Berwind was enrolled on the list of the district's vessels on 20 October 1917. However, she quickly proved unsuitable for naval use, and the Navy returned her to the Berwind Fuel Company on 5 November 1917.
