= Berwind-White Coal Mining Co. v. Chicago & Erie Railroad Co. =

Berwind-White Coal Mining Company v. Chicago and Erie Railroad Company
- Supreme Court of the United States

Argued December 3, 1914 Decided December 14, 1914
- Full case name: Berwind-White Coal Mining Company v. Chicago and Erie Railroad Company
- Citations: 235 U.S. 371 (more) 35 S. Ct. 131; 59 L. Ed. 275; 1914 U.S. LEXIS 978

Court membership
- Chief Justice Edward D. White Associate Justices Joseph McKenna · Oliver W. Holmes Jr. William R. Day · Charles E. Hughes; Willis Van Devanter · Joseph R. Lamar; Mahlon Pitney · James C. McReynolds

Case opinion
- Majority: White, joined by a unanimous court

Berwind-White Coal Mining Company v. Chicago and Erie Railroad Company, 235 U.S. 371 (1914), was a United States Supreme Court case involving a suit over demurrage of an Erie Railroad car used by Berwind-White Coal Mining Company to transport coal. The Court asserted that the filing of rates with the Interstate Commerce Commission complied with the notice requirements of the Act to Regulate Commerce and the point of reconsignment was clear under the company's usual practice for many years.
