= Paint, Pennsylvania =

Borough in Pennsylvania, US

- Borough
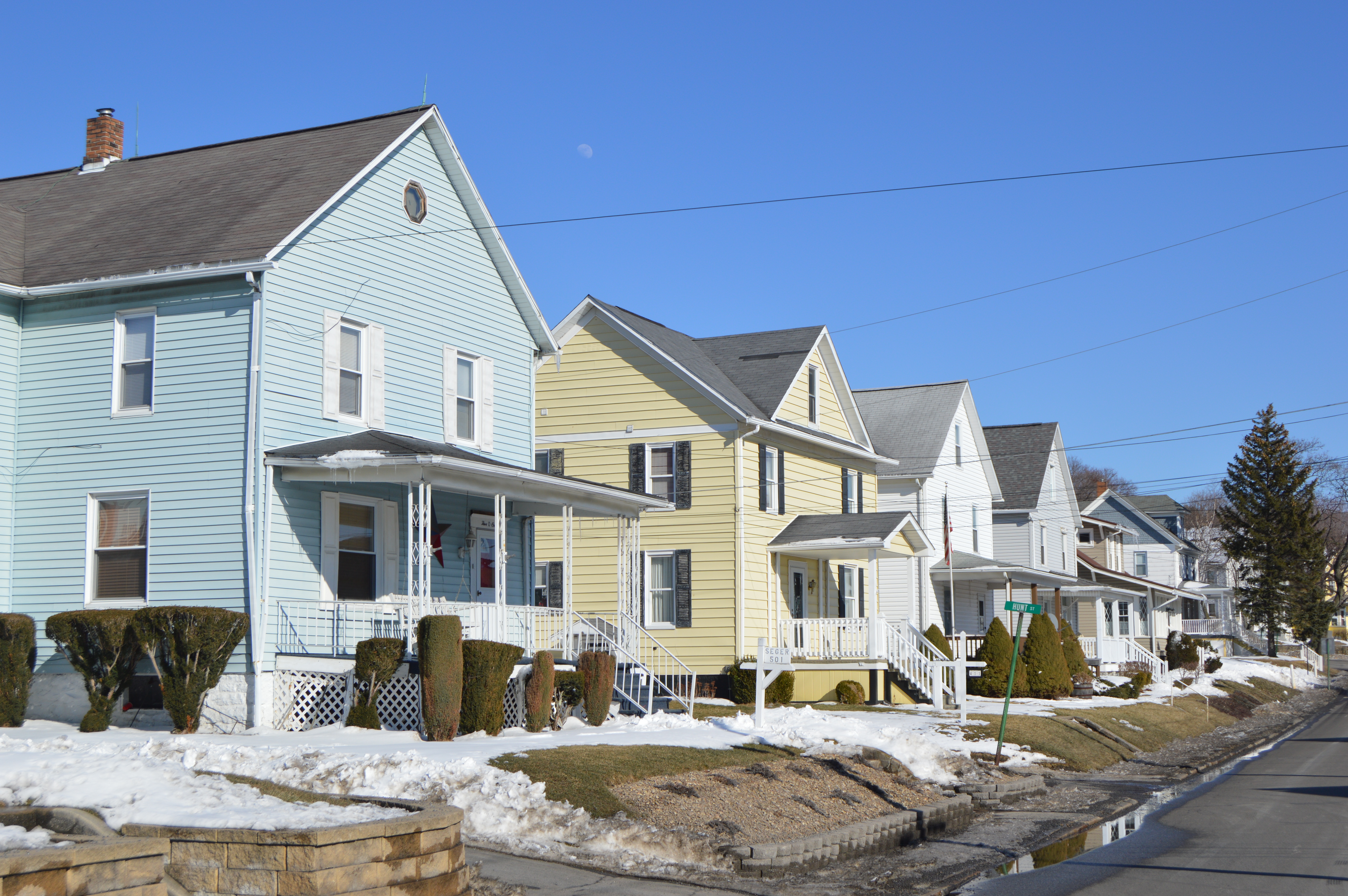
- Bedford St. in the historic district

- Location of Paint in Somerset County, Pennsylvania.

- Location within Pennsylvania
- Coordinates: 40°14′36″N 78°50′46″W
- Country: United States
- State: Pennsylvania
- County: Somerset
- Incorporated: 1900

Government
  - Type: Borough Council

Area
  - Total: 0.35 sq mi (0.90 km^{2})
  - Land: 0.35 sq mi (0.90 km^{2})
  - Water: 0 sq mi (0.00 km^{2})

Population (2020)
  - Total: 906
  - Density: 2,618.6/sq mi (1,011.05/km^{2})
- Time zone: UTC-5 (Eastern (EST))
  - Summer (DST): UTC-4 (EDT)
- Area code: 814
- FIPS code: 42-57544

Paint is a borough in Somerset County, Pennsylvania, United States. The population was 907 at the 2020 census. It is part of the Johnstown, Pennsylvania Metropolitan Statistical Area.

== History ==
The origin of the name "Paint" is obscure.

The Windber Historic District was listed on the National Register of Historic Places in 1991.

== Geography ==
Paint is located at 40°14′36″N 78°50′46″W (40.243423, -78.846092).

According to the United States Census Bureau, the borough has a total area of 0.3 square miles (0.78 km^{2}), all land.

== Surrounding neighborhoods ==
Paint has three borders, including Scalp Level in Cambria County to the north, Windber to the east, and Paint Township from the south to the northwest.

== Demographics ==
Historical population
Census	Pop.	Note	%±
1910	999		—
1920	1,283		28.4%
1930	1,336		4.1%
1940	1,700		27.2%
1950	1,547		−9.0%
1960	1,275		−17.6%
1970	1,233		−3.3%
1980	1,177		−4.5%
1990	1,091		−7.3%
2000	1,103		1.1%
2010	1,023		−7.3%
2020	906		−11.4%
2021 (est.)	899	▼	−0.8%

As of the census of 2000, there were 1,103 people, 397 households, and 273 families residing in the borough. The population density was 3,152.5 inhabitants per square mile (1,217.2/km^{2}). There were 432 housing units at an average density of 1,234.7 per square mile (476.7/km^{2}). The racial makeup of the borough was 98.37% White, 0.54% African American, 0.18% Asian, and 0.91% from two or more races. Hispanic or Latino of any race were 0.18% of the population.

There were 397 households, out of which 25.9% had children under the age of 18 living with them, 52.4% were married couples living together, 11.1% had a female householder with no husband present, and 31.0% were non-families. 29.2% of all households were made up of individuals, and 19.9% had someone living alone who was 65 years of age or older. The average household size was 2.31 and the average family size was 2.83.

In the borough the population was spread out, with 17.9% under the age of 18, 4.7% from 18 to 24, 21.4% from 25 to 44, 17.6% from 45 to 64, and 38.4% who were 65 years of age or older. The median age was 51 years. For every 100 females there were 77.6 males. For every 100 females age 18 and over, there were 71.9 males.

The median income for a household in the borough was $28,571, and the median income for a family was $35,833. Males had a median income of $25,179 versus $18,611 for females. The per capita income for the borough was $14,351. About 7.0% of families and 9.5% of the population were below the poverty line, including 17.6% of those under age 18 and 8.6% of those age 65 or over.
