= Berwind P. Kaufmann =

American geneticist (1897-1975)

- Born: April 23, 1897; Philadelphia, Pennsylvania
- Died: September 12, 1975 (aged 78)
- Education: University of Pennsylvania (B.Sc. 1918, M.A. 1920, Ph.D. 1925)
- Known for: Identification of specialized regions of chromosomes
- Scientific career
- Fields: Botany, cytogenetics
- Workplaces: Southwestern College, Memphis, Tennessee; University of Alabama; Carnegie Institution of Washington); Cold Spring Harbor Laboratory, Long Island

Berwind P. Kaufmann (April 23, 1897 – September 12, 1975) was an American biologist. After starting off as a botanist looking at plant chromosomes, he made pioneering contributions to three principal fields of basic cytogenetics:

- the formation of chromosomal rearrangements by exposure to ionizing radiation;
- the identification of specialized regions (the nucleolar organizer and heterochromatic regions) of the somatic chromosomes of the fruit fly Drosophila;
- and the determination of the biochemical composition of both plant and animal chromosomes using purified enzymes.

== Career ==
Kaufmann was born in Philadelphia, Pennsylvania. He stayed in his hometown and attended the University of Pennsylvania, receiving his B.Sc. degree in 1918, M.A. in 1920, and Ph.D. in 1925. His doctoral thesis dealt with the structure of the chromosomes of Tradescantia and led to a major publication. In 1926 he went to Southwestern College, Memphis, Tennessee, where he taught biology. He left in 1929 to become professor and chairman of the Department of Botany at the University of Alabama. He took a sabbatical leave in 1932–1933 at the California Institute of Technology. He left Alabama in 1936 to go to the Department of Genetics of the Carnegie Institution of Washington at the Cold Spring Harbor Laboratory on Long Island, New York where he remained for 25 years, the balance of his career.

== Anecdote ==
In a biographical memoir of Berwind Kaufmann, the Nobel Prize-winning geneticist Ed Lewis recounted the following story:

"His life at the University of Alabama was made miserable at one point when he was unwilling to pass some members of the football team. He had them over to his house and not only patiently tutored them but even watered down the tests somewhat, but they still could not pass. He was told by the administration that the team was Rose Bowl material and that he had to pass them. When he refused, the administration put the low-scoring students in the hands of a more malleable faculty member, with the result that the team kept on winning."

The Carnegie Institution at the Cold Spring Harbor had no football team.

== Sources ==
- Berwind Petersen Kaufmann April 23, 1897–September 12, 1975, a Biographical Memoir by Edward B. Lewis for the National Academy of Sciences
