= Berwind, West Virginia =

Berwind
- Census-designated place
- Location within the state of West Virginia
- Coordinates: 37°16′7″N 81°40′0″W
- Country: United States
- State: West Virginia
- County: McDowell

Area
  - Total: 0.301 sq mi (0.78 km^{2})
  - Land: 0.289 sq mi (0.75 km^{2})
  - Water: 0.012 sq mi (0.031 km^{2})

Population (2020)
  - Total: 188
  - Density: 651/sq mi (251/km^{2})
- Time zone: UTC-5 (Eastern (EST))
  - Summer (DST): UTC-4 (EDT)

Berwind is a census-designated place in McDowell County, West Virginia, United States. As of the 2020 census, its population is 188 (down from 278 at the 2010 census). The community is named for Edward Julius Berwind, owner of the Berwind Company, and was originally a company town. It was later incorporated in 1905. Berwind is the hometown of Vern Bickford, a starting pitcher in Major League Baseball who played with the Braves in Boston (1948–1952) and Milwaukee (1953), and for the Baltimore Orioles (1954).

Berwind is on the Norfolk Southern Railway(former Norfolk and Western) network and the Tug Fork river.
