= Allison White =

American politician

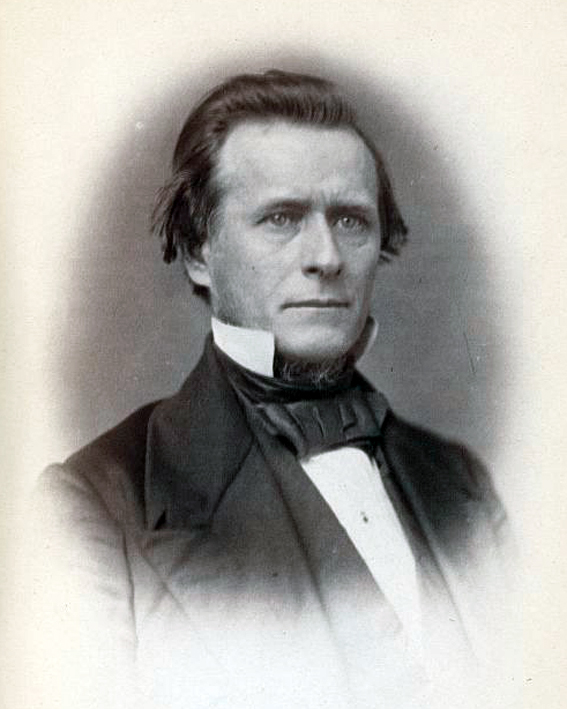

Member of the United States House of Representatives
- In office 1857–1859
- Constituency: Pennsylvania

Personal details
- Born: Allison White; December 21, 1816 Pine Township, Pennsylvania, US
- Died: April 5, 1886 (aged 69) Philadelphia, Pennsylvania, US
- Party: Democratic
- Occupation: Attorney, Politician

Allison White (December 21, 1816 – April 5, 1886) was a Democratic member of the U.S. House of Representatives from Pennsylvania.

== Early life and education ==
White was born in Pine Township, near Jersey Shore, Pennsylvania. He attended the public schools and was graduated from Allegheny College in Meadville, Pennsylvania.

He studied law, was admitted to the bar and commenced practice in Lock Haven, Pennsylvania.

== Congress ==
White was elected as a Democrat to the Thirty-fifth Congress. He served as chairman of the United States House Committee on Expenditures on Public Buildings. He was an unsuccessful candidate for reelection in 1858.

== Later career and death ==
He engaged in the lumber and coal business at Philadelphia, Pennsylvania, eventually forming a partnership with Charles and Edward Julius Berwind that currently exists as the Berwind Corporation.

White died in Philadelphia in 1886. He was interred in Highland Cemetery in Lock Haven.

== Sources ==
- United States Congress. "Allison White (id: W000355)". Biographical Directory of the United States Congress.
- Allison White in The Political Graveyard

U.S. House of Representatives
Preceded by John J. Pearce	Member of the U.S. House of Representatives from Pennsylvania's 15th congressional district 1857–1859	Succeeded by James T. Hale
