= Berwind Corporation =

Coal and investment management former US Shipping Company

- Company type: Privately held
- Industry: Coal and investment management
- Predecessor: Berwind-White Coal Mining Company
- Founded: 1962
- Headquarters: Philadelphia, Pennsylvania, United States
- Key people: Charles Frederick Berwind; Edward Julius Berwind; John E. Berwind; Harry A. Berwind; Allison White; John R. Caldwell
- Website: www.berwind.com

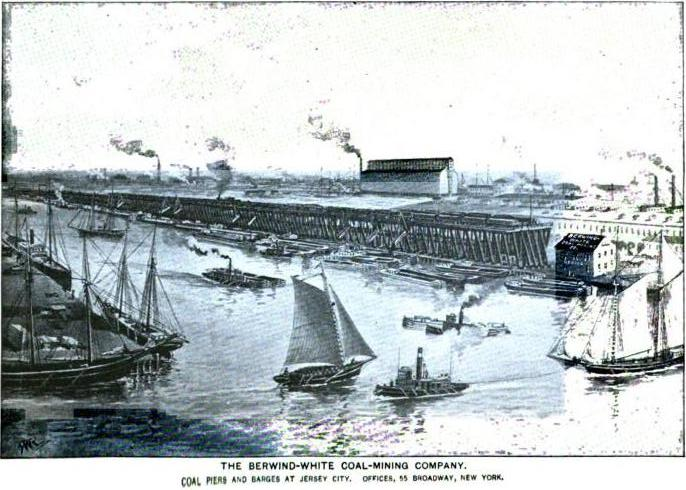
Berwind-White Company coal piers in Jersey City, New Jersey

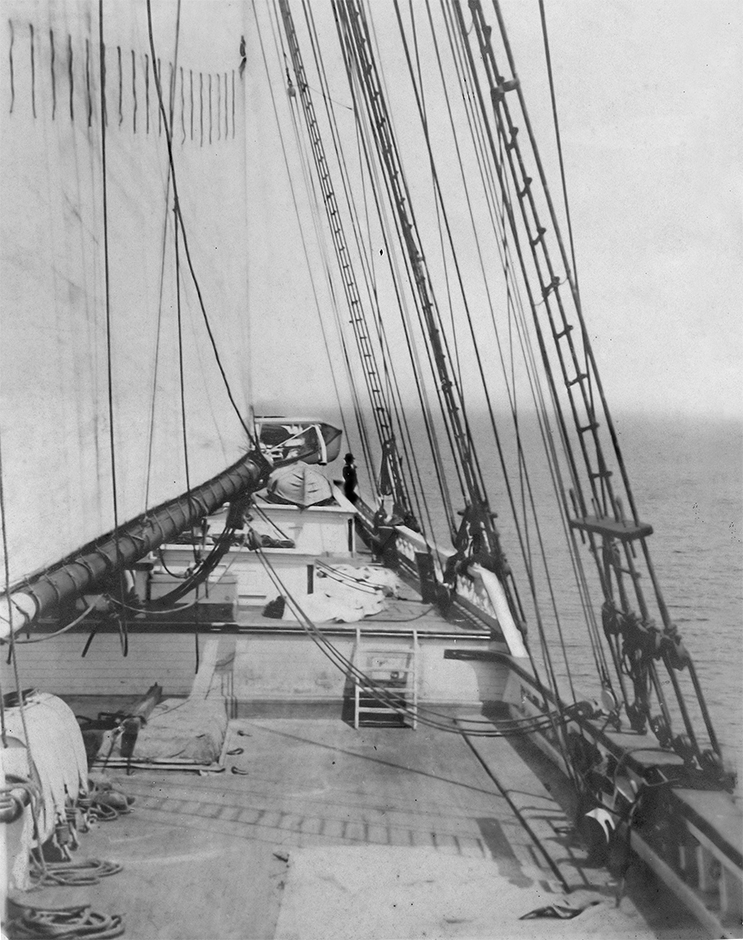
Edward Julius Berwind in 1902

Berwind Corporation, previously also known as Berwind-White Coal Mining Company, is a large privately held American corporation headquartered in Philadelphia, The company has historically been involved in the coal industry, but has diversified into property leasing and ownership of unrelated businesses.

It began as a partnership of Edward Julius Berwind, Charles Frederick Berwind, and Congressman Allison White and upon White's death became known as Berwind White Company in 1886. The company was one of the largest producers of coal at the turn of the twentieth century and created several towns in West Virginia and Pennsylvania, including Windber, Pennsylvania and Berwind, West Virginia. It was a litigant in two U.S. Supreme Court decisions: Berwind-White Coal Mining Co. v. Chicago & Erie R. Co., 235 U.S. 371 (1914) and McGoldrick v. Berwind-White Coal Mining Co., 309 U.S. 33 (1940). In 1962 the family corporation moved from directly producing coal to leasing its properties and diversification into ownership of other businesses, including Protective Industries (including Caplugs and Mokon) and, CRC Industries.

By 2007, the company's investments in real estate alone totaled over $3 billion. Berwinds founded the Wilmore Steamship Company in 1930.

== Companies ==
Berwind Corporations companies:

- Colorcon, pharmaceutical
- CRC Industries, chemical
- Maxcess, automation systems
- Oliver, Healthcare packaging
- Caplugs, plastic molding
- TASI Group, test and measurement
- Berwind Natural Resources Corporation (BNRC), land and resource management company

== See also ==
- World War II United States Merchant Navy
