= Windber, Pennsylvania =

Borough in Pennsylvania, US

- Borough
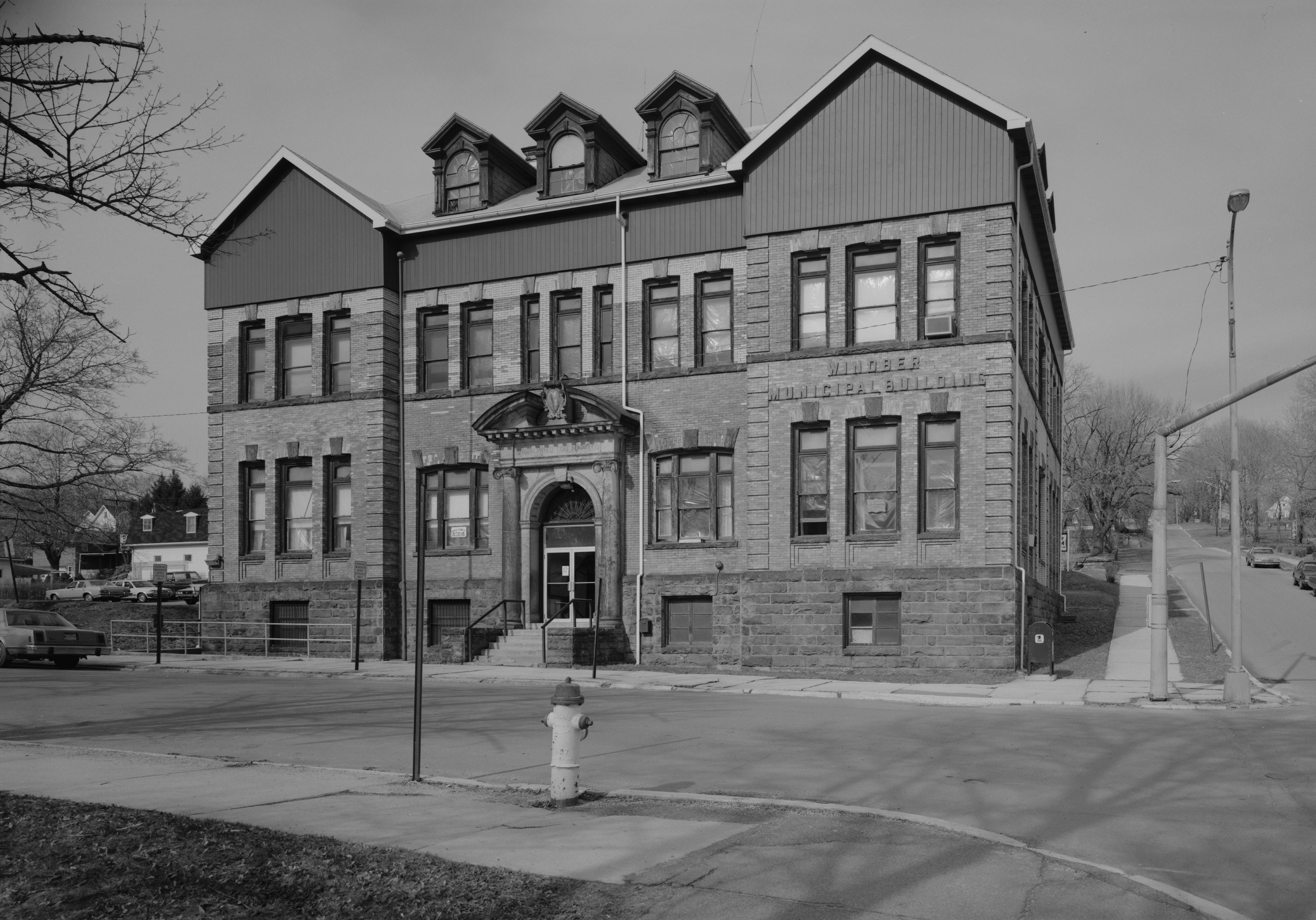
- Municipal building

- Location of Windber in Somerset County, Pennsylvania.
- Coordinates: 40°14′07″N 78°49′51″W
- Country: United States
- State: Pennsylvania
- County: Somerset
- Settled: 1897
- Incorporated: July 3, 1900

Government
  - Type: Borough Council
  - Mayor: Mike Thomas

Area
  - Total: 1.98 sq mi (5.12 km^{2})
  - Land: 1.98 sq mi (5.12 km^{2})
  - Water: 0 sq mi (0.00 km^{2})

Population (2020)
  - Total: 3,930 ▼
  - Estimate (2021): 3,893
  - Density: 1,929.6/sq mi (745.01/km^{2})
- Time zone: UTC-5 (Eastern (EST))
  - Summer (DST): UTC-4 (EDT)
- ZIP Code: 15963
- Area code: 814
- FIPS code: 42-85632
- Website: Windber Borough

Windber is a borough in Somerset County, Pennsylvania, United States, which is located approximately three miles (4.8 km) south of Johnstown. The population was 3,930 at the 2020 census. A former manufacturing town, Windber is part of the Johnstown, Pennsylvania Metropolitan Statistical Area.

== History ==
Windber was established in 1897 as a company town for nearby coal mines in the vicinity of Johnstown. The establishment was overseen by coal barons Charles and Edward Julius Berwind, owners of the Berwind Corporation; the name "Windber" simply switches the order of the two syllables in the family name "Berwind". The Berwind-White Coal Mining Company imported workers from eastern and southern Europe and exploited ethnic divisions in the area (which had been settled by Germans and Irish in the 19th century).

On Good Friday 1922 during the UMW General coal strike, coal miners walked out of the mines in Windber and several nearby locations in Somerset County, attempting to force the mine owners to recognize their United Mine Workers union, as well as accurately weigh the coal they mined.

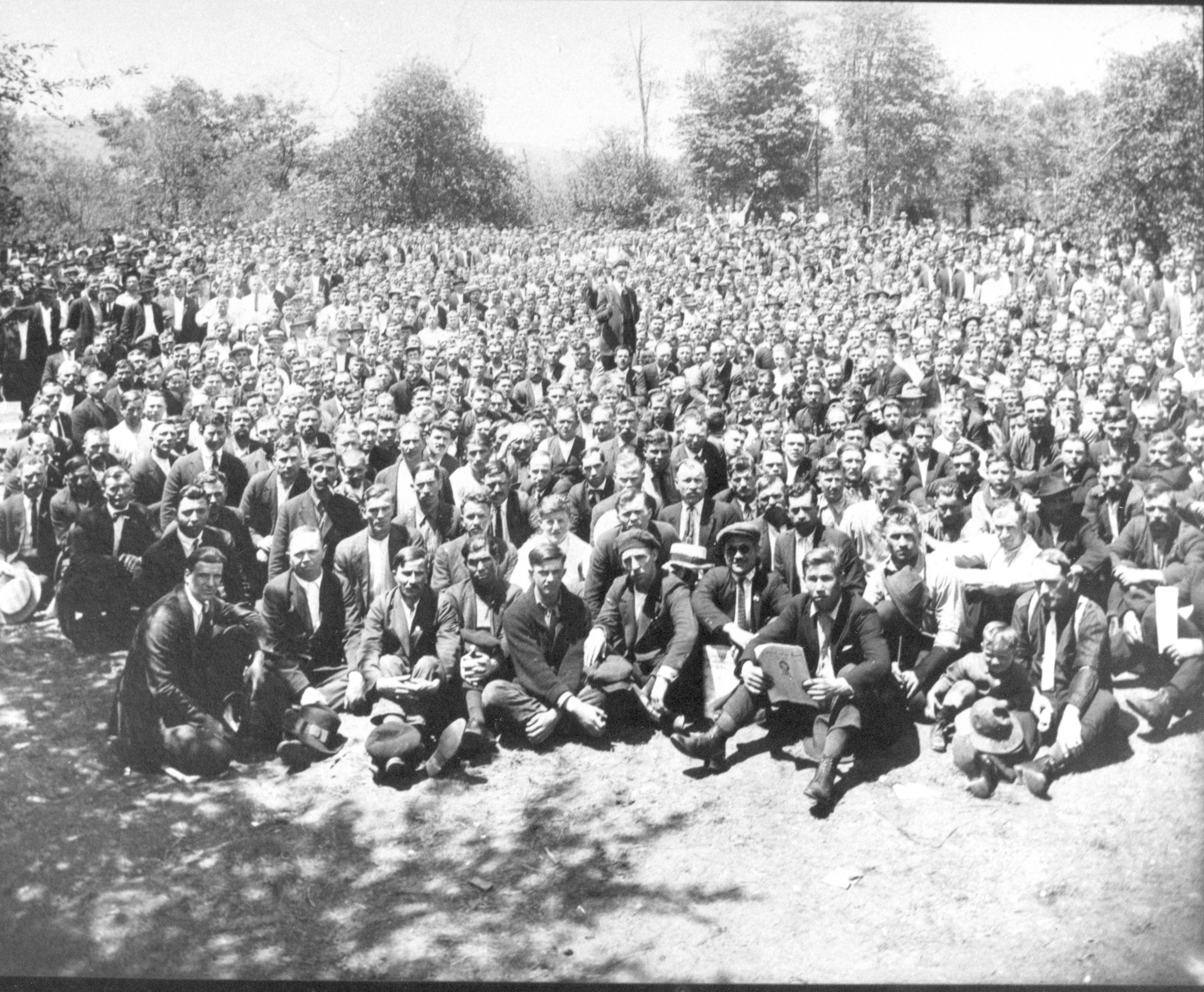
Mass meeting of more than 3,000 striking coal miners held near Windber, PA in September 1922

The company employed legal tactics (the United States Supreme Court decided two lawsuits) as well as strike-breakers, but the miners received considerable favorable national publicity and local support and held out until the end of the following summer. However, the UMW successfully organized the mines during 1933, after the Great Depression led to the election of President Franklin Delano Roosevelt.

The Vintage Electric Streetcar Company, popularly called the "trolley graveyard", is located in Windber. The private scrapyard houses a number of PCC streetcars and other transit equipment from systems like the MBTA Green Line, which are sold for reuse or scrapped for parts.

The Windber Historic District was listed on the National Register of Historic Places in 1991.

== Geography ==
Windber is located at 40°14′7″N 78°49′51″W (40.235161, -78.830864).

According to the United States Census Bureau, the borough has a total area of 2.1 square miles (5.4 km^{2}), all land.

== Demographics ==
Historical population
Census	Pop.	Note	%±
1910	8,013		—
1920	9,462		18.1%
1930	9,205		−2.7%
1940	9,057		−1.6%
1950	8,010		−11.6%
1960	6,994		−12.7%
1970	6,332		−9.5%
1980	5,585		−11.8%
1990	4,756		−14.8%
2000	4,395		−7.6%
2010	4,138		−5.8%
2020	3,941		−4.8%
2021 (est.)	3,893	▼	−1.2%

=== 2020 census ===
As of the 2020 census, Windber had a population of 3,941. The median age was 42.7 years. 21.7% of residents were under the age of 18 and 21.3% of residents were 65 years of age or older. For every 100 females there were 92.5 males, and for every 100 females age 18 and over there were 88.5 males age 18 and over.

100.0% of residents lived in urban areas, while 0.0% lived in rural areas.

There were 1,808 households in Windber, of which 26.1% had children under the age of 18 living in them. Of all households, 38.3% were married-couple households, 20.9% were households with a male householder and no spouse or partner present, and 32.6% were households with a female householder and no spouse or partner present. About 36.2% of all households were made up of individuals and 18.3% had someone living alone who was 65 years of age or older.

There were 2,062 housing units, of which 12.3% were vacant. The homeowner vacancy rate was 1.3% and the rental vacancy rate was 9.9%.

Racial composition as of the 2020 census
Race	Number	Percent
White	3,695	93.8%
Black or African American	26	0.7%
American Indian and Alaska Native	8	0.2%
Asian	8	0.2%
Native Hawaiian and Other Pacific Islander	0	0.0%
Some other race	3	0.1%
Two or more races	201	5.1%
Hispanic or Latino (of any race)	68	1.7%

=== 2000 census ===
As of the census of 2000, there were 4,395 people, 2,019 households, and 1,185 families residing in the borough.

The population density was 2,118.8 people per square mile (818.1 people/km^{2}). There were 2,177 housing units at an average density of 1,049.5 per square mile (405.2/km^{2}).

The racial makeup of the borough was 99.29% White, 0.07% Native American, 0.09% Asian, 0.02% Pacific Islander, 0.16% from other races, and 0.36% from two or more races. Hispanic or Latino of any race were 0.57% of the population.

There were 2,019 households, out of which 25.1% had children under the age of eighteen living with them; 43.3% were married couples living together, 10.8% had a female householder with no husband present, and 41.3% were non-families. 38.7% of all households were made up of individuals, and 22.6% had someone living alone who was sixty-five years of age or older.

The average household size was 2.16 and the average family size was 2.89.

In the borough the population was spread out, with 21.3% under the age of eighteen, 6.7% from eighteen to twenty-four, 25.3% from twenty-five to forty-four, 22.1% from forty-five to sixty-four, and 24.6% who were sixty-five years of age or older. The median age was forty-three years.

For every one hundred females, there were 85.4 males. For every one hundred females who were aged eighteen or older, there were 81.9 males.

The median income for a household in the borough was $23,261, and the median income for a family was $31,860. Males had a median income of $24,861 compared with that of $18,886 for females.

The per capita income for the borough was $15,078.

Roughly 11.9% of families and 11.1% of the population were living below the poverty line, including 13.5% of those who were under the age of eighteen and 8.8% of those who were aged sixty-five or older.

== Education ==
Windber is served by the Windber Area School District.

== Entertainment ==
The nearby Silver Drive-In first opened in 1962. While other such facilities in the area have closed over the course of years, the Silver survived through public outcry over proposals to close and demolish it, making a comeback in 2005. It is now the only drive-in theater in the Johnstown, Pennsylvania region.

== Notable people ==
- Bo Bassett, wrestler
- Jim Bonfanti, drummer for the Raspberries
- John A. Chapman, final resting place, Medal of Honor
- Bill Elko, professional football player, nephew of Frank Kush
- Alan Freed, radio disc jockey who coined the term "Rock and Roll"
- Dave Geisel, retired MLB player
- Mark A. Heckler, President of Valparaiso University
- Terry Heckler, inventor of the Starbucks logo. His branding companies have gone on to brand many well known businesses.
- Gene Heeter, professional football player
- Rebekah Jones, geographer, data scientist, and activist
- Frank Kostro, retired MLB player
- Frank Kush, football coach
- Braxton Roxby, MLB player
- Johnny Weissmuller, Olympic swimmer and Hollywood star
- J. Irving Whalley, United States congressman

== See also ==
- List of boroughs in Pennsylvania
- List of geographic names derived from anagrams and ananyms
