= Rovensky =

Rovensky (Russian: Ровенский or Ровеньский), Rovenskaya (Ровенская/Ровеньская), or Rovenskoye (Ровенское/Ровеньское) may refer to:

- Rovensky (surname)
- Rovensky District, name of several districts in Russia
- Rovensky (rural locality) (Rovenskaya, Rovenskoye), name of several rural localities in Russia
- Rovensky Park, a historic park in Newport, Rhode Island, United States
