= Bellevue Avenue Historic District =

Historic district in Newport, Rhode Island

- U.S. National Register of Historic Places
- U.S. National Historic Landmark District
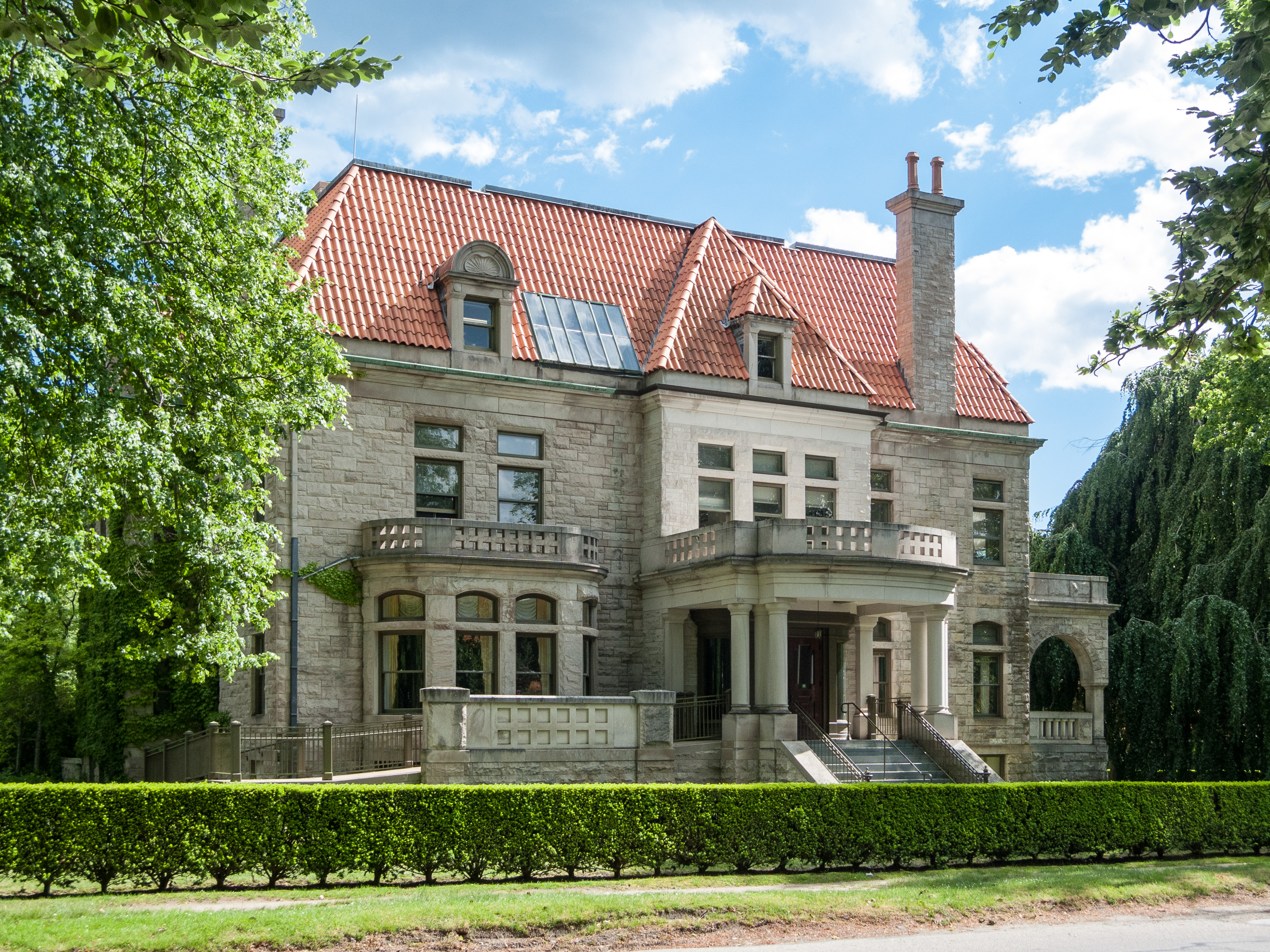
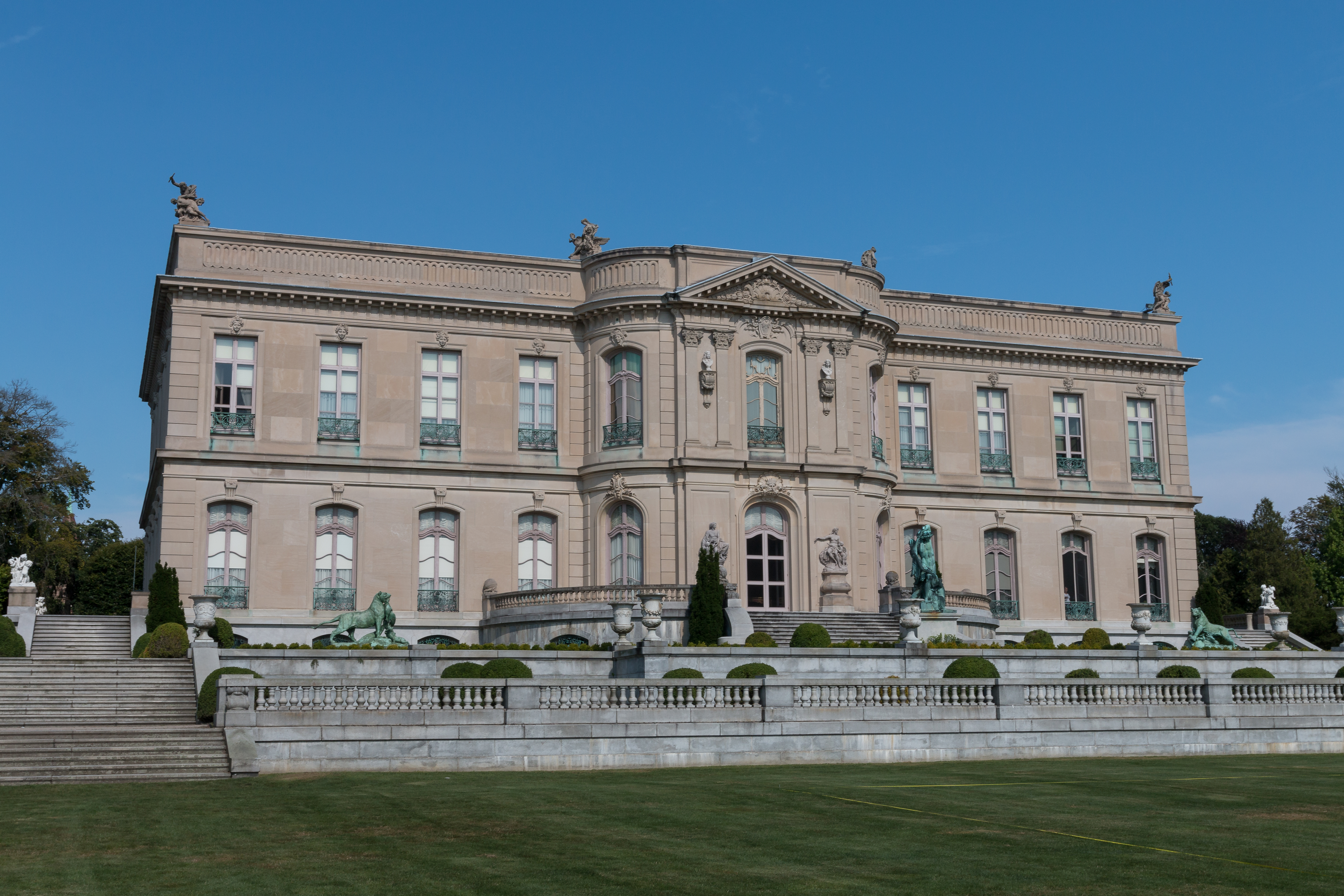
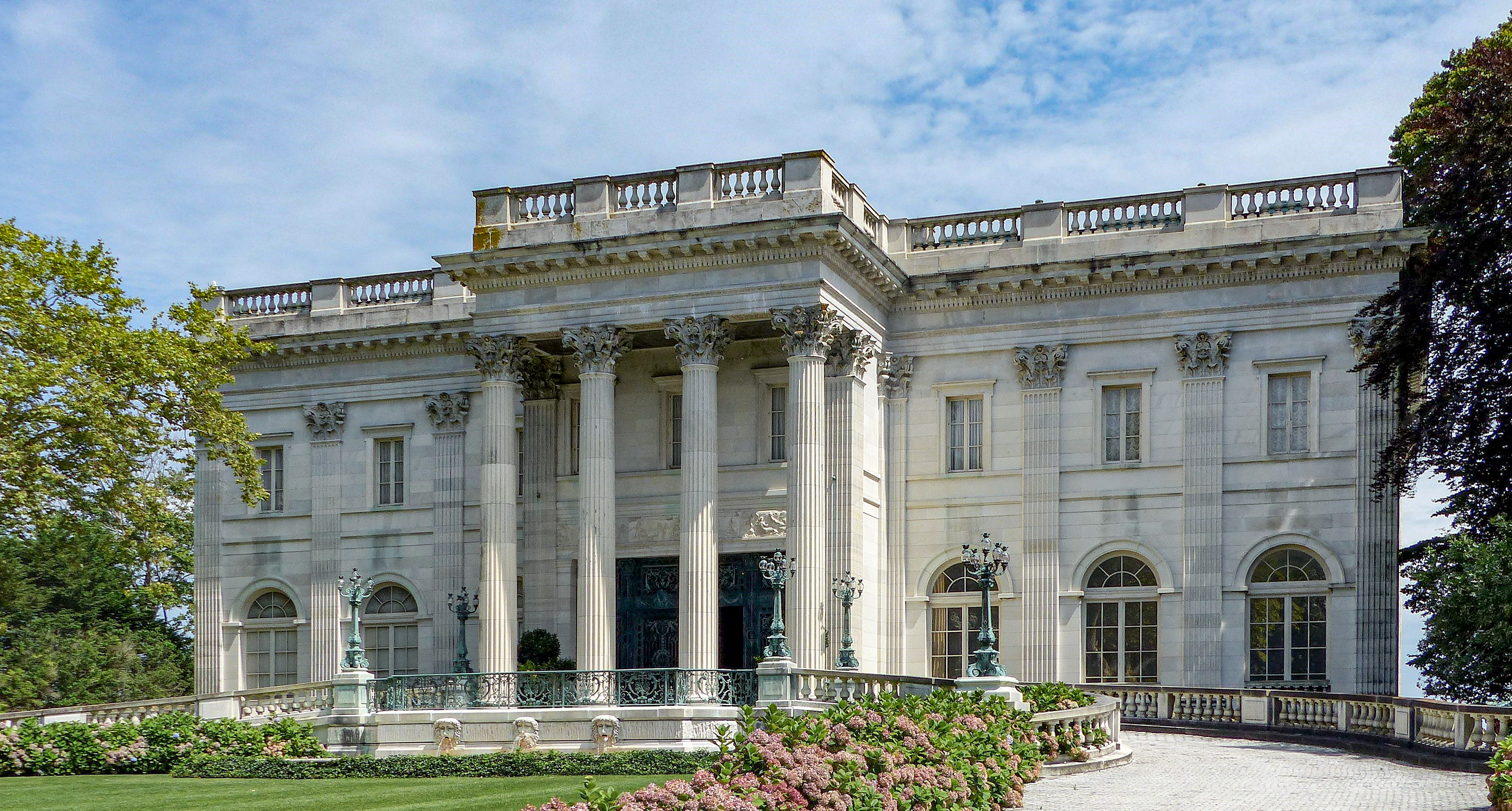
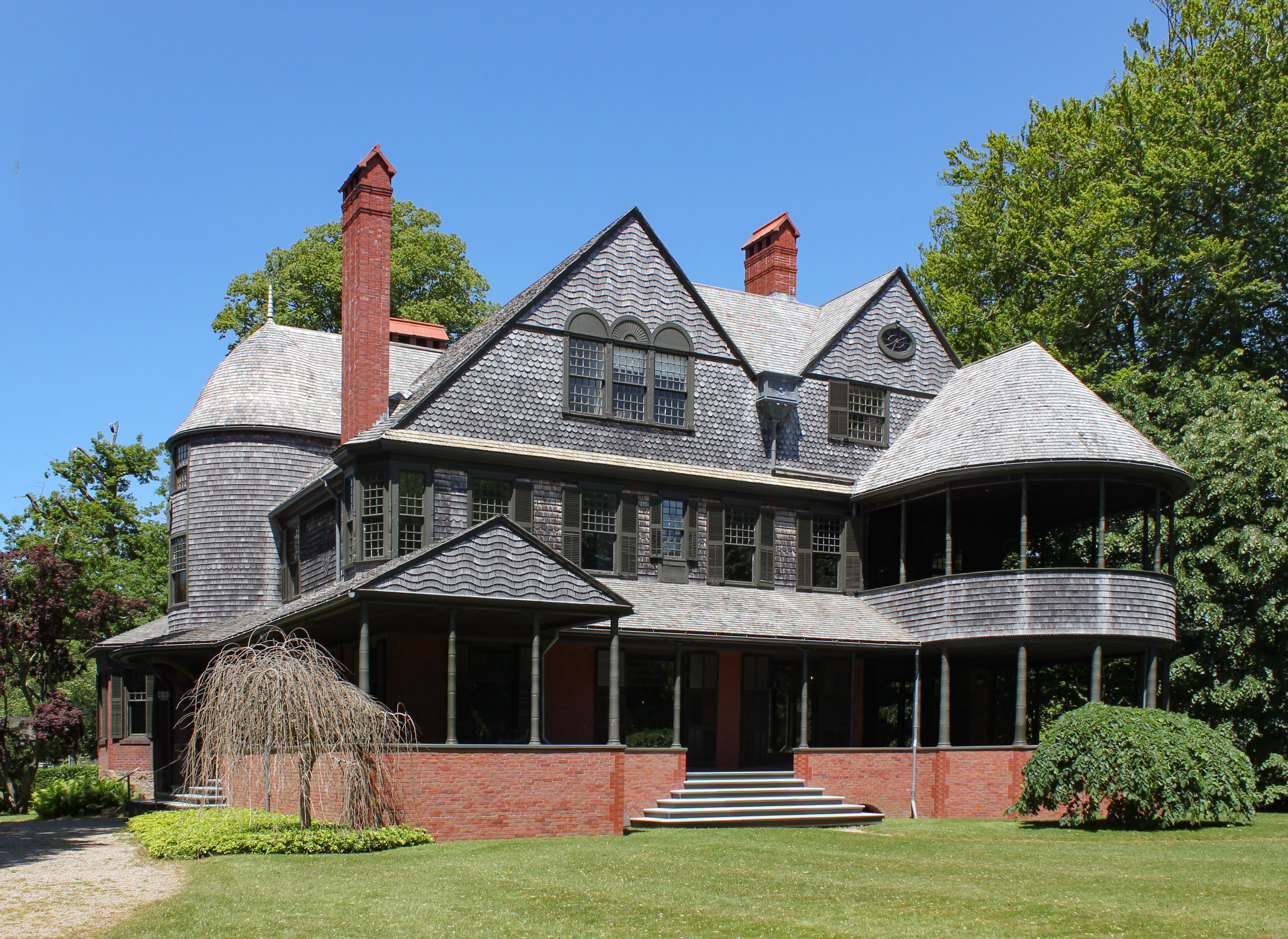
- Major contributing properties

- Location within Rhode Island Location within the United States
- Location: Newport, RI
- Coordinates: 41°28′13″N 71°18′26″W
- Area: 606 acres (245 ha)
- Architect: Multiple
- Architectural style: Late Victorian, Mixed (more than two styles from different periods)
- NRHP reference No.: 72000023

Significant dates
- Added to NRHP: December 8, 1972
- Designated NHLD: May 11, 1976

The Bellevue Avenue Historic District is located along and around Bellevue Avenue in Newport, Rhode Island, United States. Its property is almost exclusively residential, including many of the Gilded Age mansions built as summer retreats around the turn of the 20th century by the extremely wealthy, including the Vanderbilt and Astor families. Many of the homes represent pioneering work in the architectural styles of the time by major American architects.

The district was declared a National Historic Landmark (NHL) in 1976. Several of the mansions within the district are also individually National Historic Landmarks, and a number of them are open to the public as museums. The district has become one of Newport's major tourist attractions.

== Geography ==
The district encompasses an area of 606 acres (245 ha) bounded by Block Island Sound and Narragansett Bay to the south and east, respectively, Spring Street and Coggeshall Avenue to the west, and Memorial Boulevard to the north. This takes in the southeastern quarter of the developed portions of the city on the southwestern neck of Aquidneck Island. Bellevue Avenue itself runs north–south for over two miles (3.2 km) through the middle of the district.

Land use within the district is overwhelmingly residential. Most of its 63 buildings are dwellings either in use or originally built for that purpose. Institutional use is the next most common, with many of the historic mansions now used as historic house museums. One, Vernon Court, is home of the National Museum of American Illustration. Another, Belcourt Castle, is a privately owned house museum. Many others are owned by the Preservation Society of Newport County. Salve Regina University, home to some more historic buildings, including the William Watts Sherman House, is wholly within the district, and there is also a more modern senior citizens home built in the mid-20th century.

Commercial properties are clustered near the Newport Casino at the north end of the district, such as two contemporary strip malls opposite and to the right (respectively) of the casino itself. There are some small parks within the district, the block just south of Vernon Court on the east side of Bellevue is the location of the Frederick Law Olmsted Arboretum, located on the site of Stoneacre, no longer extant. The grounds of Stoneacre were designed by Frederick Law Olmsted. Rovensky Park is further down Bellevue Avenue and is maintained by the Preservation Society of Newport County. Many of the larger mansions sit on large lots, leaving plenty of open space within the district.

== History ==
During the colonial era and the decades after independence, most of Newport's development remained around its downtown area, where port facilities, the mainstay of the city's economy, were located. Early in the 19th century, visitors to the city in the summer months came to appreciate the moderating effects of the sea breezes and the panoramic ocean views. They began building cottages along the higher ground where Bellevue Avenue, then a lightly traveled farm path, now runs.

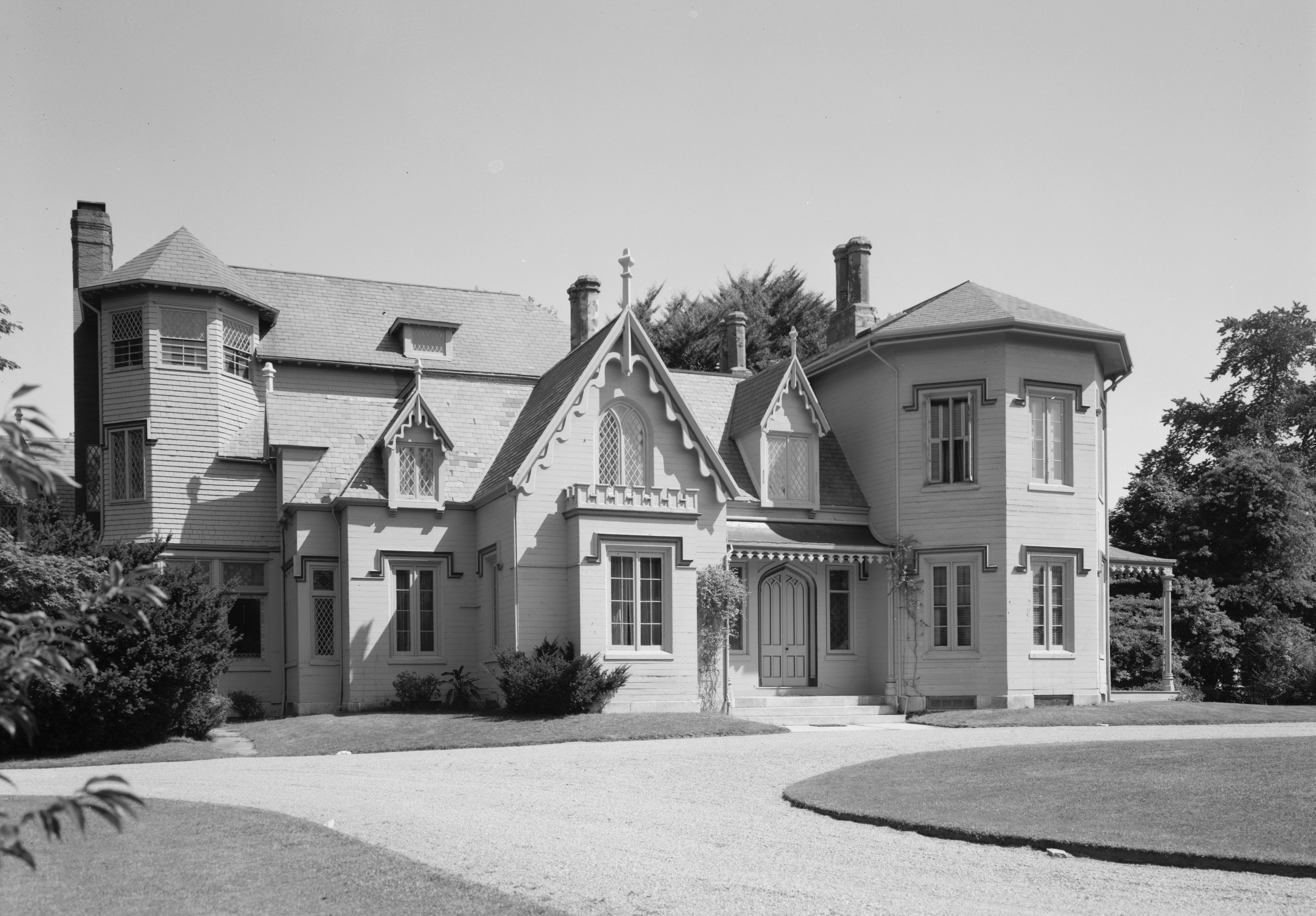
Kingscote, the first Newport summer mansion

In 1839, George Noble Jones, a Southern plantation owner, built Kingscote, a Carpenter Gothic building considered the first of the city's mansions. The Civil War and the years leading up to it slowed further development in the area, but then it picked up again during the economic prosperity of the Gilded Age in the later decades of the 19th century. Houses became slightly larger than the original cottages, and experimented with new architectural styles. Chateau-sur-Mer was one of the few built as a year-round residence in 1851, it was later expanded in the 1880s using the Second Empire architecture from France. The Casino and the Isaac Bell House inaugurated the Shingle style, where that material was used as siding instead of clapboard.

More and more wealthy families were drawn to Newport in the summers, transforming the architecture again. William Kissam Vanderbilt's Marble House in 1888 helped spark the transformation of Newport with stone as a building material, Beaux Arts as a style, and set a new standard for size. A few years later, his brother Cornelius spent a record $7 million (equivalent to $271 million in 2025) on The Breakers, sitting above the cliffs at Ochre Point on the eastern shore. The Astors expanded the 1856 Beechwood to suit their needs.

These houses and their occupants made Newport synonymous with wealth and leisure in the early 20th century. Tennis and sailing would become associated with the city and the district through the tennis courts in the Casino, which hosted the early tournaments that became the US Open, and the America's Cup races which began being held in the nearby waters every three years. The onset of the Depression began to change this, as some families, faced with dwindling fortunes, turned their houses over to the public or private nonprofits such as the Preservation Society of Newport County.

As the trend toward tourism continued in the years after World War II, the mansions began being converted into museums and opened to the public; the International Tennis Hall of Fame opened in the Casino in 1955. The 1962 sale of The Elms, the last of the mansions to be owned and operated by the original family, marked the end of the resort era.

Preservation efforts had been going on in the downtown historic district for years, and the city had begun to appreciate their value as tourist attractions. In 1965, it recognized as part of its original local historic district three smaller areas in the Bellevue area, later added to the National Register of Historic Places: the original Bellevue Avenue district along the residential portions of the street itself, the Ochre Point/Cliffs district around The Breakers and the Bellevue Avenue/Casino District in that area.

In 1972 the city applied to the National Park Service to combine all three and expand them into the current Bellevue Avenue district. Four years later the new district was recognized as a National Historic Landmark District, the second of three in the city. The mansions and museums continue to be a draw for visitors to the city today.

== Significant contributing properties ==
The builders of the mansions had the means to employ the best architectural talent available to them at the highest level of creativity. "The list of architects", says NPS historian Carolyn Pitts,"embraces almost every major designer of that time and what emerges at Newport is also a study of the development of the taste and skill of men like Richard Upjohn, Richard Morris Hunt and McKim, Mead and White over their professional careers."

Eight of the district's buildings have been designated as National Historic Landmarks in their own right. Several others are listed on the National Register of Historic Places. Many are open to the public for guided tours.

=== National Historic Landmarks ===
- Isaac Bell House: First Shingle Style house.
- The Breakers: Costly Italian Renaissance-style Vanderbilt home is Newport's signature mansion and a symbol of the Gilded Age.
- Chateau-sur-Mer: Originally built in 1851, later extensively remodeled in Second Empire and other late 19th century styles by Richard Morris Hunt. Considered the first of the great Newport mansions.
- The Elms: Horace Trumbauer mansion for coal magnate Edward Julius Berwind was one of the first houses wired for electricity. Classical Revival style imitates Château d'Asnières in France.
- Kingscote: Gothic Revival 1839 cottage by Richard Upjohn is the first large house in the city built for a summer resident.
- Marble House: Hunt's Beaux Arts design for William Kissam Vanderbilt was one of the first stone mansions, and started a trend toward very large homes in Newport.
- Newport Casino: The only non-residential NHL within the district, it was its first Shingle Style building and one of the first American social clubs to include recreational facilities.
- William Watts Sherman House: Henry Hobson Richardson house, with interiors by Stanford White, considered one of his best works. Prototype for the Shingle Style.
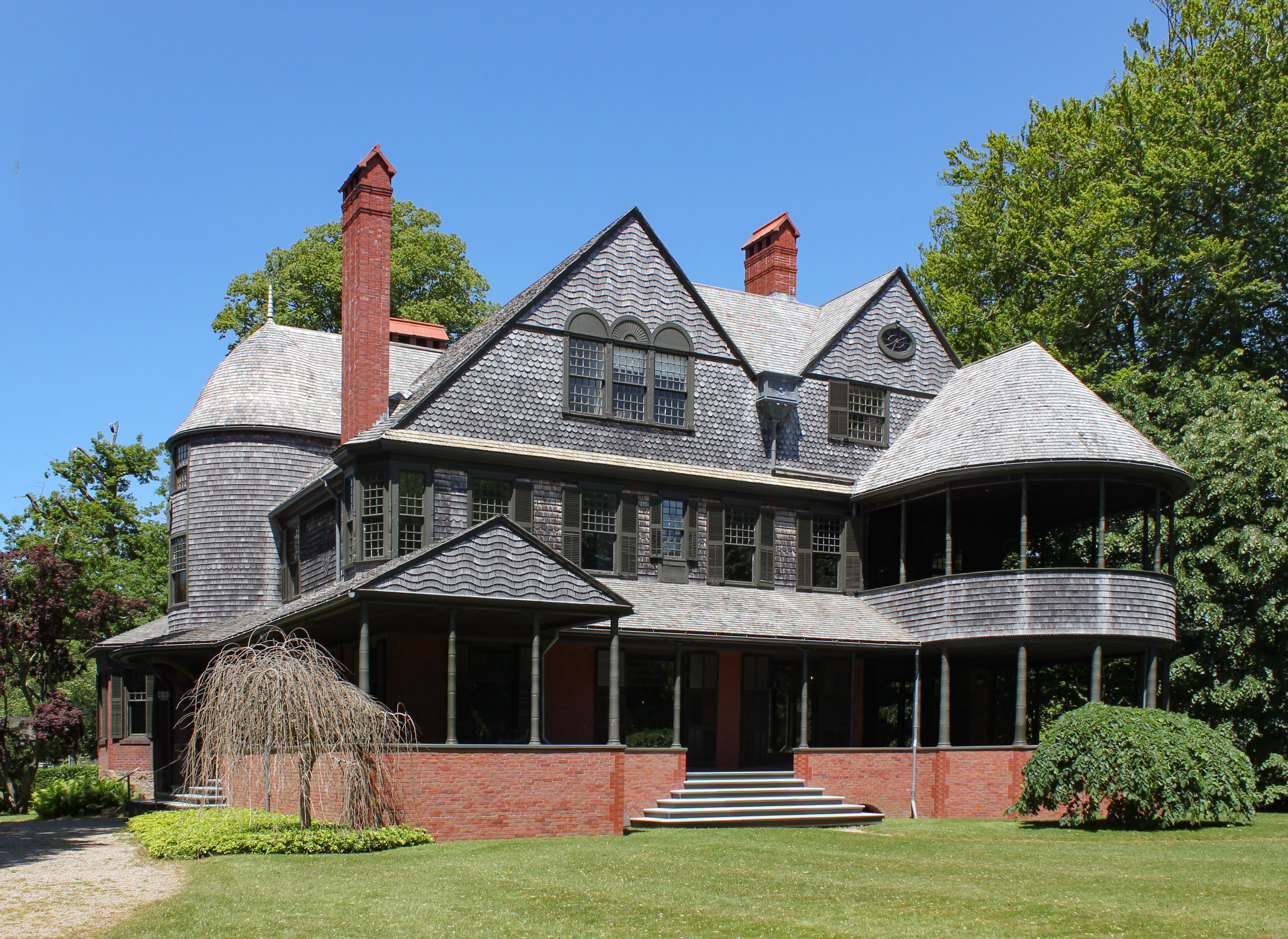
  Isaac Bell House
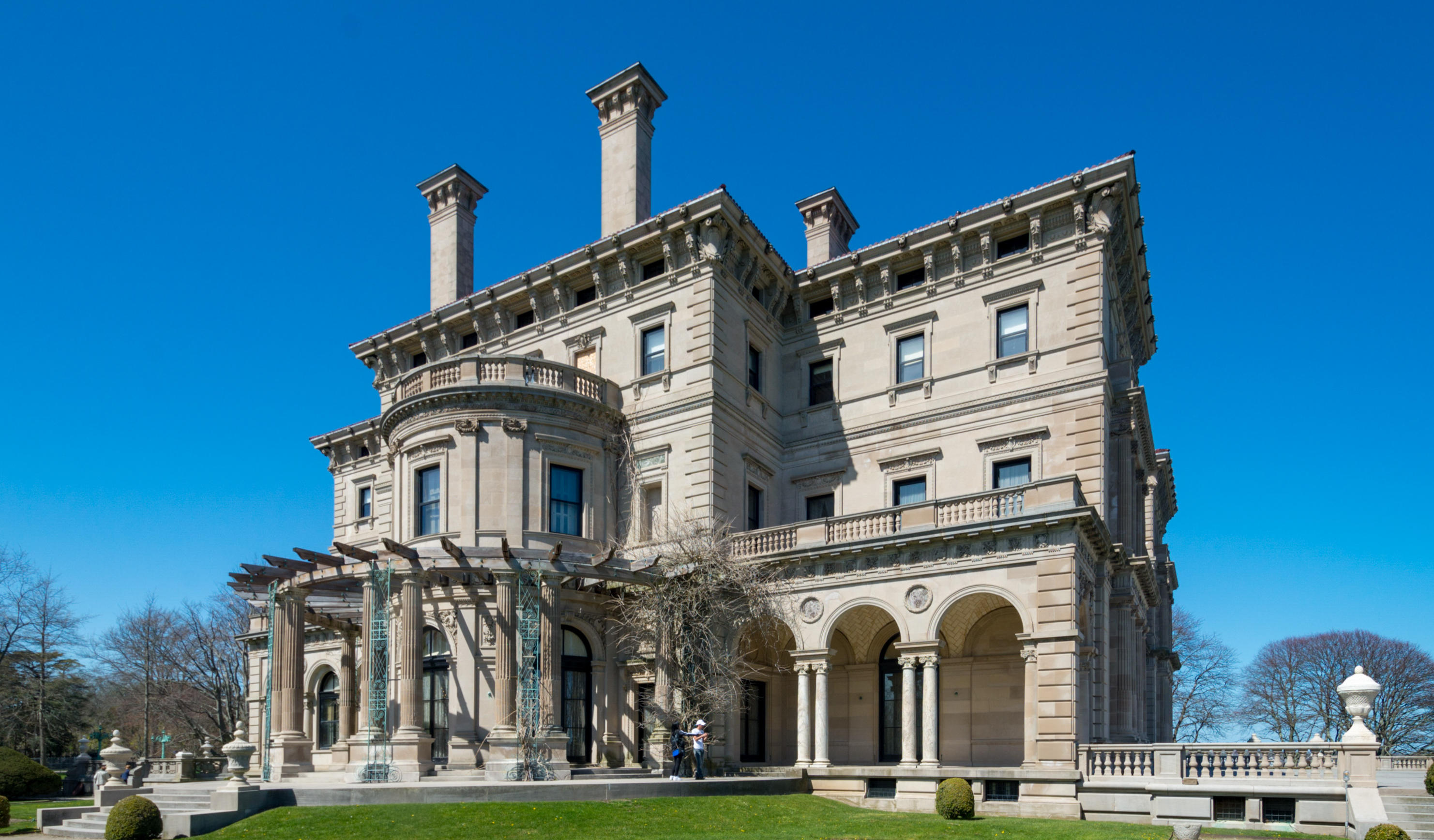
  The Breakers
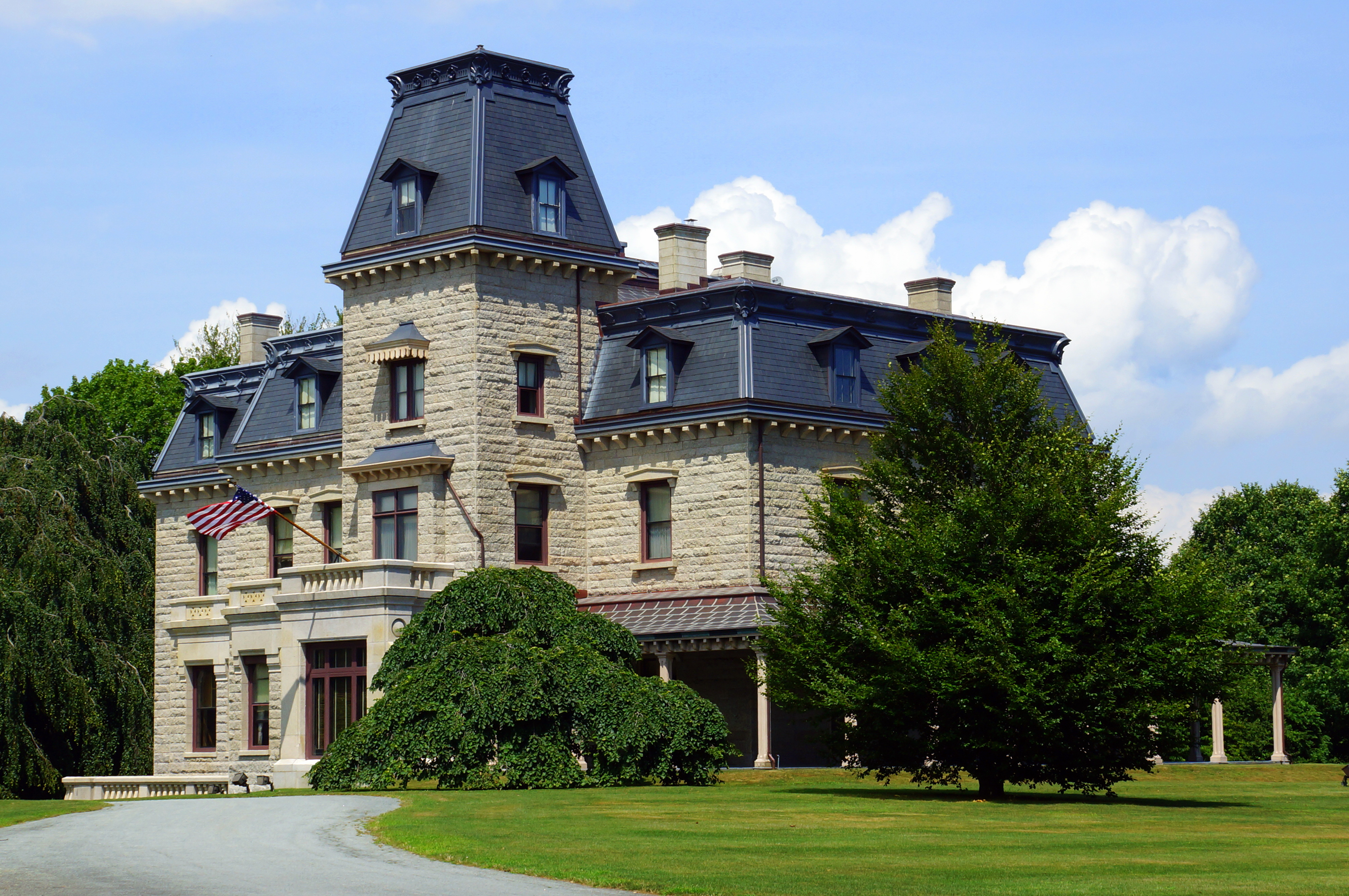
  Chateau-sur-Mer
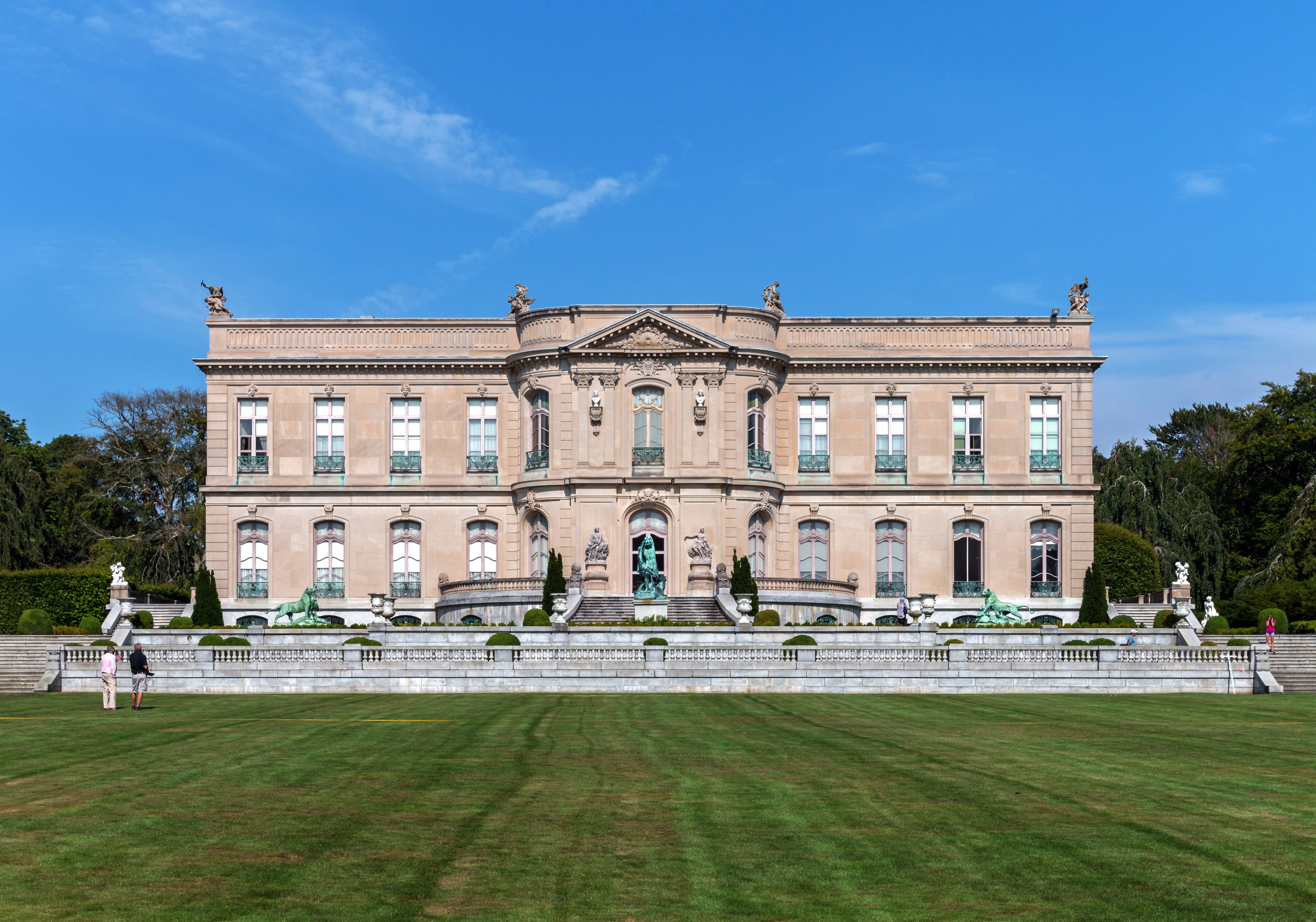
  The Elms
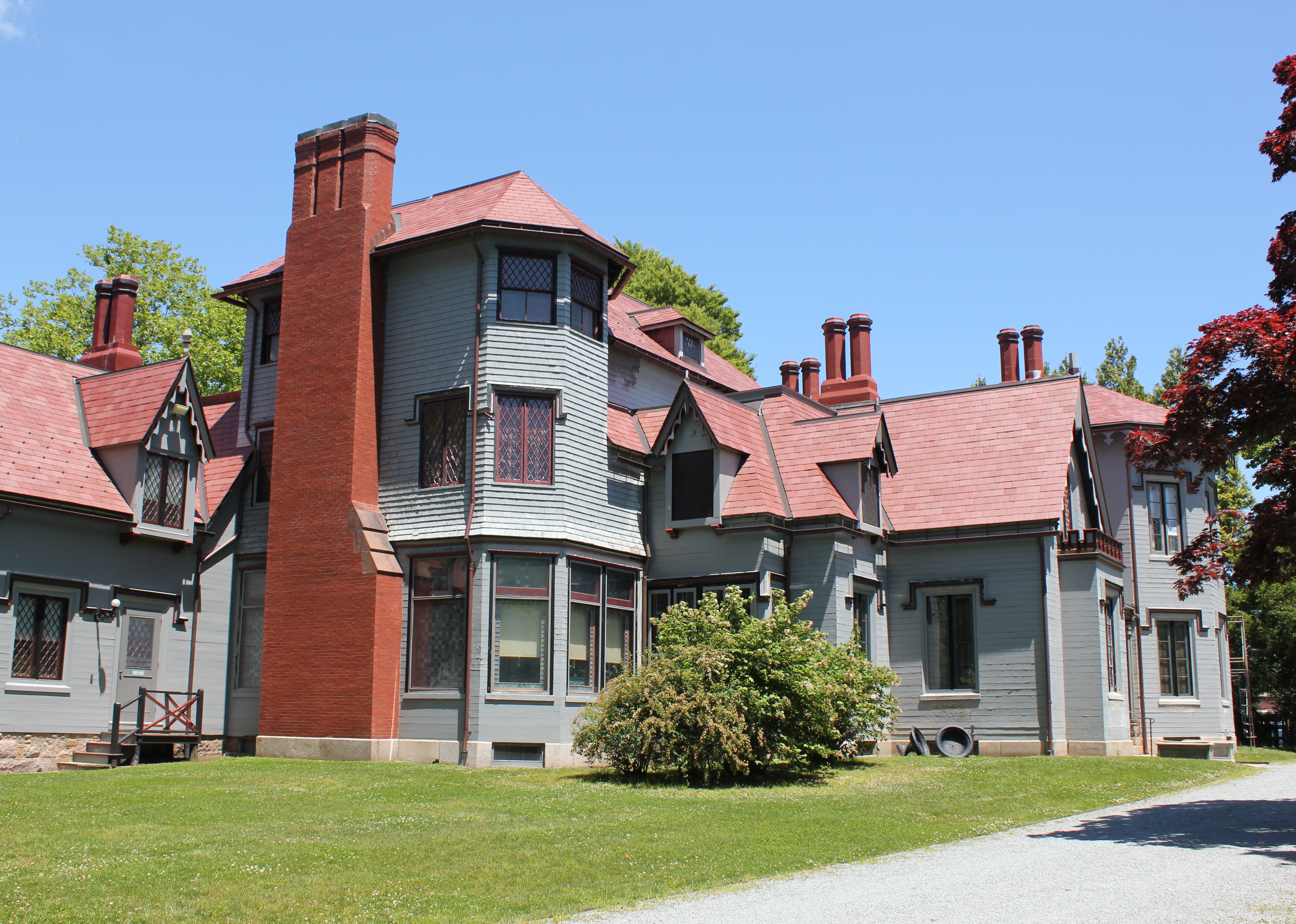
  Kingscote
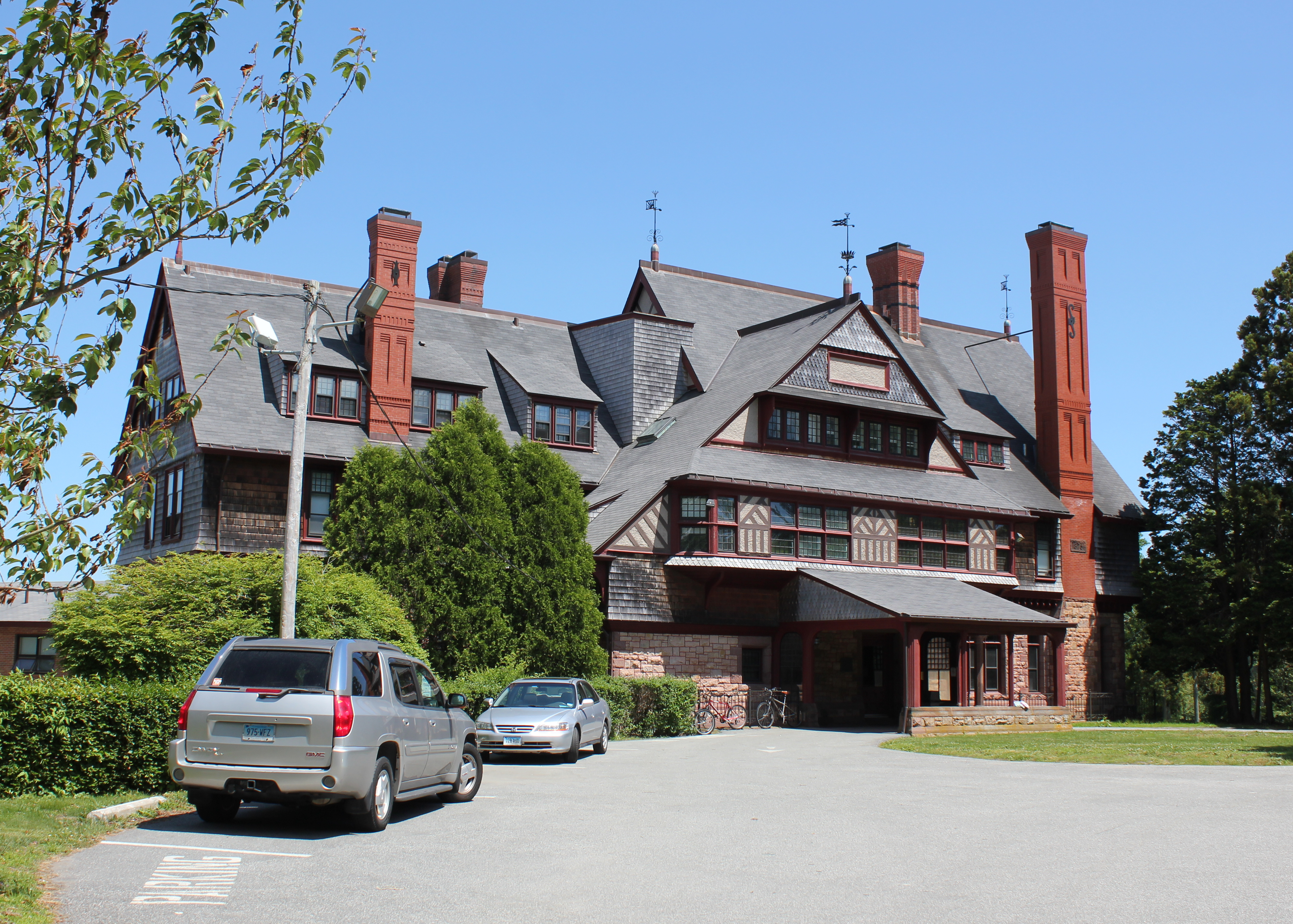
  The William Watts Sherman House
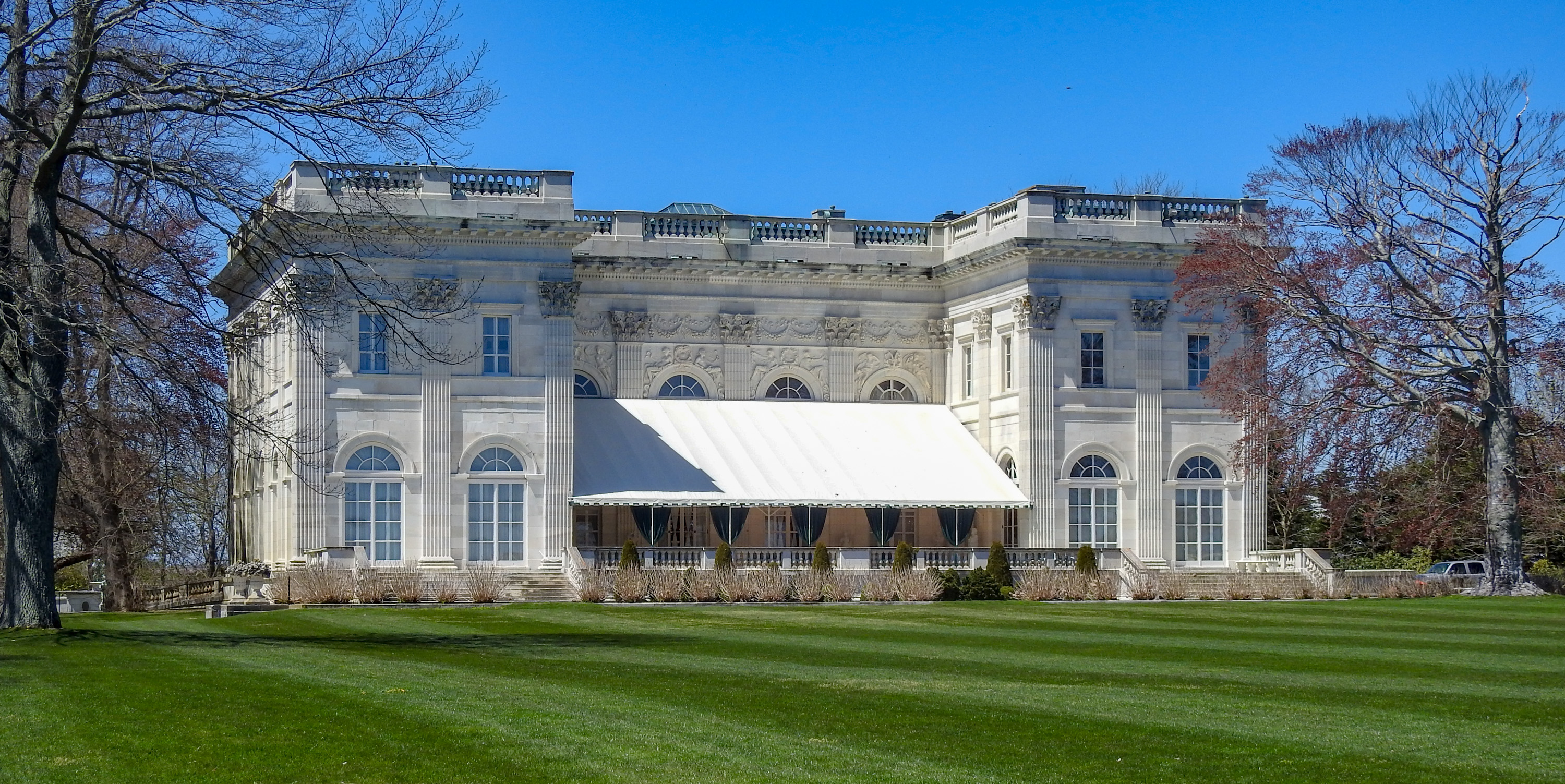
  Marble House
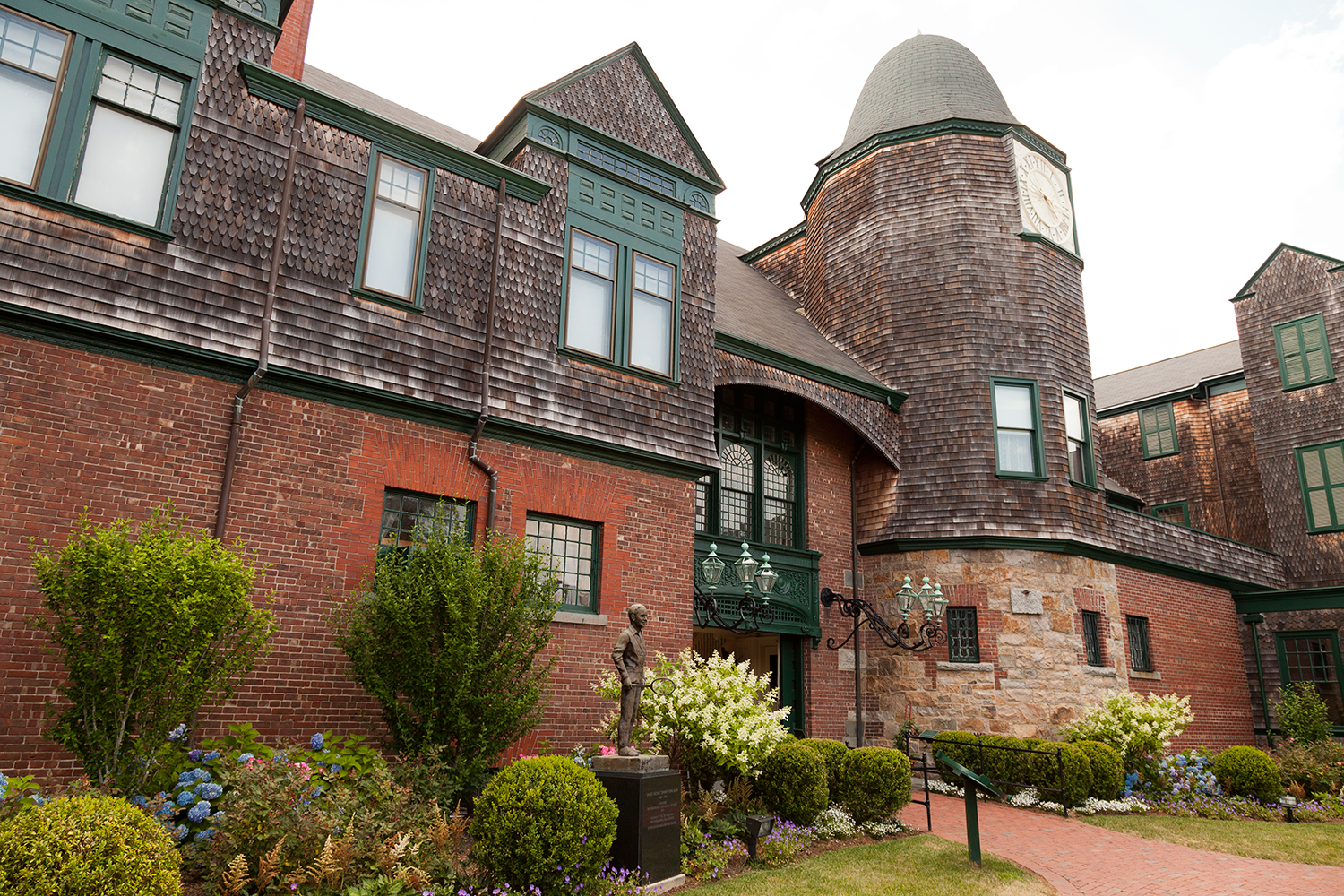
  Newport Casino

=== Other major properties ===
- Beechwood: The Astors' Newport home, remodeled from an older one. Formerly living museum with actors playing the family, its guests and staff for visitors, now privately owned and closed to the public.
- Belcourt of Newport: Summer home of Oliver Hazard Perry Belmont, built by Hunt in a variety of different styles of the time.
- Rosecliff: Stanford White's imitation of Versailles' Grand Trianon, built for silver heiress Theresa Fair Oelrichs.
- Ochre Court: Châteauesque mansion by Richard Morris Hunt. One of a number of properties also within the Ochre Point–Cliffs Historic District.
- Vernon Court: Imitation of a Germain Boffrand chateau. Today home to the National Museum of American Illustration.
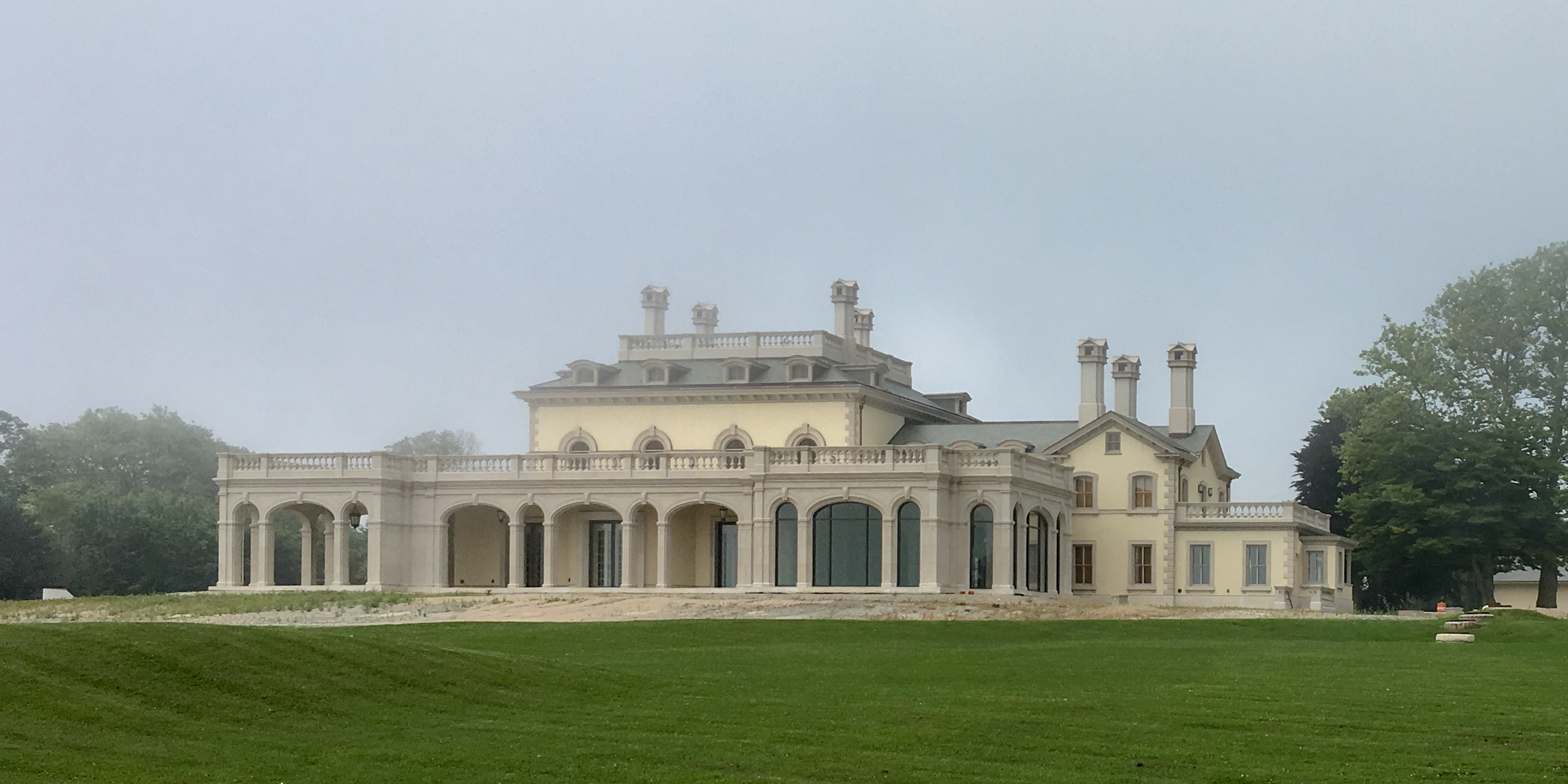
Beechwood

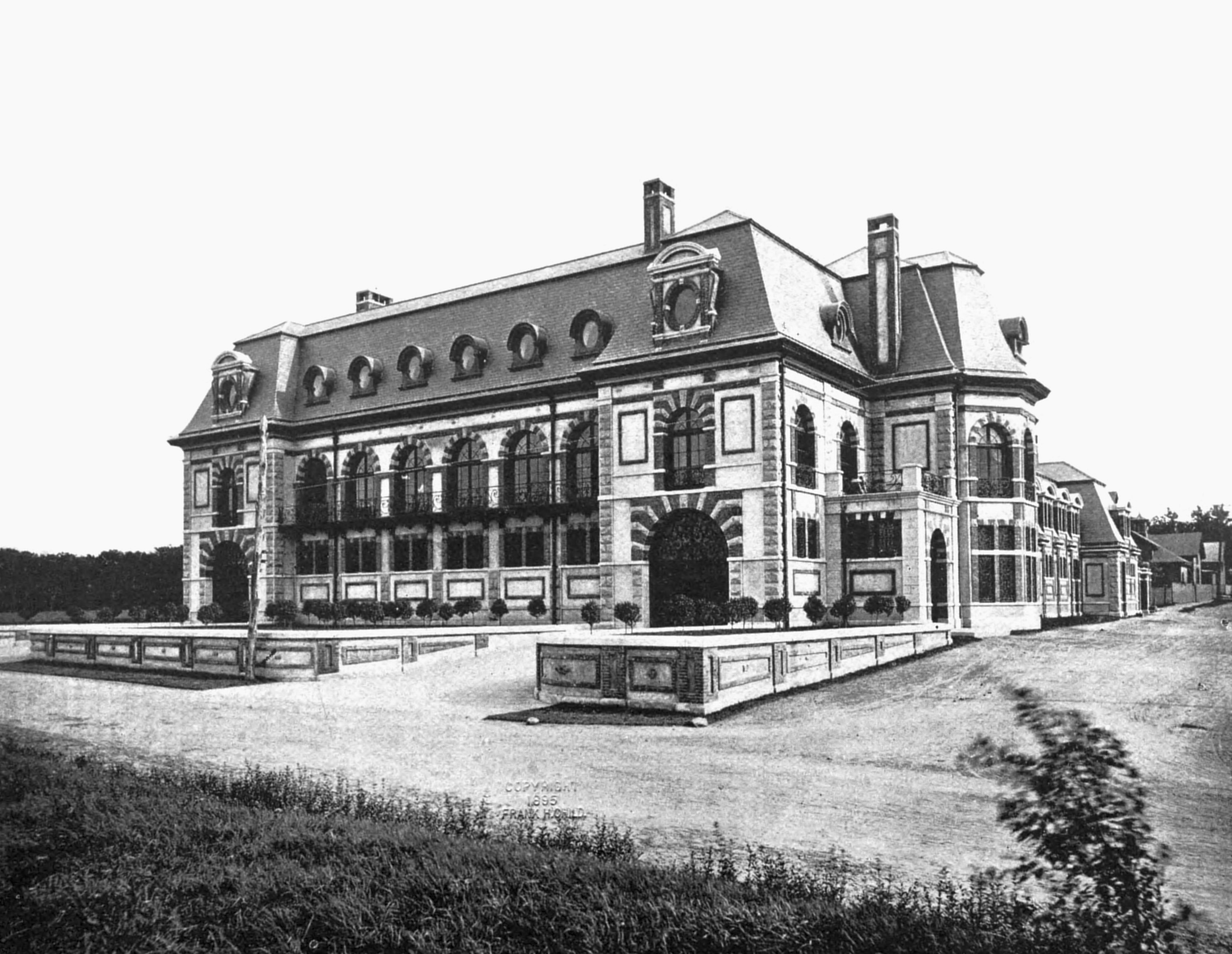
Belcourt of Newport

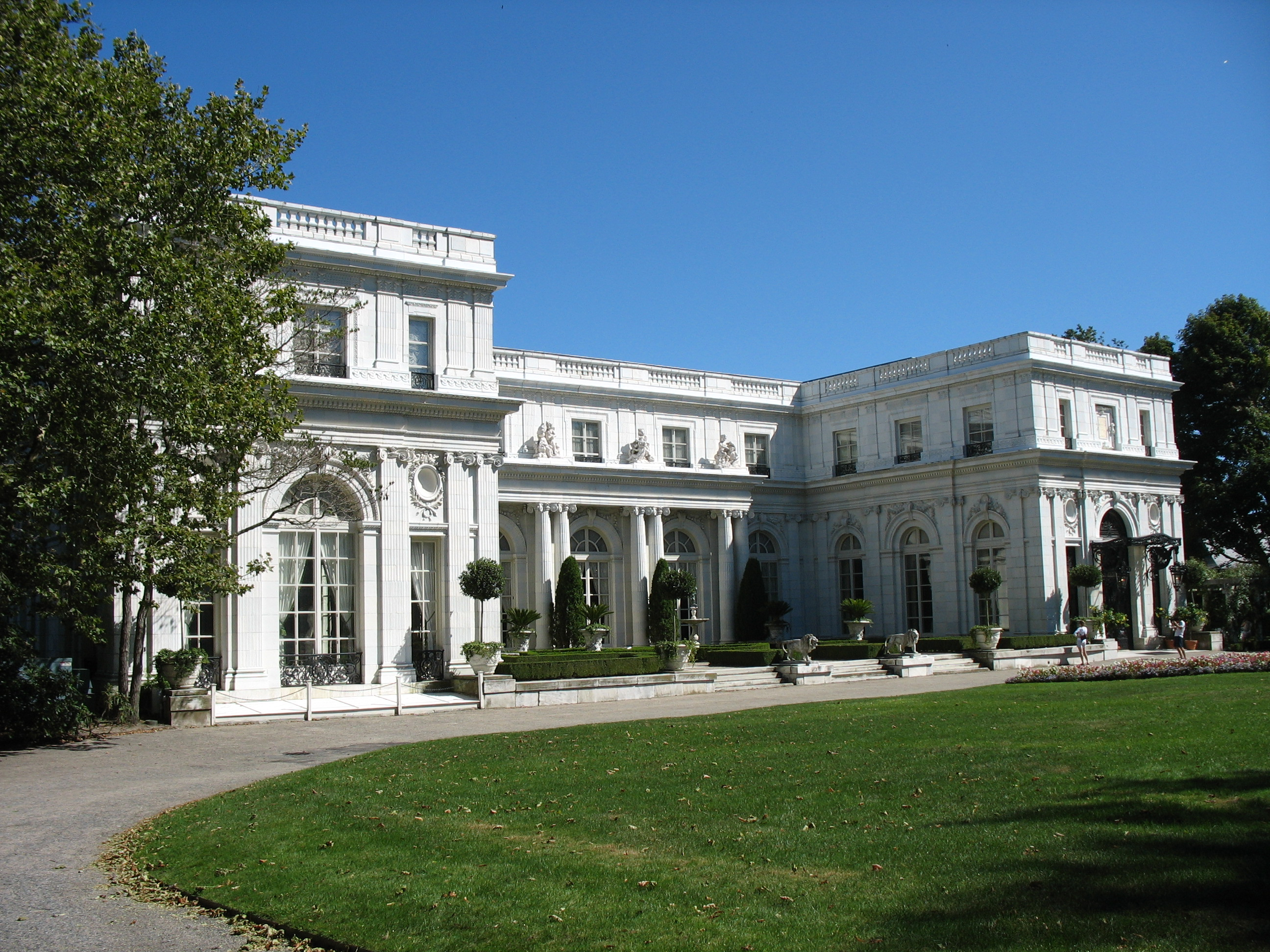
Rosecliff

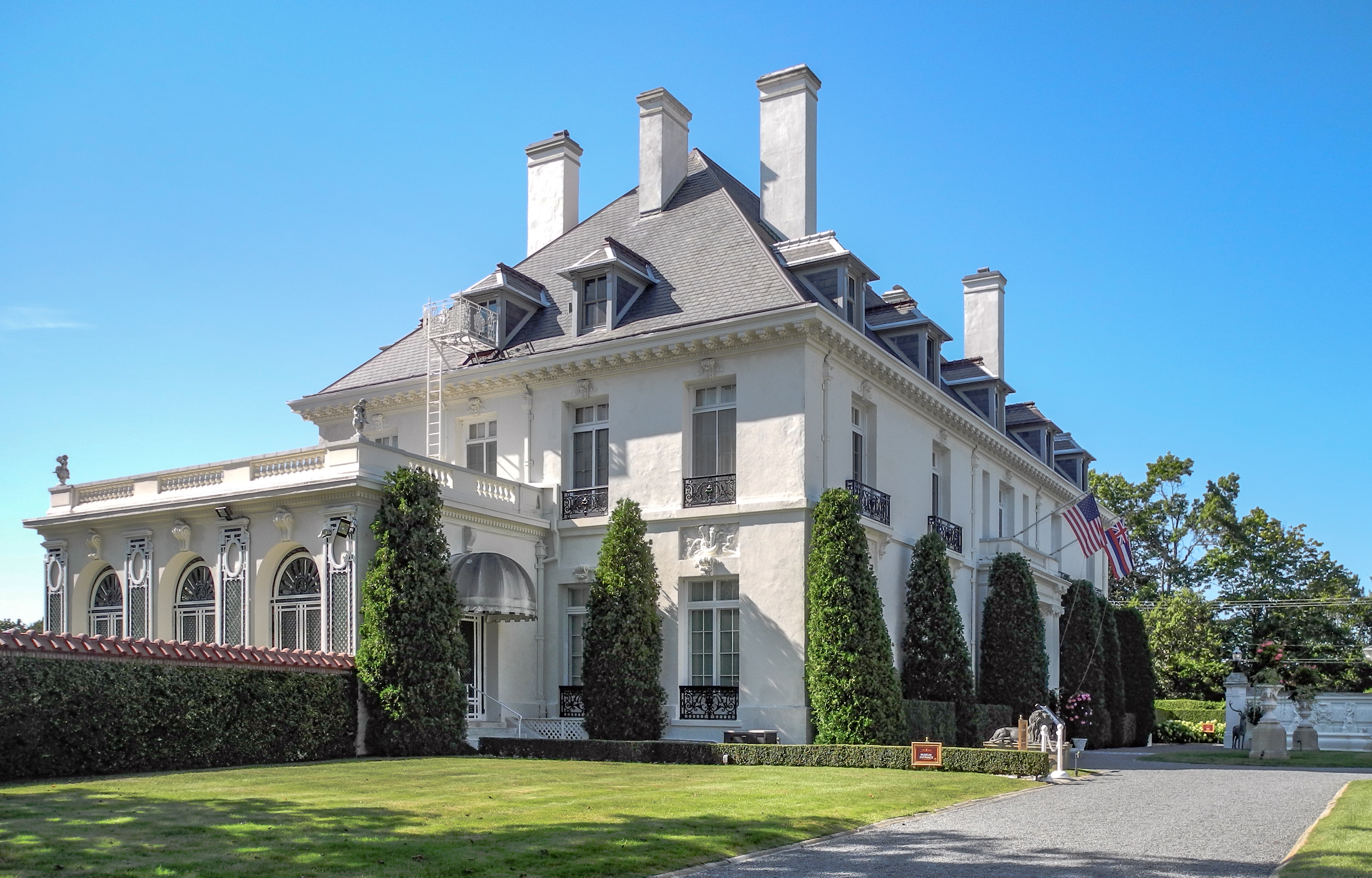
Vernon Court

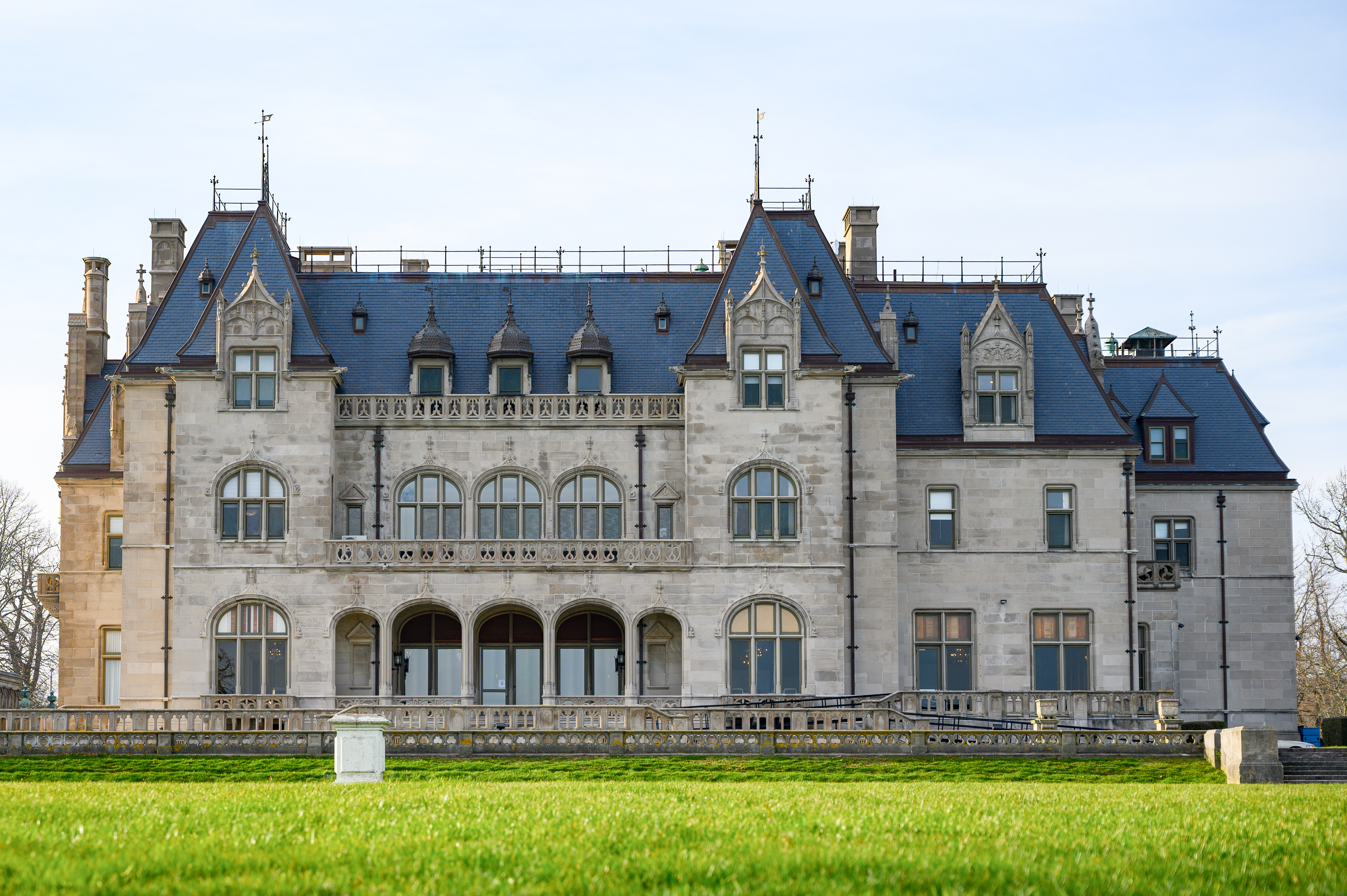
Ochre Court

== Historic District Commission ==
To maintain the district's historic character, the city created its Historic District Commission (HDC) at the same time as the district itself. It consists of nine citizens appointed to three-year terms by the City Council to oversee not just the downtown historic district but Newport's other historic districts, two of which (downtown and Ocean Drive) are also recognized as National Historic Landmarks. The city considers them all one large district for its administrative purposes.

The HDC must review any exterior alterations to a building in the district beyond ordinary maintenance and repair, and issue a Certificate of Appropriateness. It cannot order any changes made to a property.

== See also ==
- Bellevue Avenue/Casino Historic District, covering a portion of this district
- List of National Historic Landmarks in Rhode Island
- National Register of Historic Places listings in Newport County, Rhode Island
- Ochre Point-Cliffs Historic District, covering another portion of this district
