= Isaac Bell House =

Historic house in Rhode Island, United States

- U.S. National Register of Historic Places
- U.S. National Historic Landmark
- U.S. National Historic Landmark District – Contributing property
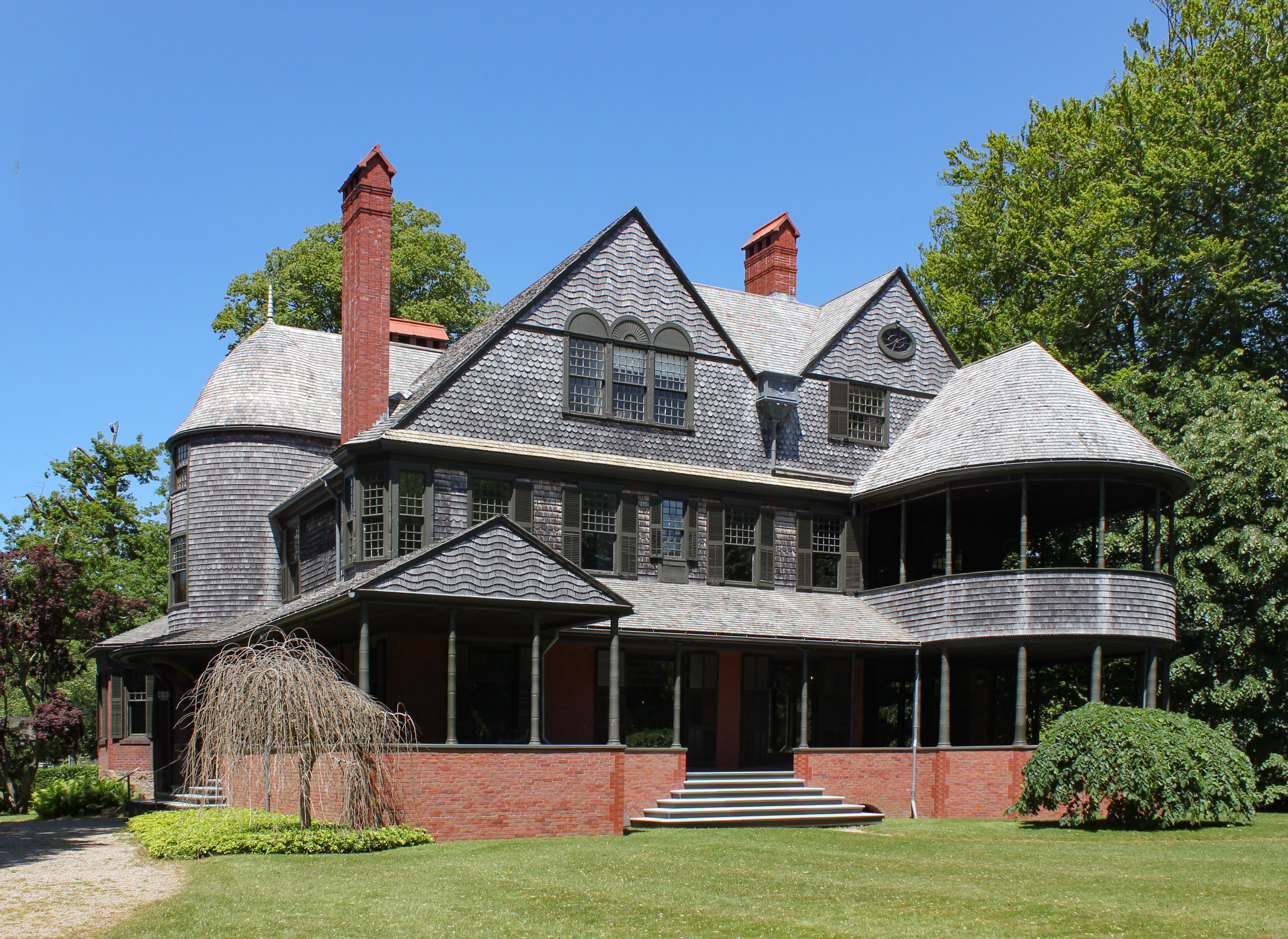
- Front elevation, 2018

- Location within Rhode Island Location within the United States
- Location: 70 Perry Street, Newport, RI
- Coordinates: 41°28′45.75″N 71°18′35.06″W
- Area: 1 acre (0.40 ha)
- Built: 1881-1883
- Architect: McKim, Mead and White
- Architectural style: Shingle style
- Part of: Bellevue Avenue Historic District (ID72000023)
- NRHP reference No.: 72000022 (original); 97001276 (NHL)

Significant dates
- Added to NRHP: January 13, 1972
- Designated NHL: September 25, 1997
- Designated NHLDCP: December 8, 1972

The Isaac Bell House (also known as Edna Villa) is a historic house at 70 Perry Street, at the corner with Bellevue Avenue, in Newport, Rhode Island, United States. Designed by McKim, Mead, and White, it is one of the country's outstanding examples of Shingle Style architecture. The house was built during the Gilded Age, when Newport was the summer resort of choice for some of America's wealthiest families, and is designated as a National Historic Landmark.

== History ==
House interior seen in 1886

Isaac Bell Jr. was a successful cotton broker and investor, and the brother-in-law of James Gordon Bennett Jr., publisher of the New York Herald. Bell hired the New York architectural firm of McKim, Mead, and White (Charles Follen McKim, William R. Mead, and Stanford White) to design his summer cottage. Known in Newport for designing Newport Casino, and later in Boston for designing Boston Central Library, they also designed Pennsylvania Station in New York City. Construction took place between 1881 and 1883.

Shingle Style was pioneered by Henry Hobson Richardson in his design for the William Watts Sherman House, also in Newport. This style of Victorian architecture, featuring the extensive use of wooden shingles on the exterior, acquired some popularity in the late nineteenth century. The Isaac Bell House exemplifies this through its unpainted wood shingles, simple window and trim detail, and multiple porches. It combines elements of the English Arts and Crafts movement philosophy, colonial American detailing, and features a Japanese-inspired open floor plan and bamboo-style porch columns. Interior features include inglenook fireplaces, natural rattan wall coverings, wall paneling and narrow-band wooden floors.

During its life, the house has variously been divided into apartments and served as a nursing home. With the help of Carol Chiles Ballard, the house was bought in 1994 by the Preservation Society of Newport County, which won awards for its restoration, and now operates it as a museum.

The Isaac Bell House was declared a National Historic Landmark in 1997.

== Gallery ==
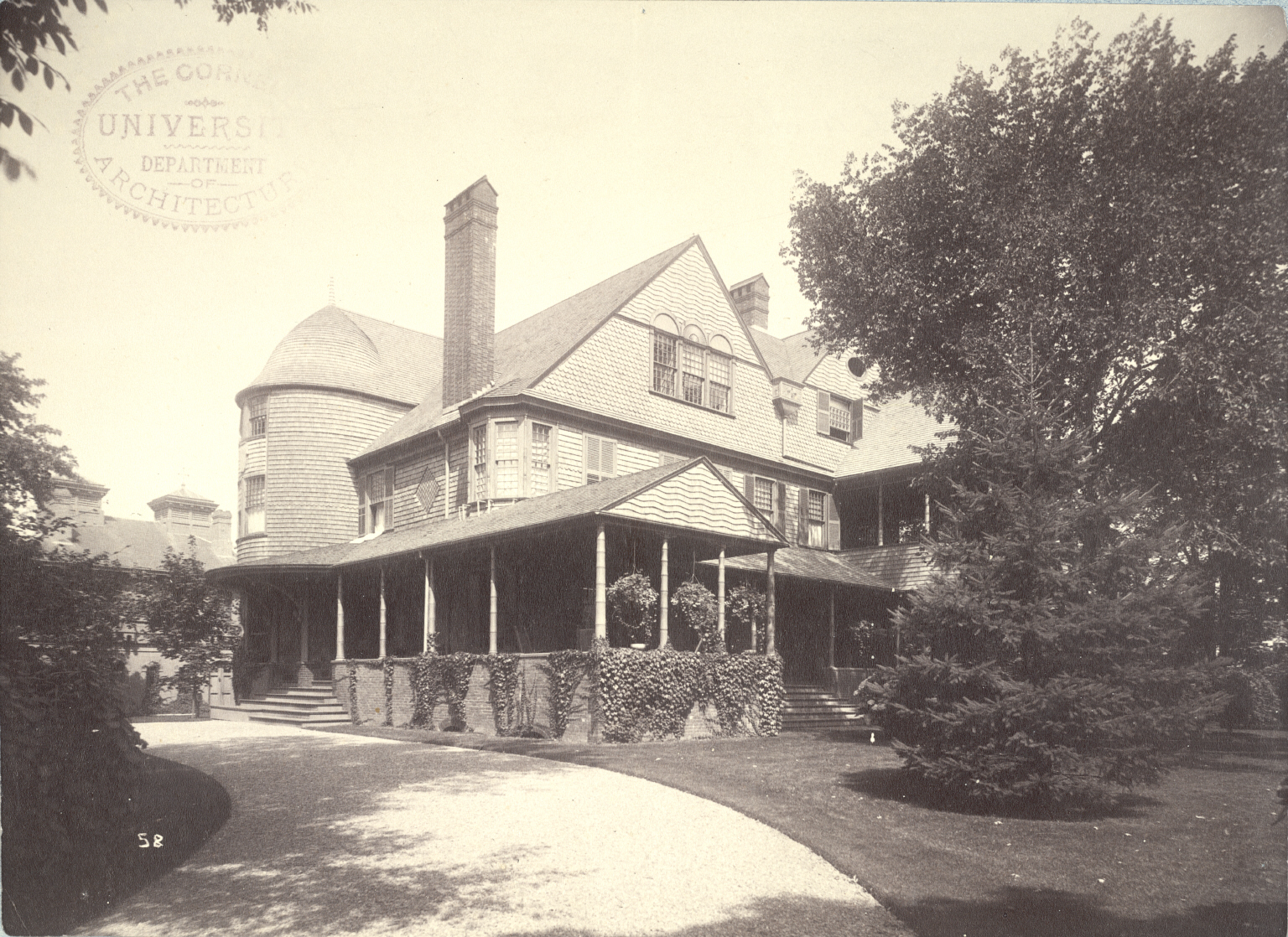
Isaac Bell House ca. 1890

Front East elevation of the house

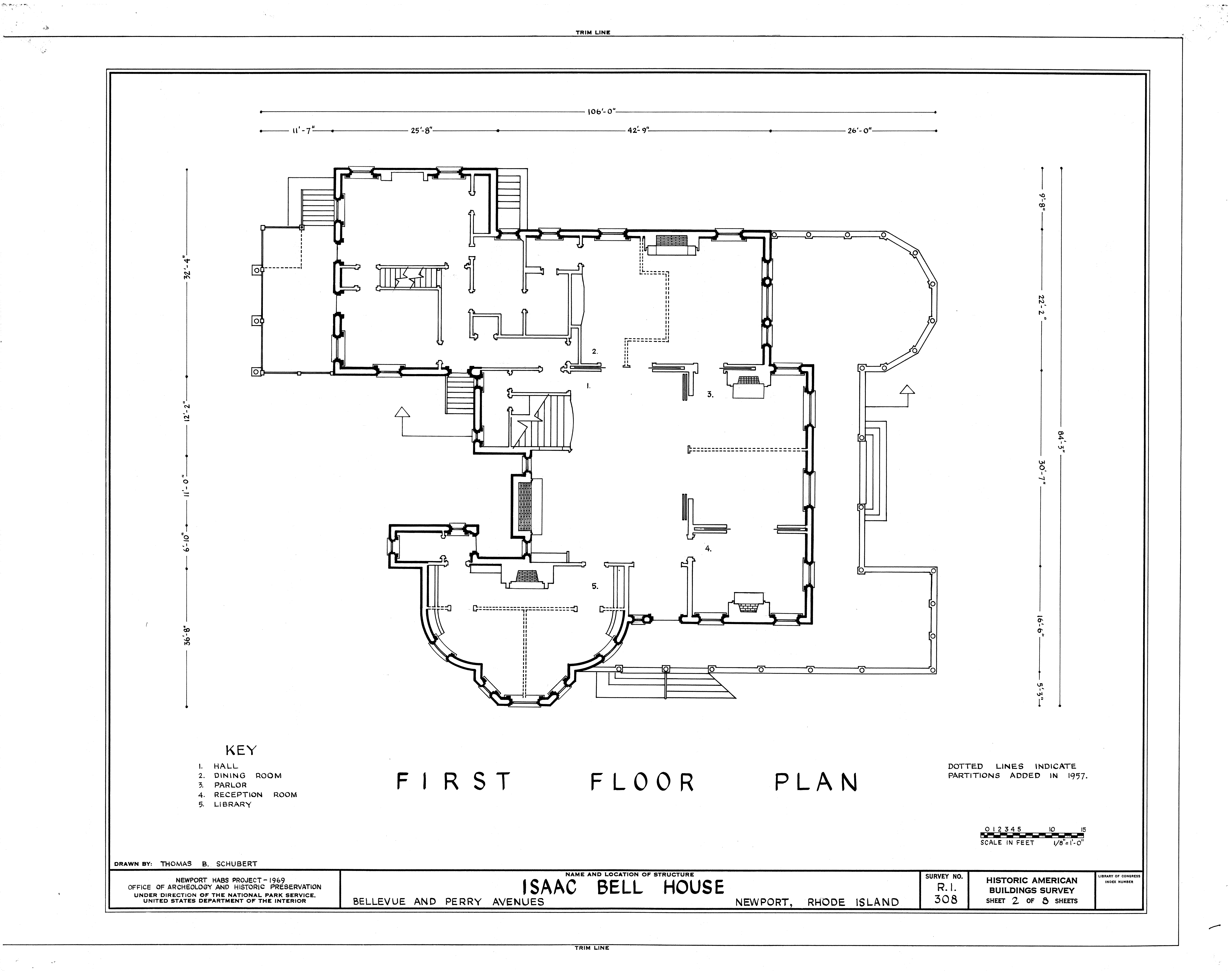
First Floor plan

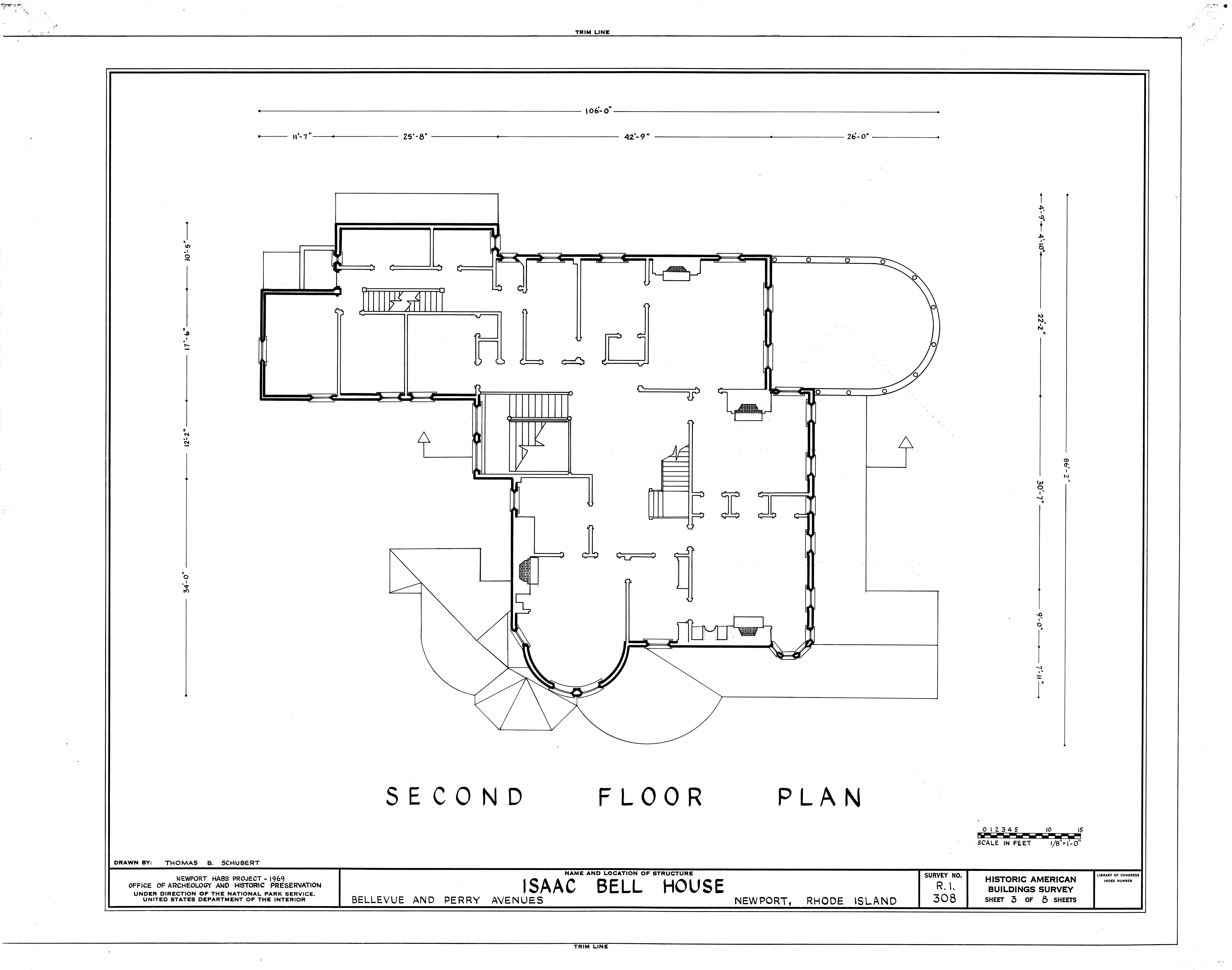
Second Floor plan

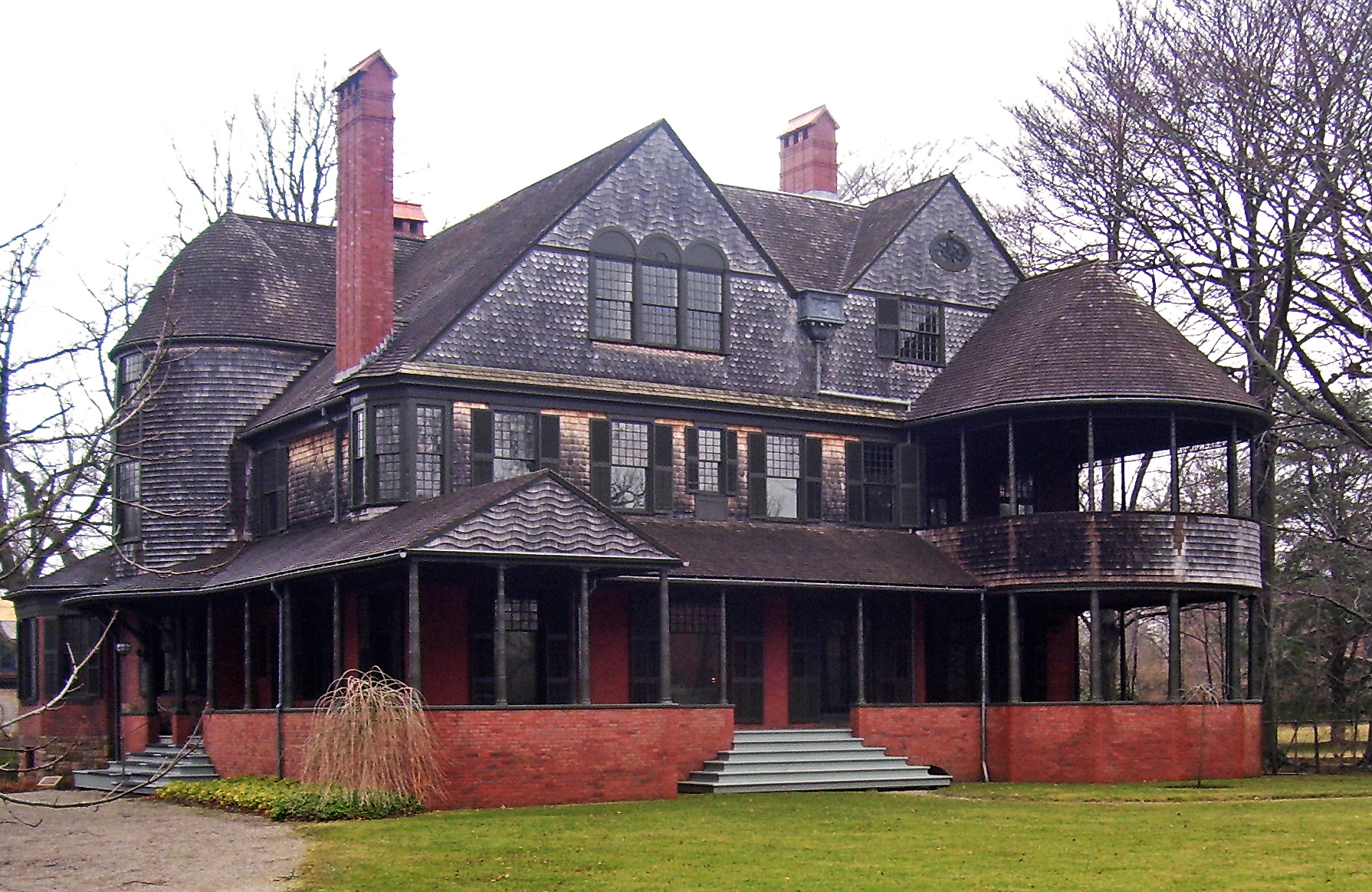
Isaac Bell House in 2008

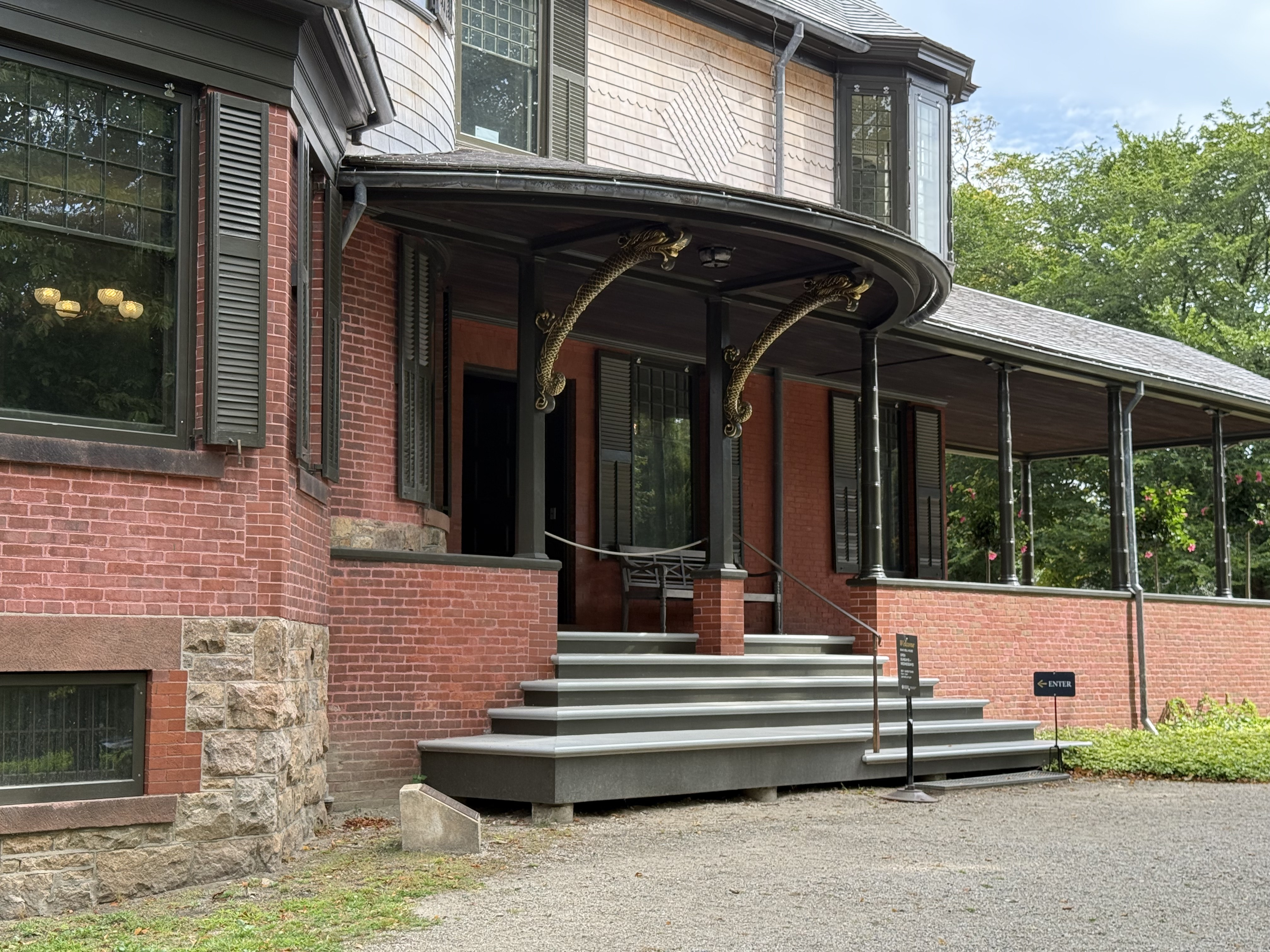
Main entry steps, 2025

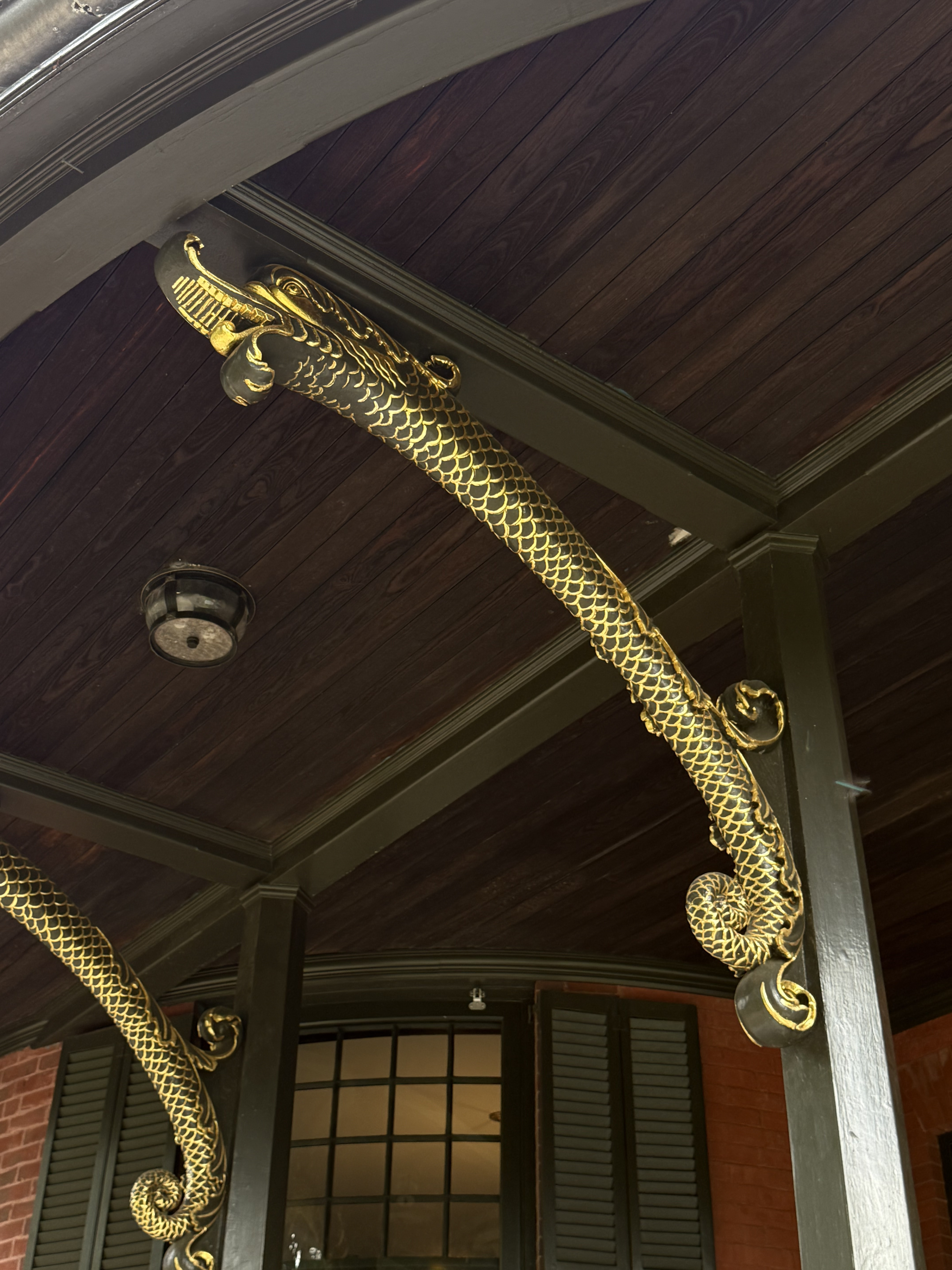
Porch roof bracket in the form of a dolphin, 2025

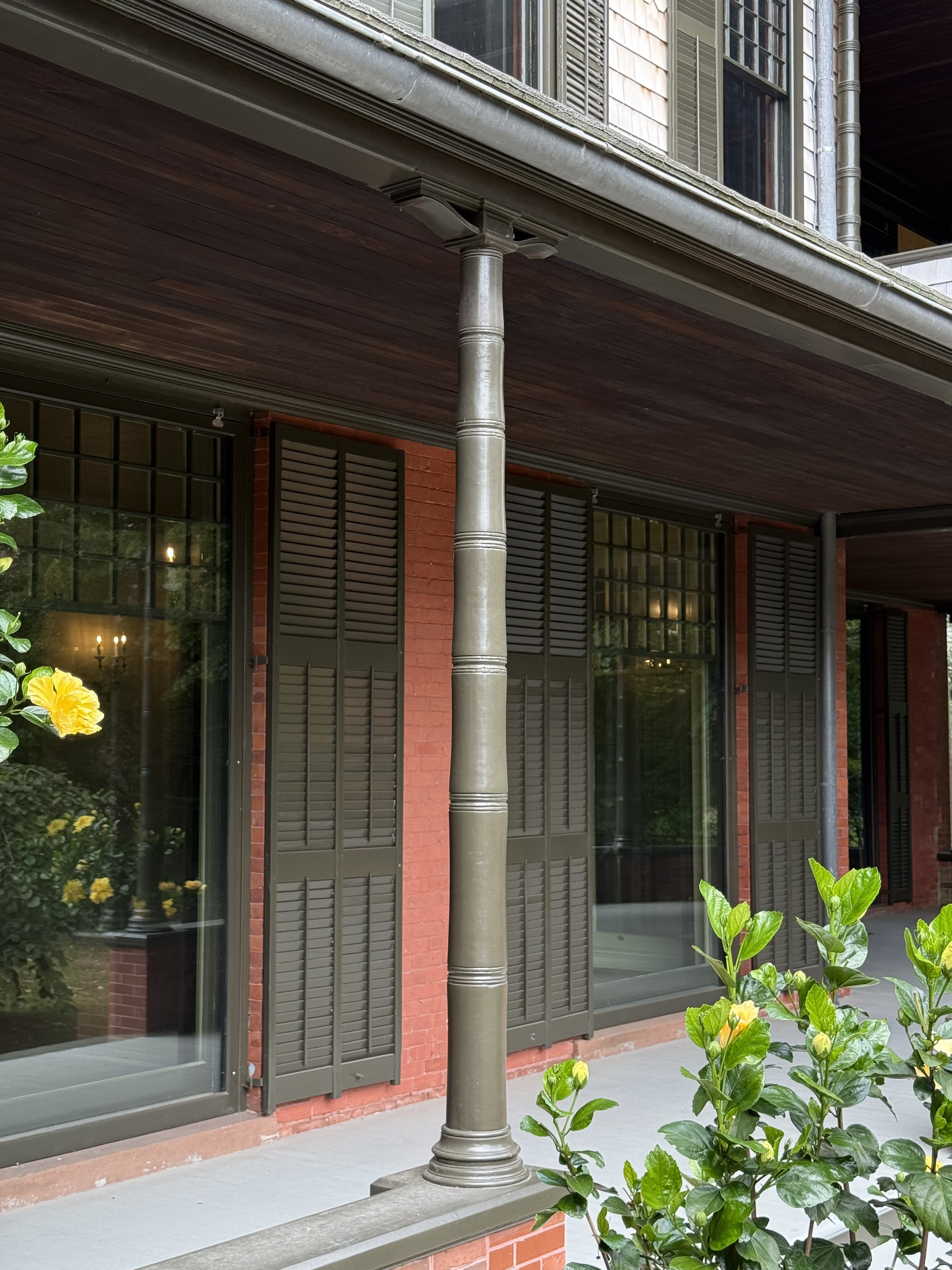
Porch column designed to look like bamboo, 2025

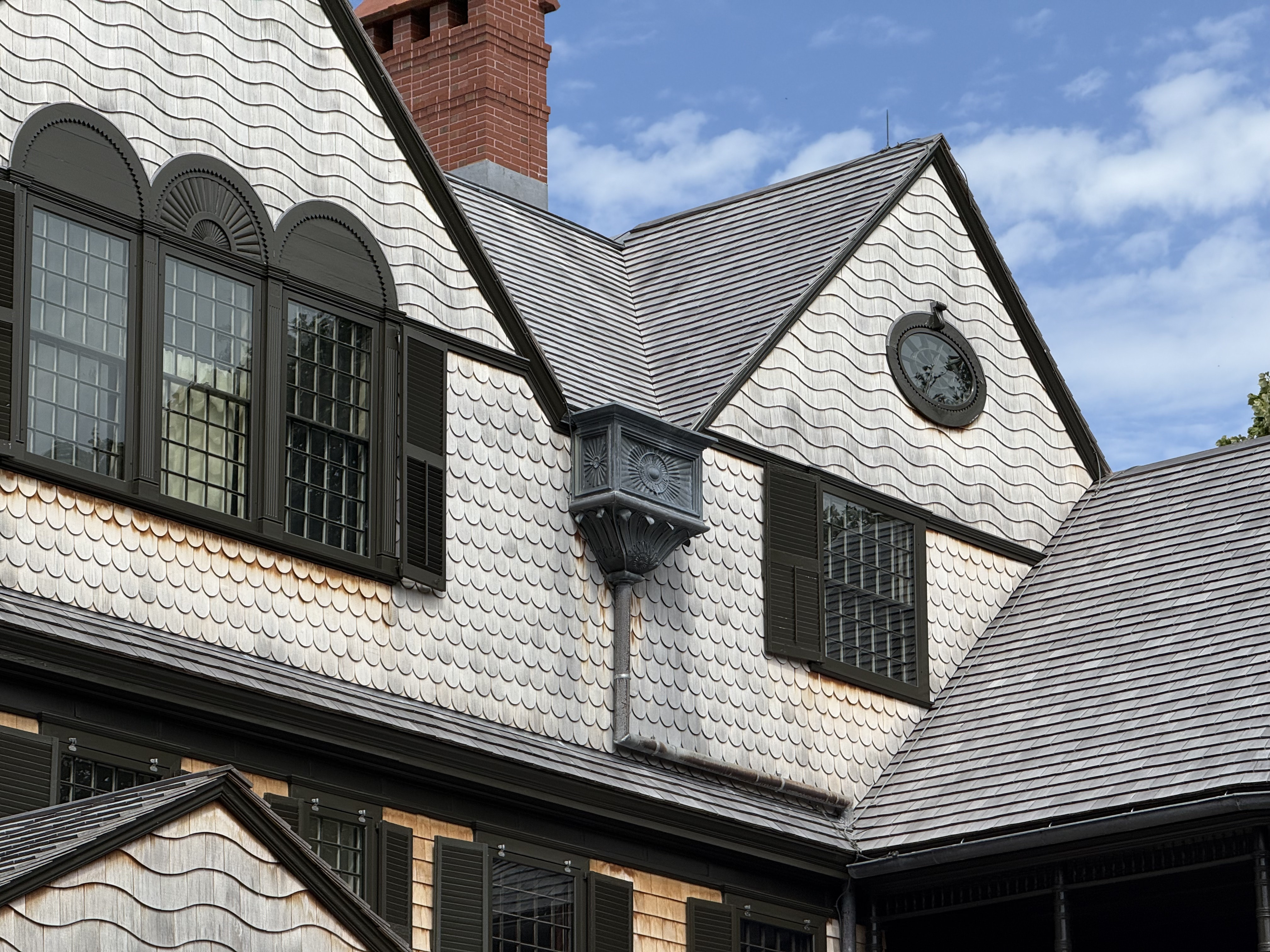
Partial view of the east facade, 2025

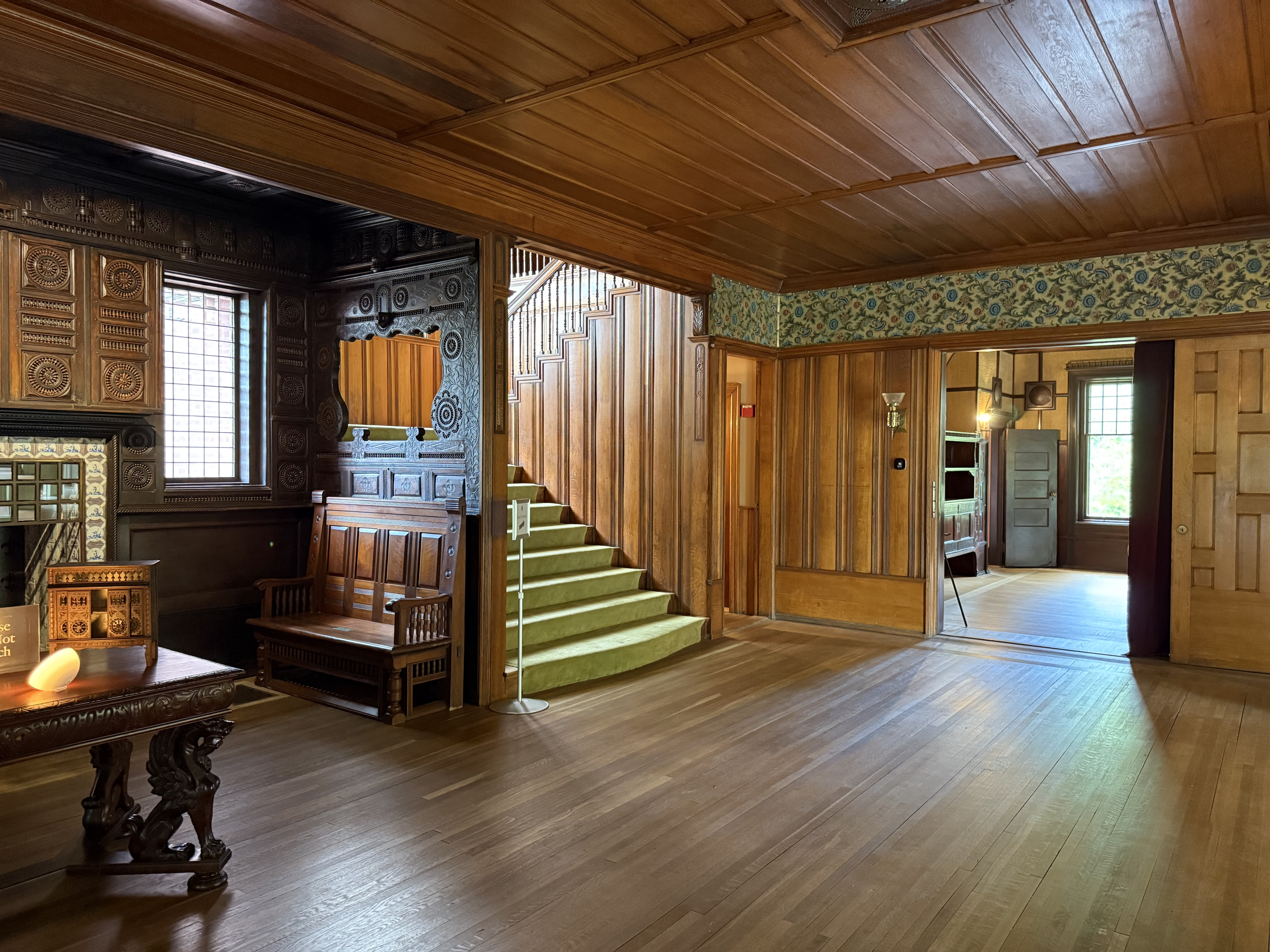
View of main stair from the central hall, 2025

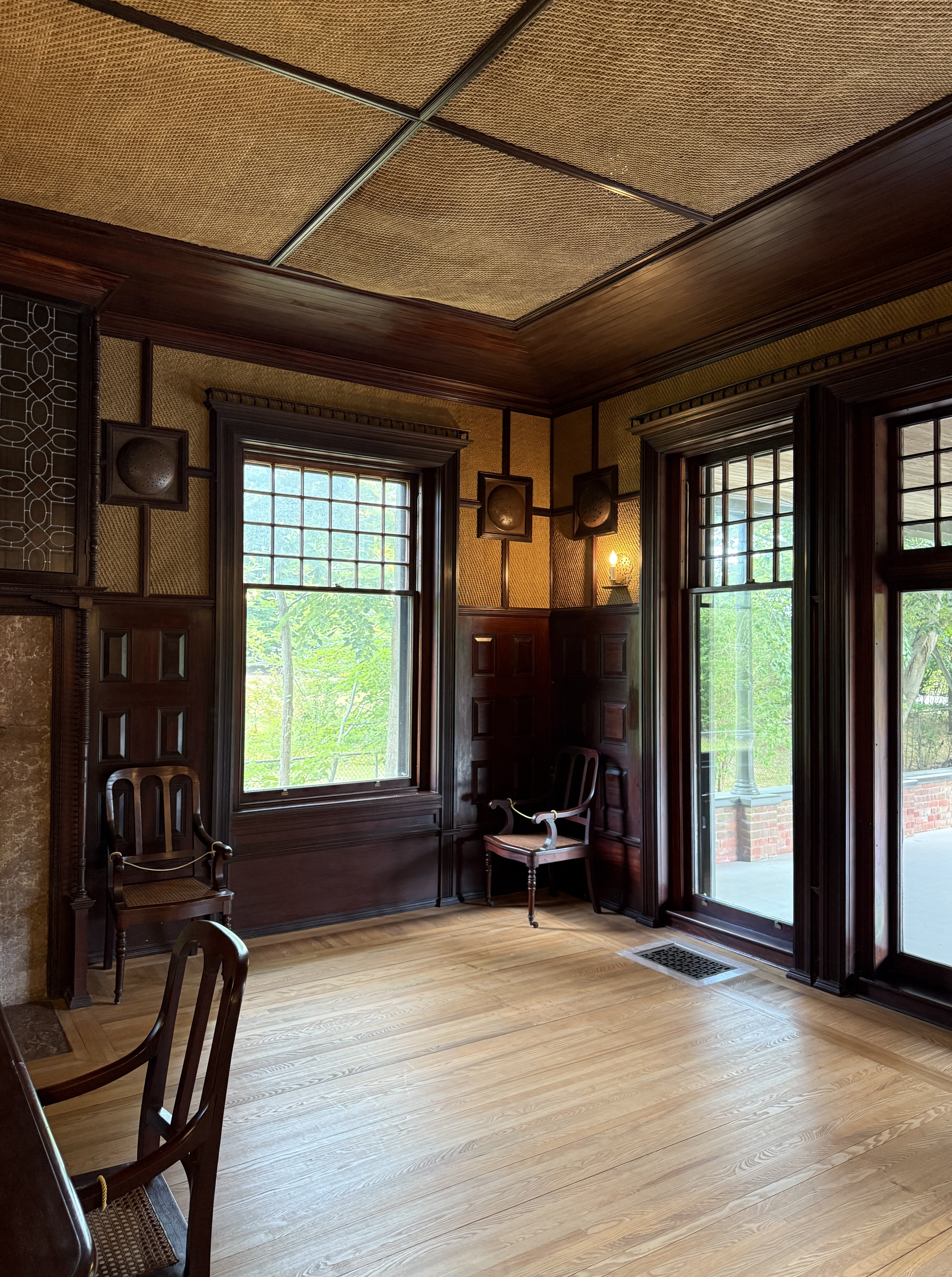
Northeast corner of dining room, 2025

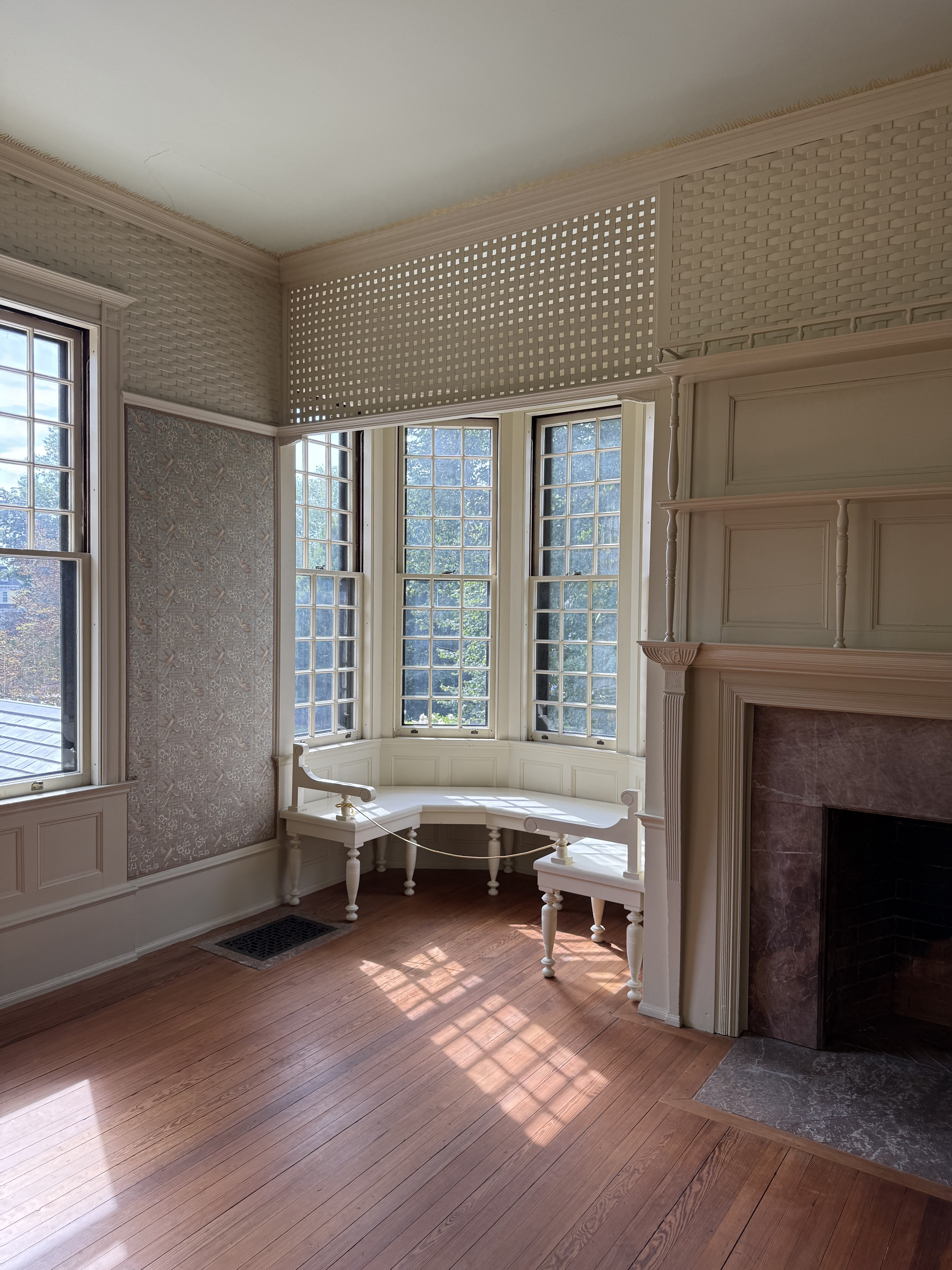
Interior southeast corner at second floor showing the bay window with seating, 2025

== See also ==
- List of National Historic Landmarks in Rhode Island
- National Register of Historic Places listings in Newport County, Rhode Island
