= Beechwood (Astor mansion) =

Historic mansion in Newport, Rhode Island, US

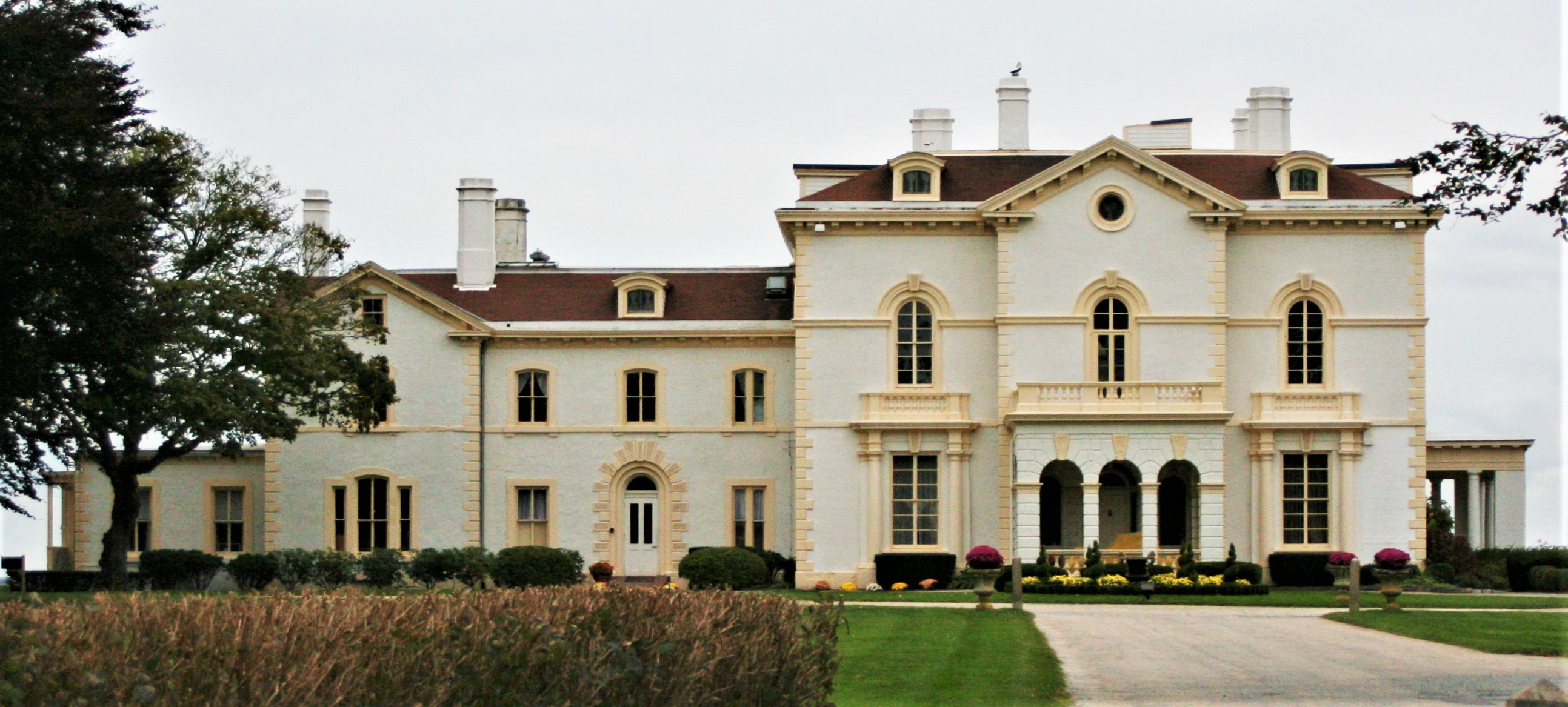
- The front of Beechwood in 2008
- Alternative names: Daniel Parish House

General information
- Architectural style: Italianate
- Location: Newport, Rhode Island, United States
- Coordinates: 41.4634°N 71.3051°W
- Completed: 1853, rebuilt in 1856
- Client: Daniel Parish
- Owner: Larry Ellison (since 2010)

Technical details
- Size: 16,400 square feet (1,520 m^{2})

Design and construction
- Architects: Downing and Vaux (construction); Richard Morris Hunt (renovations); McKim, Mead & White (renovations)

Beechwood is a Gilded Age mansion and estate located at 580 Bellevue Avenue in Newport, Rhode Island best known for having been owned by the Astor family. Part of the Bellevue Avenue Historic District, the first version of the residence was built between 1852 and 1853 and designed in the Italianate style by Andrew Jackson Downing and Calvert Vaux. Following a fire in 1855, Vaux rebuilt the house with modified plans. Richard Morris Hunt renovated the estate in 1881 after it was bought the year before by William Backhouse Astor, Jr. As of 2025, it remains a private residence and is not open to the public.

== History ==
Beechwood was built as a marine villa for New Yorker Daniel Parish, a clothing merchant whose operations extended to Southern cities. Being a nephew of Thomas Powell, a steamboat magnate from Newburgh, New York, Parish commissioned the design from Andrew Jackson Downing and Calvert Vaux, whose office was based there. Downing's trip to visit the building site with Parish in July 1852 never occurred; he died in a steamboat accident before reaching New York. Vaux completed the house in 1853 with a "Palladian spirit" and published it in his book Villas and Cottages (1857). After a fire in 1855, it was rebuilt in 1856 with alterations to the original plans, Vaux superintending the construction.

In 1880, Beechwood was purchased by William Backhouse Astor Jr. for $190,941.50. He had married Caroline Webster Schermerhorn, who would be known as "the Mrs. Astor". Between 1888 and 1890, Mrs. Astor hired architect Richard Morris Hunt to do many renovations, including the addition of a ballroom to fit the famous "Four Hundred". The house also boasts a library, a dining room and a music room with wallpaper imported from Paris. Beechwood became the showplace for many of Mrs. Astor's dinner parties.

When Mrs. Astor died in 1908, Beechwood was left to her son, John Jacob Astor IV, who married his second wife Madeleine in its ballroom in 1911. After Jack's death on the Titanic in 1912, it passed to his son Vincent (by his first wife, Ava). Vincent later rented out the home to Robert R. Young, a New York financier.

In 1940, Allene Tew and her fifth husband, Count Pavel de Kotzebue, purchased Beechwood from Vincent Astor. Over the course of the subsequent four decades, the house was owned in succession by James Cameron Clark, Gurnee Dyer, William W. Carey, John Page-Blair and Richard Merrill.

=== Paul Madden ownership (1981–2010) ===
In 1981, Beechwood was purchased by Paul M. Madden from Beverly Farms, Massachusetts, who was a recent graduate of the National Film and Television School in the United Kingdom. He undertook extensive renovations, including a new main entrance onto Bellevue Avenue.

Together with the University of Rhode Island History and Drama Departments, he started the "Beechwood Theatre Company", which conducted live theatrical tours to over a million mansion visitors. In 1981, Paul Madden re-opened the renovated house with 20 costumed actors who were trained to remain in character as they played all the roles of a Victorian household, including butlers, footmen, maids, and doormen. The tour featured actors portraying the daily lives of those who inhabited, ran, and cared for the estate. During its time as a tourist attraction, the estate was marketed as "Astors' Beechwood Mansion".

During off-season months (February to May), the actors played roles as "servants" of the Astors and provided tours of the estate as if it was 1891. Visitors were treated as though they were "applicants" for summer jobs on Mrs. Astor's staff, and they "applied" for any job they wished. The staff positions included gardener, footman, butler, chef, housemaid and many others. During the summer months, when the pretend "Astor family" was living in the mansion, the actors played roles as Astor family members and gave tours to guests. The people working at the mansion pretended that it was 1891 and acted in-character throughout each tour.

The tour included two sides of the house: first, the family's side where the Astors lived, and second, the servants' side, which included kitchens and servants' quarters, as well as an area for the children to live. The children of the Astor family lived with the servants until the age of 17, when they were considered adults and fully prepared for social functions. Children of the family were quickly wed at the age of 18, or as soon as possible after reaching 18.

During the 1980s, Paul Madden hosted many of Newport's most noteworthy social events at Beechwood. The events included a recreation of Mrs. Astor's "400 Ball" with honorary chairman Mary Jaqueline Astor, a dinner dance for Vice President and Mrs. George Bush on August 14, 1981, a dinner in honor of Prince and Princess Michael of Kent for the British America's Cup team, and a dinner dance for the Duke of Marlborough for the English-Speaking Union.

The British America's Cup Challenge Ball in 1983 was held in honor of Prince Andrew. It was the most lavish event of the America's Cup that year, with a dinner for one thousand guests and entertainment that included the Regimental Band of Her Majesty's Irish Guards, as well as Peter Duchin's band.

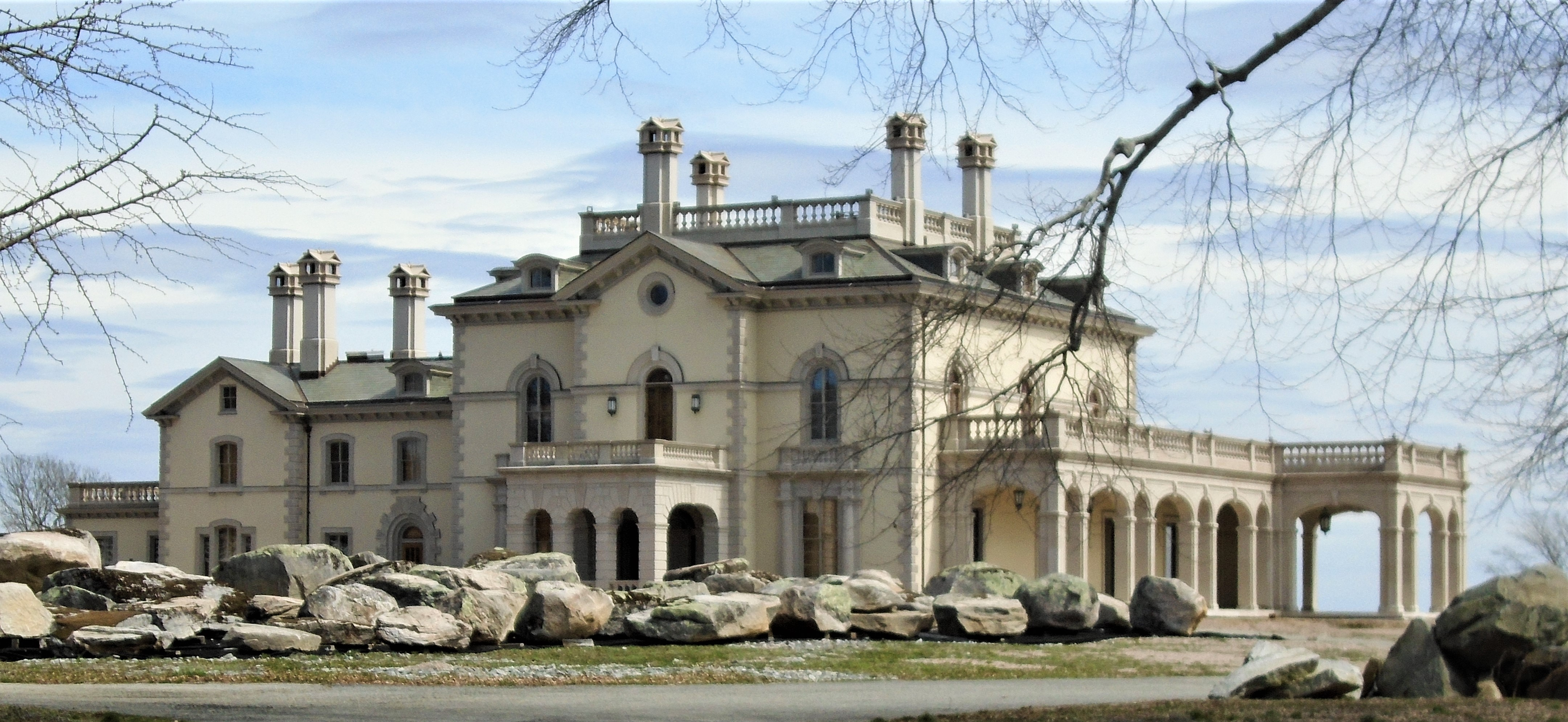
Beechwood in 2021

=== Larry Ellison ownership (2010–present) ===
In January 2010, the Beechwood Theatre Company was reorganized under the umbrella of the 501(c)(3) non-profit Beechwood Foundation as the Marley Bridges Theatre Company, and the Beechwood estate was sold for $10.5 million to Oracle Corporation co-founder Larry Ellison. Ellison, who was in Newport during the summer of 2009 for training with his BMW Oracle Racing team, is linked to a deed filed at City Hall that documents the $10.5 million sale of the 39-room mansion. Ellison reportedly spent over $100 million restoring the mansion and the other buildings on the estate to the condition that Richard Morris Hunt brought them in 1881, although as of August 2018 landscaping of the grounds had not begun.

As of 2012, Ellison plans to convert the mansion's first floor into the "Beechwood Art Museum", displaying his collection of 18th- and 19th-century art. In December 2017, Beechwood was issued a permanent certificate of occupancy. In February 2019, it was reported that Ellison purchased the Seacliff home at 562 Bellevue Avenue (for $11 million), "thus giving him ownership of all four properties between Rosecliff and Marble House", which reunited the original 9-acre estate that William B. Astor Jr. had created in 1881.

== In popular culture ==
Beechwood was featured in a second-season episode of Ghost Hunters, in which the TAPS team investigated claims of paranormal activity.

The house exterior is represented by Chateau-sur-Mer, while the interior is represented by a combination of the Belcourt Caslte and the Marble House in the fictional HBO/Julian Fellowes series The Gilded Age, season one, episode 8, in which Mrs. Russell attempts a tour of the renovated estate before Mrs. Astor unexpectedly arrives and she is shuffled out the back servants’ door.
