= Rovensky (surname) =

Rovensky (Russian: Ровенский, Czech: Rovenský) is a surname. Notable people with the surname include:

- Josef Rovenský (1894–1937), Czechoslovak film actor and director
- Mikhail Rovensky (1902–1996), Russian type and book designer
- Václav Karel Holan Rovenský (1644–1718), Czech baroque composer and organist

== See also ==
- Rovensky (disambiguation), other uses including the name of some places
