= Rovensky District =

Location of Belgorod Oblast in Russia

Location of Saratov Oblast in Russia

Rovensky District is the name of several administrative and municipal divisions in Russia:

- Rovensky District, Belgorod Oblast, an administrative and municipal district of Belgorod Oblast
- Rovensky District, Saratov Oblast, an administrative and municipal district of Saratov Oblast

== See also ==
- Rovensky (disambiguation)
