= Rovensky (rural locality) =

Rovensky (Russian: Ровенский; masculine), Rovenskaya (Ровенская; feminine), or Rovenskoye (Ровенское; neuter) is the name of several rural localities in Russia:

- Rovensky, Kemerovo Oblast, a settlement in Arsentyevskaya Rural Territory of Kemerovsky District of Kemerovo Oblast
- Rovensky, Novosibirsk Oblast, a settlement in Kargatsky District of Novosibirsk Oblast
- Rovensky, Oryol Oblast, a settlement in Berezovsky Selsoviet of Dmitrovsky District of Oryol Oblast
