= Rovensky Park =

Historic park in Newport, Rhode Island, United States

Coordinates: 41.46008°N 71.30734°W

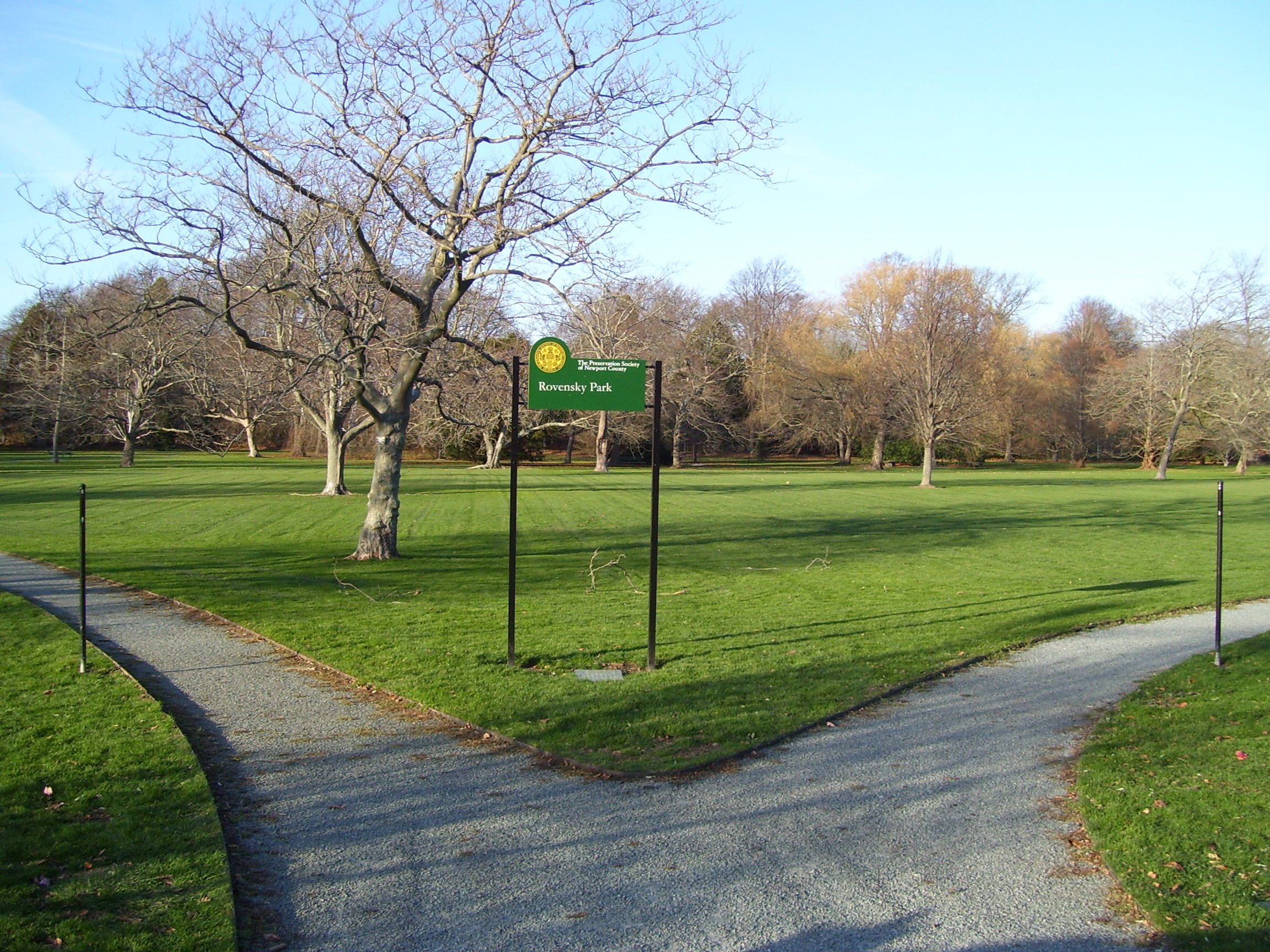
Rovensky Park on Bellevue Avenue

Rovensky Park is a historic park at the corner of Bellevue Avenue and Rovensky Avenue (previously Wheaton Street) in Newport, Rhode Island, United States.

The park grounds were created in 1852, and the park was purchased by the Preservation Society of Newport County in 1959 with $175,000 grant donated by John E. Rovensky in memory of his wife, Mae Cadwell Rovensky. The Rovensky's former house, Clarendon Court, is directly across the street from the park. The park is still owned and maintained by the Preservation Society of Newport County.

== See also ==
- Preservation Society of Newport County
