= Edward J. Berwind House =

Building in Manhattan, New York

Coordinates: 40°46′02″N 73°58′14″W

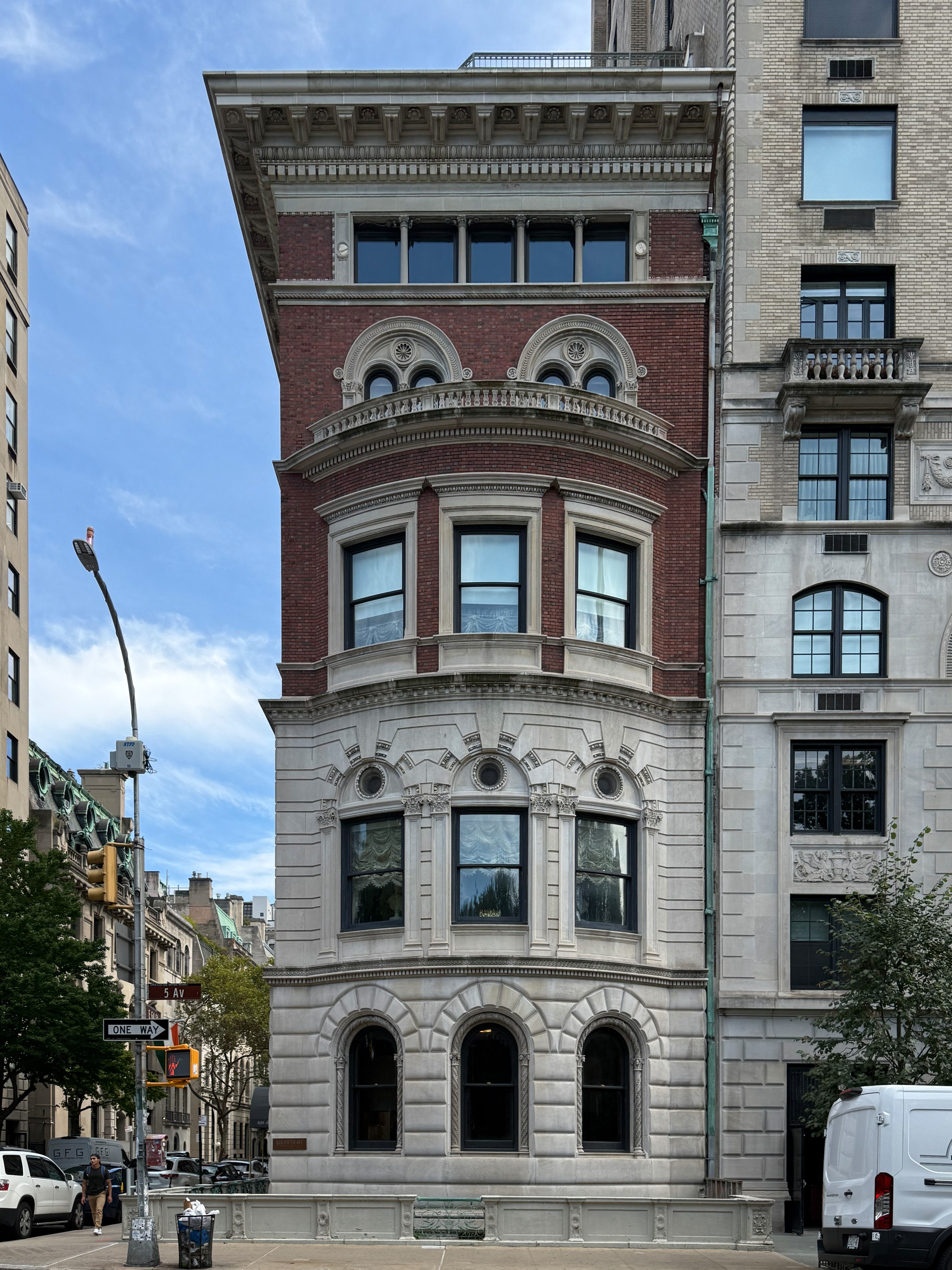
- Fifth Avenue façade overlooking Central Park
- Interactive map of the Edward J. Berwind House area

General information
- Location: 2 East 64th Street, New York City
- Year built: 1886
- Client: Edward J. Berwind

Design and construction
- Architects: Nathan Clark Mellen; Jules Allard (interiors); Louis Ardisson (interiors)

The Edward J. Berwind House is a mansion located on 2 East 64th Street and Fifth Avenue on the Upper East Side of Manhattan in New York City. The structure was designed by Nathan Clark Mellen, with interiors by Jules Allard and sculptor Louis Ardisson.

The mansion was constructed in 1886 for the coal baron Edward J. Berwind, whose company Berwind-White supplied most of the coal used by the US Navy at the time, as well as most of the East Coast railroads and Interborough Rapid Transit Company subway trains in New York City. The interiors of the house have been considered one of the grandest in New York City, comparable to the main reading room of the New York Public Library. Berwind also had a large summer house in Newport, Rhode Island called The Elms, though he lived at the Berwind House in New York until his death in 1936.

The house was sold to the Institute of Aeronautical Sciences in 1945, then became the headquarters for the American Heart Association until 1978 when it was reconverted to residential use with a new penthouse. Other past tenants include Donna Summer, who lived on the main floor for a few years.

== Gallery ==
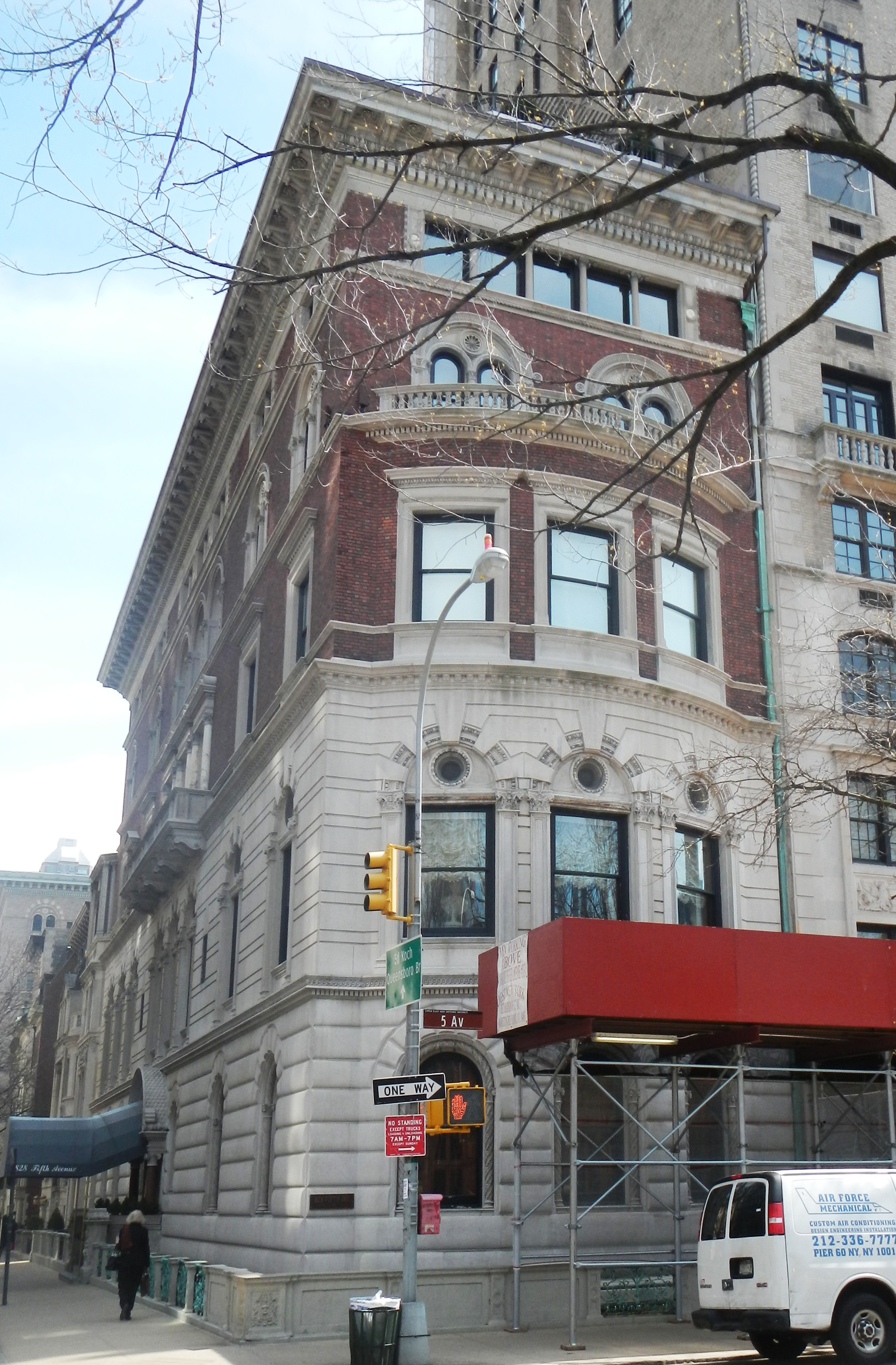
Seen from Fifth Avenue

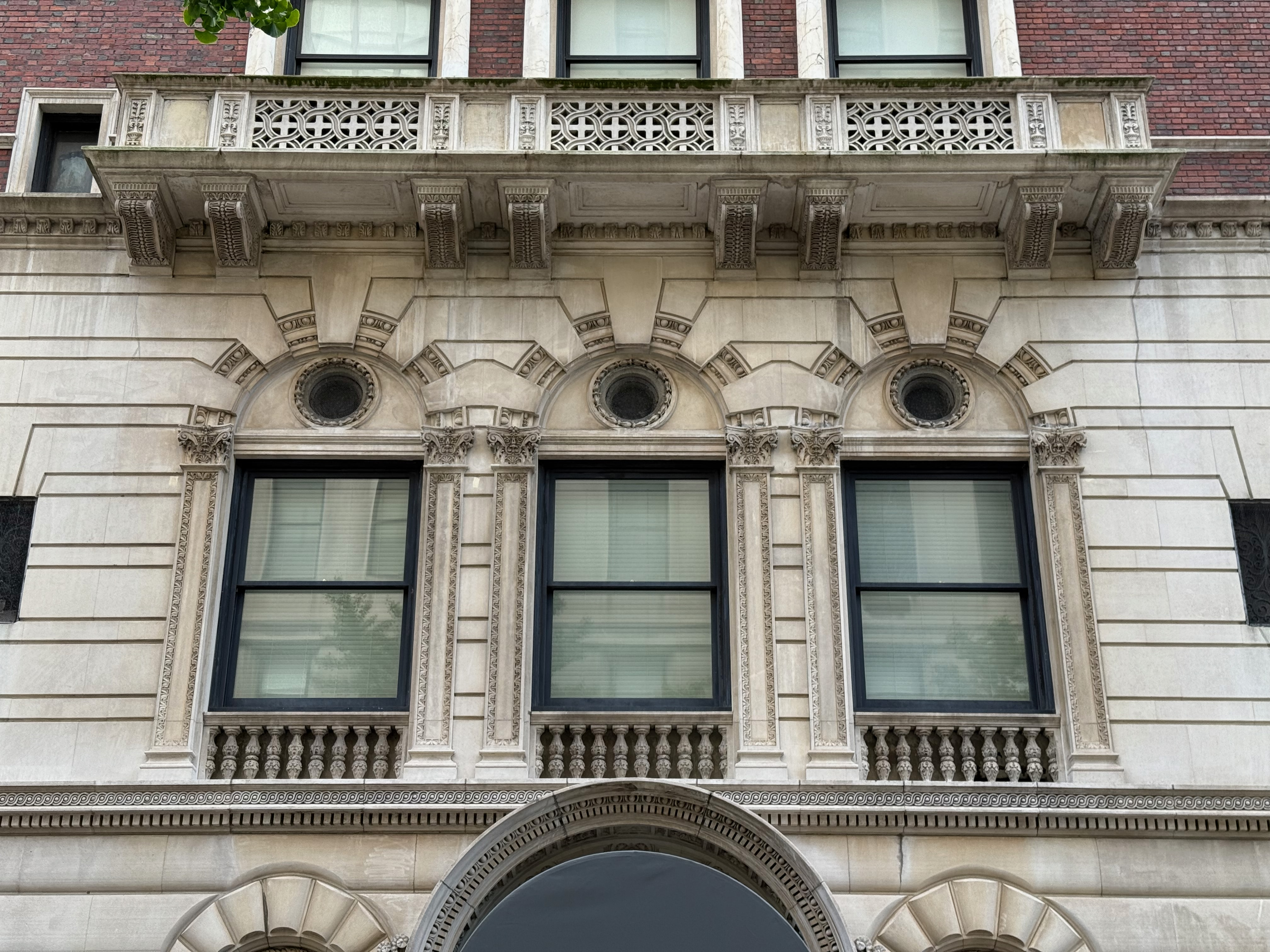
Second story windows above the main entry

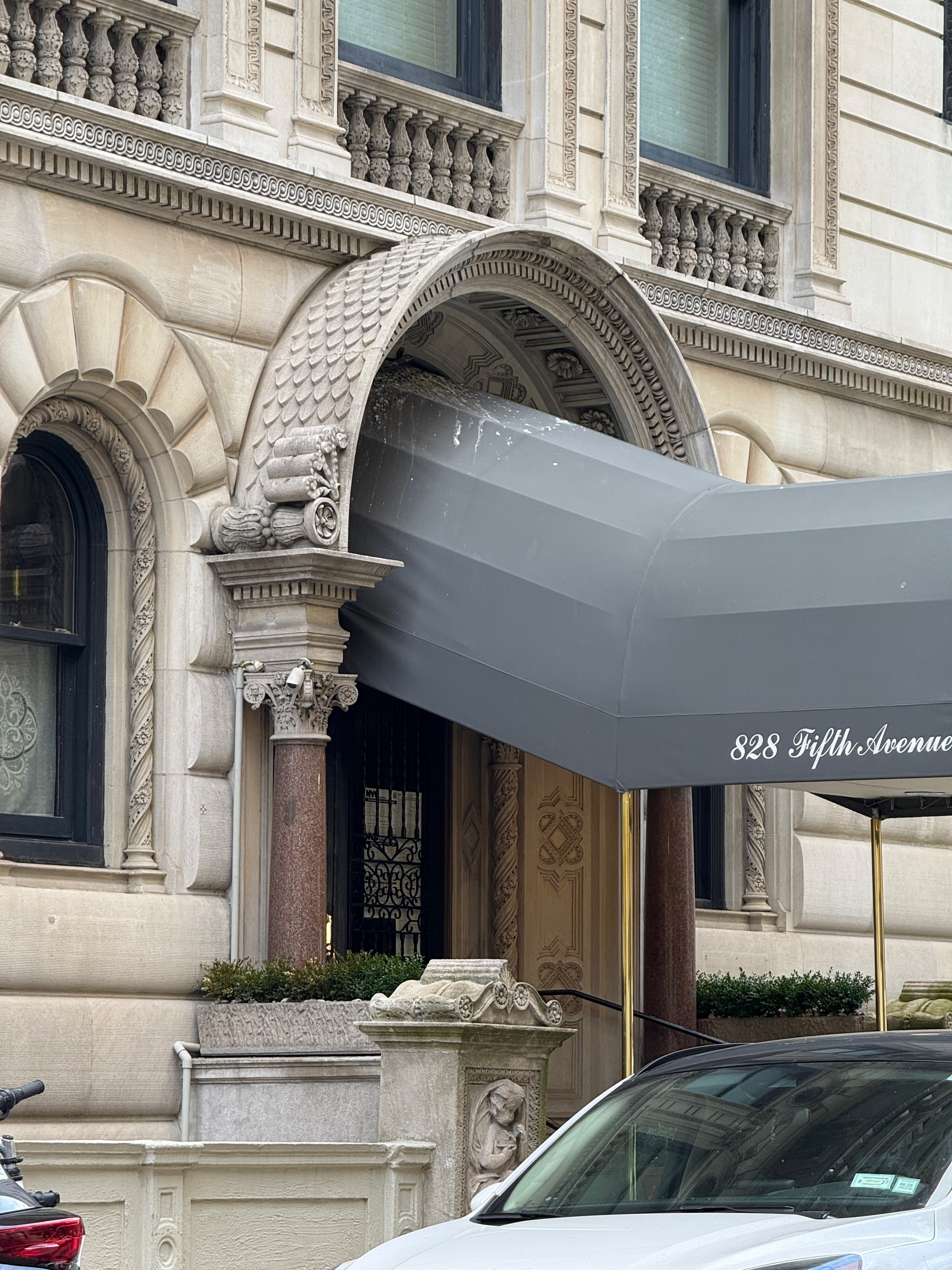
Oblique view of the main entry arch

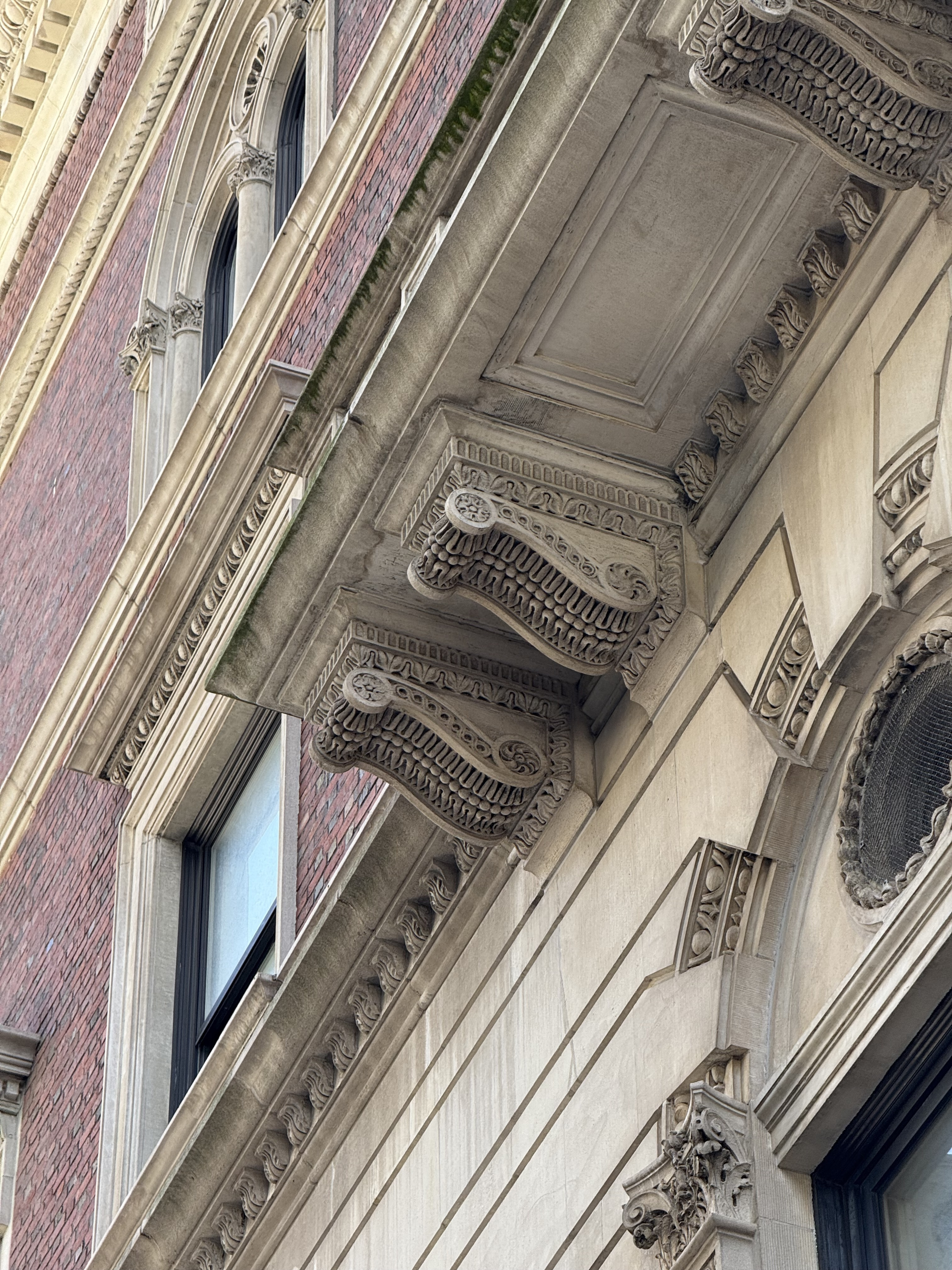
Detail view of corbels on the 64th Street façade

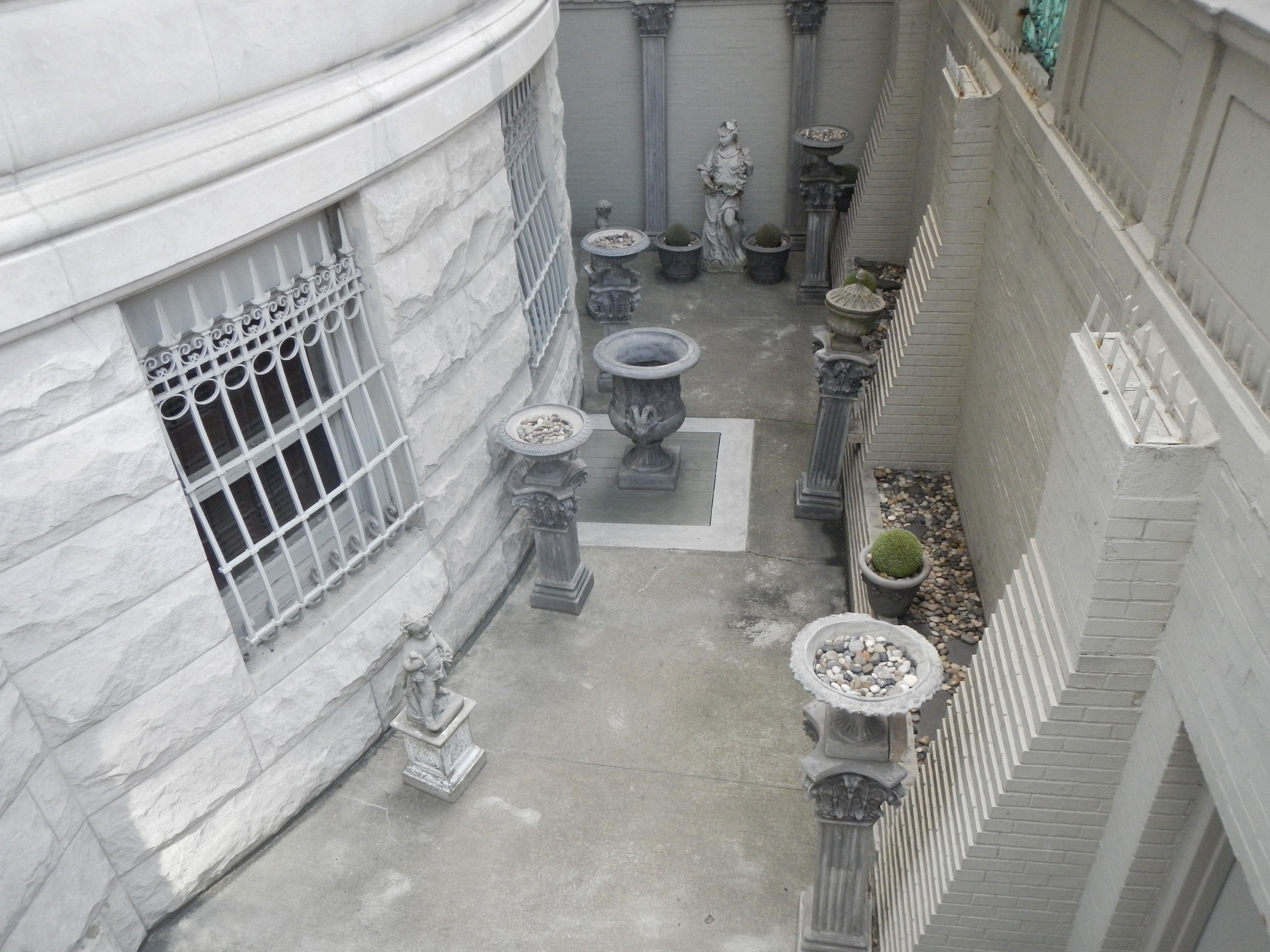
Sidewalk moat, 64th Street side

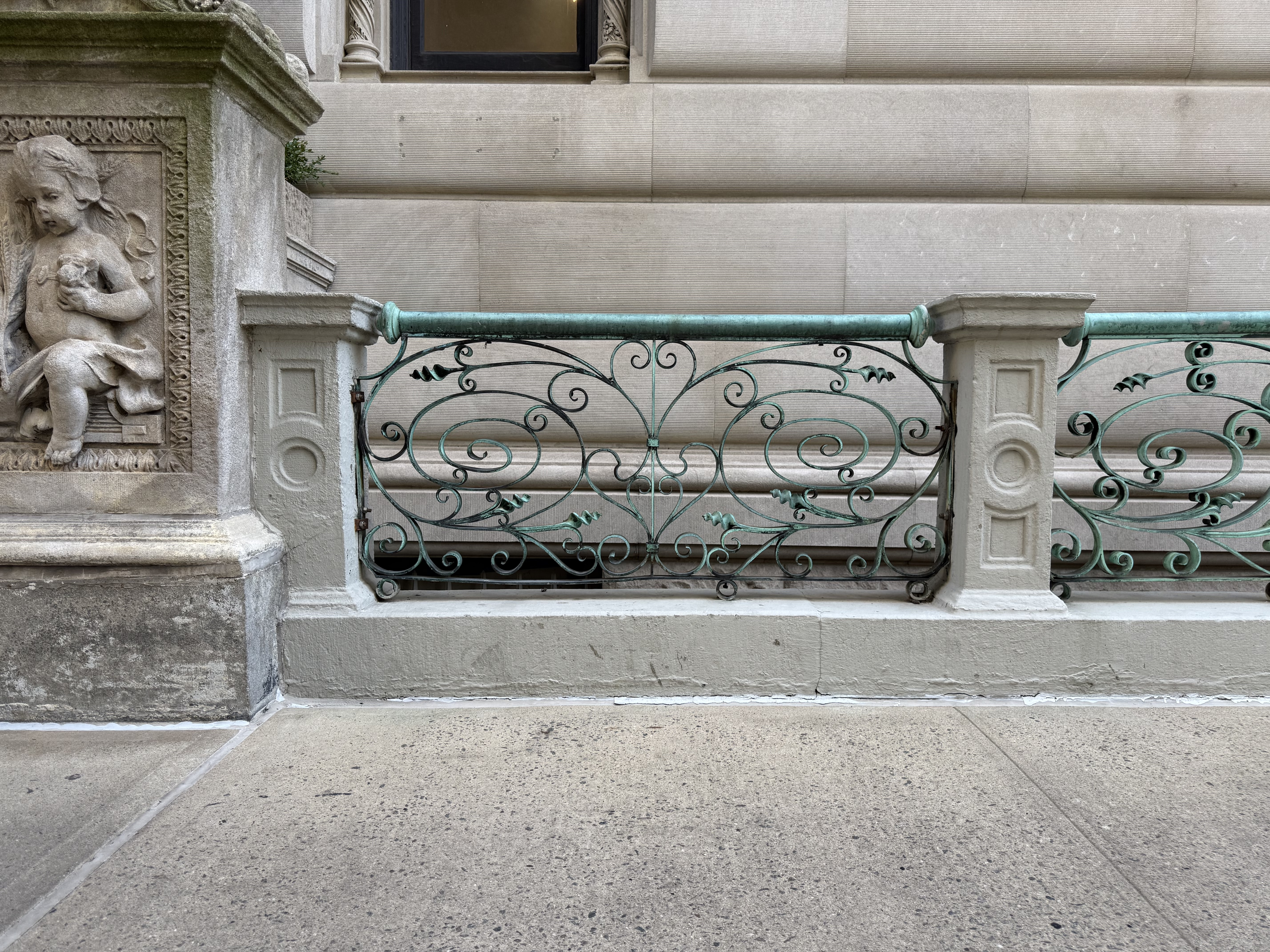
Sidewalk moat railing next to the main entry

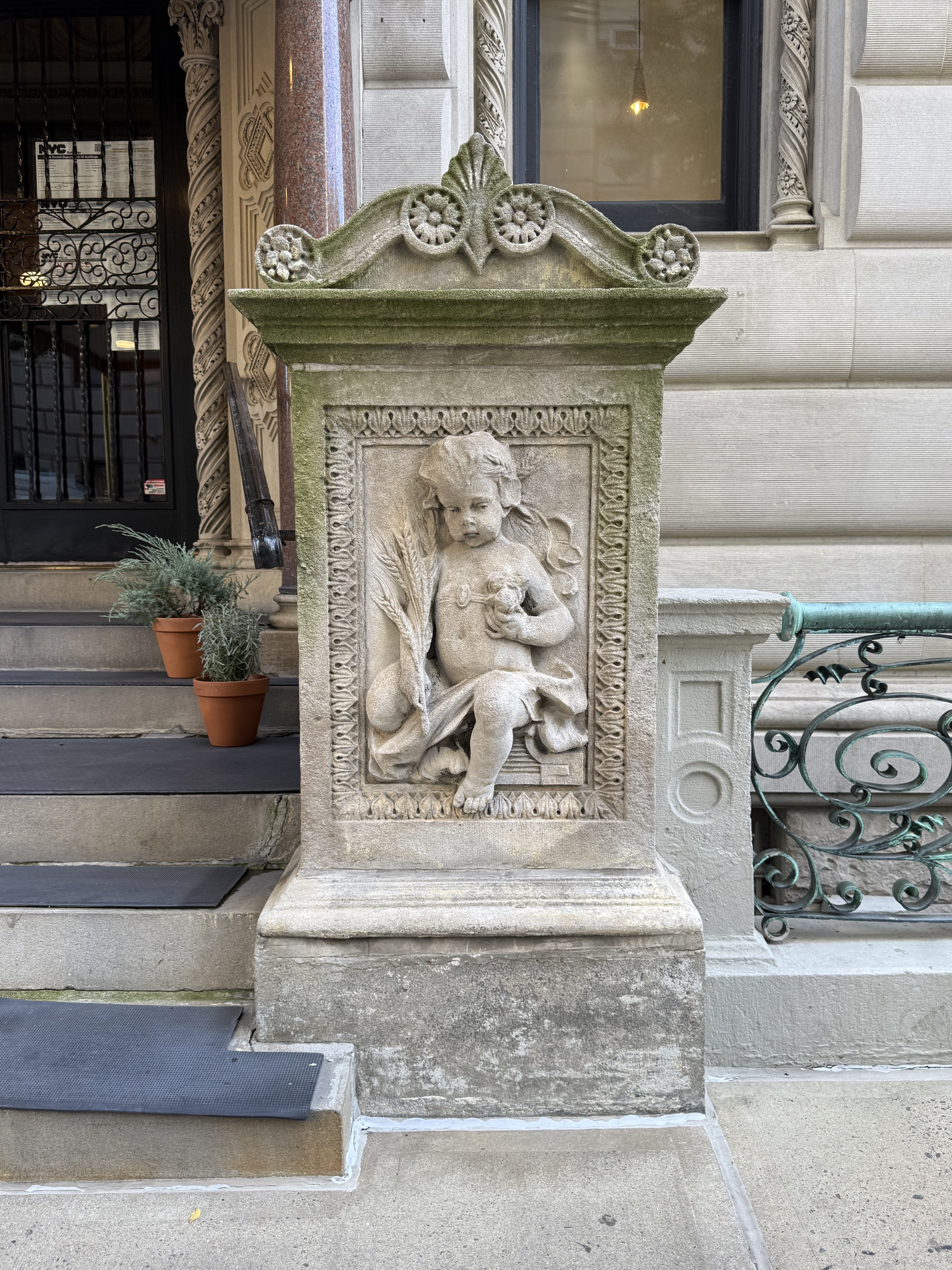
Carved stone pier at the main entry

== See also ==
- The Elms (Newport, Rhode Island), Berwind's summer mansion
