= Museum of American Illustration =

- The Museum of American Illustration and Exhibitions, established 1981 in New York City
- National Museum of American Illustration, established 1998 in Newport, Rhode Island
