= Jules Allard and Sons =

French Interior decoration firm

- Type: Private
- Industry: Home Furnishings, Interior design
- Founded: 1878
- Defunct: 1909
- Headquarters: Paris, France
- Number of locations: 3
- Key people: Célestin Allard, Jules Allard
- Products: Architectural fittings, decorative elements

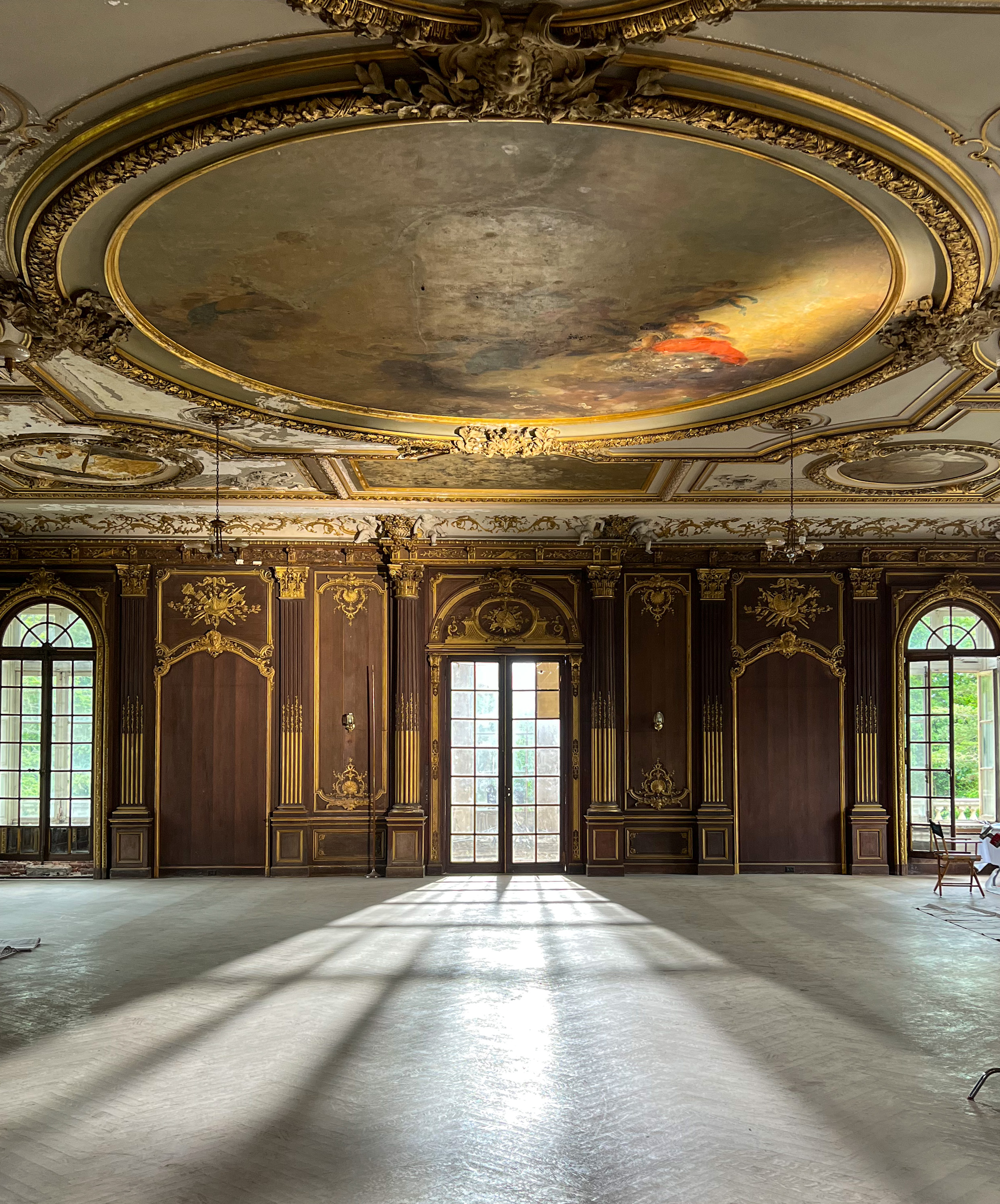
Ballroom at Lynnewood Hall

Jules Allard and Sons (or Jules Allard et Fils), was an interior design firm. Founded in 1878, Allard's origin reinforced in Paris reaffirmed the firm's credibility in composing "high style" French interiors for the American elite, at times employing authentic boiseries, mirrors and chimneypieces. Architectural fittings and sculpture were provided from the firm's ateliers, as well as furniture and upholstery, carpets, curtains and hangings. The firm opened a New York branch in 1885.

Allard, who employed, retained and collaborated with architects, had an arrangement with the designer Eugène Prignot, with whom he formed a partnership for the New York branch of his business. Prignot also provided designs for the London furniture makers Jackson and Graham; his prize-winning designs for elaborate draperies and curtains were exhibited at World's Fairs and published in engravings. Allard's Paris showrooms were in rue de Châteaudun. According to the 1895 London street directory the company, 'Jules Allard & Sons, Decorators' also had a branch in the heart of London's architectural quarter at No.9 Buckingham Street, Adelphi, just off the Strand.

The French salon supplied by Allard at the William K. Vanderbilt House at 660 Fifth Avenue helped launch the taste for French dix-huitième interiors in New York City. This room and what was called a "lady's room" in the house of William Henry Vanderbilt at 640 Fifth Avenue ensured the American reputation of Jules Allard's firm (founded in 1878), which traded in New York as Allard and Sons from 1885, becoming the pre-eminent source for French architectural interiors until the death of Jules Allard in 1907. The firm was subsequently absorbed by Lucien Alavoine and Company.

In the leading northeastern resort of Newport, Rhode Island alone, Allard and Sons worked on the interiors of Richard Morris Hunt's The Breakers. There they cooperated with the decorator Ogden Codman, Jr. who permitted AF to be incorporated into the painted designs of the Music Room ceiling; that room and the state dining room, were entirely constructed in Allard's Paris workshops, disassembled, and shipped across the Atlantic. At Hunt's Marble House Allard's name is connected with the Gothic Room and is to be found on the bronze figures reclining on the pedimented mantel in the Grand Salon. Elsewhere in Newport, at The Elms, Allard's name is cast in the bronze lion and crocodile group on the terrace; Allard worked also at Vernon Court. Allard et Fils were the favored decorators of the architect Horace Trumbauer and of Stanford White, whose own New York house in Gramercy Park was fitted out to his own designs, by Jules Allard and his son, Georges.

Beginning with the highly finished ink and watercolor presentation sketches for interiors that Allard's draughtsmen could deliver through an architect the Allard workshops, working either with sketches or specification drawings from architects, could extend old panelling or equally well design and execute new, and finish their carved and molded surfaces with gilding and decorative painting, done in-house. Accurate reproductions of Louis XV and Louis XVI seat furniture could be built, gilded and upholstered. Allard maintained close connections with textile workshops to provide appropriate silks and velvets for upholstery, window curtains and portières. The firm was dissolved shortly after the death of Jules Allard in 1907.

== Notable Commissions ==
Notable commissions included Lynnewood Hall, The Breakers, The Elms, Rosecliff, and The Marble House.
