= Russian Schoolroom =

1967 painting by Norman Rockwell

- Artist: Norman Rockwell
- Year: 1967
- Medium: Oil on canvas
- Dimensions: 40 cm × 93 cm (16 in × 37 in)
- Location: National Museum of American Illustration; Newport, Rhode Island, U.S.

Russian Schoolroom (1967), also known as The Russian Classroom and Russian Schoolchildren, is an oil on canvas painting created by American illustrator Norman Rockwell (1894–1978) and commissioned by Look magazine. It depicts Soviet (presumably Russian) schoolchildren in a classroom with a bust of Soviet leader Vladimir Lenin.

The painting is shown at the National Museum of American Illustration.

== Description ==
Russian Schoolroom depicts a group of seated and attentive Soviet schoolchildren looking towards the viewer's left, presumably at a teacher outside the visual frame. A bust of Vladimir Lenin with strewn flowers is, however, partially visible there. The children wear red Young Pioneer neckerchiefs and a part of Lenin's quote "Study, learn more, learn forever" visible on the wall behind them. One pupil on the right, however, looks away to the viewer's right, losing focus and finding something more interesting to see outdoors.

== Background ==
External image
- The Moscow school class photograph on which the painting is based.

Russian Schoolroom was published in the October 3, 1967, edition of Look as part of a series of articles on life in the Soviet Union. Rockwell had visited School No. 29 in Moscow where he drew puppy sketches on a chalkboard. Reference photos of the Moscow classroom with pupils, taken as a model for Rockwell's final painting, reveal that the inattentive pupil is actually paying close attention to the teacher, with eyes front. It has been suggested that in changing this detail, Rockwell slightly subverted the image to make a subtle political point in favor of non-conformity. Additional reference photos show Rockwell himself sitting in that student's seat, apparently demonstrating a distracted look, which the student then emulated.

== Theft and litigation ==
The painting was stolen during an exhibit at a small art gallery in Clayton, Missouri, in June 1973. In 1988, it turned up and was sold at an auction in New Orleans for about $70,000. Steven Spielberg bought the painting from Judy Goffman Cutler, a noted art dealer who specialized in American illustrators, in 1989 for $200,000. A member of his staff spotted the painting on an FBI web listing of stolen works of art and the authorities were immediately notified. By 2009, the painting was in the custody of the U.S. District Court in Las Vegas. The court decided in 2010 that the 1973 owner had been appropriately reimbursed and that the painting belonged to Cutler, who had by then traded it with Spielberg for another work; she subsequently added it to the collection on display at the National Museum of American Illustration, which she co-founded, in Newport, Rhode Island.
