= Judy Goffman Cutler =

American Art Dealer

Judy Goffman Cutler is an art dealer, art collector, co-founder and Director of the National Museum of American Illustration, and founder and Executive Director of the American Illustrators Gallery, NYC, the premier gallery showcasing major original artworks from the 'Golden Age of American Illustration'. The collection includes works by Norman Rockwell, Maxfield Parrish, Elizabeth Shippen Green, NC Wyeth, Howard Pyle, Jessie Willcox Smith, Howard Chandler Christy, JC Leyendecker, Violet Oakley, James Montgomery Flagg, and many other illustrators. Judy is the co-founder of The Alliance for Art and Architecture LLC. She has authored and co-authored over fifty exhibition catalogues and art books published by Bison Books/Crescent Books (Random House), Harry N. Abrams, and Pomegranate Artbooks.

== Early life ==
Cutler grew up in Woodbridge, Connecticut, and graduated from the University of Pennsylvania with a Bachelor of Arts in fine arts and American Civilization and a Masters of Arts degree in education.

== Career ==
Cutler began her career as an art dealer/ collector by recognizing the value of illustration as an integral part of our national heritage and its significant role in the fine arts spectrum. In the 1970s, she collected the original paintings of the greatest artists of the period commonly known as 'The Golden Age of Illustration.'

=== American Illustrators Gallery ===
In the 1970s, Cutler founded the American Illustrators Gallery in New York City, which features the finest original artworks of the greatest illustration artists and is the premier exhibitor, buyer and seller of American Illustration art. These renowned illustrators include Norman Rockwell, Maxfield Parrish, NC Wyeth, Howard Pyle and JC Leyendecker. Cutler supervises all appropriate conservation, provenance research, and presentation for each of the artworks.

=== The National Museum of American Illustration ===
In 1998, Judy Cutler founded the National Museum of American Illustration (NMAI), a nonprofit independent, educational, and aesthetic organization. It is located at Vernon Court (1898) in Newport, RI, a Beaux Arts 18th century French chateaux listed on the National Register of Historic Places and considered one of “the ten most beautiful mansions in America.”

The American Imagist Collection housed at the National Museum of American Illustration comprises the largest private collection of Norman Rockwell, N.C. Wyeth, J.C. Leyendecker, Charles Dana Gibson, Maxfield Parrish and many other major illustrators from the 'Golden Age of American Illustration.' The 'Golden Age" of American Illustration can be loosely defined as the art created between 1880 and 1945. Cutler describes her collection as "art that culturally and socially defined its own times within the confines of what was happening chronologically in the United States."

Robert Campbell, Arts Critic for the Boston Globe reviewed the NMAI as a must see for visitors to Newport: “It’s one of my favorite museums in New England, or anywhere for that matter, yet hardly anyone has heard of it… For anyone who loves the art of the American illustrators, this museum is a feast… it’s impossible not to be impressed by the command of craftsmanship… It’s fascinating to remember it or discover it, depending on your age, at Vernon Court.”

=== Other work ===
Judy Cutler is a co-founder of the American Civilization Foundation, a nonprofit organization established as an independent, educational and aesthetic organization created for the public enlightenment in art, architecture and architectural landscape projects.

The American Illustrators Gallery and the National Museum of American Illustration jointly organize travelling exhibitions to further promote the importance of American illustration artworks throughout the United States and abroad. Most notably, the exhibition Norman Rockwell's America… In England travelled to Dulwich Picture Gallery, England’s oldest public art museum, where it set attendance records and was heralded as "the best exhibition held in London in 2011". Norman Rockwell’s America subsequently travelled to the Birmingham Museum of Art, Birmingham, AL, where Gail Andrews, Executive Director, remarked: "It's not often that we do something that focuses on a single artist... with Norman Rockwell, there will be works from 1916 to 1969 that tell heartfelt narratives of American optimism, trust and enshrined values."

With her husband, she wrote J.C. Leyendecker: American Imagist, and has a major role in Coded, a documentary on Leyendecker.

== Personal life ==
She was previously married Alan M. Goffman, who owned the Alan M. Goffman Gallery in New York. They were the parents of Jennifer Paige Goffman, who married Jon Lambert Greenawalt Jr. in 1999.

After their divorce, she married Harvard graduate Laurence S. Cutler in 1995, who is an architect in Boston. Together, they bought Vernon Court in Newport, Rhode Island in 1998.
