= The Elms (Newport, Rhode Island) =

Historic house in Rhode Island, United States

- U.S. National Register of Historic Places
- U.S. National Historic Landmark
- U.S. National Historic Landmark District – Contributing property
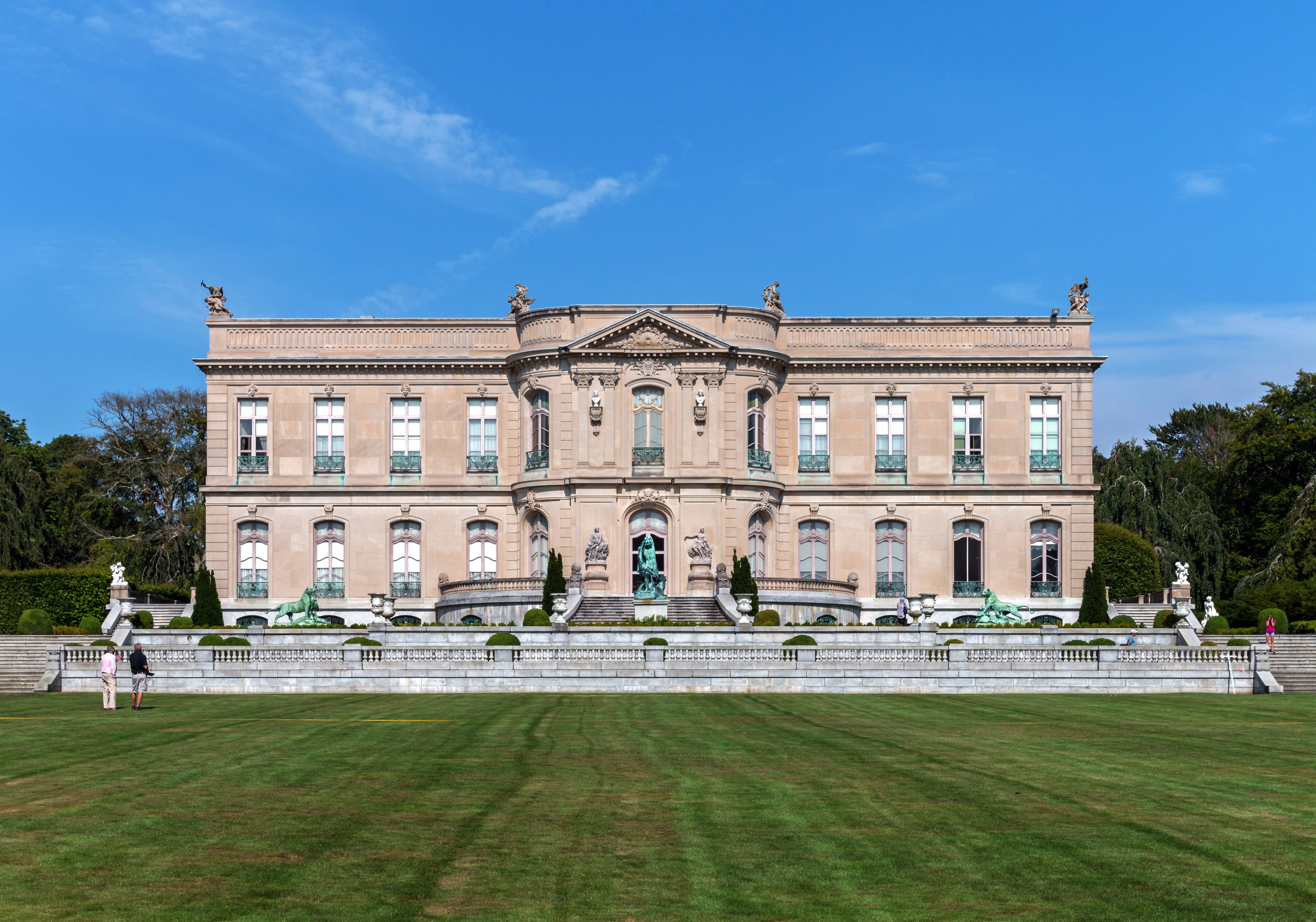
- The Elms, viewed from its great lawn

- Location within Rhode Island Location within the United States
- Location: 367 Bellevue Avenue, Newport, Rhode Island, U.S.
- Coordinates: 41°28′40″N 71°18′32″W
- Built: 1901
- Architect: Horace Trumbauer
- Architectural style: Classical Revival
- Part of: Bellevue Avenue Historic District (ID72000023)
- NRHP reference No.: 71000021

Significant dates
- Added to NRHP: September 10, 1971
- Designated NHL: June 19, 1996
- Designated NHLDCP: December 8, 1972

The Elms is a large mansion (sometimes facetiously called a "summer cottage") located at 367 Bellevue Avenue, Newport, Rhode Island, completed in 1901. The architect Horace Trumbauer (1868–1938) designed it for the coal baron Edward Julius Berwind (1848–1936), taking inspiration from the 18th century Château d'Asnières in Asnières-sur-Seine, France. C. H. Miller and E. W. Bowditch, working closely with Trumbauer, designed the gardens and landscape. The Preservation Society of Newport County purchased The Elms in 1962, and opened the house to the public. The Elms was added to the National Register of Historic Places in 1971, and designated a National Historic Landmark in 1996.

== Estate ==
=== House ===
The Elms was constructed from 1899 to 1901 and cost approximately 1.5 million dollars to build. Like most Newport houses of the Gilded Age, the house was built with non-combustible materials: the house was built around a structural steel frame; the interior partitions, plaster over terra cotta blocks, sit on reinforced concrete floor slabs; the exterior walls are made of brick masonry and clad with limestone.

On the main floor, the principal axis leads from the eastern entrance porch, into an entrance hall with a grand staircase and a marble floor, then into the ballroom, and then out to the garden beyond. The wing to the south contains a dining room, breakfast room, and serving pantry (the kitchens were in the basement), while the wing to the north contains a drawing room, library, and conservatory.

The second floor contains bedrooms for the family and guests as well as a private sitting room. The third floor contains bedrooms for the indoor servants.

=== Grounds ===
In keeping with the French architecture of the house, the grounds of The Elms, among the best in Newport, were designed in French eighteenth-century taste and include a sunken garden. The original American elms having succumbed to Dutch elm disease, the striking shade trees are now weeping beeches.

=== Ancillary buildings ===
Trumbauer built a large carriage house and stables on the edge of the property, with apartments above for the gardners and stable hands. in 1910, after the Berwind family began using automobiles, the carriage house and stables were replaced by a new garage, clad in limestone, 125-foot (38 m) long by 70-foot (21 m) deep, one of the largest private garages in America, with a central indoor track, and two gasoline tanks.

When automobiles replaced horse-drawn carriages, the Berwind's head coachman became the chauffeur, but because he could not learn to back out of the garage, an automobile turntable had to be installed.

== Inspiration ==
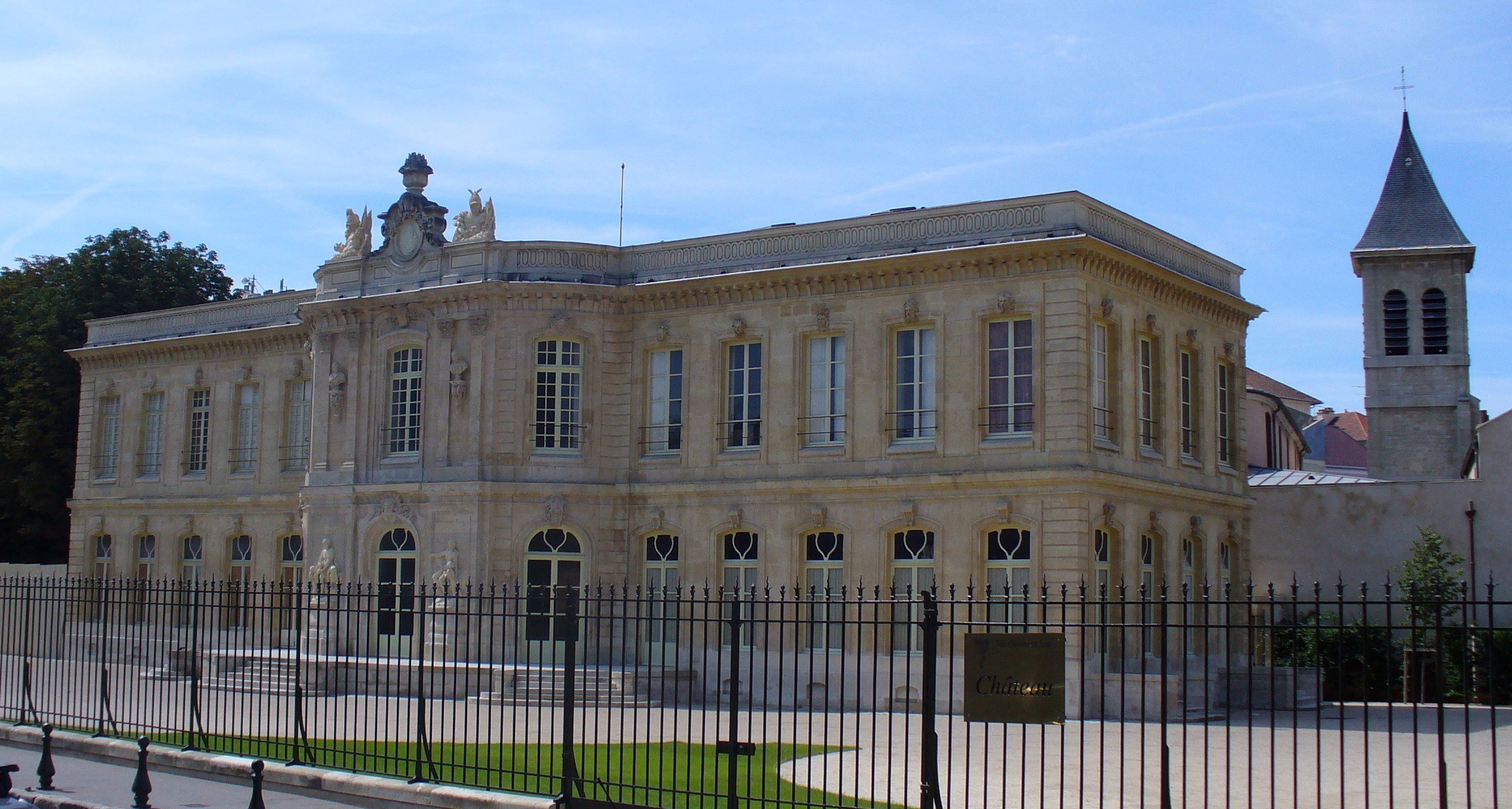
Château d'Asnières – garden façade.

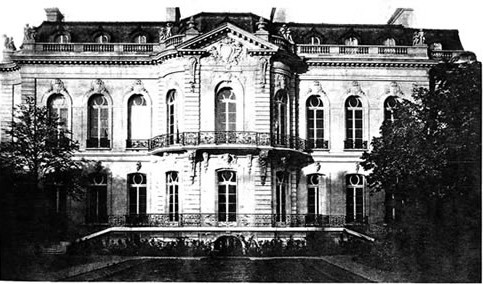
Hôtel Porgès – garden façade.

The Elms is considered to be a reinterpretation of the Château d'Asnières, an 18th century house in the town of Asnières-sur-Seine in Hauts-de-Seine, France. Nevertheless, it is not a replica; there are significant differences: the flanking sections of château d'Asnières are five bays wide, whereas and those at Trumbauer's house are four bays wide. The balustrade at The Elms is taller, but simpler in detail. Furthermore, the pediment on Trumbauer's garden facade is likely a variation of the pediment at Hôtel Porgès, 18 avenue Montaigne in Paris, built in 1892 by the architect Ernest Sanson. There is no pediment at Château d'Asnières.

== History ==
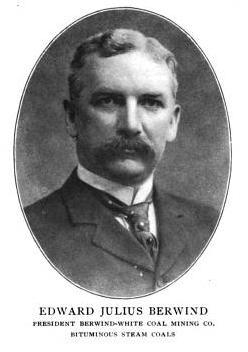
Edward Julius Berwind.

The Berwind family began spending summers in Newport in the 1890s. By 1898, it was clear that their original property (a small traditional beach cottage) was too small for the grand parties the Berwinds were having, and so they had the place torn down. Berwind hired Horace Trumbauer to build a much larger house, better fitting his status. Like many of the grandest summer residents of Newport, Edward Berwind was "new money" (his parents were middle-class German immigrants); by 1900 his friends included Theodore Roosevelt and Kaiser Wilhelm II of Germany as well as many high-ranking government leaders from Europe and America. At this time Berwind was hailed as "one of the 58 men who rule America", making him one of Newport's most important summer residents.

Berwind was interested in technology, and The Elms was one of the first houses in America to be wired for electricity with no form of backup system. The house also included one of the first electrical ice makers. It was one of the most sophisticated houses of the time. When The Elms opened in 1901 the Berwinds held a huge party.

During the next 20 years, Berwind's wife, Sarah, would spend the summers there, the season being from July 4 to the end of August; Berwind would come out only on weekends, for his coal-mining interests kept him in New York during the week (where Berwind and his wife lived in a similarly grand house at the corner of Fifth Avenue and East 64th Street). Though the Berwinds had no children, their nephews and nieces would come out to visit on a regular basis.

On January 5, 1922, Mrs. Berwind died, and Edward asked his youngest sister Julia A. Berwind to move in and become the hostess of The Elms. In 1936, when he died, he willed the house to Julia, who, not being interested in technology, continued to run the house in the same way for the next twenty five years: washers and dryers were never installed at the Elms. Julia was well known in Newport. She would invite children from the nearby Fifth Ward (a working-class immigrant neighborhood) to the estate for milk and cookies. She had a love for cars and would drive around Newport every day in one of her luxury cars. This was somewhat shocking to the rest of Newport society, where it was considered unladylike for women to drive themselves. It was rumored that her social secretary would perform the "white glove test" to make sure there was no dust on the steering wheel before Julia got into the driver's seat.

== Preservation ==
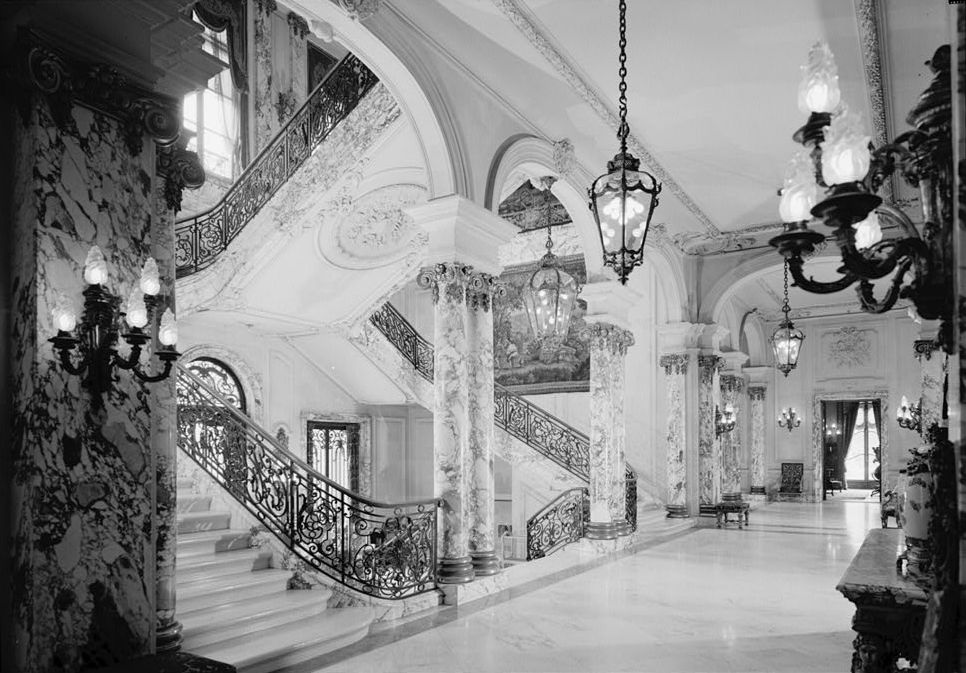
Staircase and Entrance Hall

In 1961 when Julia Berwind died, The Elms was one of the last Newport cottages to be run in the fashion of the Gilded Age: forty servants were on staff, and Miss Berwind's social season remained at six weeks. Childless, Julia Berwind willed the estate to a nephew, who did not want it and fruitlessly tried to pass The Elms to someone else in the family. Finally the family auctioned off the contents of the estate and sold the property to a developer who wanted to tear it down. In 1962, just weeks before its date with the wrecking ball, The Elms was purchased by the Preservation Society of Newport County for $116,000. The price included the property along with adjacent guest houses. Since then, the house has been open to the public for tours. The house was listed on the National Register of Historic Places in 1971, and was designated a National Historic Landmark in 1996.

In addition to a self-guided audio tour, The Elms offers a Servant Life Tour, which brings guests to the basement to view the coal-fired furnaces and the tunnel from which the coal is brought into the basement from a nearby street. The tour shows the lengths to which Mr. Berwind went to keep the servants out of view from guests on all floors of the mansion. Visitors on the Servant Life Tour view the laundry room, steamer trunk storage area, the giant circuit breaker box, ice-makers, galley, and wine cellar below the main floor, and climb the service staircase to the servants' quarters on the third floor. The tour then proceeds out on the level tiled roof and a small aluminum platform, with a view of the rear lawn, shade trees and gardens, and the vista of Newport harbor in the distance.

== See also ==
- List of Gilded Age mansions
- List of National Historic Landmarks in Rhode Island
- National Register of Historic Places listings in Newport County, Rhode Island
- Edward J. Berwind House

== Images ==
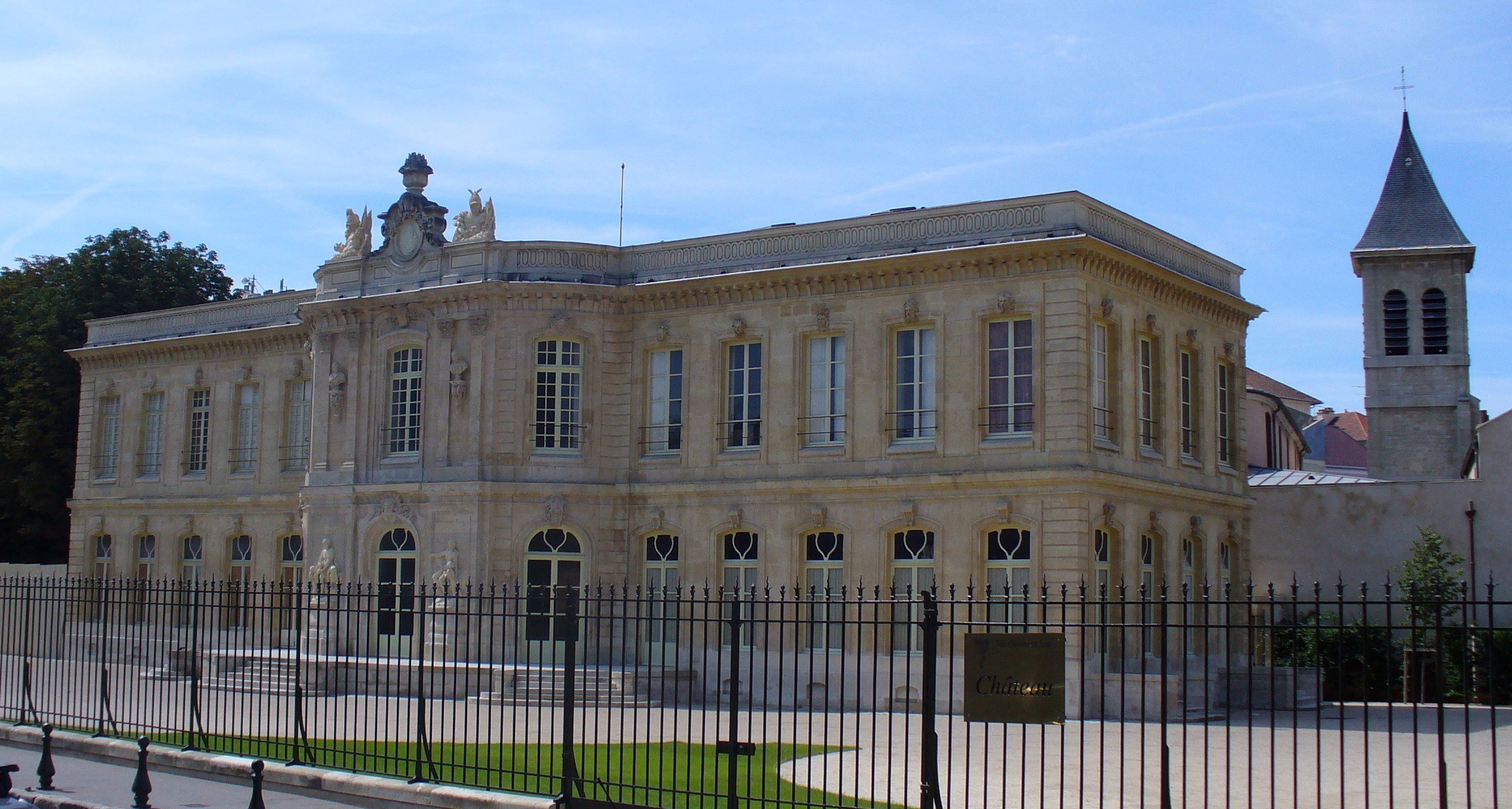
Château d'Asnières in France

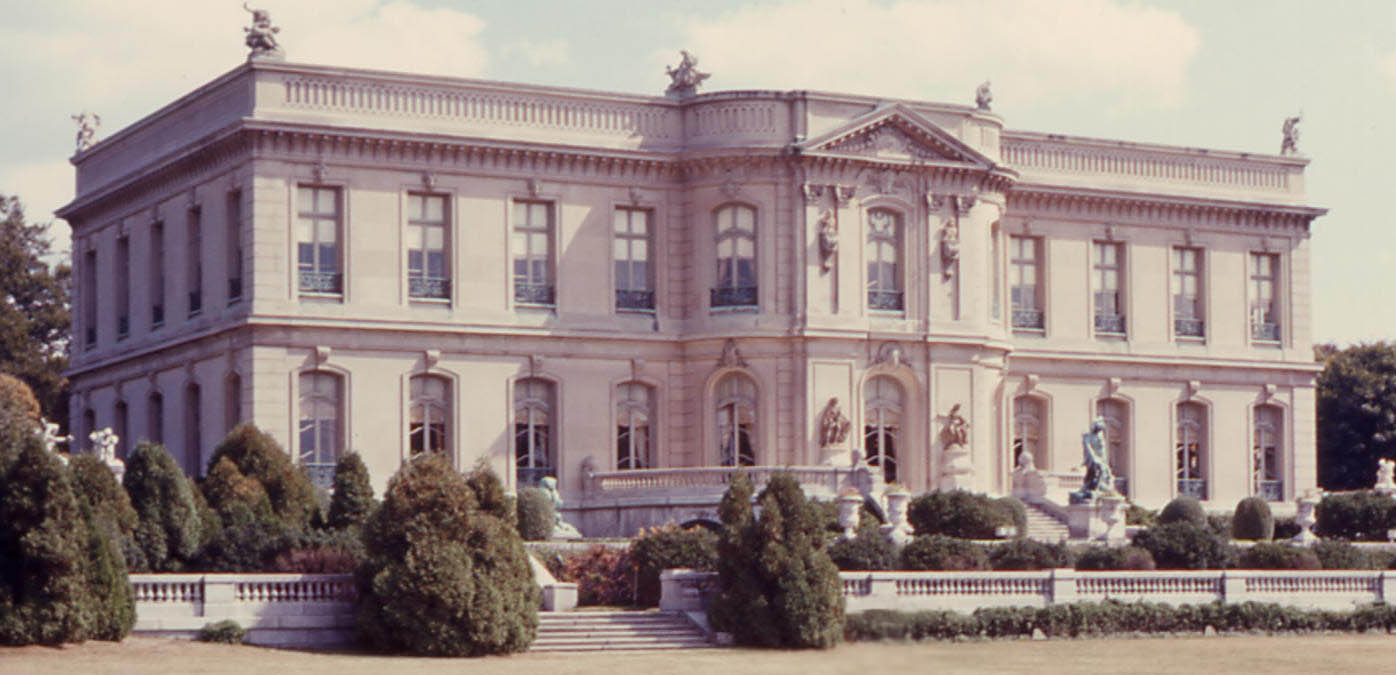
The mansion in 1968

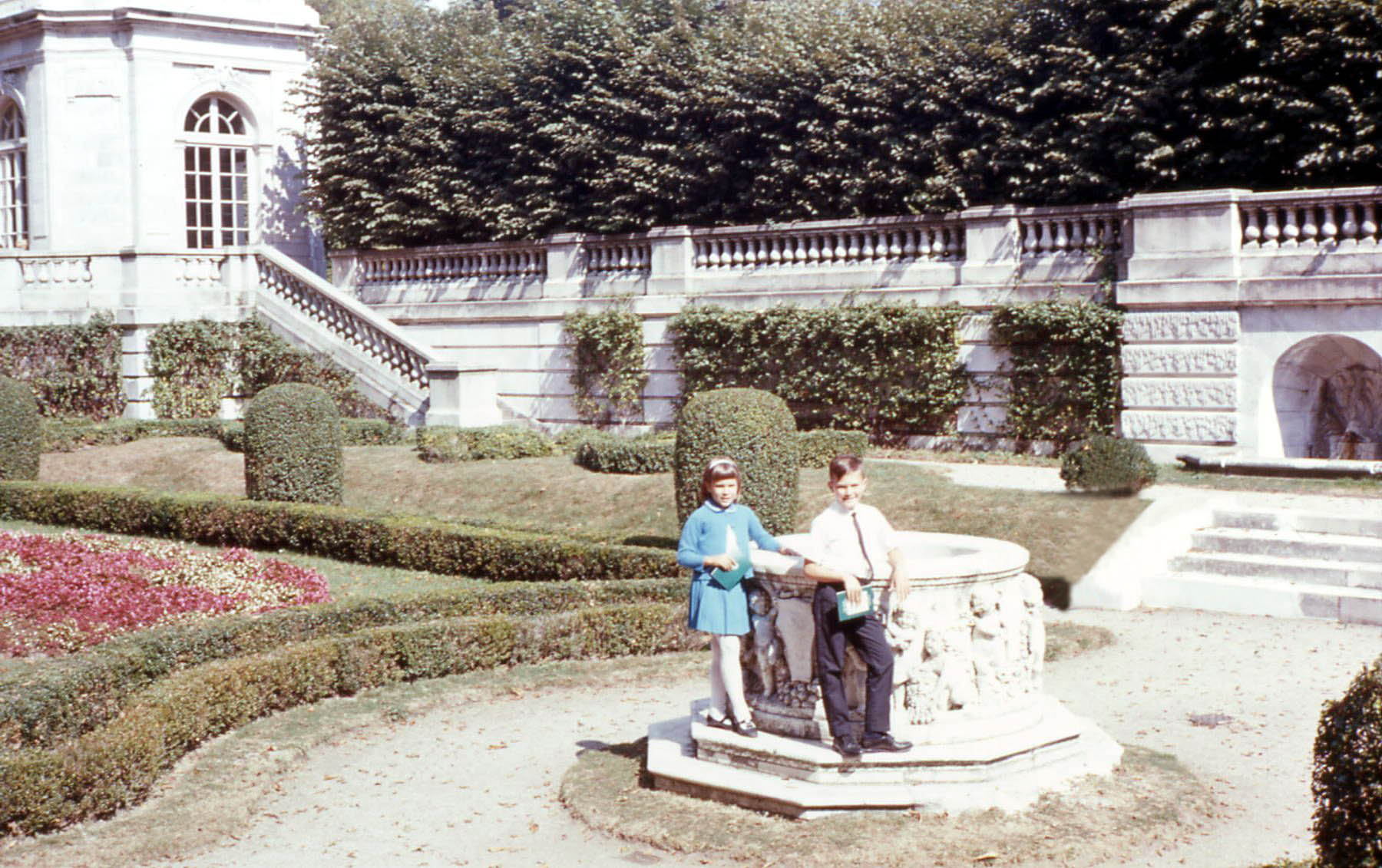
Gardens of the mansion, 1968

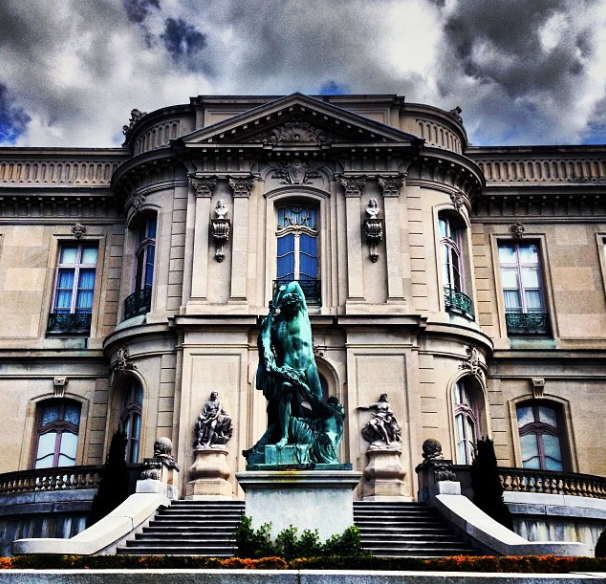
Statue behind the mansion.

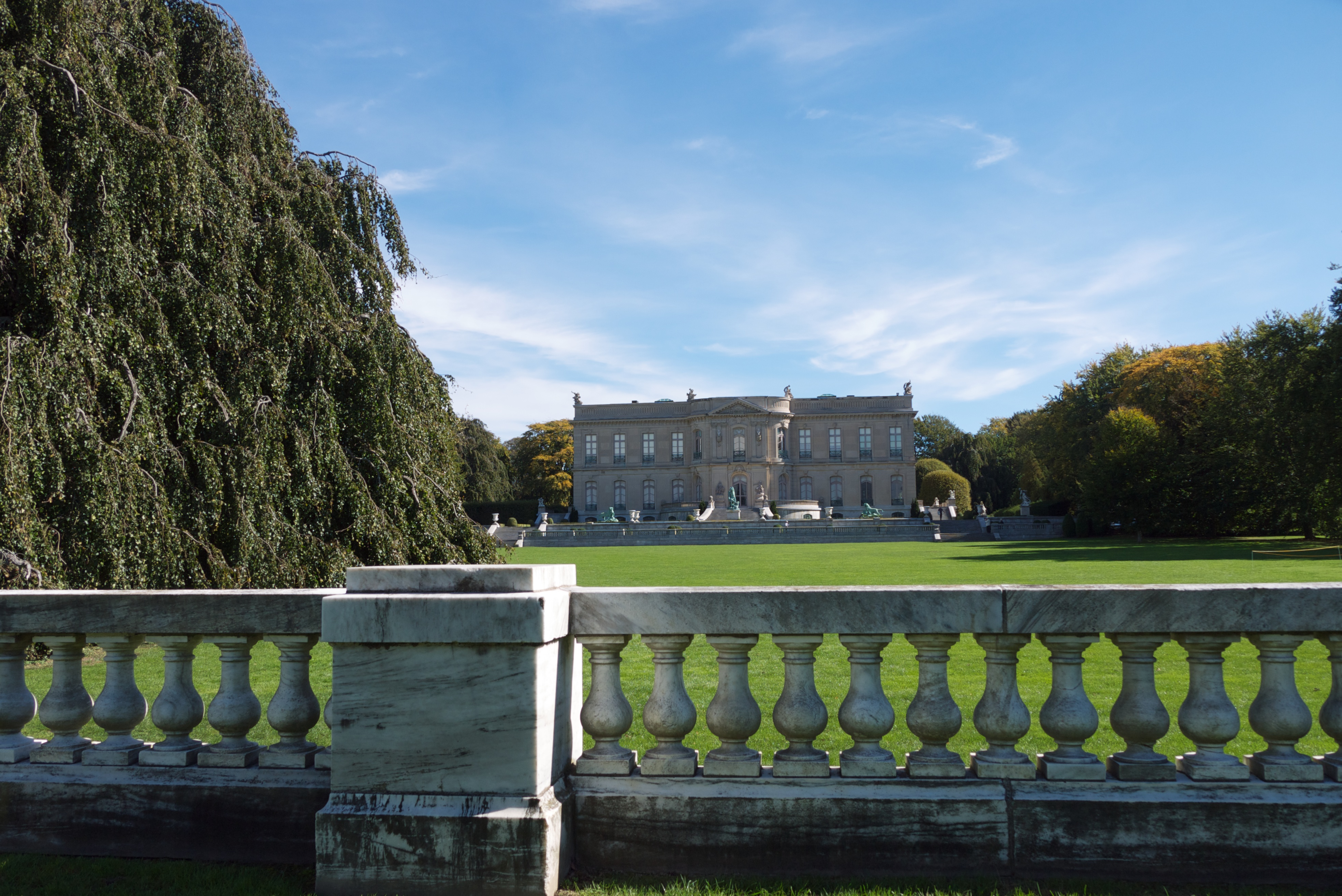
View of mansion from the grounds.

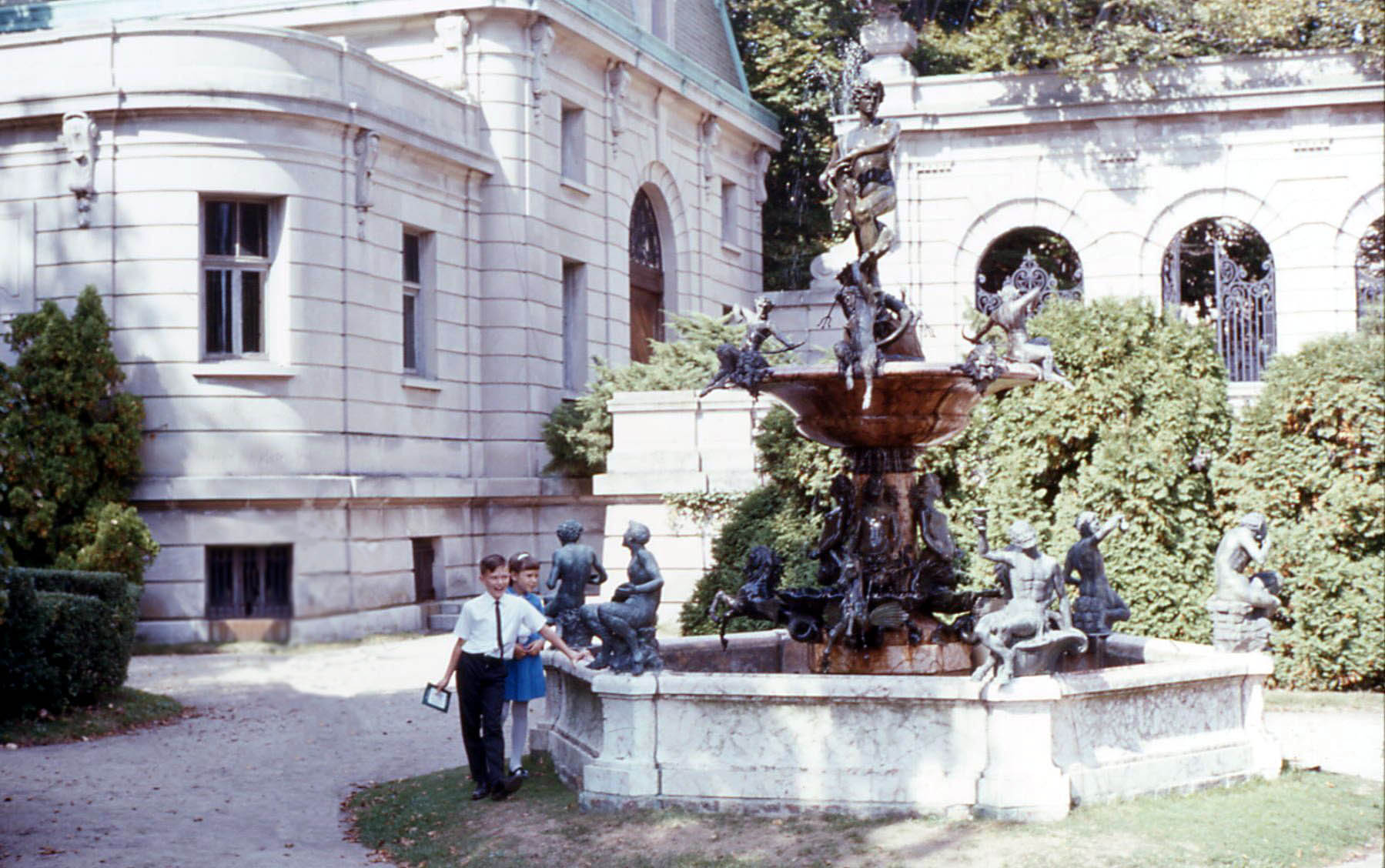
Fountain outside mansion

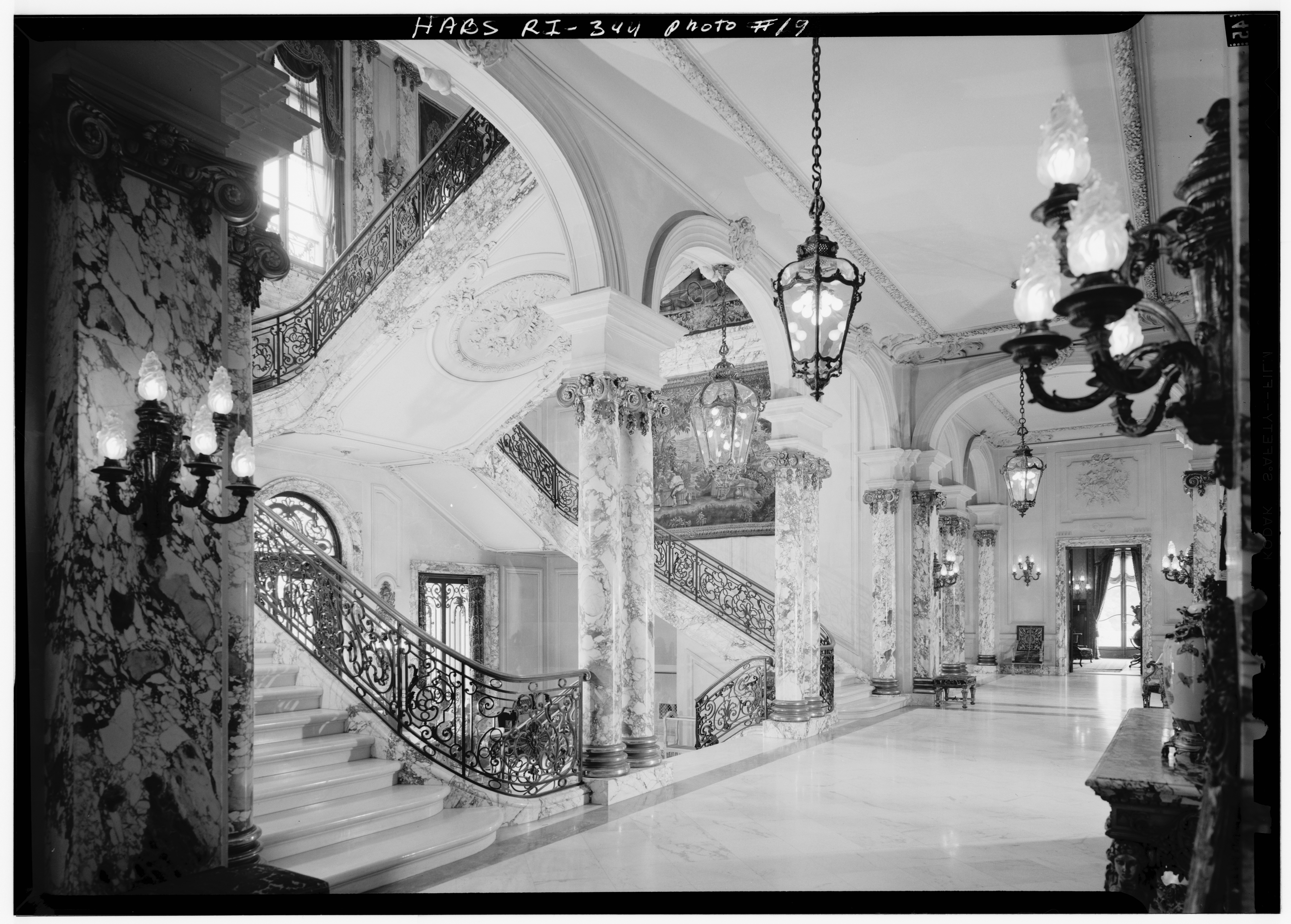
Staircase and entrance hall

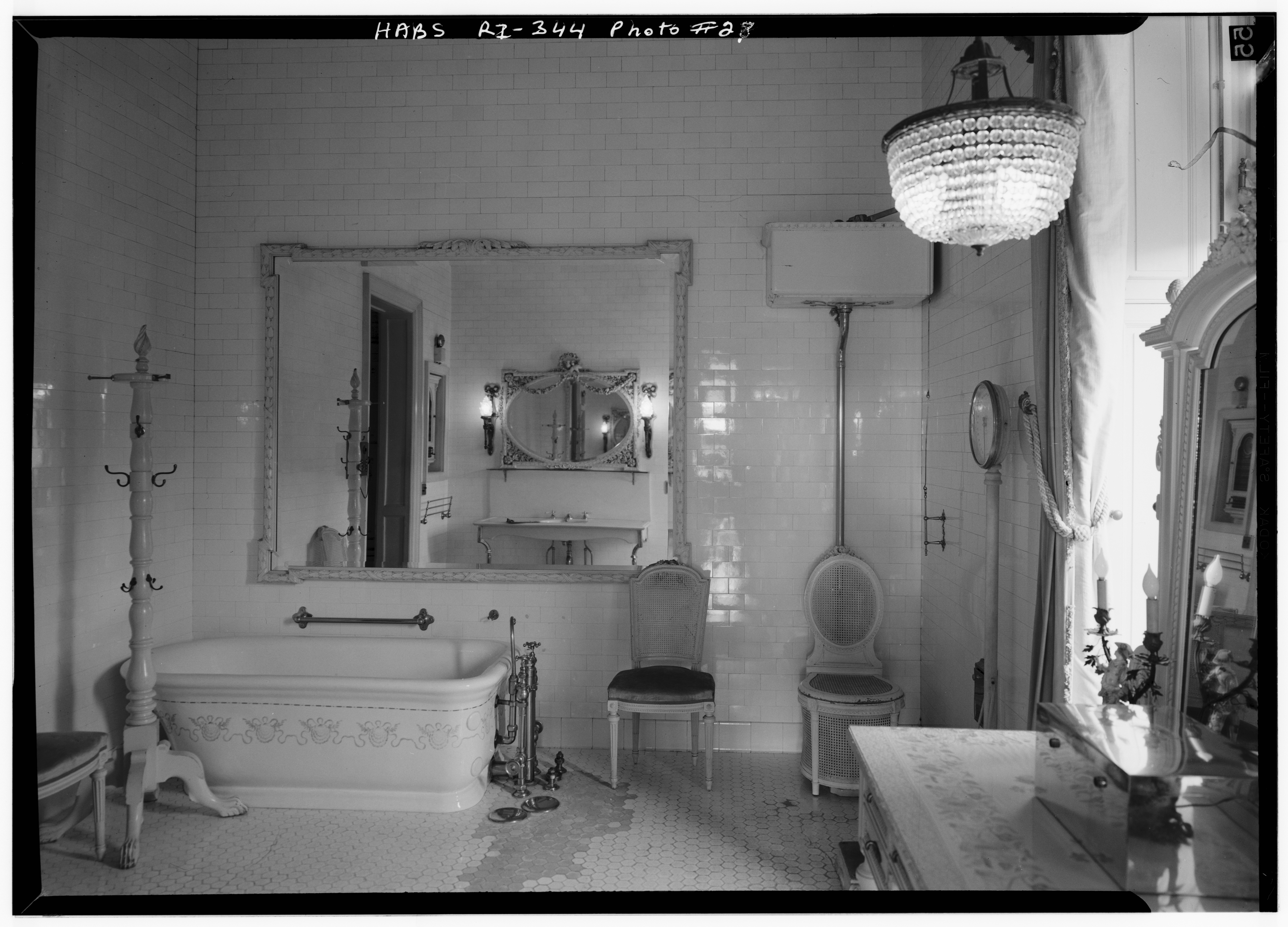
Mrs. Berwind's bathroom

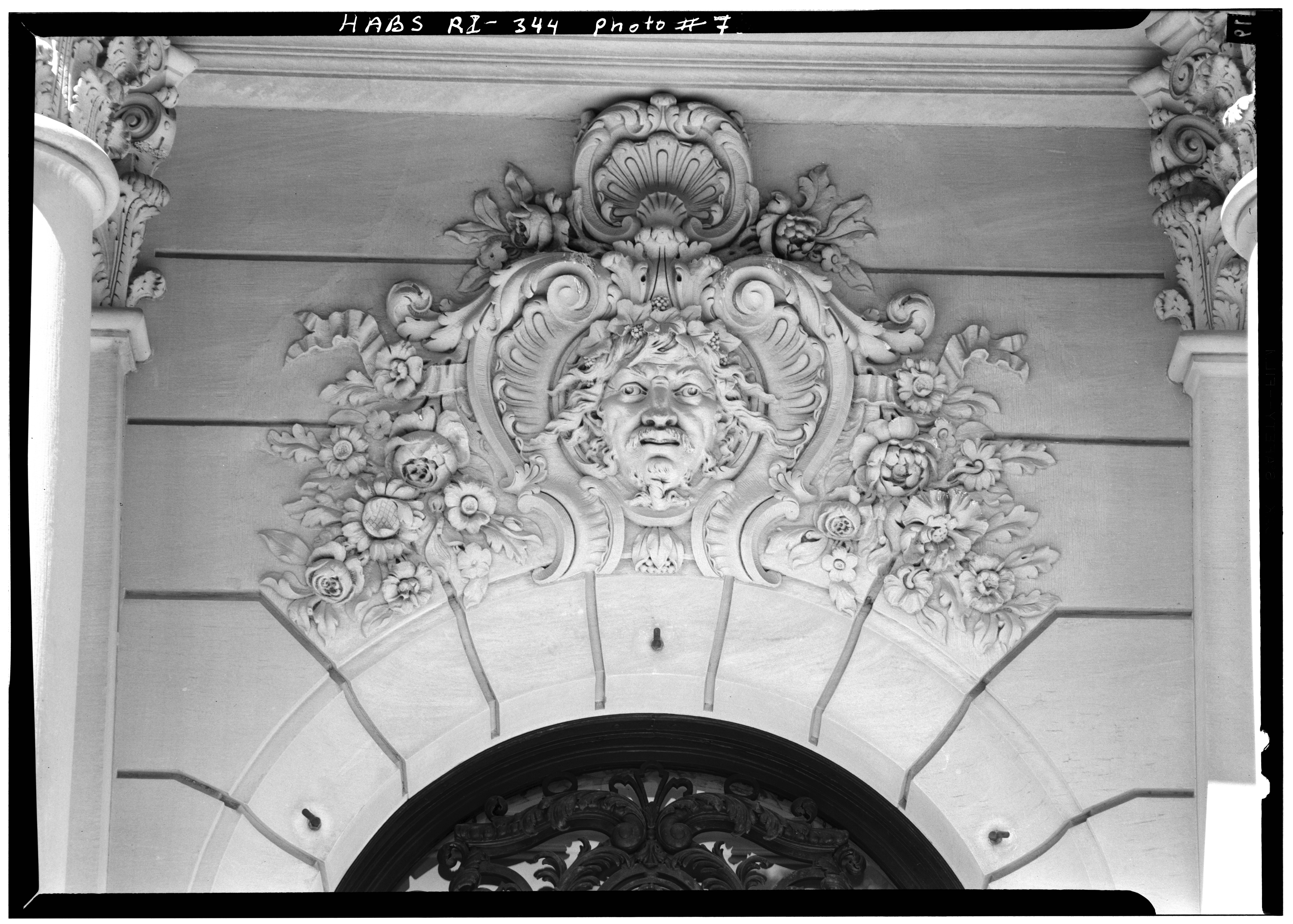
Carving above central entrance portal

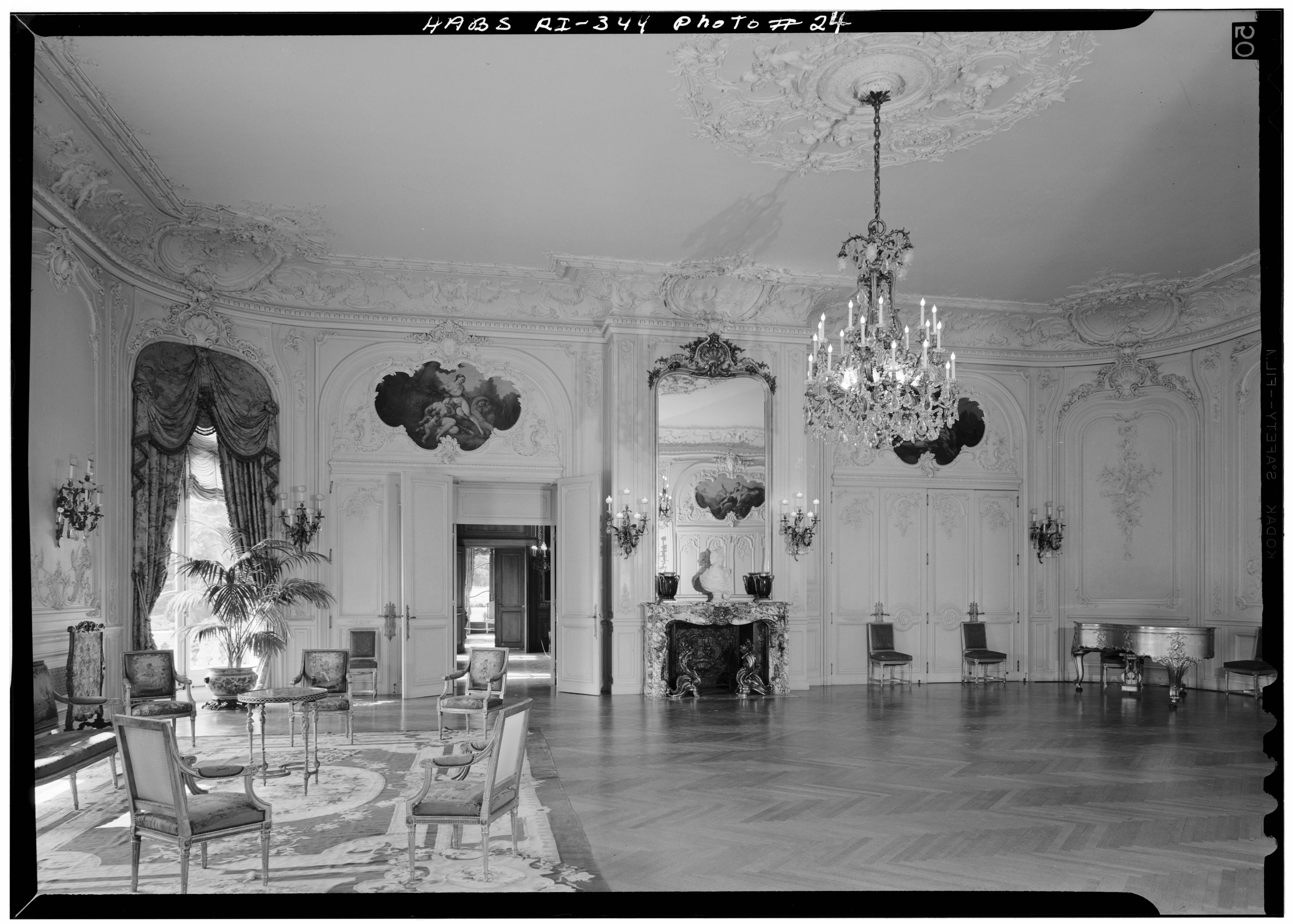
Ballroom

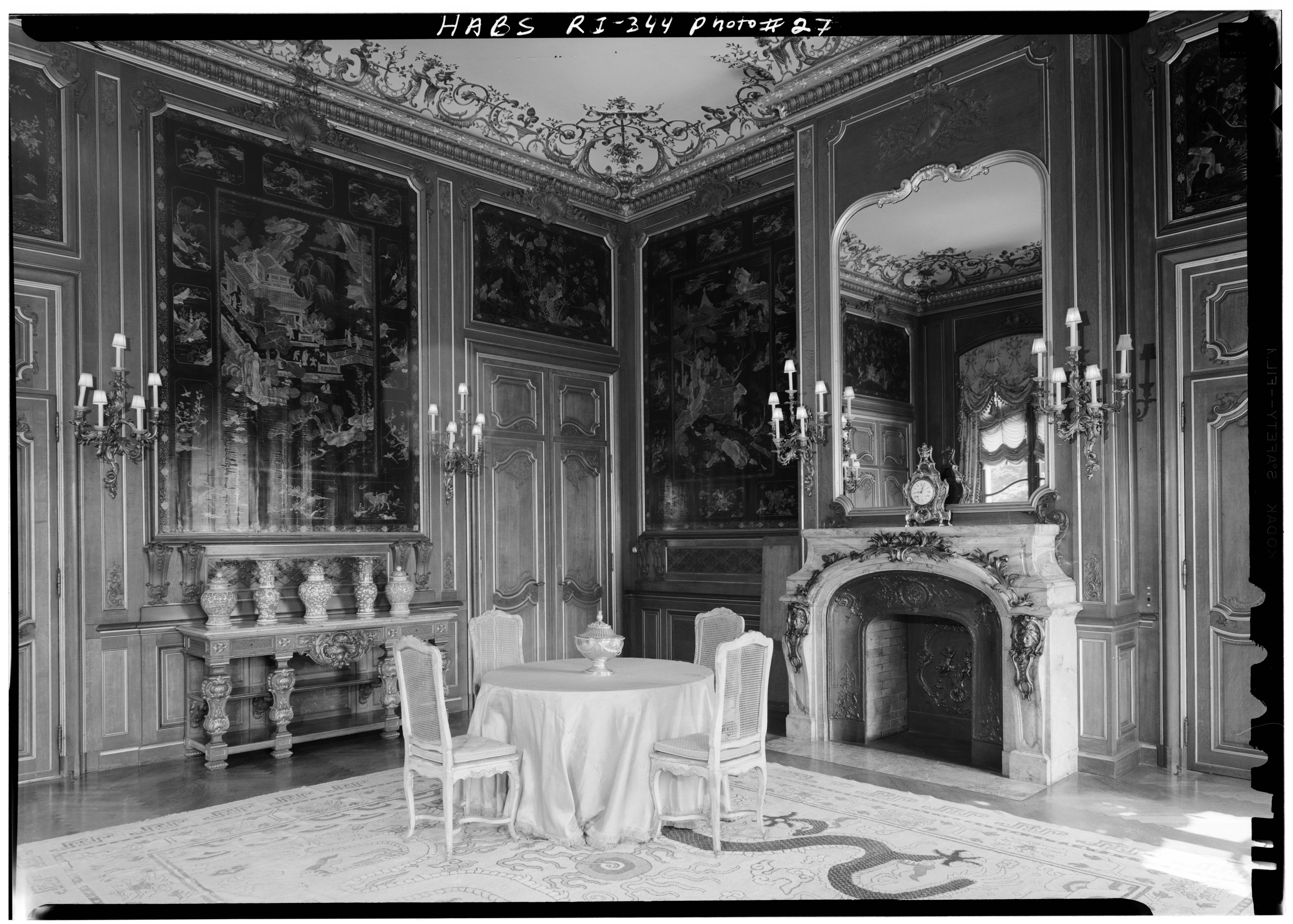
Breakfast room

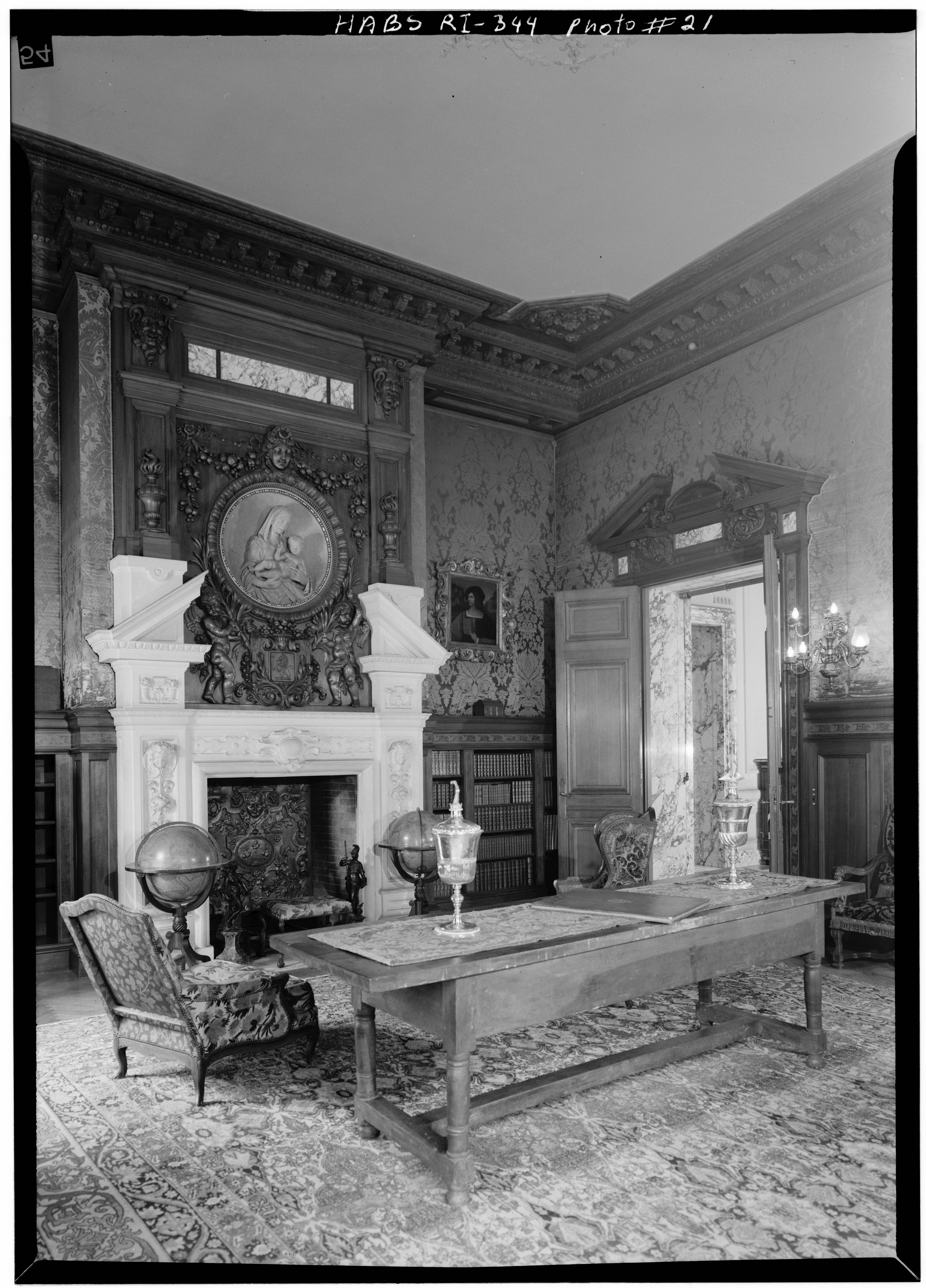
Library

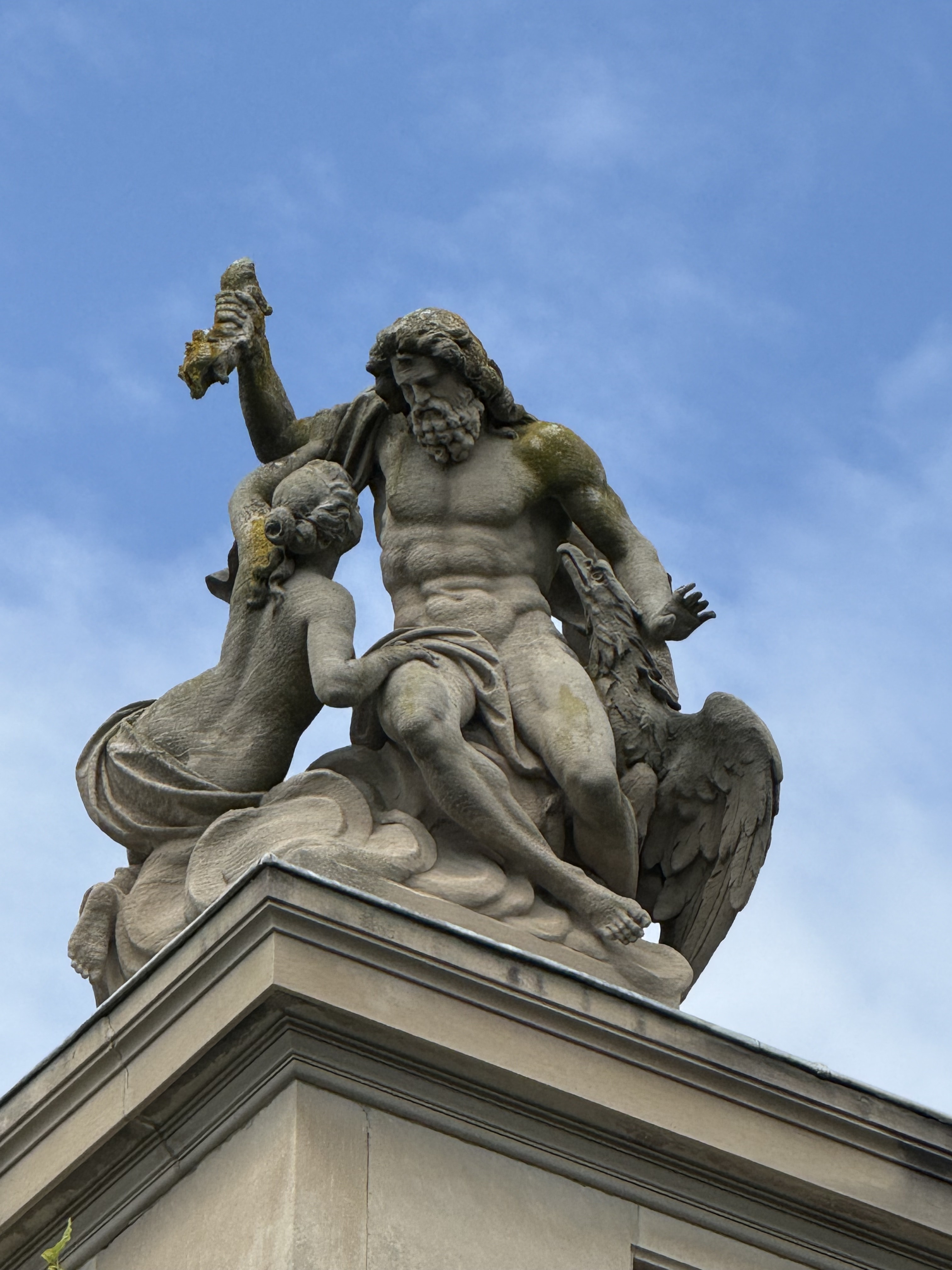
Parapet sculpture of Zeus, Thetis, and an eagle at the southeast corner, 2025

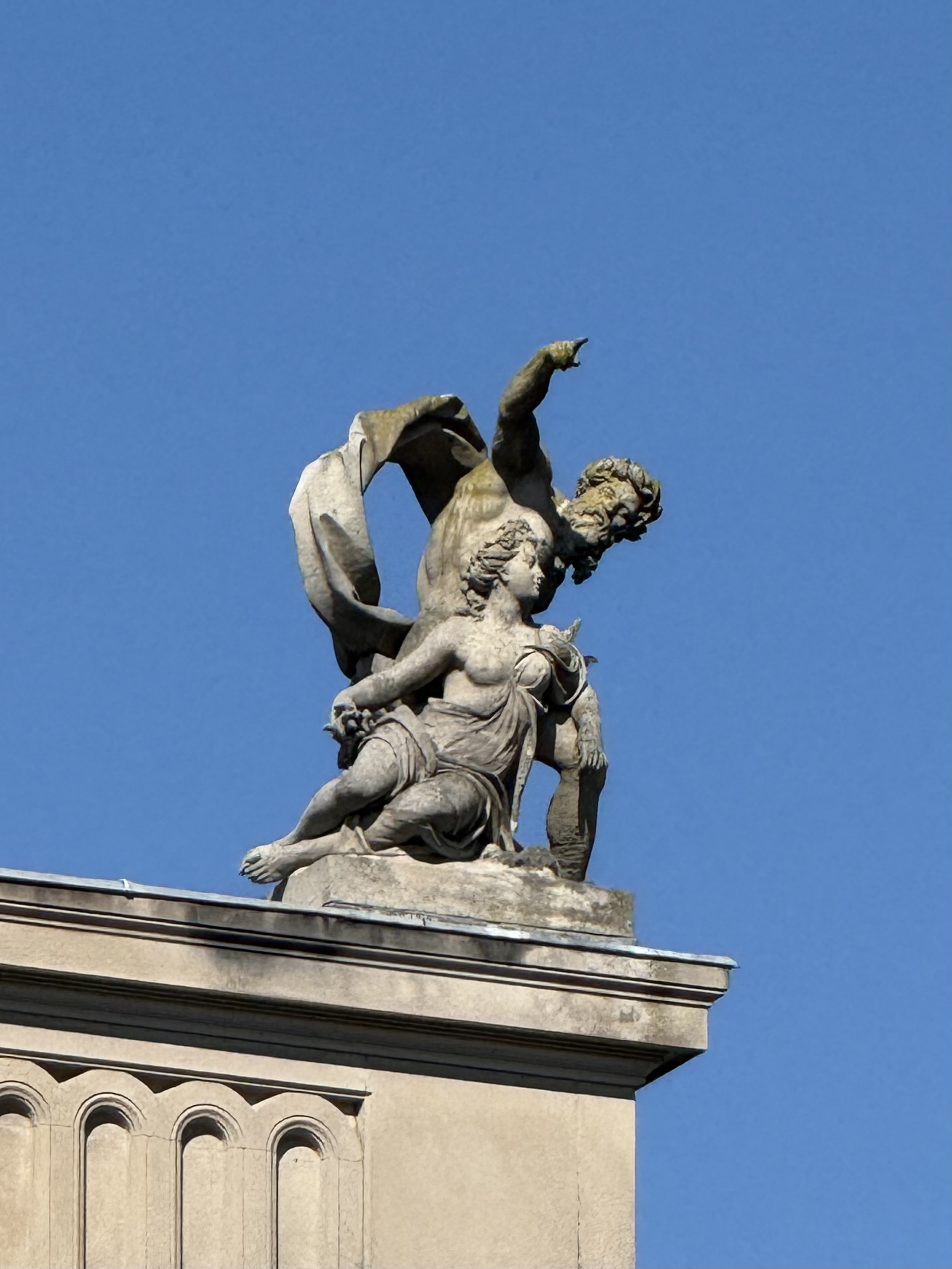
Parapet sculpture at the northeast corner, 2025

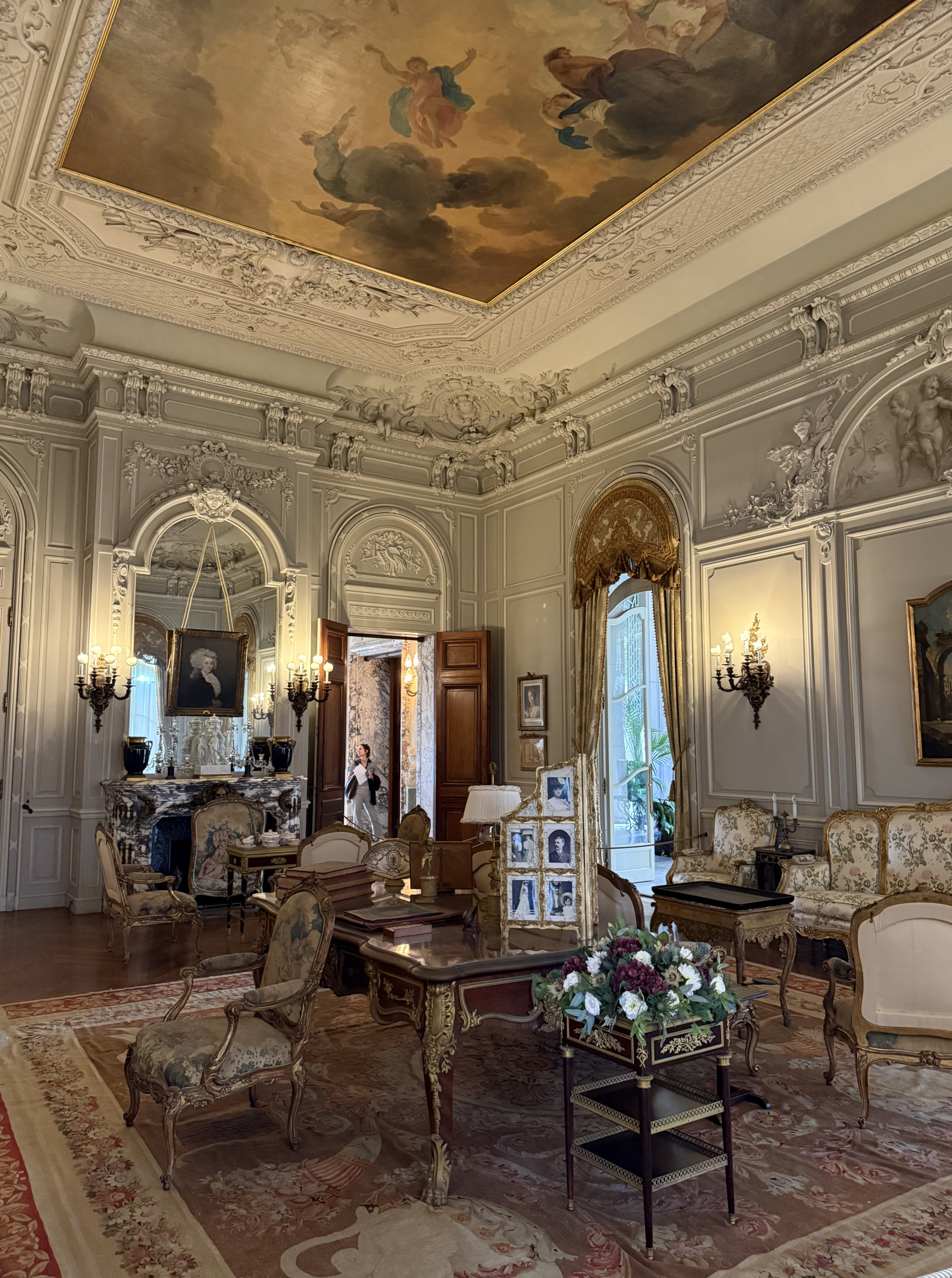
Interior view of the drawing room facing southeast, 2025

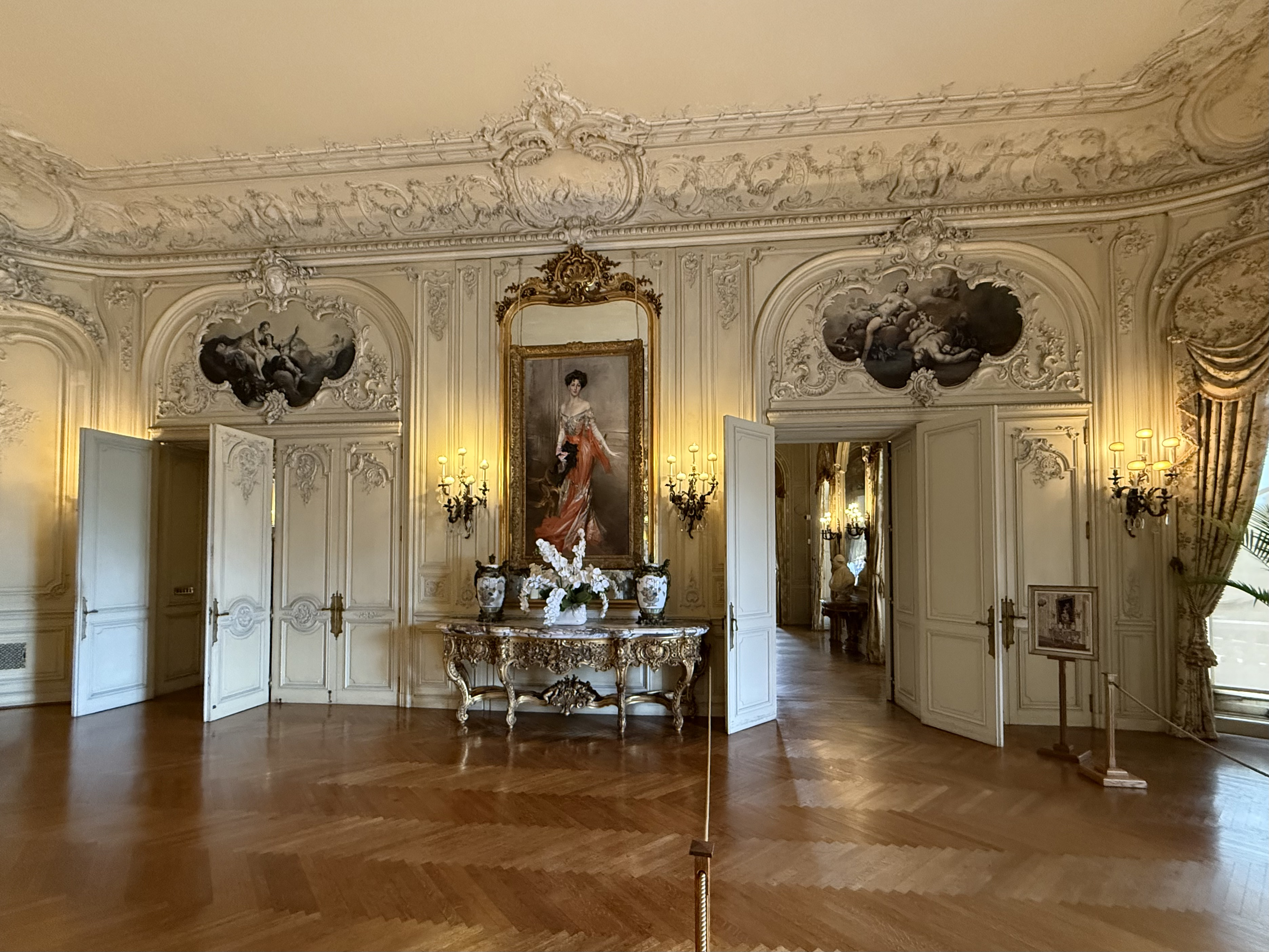
Interior view of the ballroom facing south, 2025

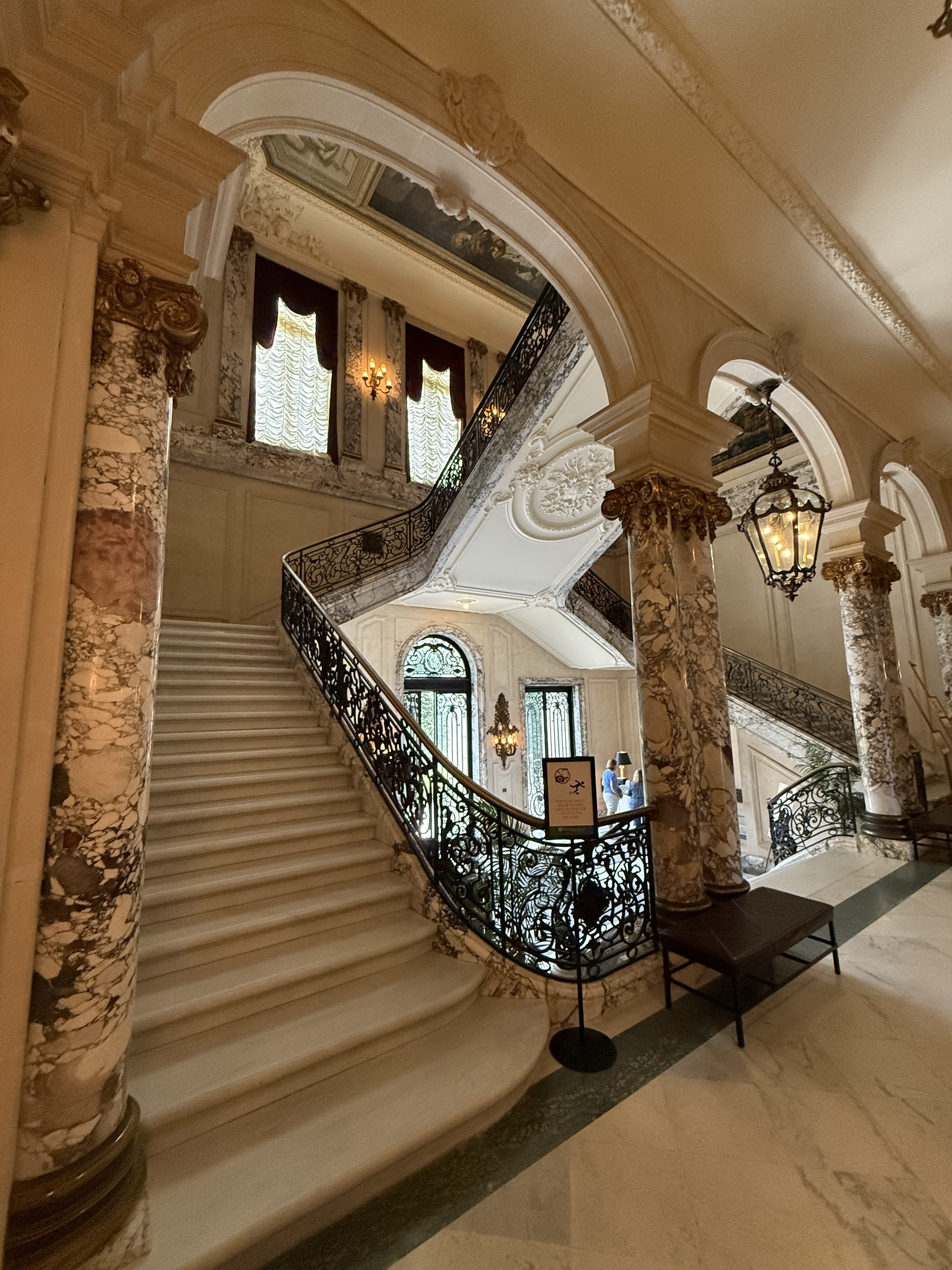
View of the main stair at the first floor, facing southeast, 2025

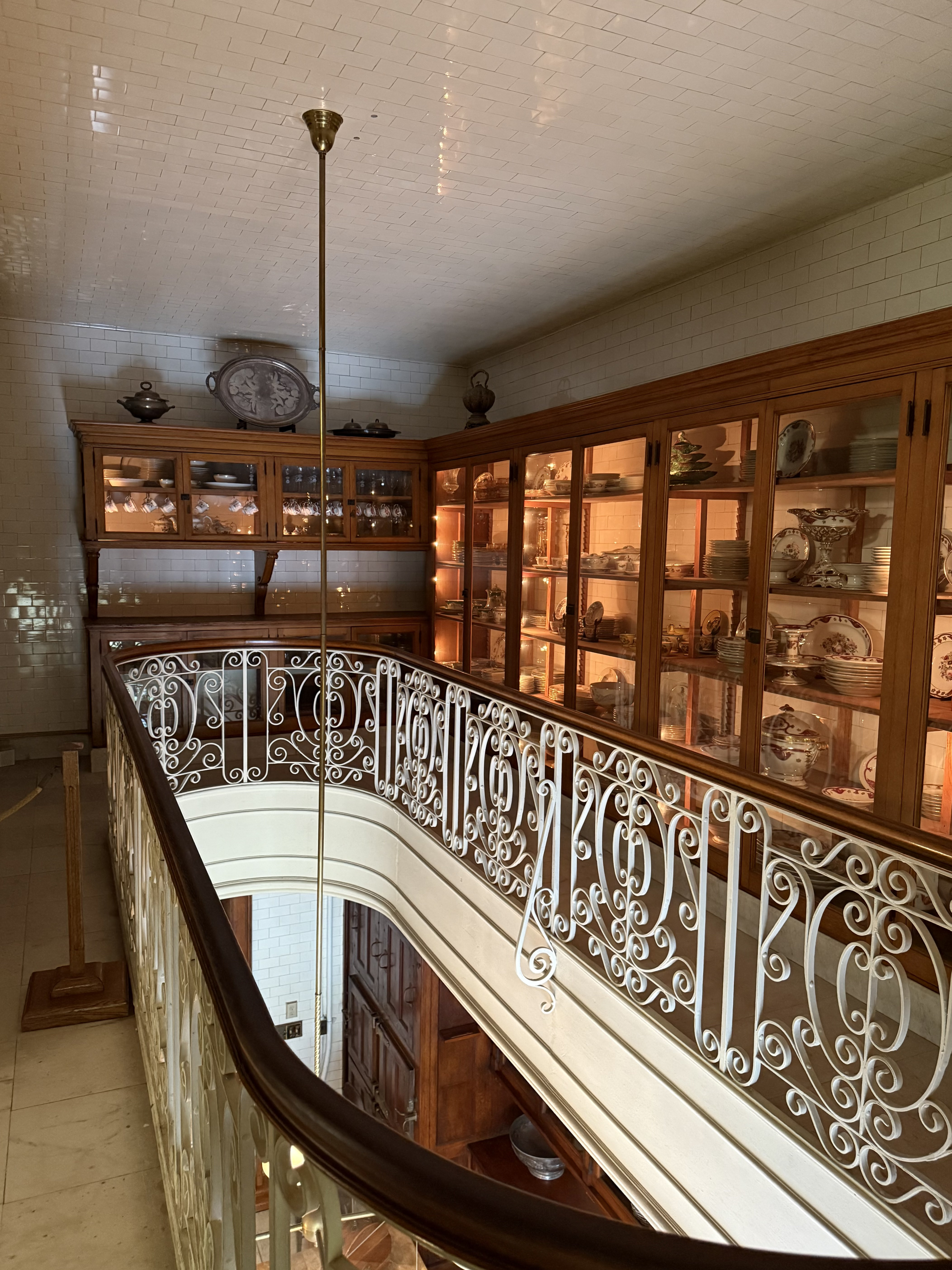
Dinnerware storage mezzanine and butler's pantry below, 2025
