= Vernon Court =

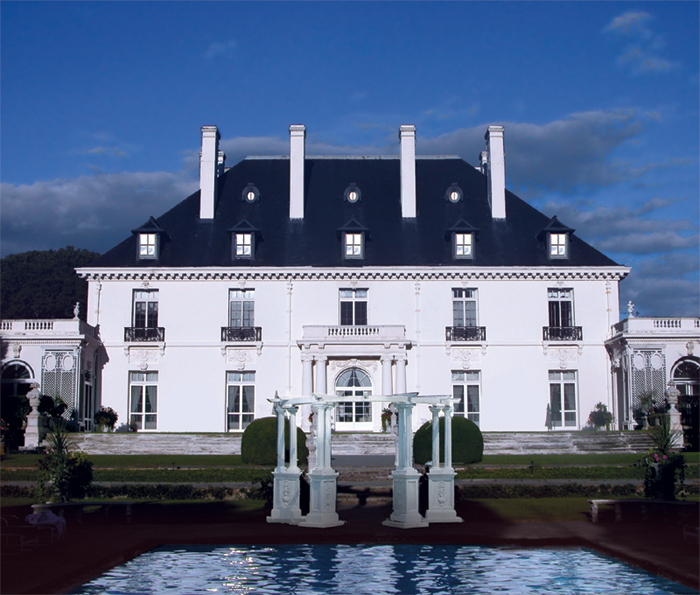
- Front elevation from Bellevue Avenue in 2008
- Interactive map of the Vernon Court area

General information
- Architectural style: French classical
- Location: Newport, Rhode Island, United States
- Coordinates: 41.4696°N 71.3069°W
- Construction started: 1900
- Completed: 1901
- Client: Anna Van Nest Gambrill

Design and construction
- Architect: Carrère and Hastings

Vernon Court is an American Renaissance-style mansion designed by architects Carrère and Hastings. It is located at 492 Bellevue Avenue, Newport, Rhode Island, on the Atlantic coast of the United States. The design is loosely based on that of an 18th-century French mansion, Château d'Haroué. (Note: The Château d'Haroué by Germain Boffrand is often cited as an inspiration for Carrère & Hastings' plans for Vernon Court. Resemblances are limited to the prominent slate roof à la française with small dormers, prominent chimneys and the segmental arch-headed fenestration.)

== History ==
Vernon Court was constructed in 1900 to be used as a summer cottage for the widow of Richard Augustine Gambrill, a New York lawyer, Anna Van Nest Gambrill (1865–1927). In addition to her husband's fortune, Anna Gambrill had inherited a substantial sum from her father, Alexander T. Van Nest, a railroad baron. Gambrill's sister, Jane and brother-in-law, Giraud Foster, had commissioned Carrère and Hastings a year earlier to design her estate near Lenox, Massachusetts, Bellefontaine (one of the Berkshire Cottages).

Although Carrère and Hastings typically considered the grounds and the architecture together as an ensemble, Gambrill hired her florists, the firm of Wadley & Smythe, as landscape architects for the property. They based their design for the primary garden loosely on the Pond Garden at Hampton Court Palace In 1904, it was considered one of "the ten most beautiful mansions in America."

The property remained in the Gambrill family until 1956, when it was auctioned. From 1963 until its closing in 1972, it served as the administration building for Vernon Court Junior College, an all-girls school. Over the next two and a half decades it passed through several different owners.

== Today ==
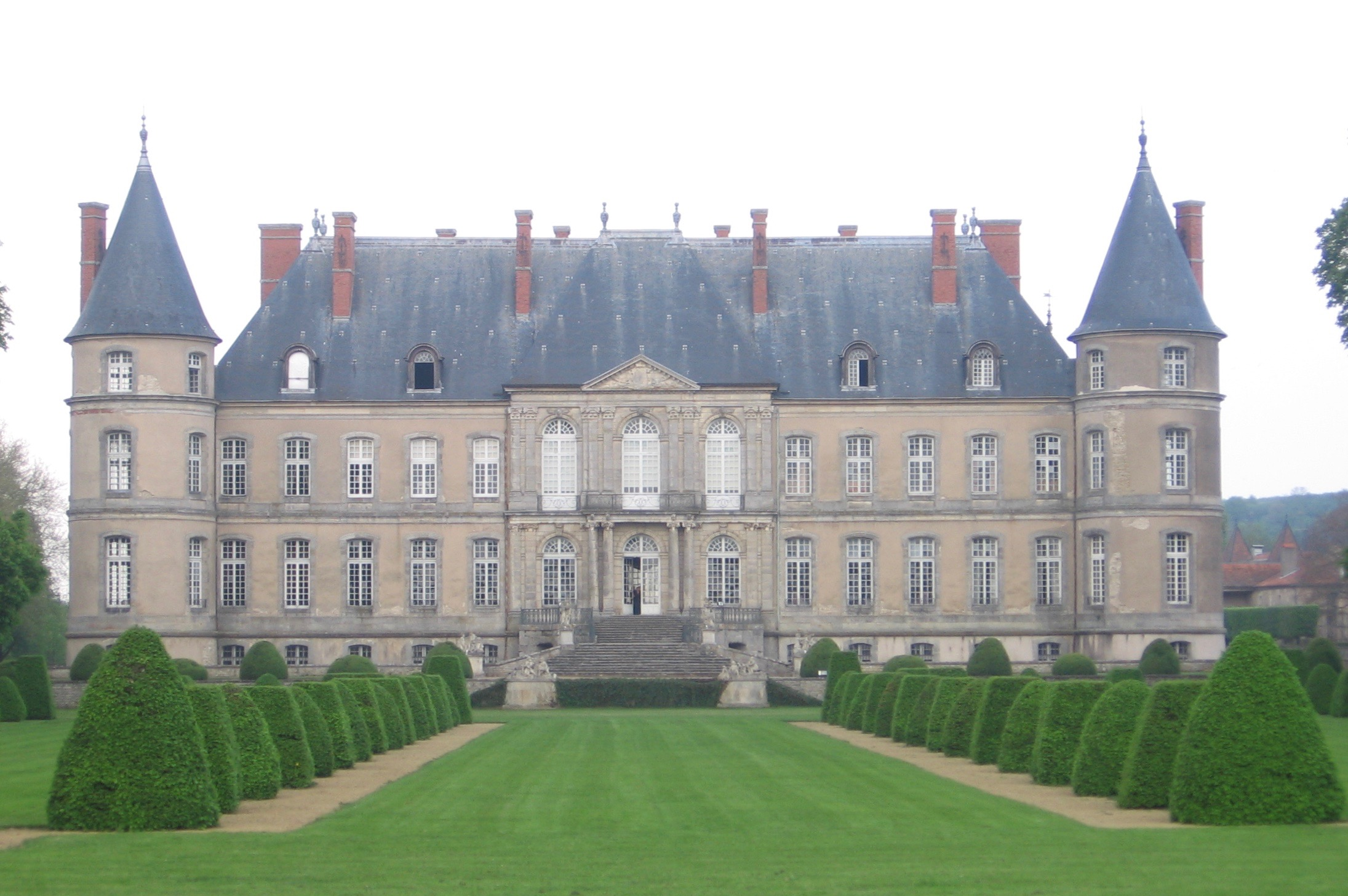
Château d'Haroué

In 1998, Vernon Court was acquired by Laurence and Judy Cutler, founders of the National Museum of American Illustration. The mansion currently houses the museum's collections of American illustration, as the Gilded Age architecture is contemporaneous with the "Golden Age of American Illustration" theme on which the collection focuses. The building is a significant contributing property to the National Register of Historic Places listed Bellevue Avenue Historic District that was added to the Register on December 8, 1972.

== See also ==
- National Museum of American Illustration
- Carrère and Hastings
