= National Museum of American Illustration =

American illustration museum

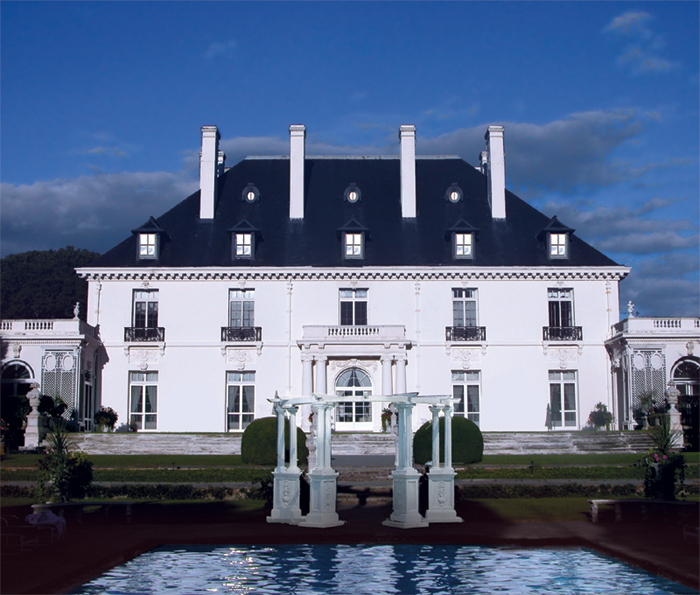
- Established: 1998; 28 years ago
- Location: Newport, Rhode Island, US
- Coordinates: 41.4696°N 71.3069°W
- Type: Visual art
- Directors: Laurence S. Cutler and Judy Goffman Cutler
- Website: http://www.americanillustration.org/

The National Museum of American Illustration (NMAI), founded in 1998, is the first national museum to be devoted exclusively to American illustration artwork. The NMAI is located in the Vernon Court mansion on Bellevue Avenue in Newport, Rhode Island. The museum's collection contains over 2,000 original works by noted American illustrators such as Norman Rockwell, Maxfield Parrish, J. C. Leyendecker, N.C. Wyeth, and others.

The Museum has been closed for renovation for several years and its website does not provide a date for reopening. As of May, 2026, the Museum no longer responds to emails.

== History and location ==
The NMAI was founded in 1998 by Laurence S. Cutler and Judy Goffman Cutler in their Vernon Court home. Prior to that, Goffman Cutler had worked as an art dealer and owned the American Illustrators Gallery but subsequently transferred her personal collection to the museum after selling items to George Lucas. The museum opened by appointment and then regularly to the public in October 2000 following a two-year challenge to gain approval. It is known for its Norman Rockwell collection.

In addition to Vernon Court, the adjacent property on Bellevue Avenue, Stoneacre, is owned by the museum. The property is named for the demolished mansion and the grounds for the site were designed by Frederick Law Olmsted, and following the purchase of the site, it has been restored as an arboretum in Olmsted’s honor. The mansion was designed by architect William A. Potter for John W. Ellis. Stoneacre was Olmsted's first commission after establishing his office in Brookline. In 2016 the grounds, which include several Rhode Island State Champion trees, were recognized as a level 1 arboretum by ArbNet.

== Collection ==
The NMAI’s American Imagist Collection focuses on artwork from the 'Golden Age of American Illustration', a period whose heyday dates from 1865 to 1945, with the end of the original Saturday Evening Post marking its ultimate demise.

The NMAI features original art created by illustrators such as Norman Rockwell, Maxfield Parrish, N.C. Wyeth, Howard Pyle, J. C. Leyendecker, and Jessie Willcox Smith. The illustrators created images integral to American culture, ranging from the New Year’s Baby to Uncle Sam. For these reasons, the NMAI’s collection has been named the American Imagist Collection.

Notable works by Norman Rockwell in the collection include Russian Schoolroom. The museum’s collection also includes many pieces of art memorabilia and artifacts such as Norman Rockwell's first paint box, Maxfield Parrish’s stippling paint brushes and a plethora of photographic materials.
