= Nathalie Bailey Morris =

American art collector

- Born: Alletta Nathalie Lorillard Bailey; January 2, 1888
- Died: January 12, 1935 (aged 47)
- Burial place: St. Ann's Episcopal Church Graveyard, Mott Haven, Bronx County, New York
- Spouse: Lewis Gouverneur Morris
- Children: Alletta Morris [MacDonald] McBean; Frances Elizabeth "Betty" Morris Smith
- Parents: James Muhlenberg Bailey; Alletta Remsen Lynch
- Family: Livingston family

Nathalie Lorillard Bailey Morris (January 2, 1888 – January 12, 1935) was an American art collector, philanthropist, and photographer prominent in New York City and Newport society.

== Early life ==
Morris was born Alletta Nathalie Lorillard Bailey to parents J. (James) Muhlenberg Bailey (1839-1897) and Alletta Remsen (née Lynch) Bailey (1852-1930). On her mother's side, she was a member of the Livingston family, while her father was a descendant of Pierre Abraham Lorillard. Her mother was engaged in the Women's suffrage movement, and was a member of private social clubs such as the Colony Club and Colonial Dames of America. The family lived at 77 Madison Avenue in New York City.

In 1908, Bailey married Lewis Gouverneur Morris II, a banker and member of the socially prominent Morris political family. Nathalie and Lewis Morris were second cousins, both being great-grandchildren of Jacob Lorillard (1774-1838) and his wife, Anna Margaretta (née Kunze) Lorillard (1791-1836). Their wedding was held at the Bailey family home in New York, and was attended by a small group of friends and family.

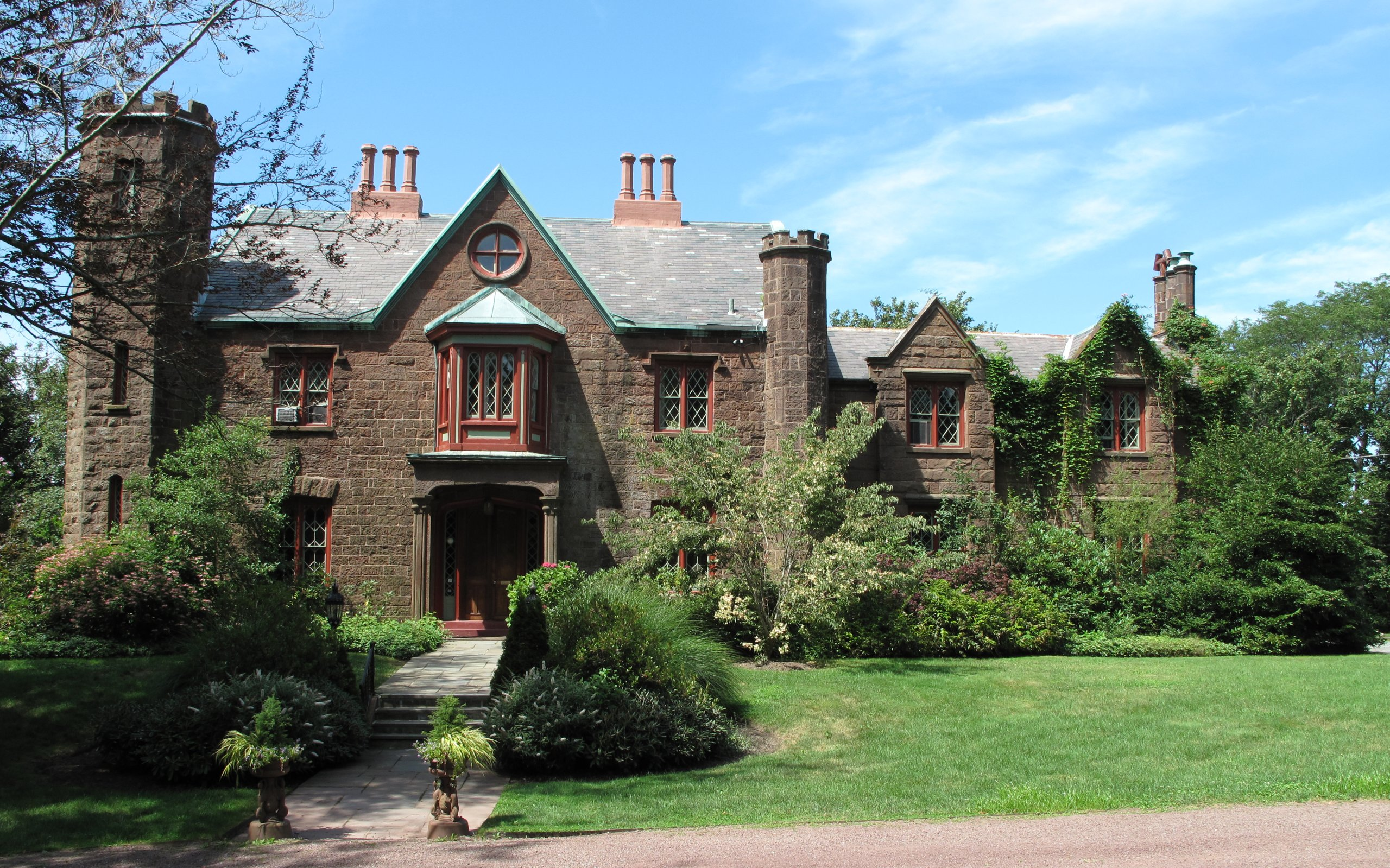
Malbone Castle and Estate, which Nathalie Bailey Morris owned starting in 1917.

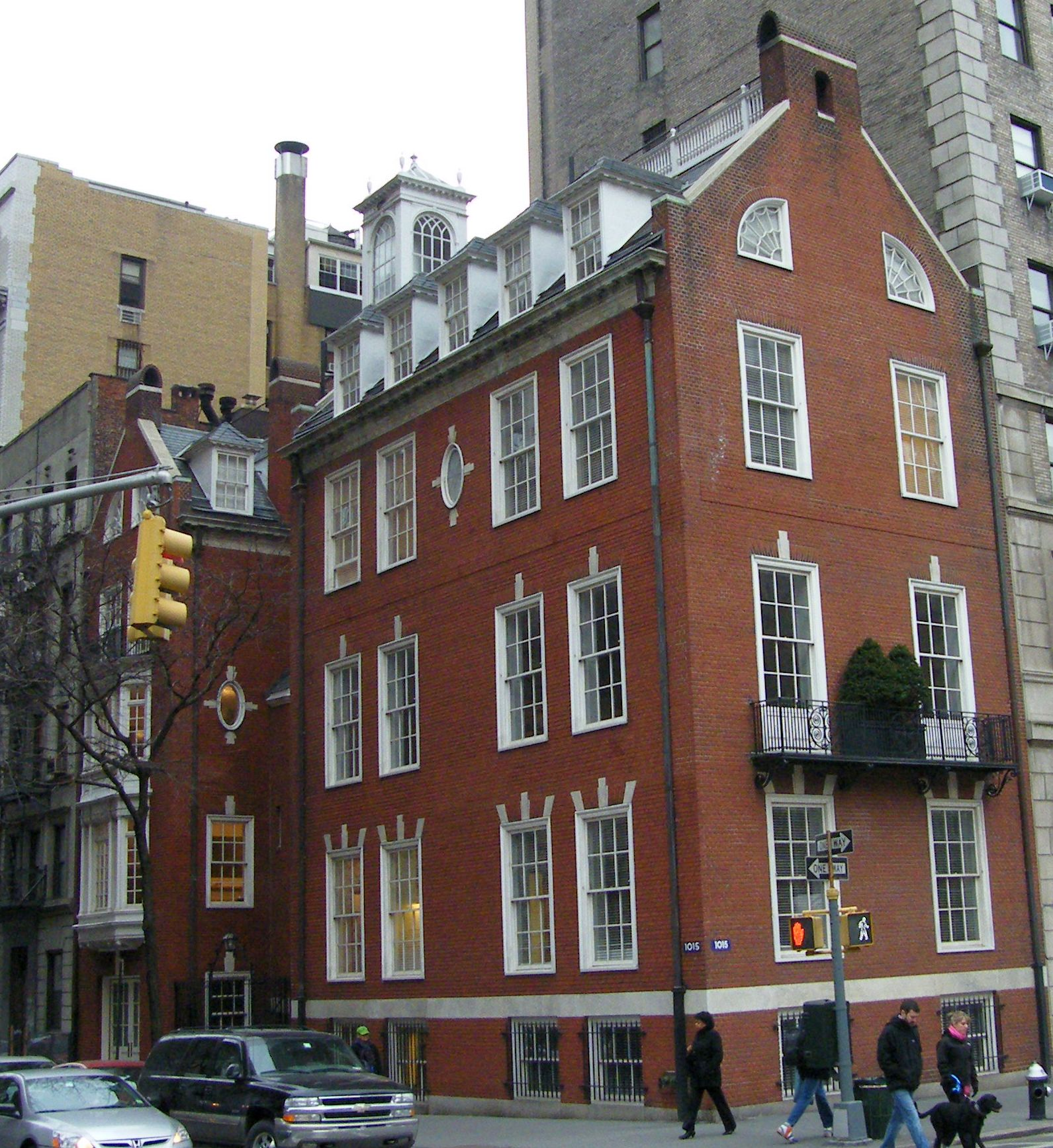
The Lewis G. and Nathalie Bailey Morris House at 1015 Park Avenue.

Nathalie and Lewis inherited Malbone Castle and Estate through Lewis's family; his grandfather, former Newport, Rhode Island Mayor Henry Bedlow (1821-1914), had inherited the property from his wife, Josephine Maria (née DeWolf) Bedlow (1831-1896), the niece of Malbone's first owner, J. (Jonathan) Prescott Hall (1796-1862). In addition to their Newport summer residence, the Morrises commissioned Ernest Flagg to design their Neo-Federal style home at 1015 Park Avenue in New York City, which was built in 1913-14; it is now a New York City Designated Landmark.

In 1917, Lewis G. Morris's brokerage firm, Morris & Pope, failed, and Lewis was confined to White Plains, New York on a $22,000 bond. It was alleged that Morris had illegally transferred assets into Nathalie's name, but the couple attested that these accounts were in fact Nathalie's property, even though they were carried in Lewis's name. Lewis was found to be an honest insolvent debtor after declaring that his assets consisted only of clothing, hats, one silver wrist watch, two razors, two tennis rackets, and $29.57 in cash. Also in 1917, Lewis transferred ownership of Malbone to Nathalie.

== Philanthropy and art collection ==
Morris was a Vice President and former board member of the New York Women's League for Animals, and advocated that every fifth block on Park Avenue should be set aside for exercising dogs. She was also a member of the Junior League.

Morris was an avid collector of American art and served as Vice Chairman of the women's committee of the Museum of the City of New York. In 1927, her collection of Hudson River School prints was exhibited at both the Gracie Mansion and Colonial Dames of America building. She also contributed works to exhibitions at the Metropolitan Museum of Art, and facilitated the Met's acquisition of architectural elements from abandoned Colonial houses in Rhode Island. Some of her art collection, including works by Fitz Henry Lane and Albert Bierstadt, is on view at Chepstow, the former home of her daughter, Alletta Morris McBean.

== Photography ==
Morris was an avid amateur photographer. Her ownership of Malbone inspired an interest in American Gothic Revival Style architecture, and, accompanied by her husband or chauffeur, she traveled throughout New England and Upstate New York to photograph houses of interest. These photos, along with related correspondence and Morris's research notes, are held by the Avery Architectural and Fine Arts Library Drawing and Archives department. Photo albums from Morris's travels, as well as her personal papers and her collection of family history materials, are held by the Preservation Society of Newport County.

== Personal life ==
Morris was an avid tennis player, playing socially in Newport but also competed at the national level, winning the national indoor women's tennis championship in 1920.

As a member of multiple prominent American families, Morris was a member of several hereditary organizations, including the Colonial Dames of America, Order of Colonial Lords of Manors in America, and Daughters of the Cincinnati. Like her mother, she was a member of the Colony Club, and a notable hostess in New York and Newport society.

With her husband, Morris had two daughters:

- Alletta Nathalie Lorillard Morris (1912-1986) was first married to Byrnes MacDonald (1908-1959), a founder of the Police Athletic League of New York City and assistant to Mayor Fiorello La Guardia, in 1935, shortly after Nathalie Morris's death. They had one son, George Morris MacDonald, born in 1942. Following Byrnes's death, Alletta married Peter McBean (1908-1997) of the Newhall Land and Farming Company. Alletta was active in philanthropic organizations including the Animal Medical Center of New York and involved with both the Newport Restoration Foundation and Preservation Society of Newport County. Upon her death, she willed her summer house, Chepstow, to the Preservation Society for use as a museum.
- Frances Elizabeth "Betty" Morris (1915-1994), also actively engaged in historical organizations including the Preservation Society of Newport County, where she was particularly involved in the stewardship of Kingscote. She was married three times, and had one daughter, Alletta Morris Smith (born 1955) with her third husband, Mortimer W. Smith, whom she married in 1954.

Both of Morris's daughters are namesakes of boats in the Save the Bay education fleet.

Morris died on January 12, 1935, after a brief illness. Her death occurred very shortly before her daughter Alletta's wedding to Byrnes MacDonald, leading to a postponement and eventually a very small ceremony limited to immediate family.
