= Lewis G. Morris =

American farmer and activist (1808–1900)

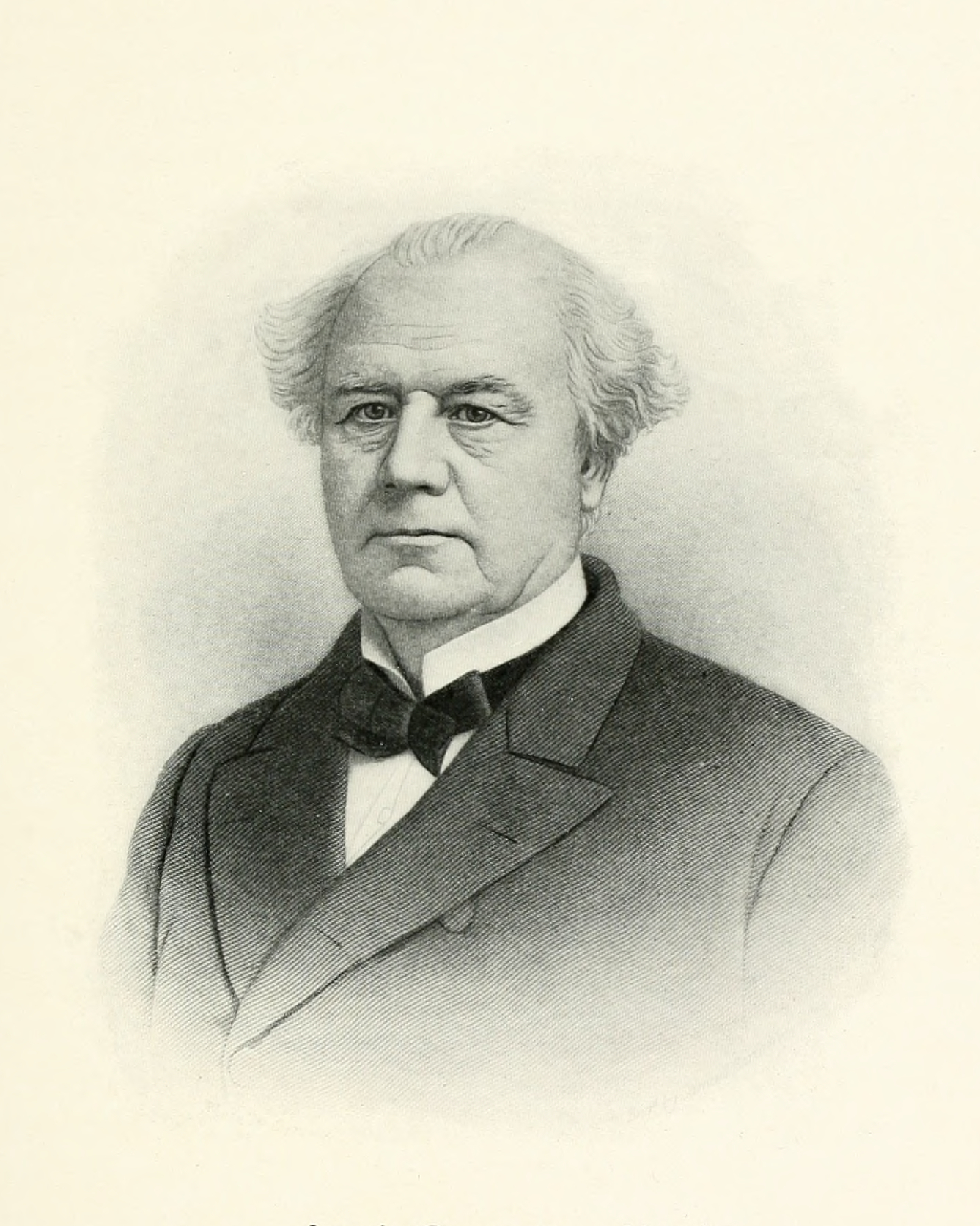
- Born: Lewis Gouverneur Morris; August 19, 1808; Claverack, New York, US
- Died: September 19, 1900 (aged 92); Fordham, New York, US
- Occupations: Maritime advocate, sheep and cattle breeder
- Spouse: Emily Lorillard (m. 1839; died 1850)
- Children: 4
- Relatives: Richard Morris (grandfather); Lewis Gouverneur Morris II (grandson); James A. Hamilton (brother-in-law)

Lewis Gouverneur Morris (August 19, 1808 – September 19, 1900) was an American maritime advocate and sheep and cattle breeder who was a member of the prominent Morris family of Morrisania.

== Early life ==
Morris was born on August 19, 1808, in Claverack, New York. He was the youngest son of Robert Richard Morris and Frances Ludlam. His elder sister, Mary Morris, was married to James Alexander Hamilton, third son of Alexander Hamilton and Elizabeth Schuyler Hamilton.

His paternal grandparents were Richard Morris, Chief Justice of the New York Supreme Court, and Sarah (née Ludlow) Morris, the sister of William Henry Ludlow. His great uncle was Gouverneur Morris Jr. and his great-great uncle was Gouverneur Morris, a Founding Father of the United States, signatory to the Articles of Confederation and U.S. Constitution who wrote the Preamble to the United States Constitution and has been called the "Penman of the Constitution.".

== Career ==
Morris, who inherited "Mt. Fordham", his family's estate, was a resident of Morris Heights, New York, maintained a small farm at Fordham, until it was encroached upon. He then purchased another farm in Scarsdale and on these farms bred sheep and cattle.

In 1838, he took up his lifelong fight to restore and improve the Harlem River. After careful legal consultation and planning, on September 14, 1838, he led a raid on the Macombs Dam, and restored the channel. After a long legal battle with the dam's owner, he persevered in Renwick v. Morris. The removal of the dam was justified as being a public nuisance in violation of the original provisions of the dam's public authorization.

Morris also championed the design of the Croton Aqueduct to soar over the Harlem River at High Bridge, rather than block the channel. He also pushed to see the Harlem River Ship Canal become a reality.

He was president of the New York State Agricultural Society and a member of the Royal Agricultural Society of England.

=== Military service ===
In 1840, Morris was appointed inspector of the New York State Militia, 4th Division, with the rank of colonel. During the U.S. Civil War, he was prominent and active in support of the Union, serving as a member of the War Committee. In August 1862, he again was appointed Colonel and was noted for recruiting the 135th Regiment of Infantry, later known as the 6th New York Heavy Artillery Regiment, under the command of Brigadier Gen. William H. Morris, son of George Pope Morris, the poet, although neither were members of his Morris family.

== Personal life ==
In July 1839, he married Emily Lorillard (1819–1850), the daughter of Jacob Lorillard (1774–1836) and granddaughter of Pierre Abraham Lorillard, founder of the Lorillard Tobacco Company. Her sister Eliza Meier Lorillard married Nathaniel Platt Bailey. Together, they were the parents of four sons, two of whom died young. Their two surviving sons were:

- Fordham Morris (1842–1909), who married Annie Louisa Westcott, daughter of Joseph H. Westcott, in 1872.
- Francis Morris (1844–1883), who married Harriet Hall Bedlow, daughter of Henry Bedlow. After his death, she married John Rex Guelph-Norman (1861–1932), who claimed to be the son of King Edward VII and rightful heir to the throne, in 1898. They divorced after she discovered he had a wife in India.

Morris died at his home, Mt. Fordham, on September 19, 1900, at the age of 92.

=== Descendants ===
Through his son Fordham, he was the grandfather of Emily Lorillard Morris, who married Rolaz Horace Gallatin, son of Frederic Gallatin and Almy Goelet (née Gerry), and cousin of Albert Eugene Gallatin and nephew of Commodore Elbridge Thomas Gerry, in April 1896.

Through his son Francis, he was the grandfather of Lewis Gouverneur Morris Jr. (1882–1967), the original proprietor of the Lewis G. Morris House and husband of art collector Nathalie Bailey Morris. After her death, he was married to Princess Anita of Braganza (1886–1977), the daughter of William Rhinelander Stewart and widow of Prince Miguel, Duke of Viseu.
