= Chepstow (mansion) =

Building in Rhode Island, United States

Coordinates: 41°28′34.1″N 71°18′17.7″W

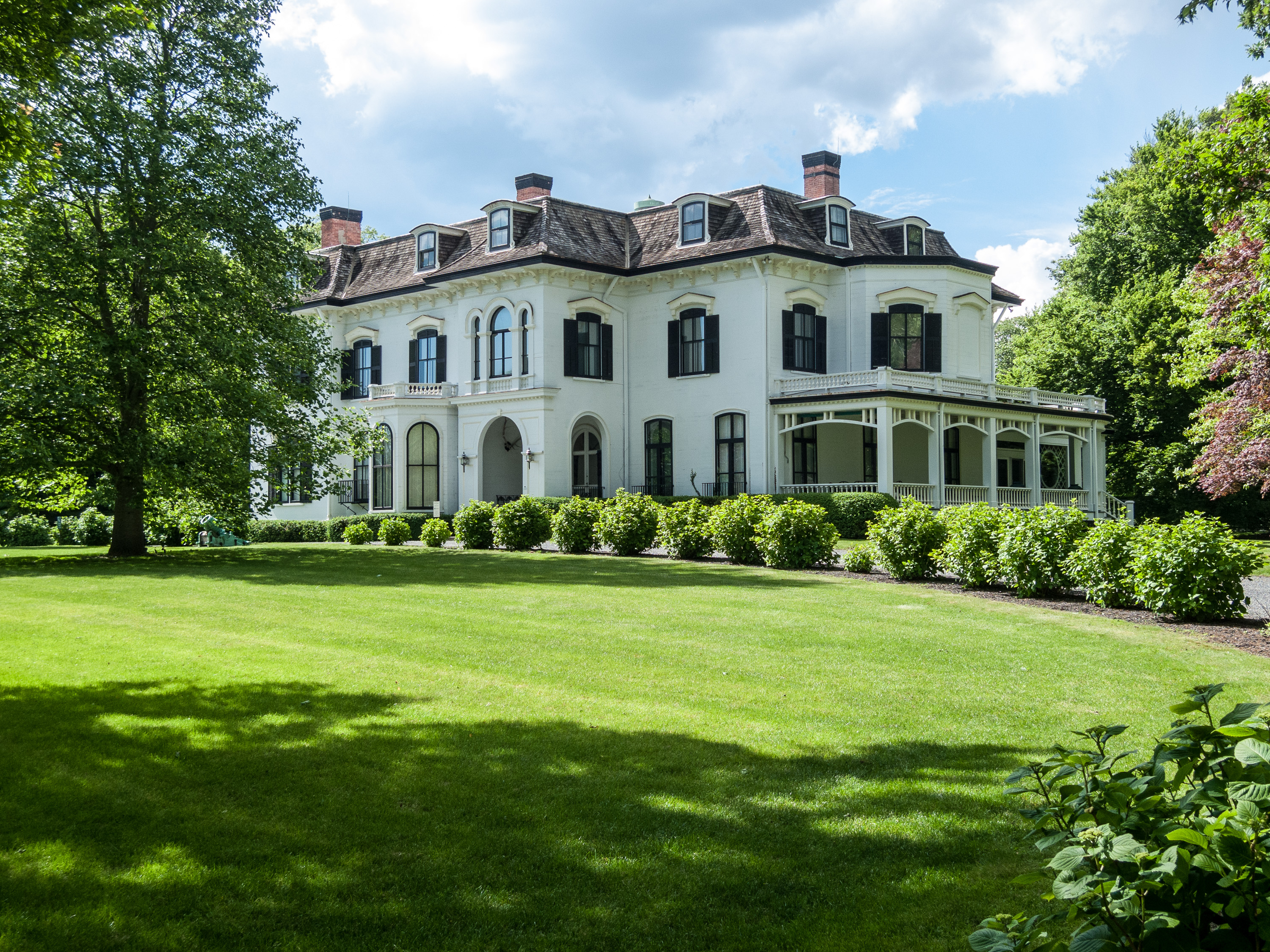
- Chepstow, June 2017

General information
- Architectural style: Italianate, Second Empire
- Location: 120 Narragansett Avenue in Newport, RI
- Completed: 1860
- Client: Edmund Schermerhorn
- Owner: Preservation Society of Newport County

Design and construction
- Architects: George Champlin Mason Sr. John K. Grosvenor (1979 addition)

Website
- newportmansions.org/explore/chepstow

Chepstow is an Italianate house located at 120 Narragansett Avenue in Newport, Rhode Island, built in 1860. It originally served as a summer "cottage", but the Preservation Society of Newport County now operates the property as a house museum. It was listed in the National Register of Historic Places as part of the Ochre Point-Cliffs Historic District in 1975 and within the Historic District of the City of Newport.

== History ==
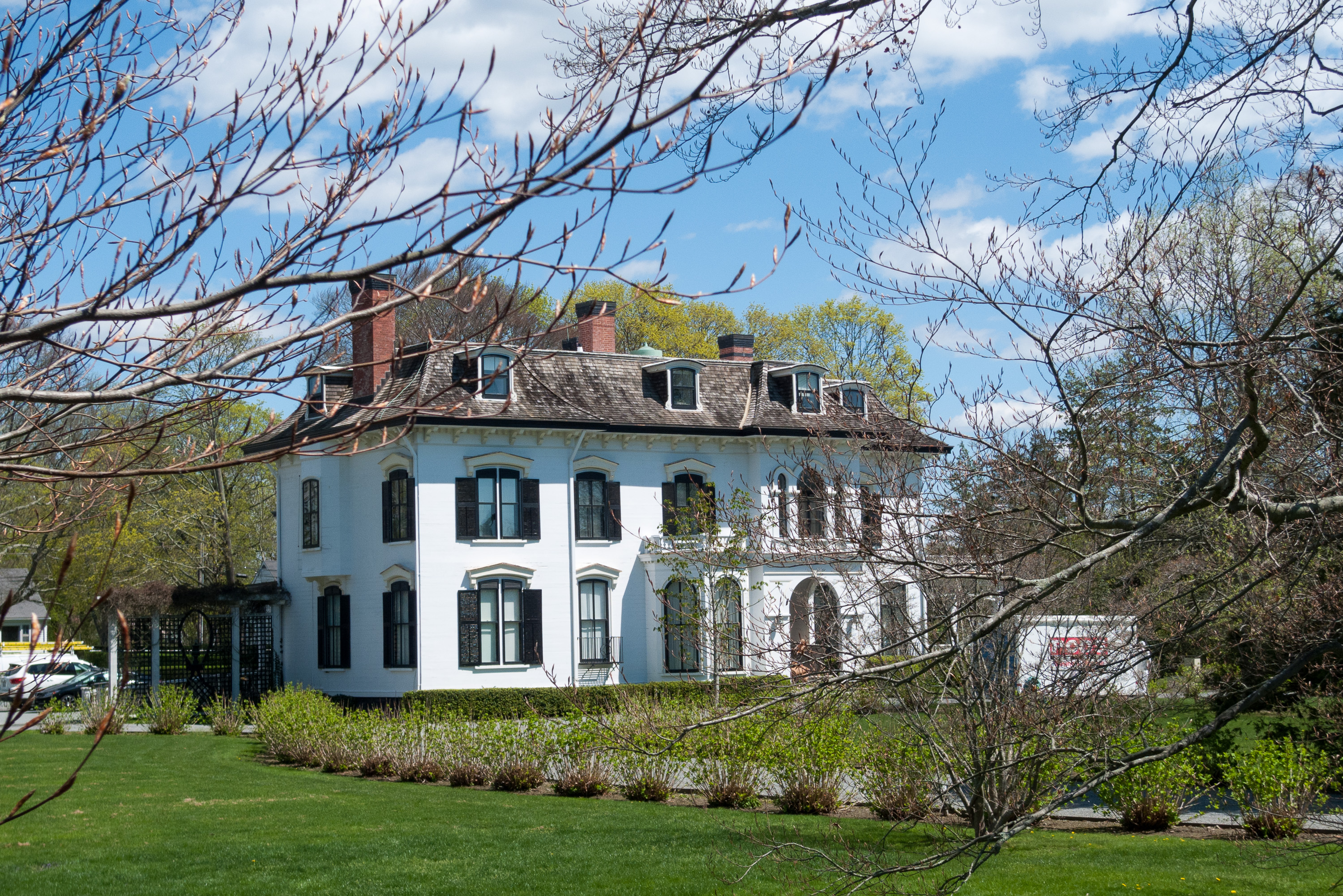
Chepstow, May 2017

Edmund Schermerhorn hired George Champlin Mason Sr. to build the house in 1860 as a summer home. Schermerhorn was a first cousin of Mrs. Astor (formerly Caroline Webster Schermerhorn), one of Newport's most active hostesses. Schermerhorn used the property as his full-time residence for several years leading up to his death in 1891, leading some to describe him as a "recluse". Following his death, Schermerhorn's brother William Colford Schermerhorn became the property's owner.

In 1911, it was sold to Rolaz Horace Gallatin a cousin of Albert Eugene Gallatin and nephew of Commodore Elbridge Thomas Gerry, and his wife, Emily Lorillard (née Morris) Gallatin.. Emily, a first cousin of Lewis Gouverneur Morris, named the property for Chepstow, the town in Wales from which the Morris family originated. (Note: The Morris family also bequeathed Malbone to the Preservation Society of Newport County in 1978, who sold the estate to Patricia and Philip Archer Thomas in 1980.)

Following Emily and Rolaz Horace Gallatin's deaths in 1944 and 1948, respectively, ownership of the property was divided equally between Emily's cousin, Lewis Gouverneur Morris, and his two daughters, Alletta Nathalie Lorillard MacDonald (née Morris, later McBean) and Frances Elizabeth "Betty" Perry (née Morris, previously Carhart, later Smith). Alletta purchased her father's and sister's shares to become the outright owner of the property in 1949. Upon her death in 1986, Alletta Morris McBean donated the property and its contents to the Preservation Society of Newport County, with the stipulation that her second husband, Peter McBean be permitted to use the house as he wished until his death. After Peter McBean's death in 1997, the Preservation Society began operating the property as a historic house museum.

The house has been altered through additions, the most recent in 1979 with the addition of the garden room (also called the sun room) by architect John K. Grosvenor.

== Present day ==
The property houses a dynamic collection of art and furniture, including some from other Morris family residences, such as the Lewis G. Morris House and Malbone Castle and Estate. Chepstow houses a collection of American paintings, mostly purchased by Alletta Morris McBean's mother, Nathalie Bailey Morris, featuring works by Fitz Hugh Lane, George Harvey, Albert Bierstadt, and Granville Perkins. Other collection pieces include a portrait of George Washington by Jane Stuart, daughter of Gilbert Stuart, a portrait of Peter Muhlenberg, and silhouettes by Eveline Adelheid von Maydell and Auguste Edouart. Nathalie Bailey Morris was also a collector of miniatures by Edward Greene Malbone and Ann Hall, some of which are on view in Chepstow.

Among the house's furnishings is a walnut Queen Anne side chair reportedly owned by William Penn and a cabinet reportedly owned by Thomas Wolsey.
