= Peter Lorillard =

Peter Lorillard may refer to:

- Pierre Abraham Lorillard, New York City business man, also called Peter Abraham Lorillard and Peter Lorillard
- Pierre Lorillard II, New York City business man, also called Peter Lorillard
