= Nathaniel Platt Bailey =

American merchant and philanthropist

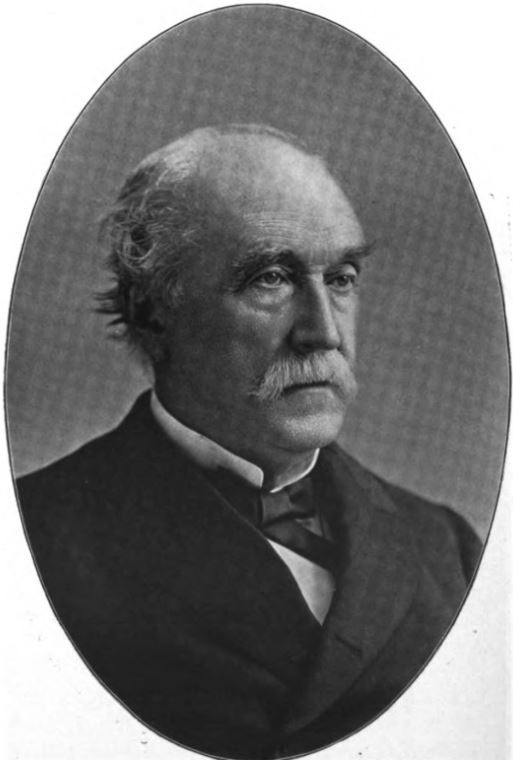

26th President of the Saint Nicholas Society of the City of New York
- In office 1884–1884
- Preceded by: Abraham Riker Lawrence
- Succeeded by: Cornelius Vanderbilt II

Personal details
- Born: June 7, 1809 Chateangay, New York, U.S.
- Died: October 12, 1891 (aged 82) Fordham Heights, New York, U.S.
- Spouse: Eliza Meier Lorillard (m. 1836)
- Relations: Theodorus Bailey (uncle)
- Children: 3
- Parent(s): William Bailey; Phoebe Platt Bailey

Nathaniel Platt Bailey (June 7, 1809 – October 12, 1891) was an American merchant and philanthropist.

== Early life ==
Bailey was born on June 7, 1809, at Chateangay near Plattsburgh, New York. He was the son of William Bailey (1763–1840) and his second wife, Phoebe (née Platt) Bailey (1779–1859). His father's first wife was Hannah Hagaman, who died in 1798. Among his siblings was Phebe Altie Bailey, and Theodorus Bailey, John William Bailey, and Mary Elizabeth Bailey. His father was a pioneer settler and surveyor in Clinton and Franklin Counties who later became a Judge.

His paternal grandparents were Altje (née Van Wyck) Bailey and Col. John Bailey. His uncle was Theodorus Bailey, a U.S. Representative and U.S. Senator from New York. His maternal grandparents were Phebe (née Smith) Platt and Capt. Nathaniel Platt (brother of Zephaniah Platt and uncle to Judge Jonas Platt and New York State Treasurer Charles Z. Platt).

== Career ==
In 1824, Bailey came to New York and entered into business as a merchant, retiring when he was thirty-five years old. He was a Vestryman of Trinity Church served as a senior Governor of New York Hospital.

Bailey also owned 28 acres (11 ha) in the Bronx, part of what is now called West Fordham (formerly the site of Fort No. 6 during the Revolutionary War, extending from Fordham Road to Kingsbridge Road and from Bailey Avenue to University Avenue. There, Bailey built a large mansion that overlooked the Harlem River, and, reportedly, the New Jersey Palisades to the west. Upon his death, the estate was subdivided into streets and avenues and the bulk of the property became the grounds of the current U.S. Veterans Medical Center.

Bailey was a member of the Union League Club, the Union Club, the Century Club and the Saint Nicholas Society of the City of New York, for which he served one term as president the 26th President in 1884, succeeding Abraham Riker Lawrence. He previously served as third vice-president in 1879, second vice-president in 1880 to 1881, and first vice-president from 1882 to 1883.

== Personal life ==
On July 26, 1836, Bailey was married to Eliza Meier Lorillard (1815–1900). Eliza was a daughter of Jacob Lorillard Jr., a wealthy leather merchant, and a granddaughter of Jacob Lorillard (son of Pierre Abraham Lorillard, founder of the Lorillard Tobacco Company). Her sister Emily Lorillard married Lewis G. Morris. Together, they were the parents of three children, including:

- Ann Mary Bailey (1837–1864), who married her second cousin, Theodorus Bailey Woolsey (1839–1907), a grandson of Theodorus Bailey.
- Lorillard Bailey (1839–1860), a twin who died aged 21, unmarried.
- James Muhlenberg Bailey (1839–1897), a twin who married Alletta Remsen Lynch (1870–1930), a daughter of Edward Livingston Lynch and a descendant of Robert Livingston, first Lord of Livingston Manor, and Robert R. Livingston of Clermont.

Bailey died at his country residence in Fordham Heights in New York City on October 12, 1891. After a funeral at Trinity Chapel on West 25th Street, he was buried alongside his family in the Poughkeepsie Rural Cemetery in Poughkeepsie, New York. In 1899, his Bronx estate was sold to the Sisters of Charity for $290,000 (equivalent to $11,223,000 today) and was used to operate the Roman Catholic Orphan Asylum.

=== Descendants and legacy ===
Through his son James, he was a grandfather of Alletta Nathalie Lorillard Bailey (1883–1935), an amateur architectural historian and photographer, who married Lewis Gouverneur Morris II (1882–1967) in 1908. After Alletta's death, Morris remarried to Anita de Braganza, widow of Prince Miguel, Duke of Viseu.

Bailey is the namesake of a playground known as Bailey Playground and bounding Bailey Avenue in Kingsbridge, Bronx.
