= Katherine Urquhart Warren =

American historian of Rhode Island

Katherine Urquhart Warren (née Urquhart, 1897 – April 18, 1976) was a co-founder and first president of the Preservation Society of Newport in Newport, Rhode Island. She was posthumously inducted into the Rhode Island Heritage Hall of Fame in 1981.

Warren was born in Oakland, California in 1897. She was educated at the Spence School in New York City. She married George Warren in 1919. She and her husband founded the Preservation Society of Newport County to save the colonial-era Hunter House from demolition. She received a Cross of Knight Légion d'Honneur for her work on the Rochambeau Festival in 1954. The efforts of the Preservation Society of Newport lead former United States First Lady, Jacqueline Kennedy, to appoint Warren to the committee to restore the White House in 1961.

In addition to her work with the Newport Preservation Society, Warren served on the boards of the Museum of Modern Art in New York City, New York, the Rhode Island School of Design, and the Newport Music Festival.

== Awards ==
- 1955, Woman of the Year, Newport County Chamber of Commerce
- 1955, Cross of Knight, Légion d'Honneur
- 1972, Honorary Doctorate, Salve Regina University
- 1976, Louise Evalina du Pont Crowninshield Award, National Trust for Historic Preservation
- 1981, Rhode Island Heritage Hall of Fame (posthumous)
