= Lewis Gouverneur Morris II =

Banker and social figure in New York and Newport society

- Born: June 4, 1882; Newport, Rhode Island, U.S.
- Died: August 14, 1967 (aged 85); Newport, Rhode Island, U.S.
- Education: Harvard University
- Spouses: Nathalie Lorillard Bailey (m. 1908; died 1935) Anita of Braganza (m. 1946)
- Children: 2
- Parent(s): Francis Morris; Harriet Hall Bedlow
- Relatives: Lewis G. Morris (grandfather)

Lewis Gouverneur Morris II (June 4, 1882 – August 14, 1967) was a banker and prominent social figure in New York and Newport Society.

== Early life ==
Morris was born on June 4, 1882, in Newport, Rhode Island. He was the son of Francis Morris (1845–1883), a Knickerbocker gentleman and descendant of Gouverneur Morris (a signer of the Articles of Confederation and the United States Constitution), and his wife Harriet Hall Bedlow (1849–1923). After his father's death, his mother married John Rex Guelph-Norman (1861–1932), who claimed to be the son of King Edward VII and rightful heir to the throne, in 1898. They divorced after she discovered he had a wife in India.

His paternal grandparents were Lewis Gouverneur Morris, for whom he was named, and Emily (née Lorillard) Morris (1819–1850). His maternal grandparents were Henry Bedlow (1821–1914) and Josephine Maria DeWolf (née Homer) Bedlow (1831–1896). He was first cousin of Emily Lorillard Morris (b. 1873), who married Rolaz Horace Gallatin (d. 1948), a cousin of Albert Eugene Gallatin and nephew of Commodore Elbridge Thomas Gerry, in April 1896.

Morris graduated from Harvard University in 1906.

== Career ==
He was a former member of the New York Stock Exchange.

In 1915, Morris organized Morris & Pope, an investment firm. In the spring of 1917, the firm failed which left Morris heavily in debt. He was imprisoned in Westchester County, from June 18, 1921, until October 5, 1921, as a debtor. He was eventually discharged as an honest insolvent debtor.

New York directory listings indicate that, after his failure in 1917, Morris did not re-entered the business world.

Morris served as a trustee of the Museum of the City of New York.

=== Residences ===
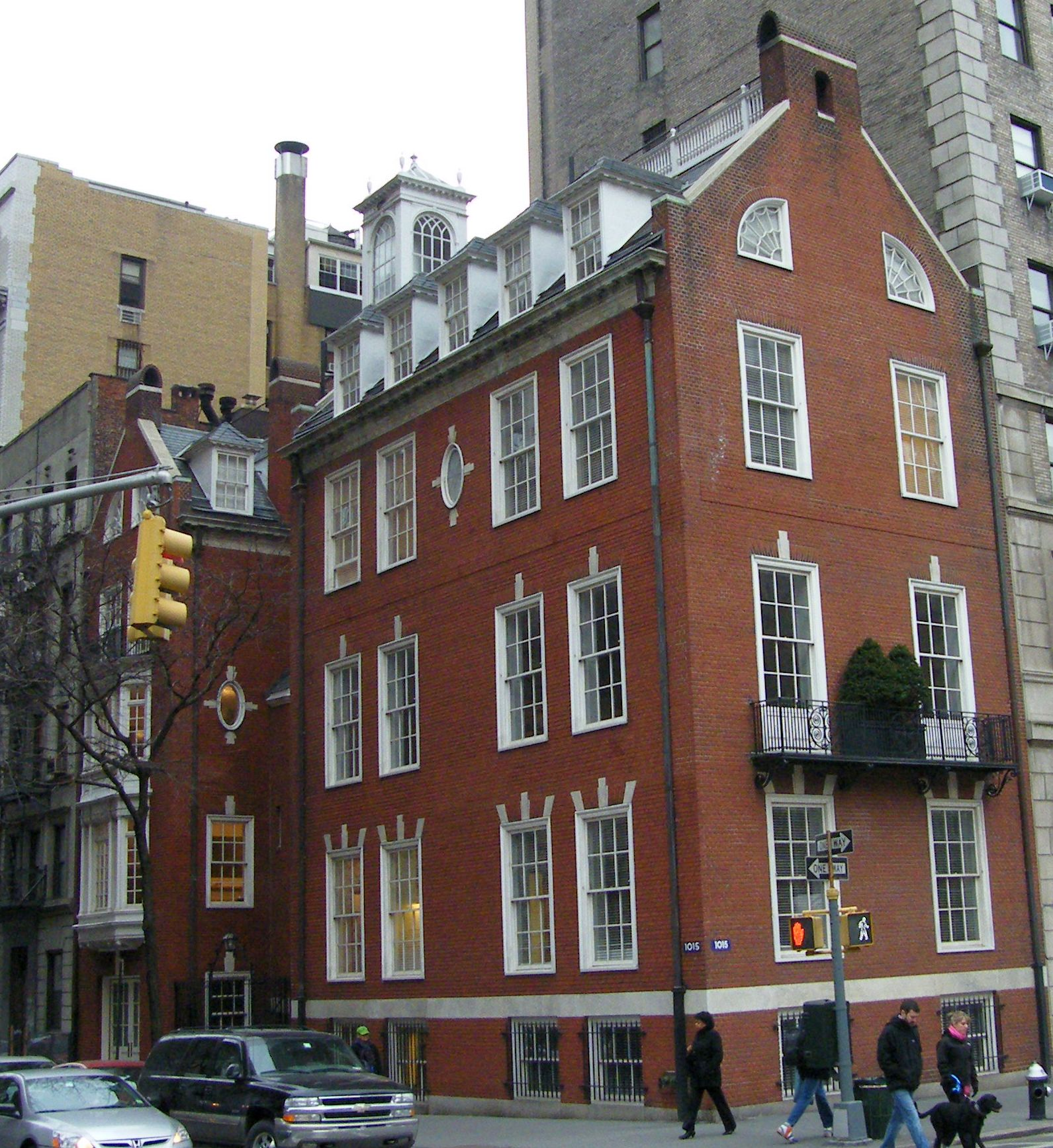
Morris' New York residence, 1015 Park Avenue

In 1913, Morris bought the southeast corner of 85th Street and Park Avenue from Amos Pinchot. Morris and his wife hired Ernest Flagg who designed and built their home, which was completed in 1914. The home is in a "Federal style, in trim proportions with leaded glass windows of unusual shape and a roof balustrade and square cupola."

In 1904, Morris bought the former summer home of his maternal grandfather in Newport, Rhode Island. The large villa in the Gothic Revival style known as "Malbone". Malbone was designed by American architect Alexander Jackson Davis in 1848–1850. The house's interiors had been remodeled in 1875 under the supervision of noted local architect Dudley Newton who added a "massive carved oak staircase."

== Personal life ==
In 1908, he married Alletta Nathalie Lorillard Bailey (1883–1935), an amateur architectural historian and photographer. She was the daughter of James Muhlenberg Bailey (1839–1897) and Alletta Remsen (née Lynch) Bailey (1870–1930), and a granddaughter of Nathaniel Platt Bailey. She was also a descendant of Robert Livingston, first Lord of Livingston Manor, Robert R. Livingston of Clermont. They were actually distant cousins, both being great-grandchildren of Jacob Lorillard, the son of Pierre Abraham Lorillard, founder of the Lorillard Tobacco Company. Together, they were the parents of:

- Alletta Nathalie Lorillard Morris (1912–1986), who was married to Byrnes MacDonald, an investor, in 1935. After his death, she married Peter McBean (1910–1997).
- Frances Elizabeth Morris (1915–1994), who married Morton W. Smith, a breeder of thoroughbred horses, in 1954.

In 1946, Morris married Anita Rhinelander (née Stewart) de Braganza (1886–1977) in New York City. She was the daughter of Annie McKee Armstrong (1864–1925) and William Rhinelander Stewart (1852–1929), the niece of State Senator Lispenard Stewart, and the widow of Prince Miguel, Duke of Viseu (1878–1923). She was the mother of three children from her first marriage, Nadejda de Braganza (1910–1946), John de Braganza (1912–1991), and Miguel de Braganza (1915–1996).

Morris died at the age of 85, on August 14, 1967, at his home in Newport, Rhode Island. His widow also died at their home in Newport in 1977.

=== Descendants ===
Through his daughter Elizabeth, he was the grandfather of Alletta Morris Smith, a trustee of the Rhode Island Historical Society and lifetime member of the Newport Historical Society and of the Redwood Library, who married William J. Cooper Jr. in 1981.
