= Lispenard Stewart =

American politician (1855-1927)

Lispenard Stewart Jr.
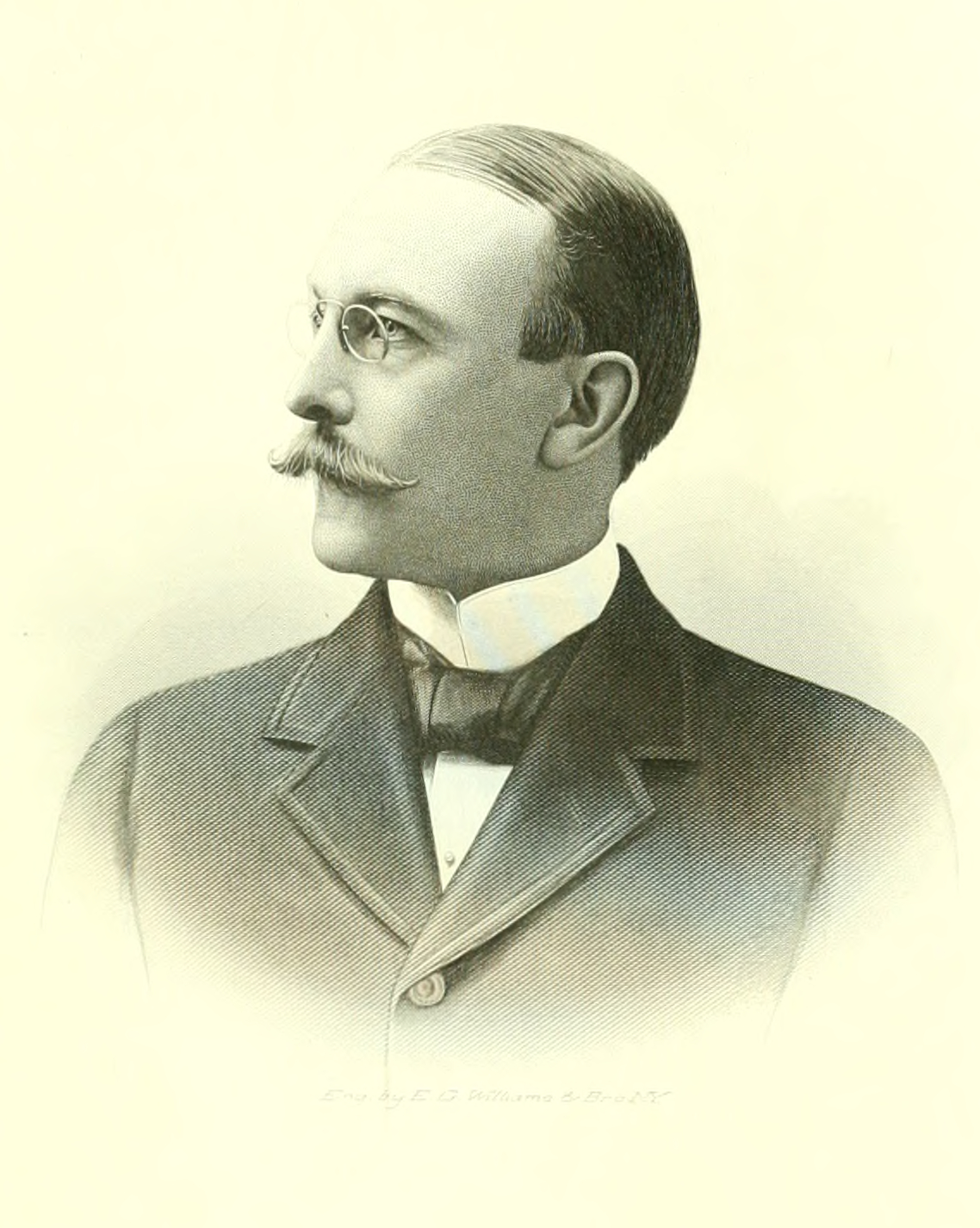

Member of the New York State Senate from the 8th District
- In office January 1, 1890 – December 31, 1891
- Preceded by: Cornelius Van Cott
- Succeeded by: Martin T. McMahon

Personal details
- Born: June 19, 1855 Hudson, New York
- Died: October 19, 1927 (aged 72) New York City, New York
- Party: Republican
- Relations: Anita of Braganza (niece); T.J. Oakley Rhinelander (cousin)
- Parent(s): Lispenard Stewart; Mary Rogers Rhinelander
- Education: Yale University; Columbia Law School

Lispenard Stewart Jr. (June 19, 1855 – October 15, 1927) was an American lawyer who served as New York State Senator.

== Early life ==
Stewart was born on June 19, 1855, in Hudson, New York. He was the son of Lispenard Stewart (1809–1867) and his wife Mary Rogers Rhinelander (1821–1893, a member of the New York prominent Rhinelander family and first cousin of Frederic W. Rhinelander). He was the brother of Sarah Lispenard Stewart (1837–1920), William Rhinelander Stewart (1852–1929), and Mary Rhinelander Stewart (1859–1949), who married iron magnate Frank S. Witherbee.

Through his brother William, he was the uncle of Anita Rhinelander Stewart (1886–1977) who married Prince Miguel, Duke of Viseu, grandson of King Miguel I of Portugal.

His paternal grandparents were Alexander Stewart (nephew of Continental Congressman Lt.-Col. Charles Stewart) and Sarah Stewart (née Lispenard, a granddaughter of Col. Leonard Lispenard). He was the maternal grandson of William Christopher Rhinelander (1790–1878), Lieutenant in Colonel Stevens' Regiment in the War of 1812.

He graduated from Yale in 1876, the same year he entered Columbia Law School, graduating in 1878. During his second year in the law school studied also in law office of Platt & Gerard.

== Career ==
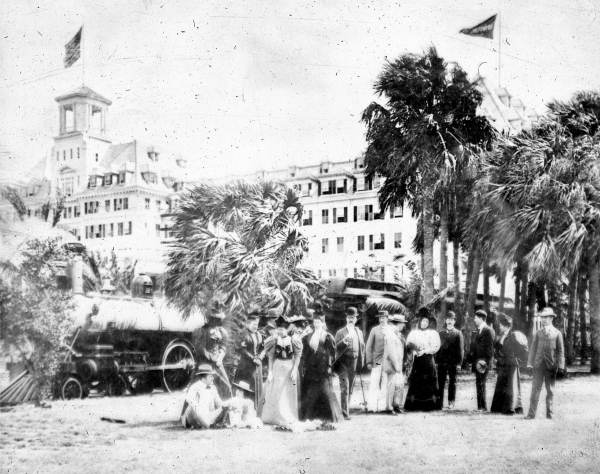
Royal Poinciana guests on March 14, 1896. From left to right: Colonel Philip M. Lydig, Miss Helen Morton, Miss Gladys Vanderbilt, Miss Amy Townsend, Captain A.T. Rose, Mrs. Cornelius Vanderbilt, Miss Edith Bishop, Miss Mabel Gerry, Thomas Cushing, Edward Livingston, Dudley Winthrop, Craig Wadsworth, Miss Gertrude Vanderbilt, Lispenard Stewart, Harry P. Whitney, Miss Sybil Sherman, Cornelius Vanderbilt.

While still in law school, he was admitted to the office of the estate of his great-grandfather, William Rhinelander. He was admitted to the bar May 27, 1879, and then became created a firm with his brother, known as "William R. Stewart & Lispenard Stewart, Attorneys" which they ran until 1900. He devoted most of his time to the administration of estates, charitable, philanthropic, and educational work.

In January, 1877, he was granted power of attorney for his mother and two aunts. After his grandfather's death in June 1878, he was named one of three executors and trustees, by his grandfather, in November 1878. The estate of William Rhinelander, who was a prominent merchant, was valued conservatively at $60,000,000 upon his death. By the time of his mother's death in 1893, the estate was said to be worth $75,000,000 with annual income in excess of $3,000,000. He was elected a director of the Rhinelander Real Estate Company in 1903, becoming its first treasurer. He served until November 1921 when poor health forced him to resign. He was then elected vice-president of the company, serving in that role until his death in 1927.

=== Political career ===
Stewart was the New York County representative to the Republican State Committee, serving as its treasurer. He was also a delegate to the National Republican Conventions in 1896 and 1900 and a presidential elector in 1888 where he acted as Secretary of the Electoral College.

From January 1, 1890, succeeding Cornelius Van Cott who became Postmaster of New York City, he served in the 112th and 113th New York State Legislatures as a New York State Senator representing the 8th District (16th and part of the 9th, 15th, 18th, 20th and 21st Ward of New York City). He ended his service on December 31, 1891, and was succeeded by Martin T. McMahon.

=== Boards and clubs ===
From its inception in 1890, he was a director and a stockholder of the Real Estate Trust Company (later known as the Fulton Trust Company in 1906). He was also a trustee of Grant Monument Association, president of New York State Prison Commission from 1895 to 1903, director of New York Prison Reform Association, of New York Eye and Ear Infirmary (which he served as vice-president of the board from 1905 to 1908 and president from 1908 to 1919), of Protestant Episcopal Church Missionary Society for Seamen of the City and Port of New York from 1883 until 1901, and of the Roosevelt Hospital from 1909 until 1919.

Stewart was also a manager of New York Zoological Society, a member of the committee which erected the Washington Square Arch (led by his brother William), president of Newport Golf Club from 1907 to 1910, a governor of the Newport Casino from 1911 to 1921, of the Newport Reading Room from 1902 to 1923, of the Spouting Rock Fishing Club from 1900 to 1922, and of the Clambake Club of Newport.

== Personal life ==
He was a member of Grace Church in New York City and Trinity Church in Newport. He was a close friend of A. Lanfear Norrie, with whom he threw a 100-person dinner and evening of vaudeville before the two traveled to Mexico on vacation. He was also a friend of society fellow Harry Lehr.

He also owned a "cottage" called "White Lodge" on Bellevue Avenue in Newport, Rhode Island, where he entertained regularly. In 1897, he entertained Jennie Tuttle Hobart and Garret Hobart, the then Vice President of the United States at his home in Newport. Other guests included Gov. Elisha Dyer, Sen. Chauncey Depew, Mrs. Astor, Anthony Joseph Drexel, Jr., and Marion Graves Anthon Fish, among others.

Stewart, who did not marry, died at his home, 6 Fifth Avenue, on October 15, 1927. He had been an invalid for several years. His funeral was held at Grace Church and he was buried at Green-Wood Cemetery in Brooklyn. He left the bulk of his estate to his brother and sister and their descendants.

New York State Senate
| Preceded by Cornelius Van Cott | New York State Senate; 8th District; 1890–1891 | Succeeded by Martin T. McMahon |
