= Preservation Society of Newport County =

Non-profit organization

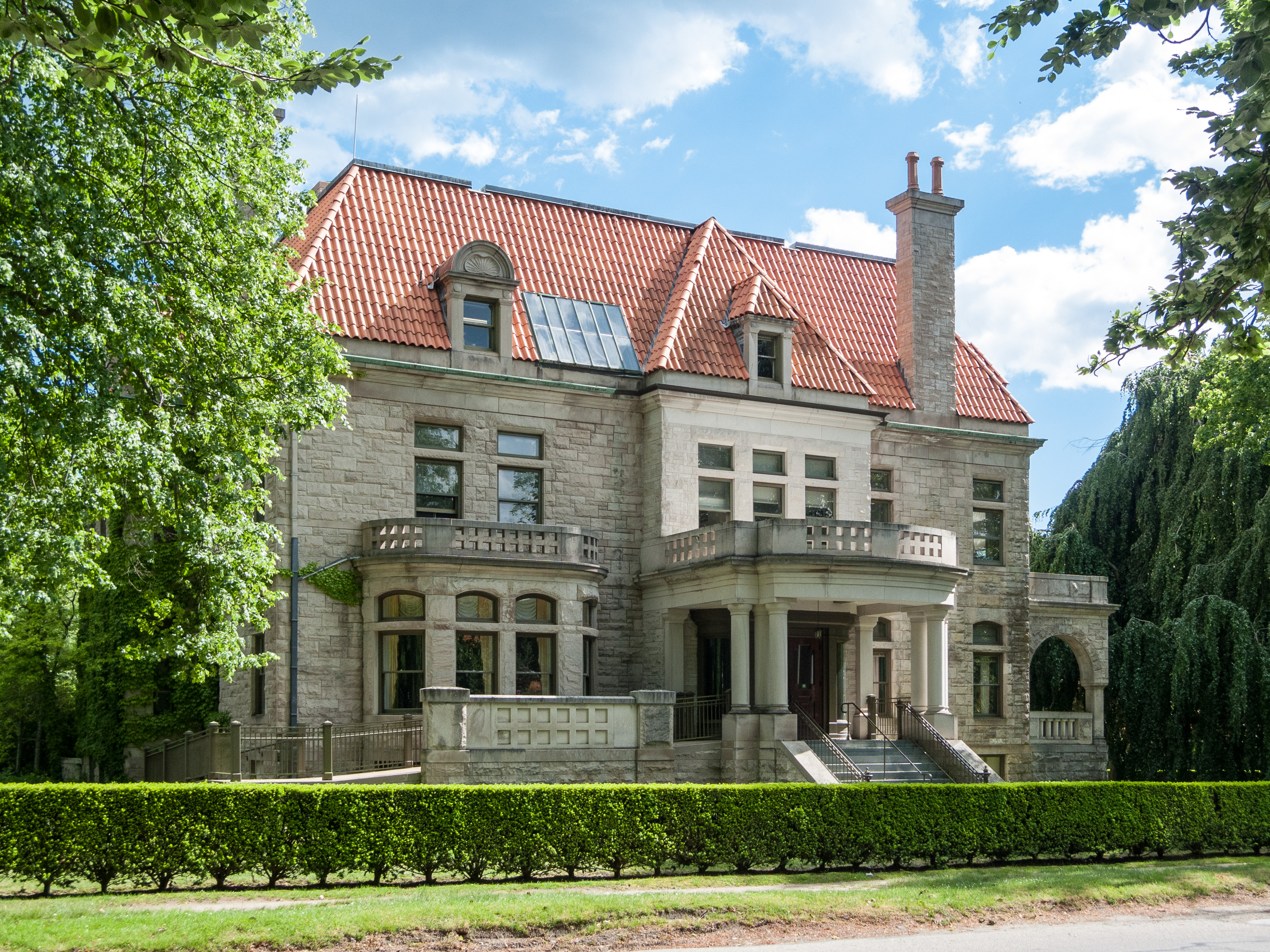
- Preservation Society Headquarters, Osgood-Pell House
- Founded: 1945
- Founder: Katherine Warren
- Type: non-profit
- Purpose: Preserve a collection of historic house museums in Newport County
- Headquarters: Bellevue Avenue, Newport, Rhode Island
- Region served: Newport County, Rhode Island
- CEO & Executive Director: Trudy Coxe
- Website: newportmansions.org

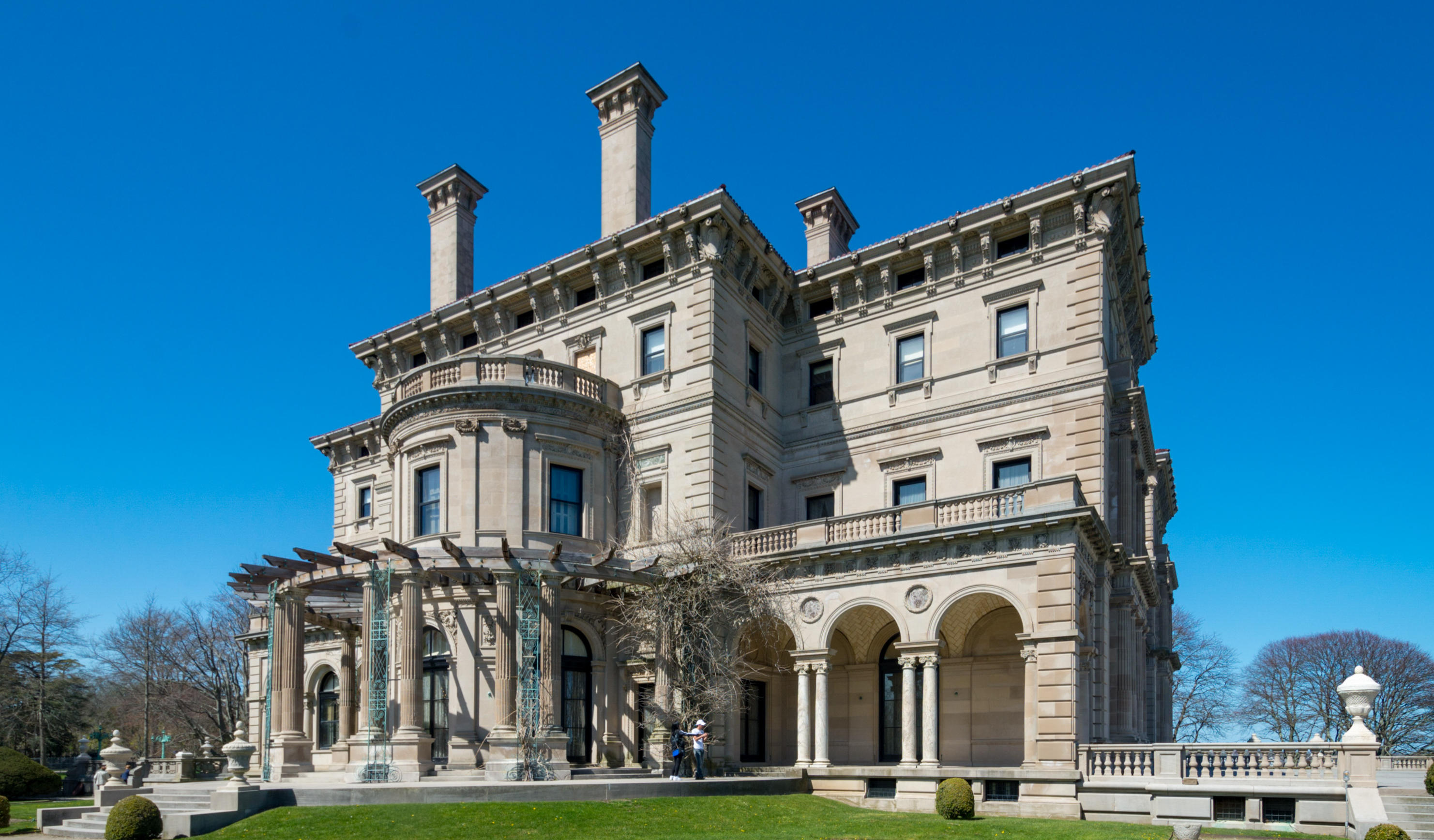
The largest of the Preservation Society's mansions, The Breakers

The Preservation Society of Newport County is a private, non-profit organization based in Newport, Rhode Island. It is Rhode Island's largest and most-visited cultural organization. The organization protects the architectural heritage of Newport County, especially the Bellevue Avenue Historic District. Seven of its 14 historic properties and landscapes are National Historic Landmarks, and most are open to the public.

The organization has filed lawsuits to block offshore wind farms in Rhode Island, arguing that wind farms harm scenic views and threaten "historic resources". In October 2026, parties agreed to dismiss the Preservation Society's claims challenging offshore wind with prejudice.

== History ==
The Preservation Society of Newport County was founded in 1945 by a group of Newport residents led by Katherine and George Warren to save Hunter House from demolition. They were known as the Georgian Society until they changed their name to the Preservation Society of Newport County.

Gertrude Conaway Vanderbilt, Harold Stirling Vanderbilt's widow, bequeathed $1.25 million to the society upon her death in 1978.

== Properties open to the public ==
Image	Name	Year built (*circa)	Style	Architect	Refs
more images	Arnold Burying Ground	Founded 1675	Cemetery		
more images	The Breakers	1895	Neo Italian Renaissance	Richard Morris Hunt	
more images	Chateau-sur-Mer	1852 (remodeled 1870s)		Seth C. Bradford (construction); Richard Morris Hunt (renovations); Ogden Codman, Jr. (design)	
more images	Chepstow	1860	Italianate	George Champlin Mason Sr. John Grovesnor (1978 addition)	
more images	The Elms	1901	Classical Revival	Horace Trumbauer	
	Green Animals Topiary Garden	c. 1860	Victorian	Joseph Carreiro, George Mendonca (Gardeners)	
more images	Hunter House	1748–1754	Georgian		
more images	Isaac Bell House	1883	Shingle style	McKim, Mead and White	
more images	Kingscote	1839 (remodeled 1870s, remodeled 1880s)	Gothic Revival	Richard Upjohn; George C. Mason (1870s renovation); McKim, Mead and White (1880s renovation)	
Marble House, Newport RI more images	Marble House	1892	Beaux-Arts	Richard Morris Hunt	
more images	Rosecliff	1902	French Baroque Revival	McKim, Mead & White	

== Former properties ==
Image	Name	Year built (*circa)	Style	Architect	Notes
Bliss House more images	John Bliss House	1679-80	colonial, stone-ender, Jacobin	Bliss, John	Restored by the PSNC in 1947, but now privately owned residence
more images	Malbone Castle	1849 (remodeled 1875)	Gothic Revival	Alexander Jackson Davis; Dudley Newton (renovations}	Bequeathed to the PSNC in 1978, later sold as a private residence; not open to the public
more images	White Horse Tavern	1652–1673	colonial	Francis Brinley, William Mayes	Restored by the PSNC in 1952, but now privately owned and operated as a working tavern

== See also ==
- Antoinette Downing
- Katherine Urquhart Warren
- List of historical societies in Rhode Island
