= Anita de Braganza =

American socialite and heiress

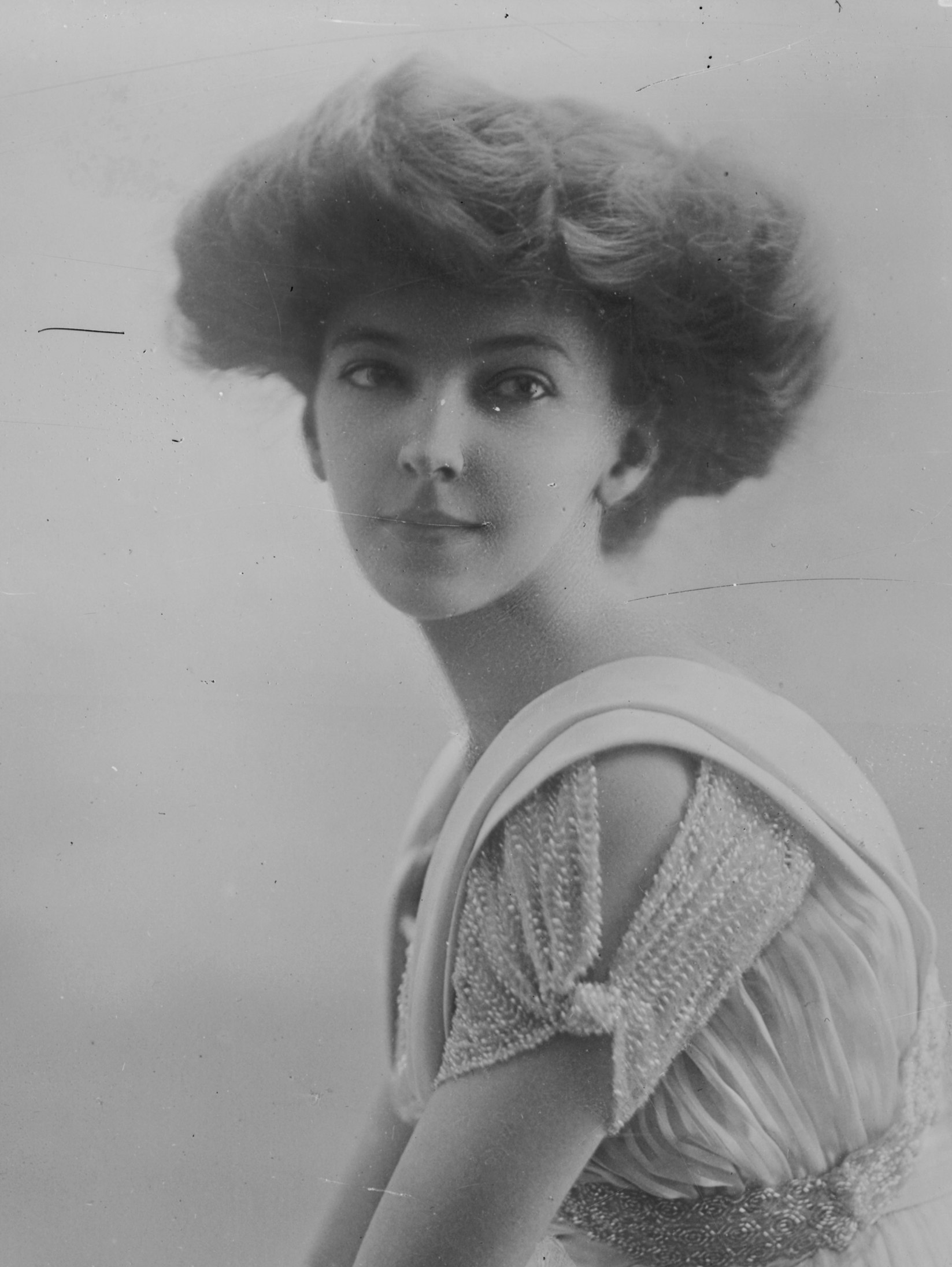
- Born: Anita Rhinelander Stewart; August 7, 1886; Elberon, New Jersey, U.S.
- Died: September 15, 1977 (aged 91); Newport, Rhode Island, U.S.
- Other names: Princess Miguel of Braganza; Anita Stewart Morris
- Title: Princess Miguel of Braganza, Duchess of Viseu
- Spouses: Prince Miguel, Duke of Viseu (m. 1909; died 1923) Lewis Gouverneur Morris II (m. 1946; died 1967)
- Children: Isabel de Bragança; John de Bragança; Miguel de Bragança
- Parent(s): Anne McKee Armstrong; William Rhinelander Stewart Sr.
- Relatives: Lispenard Stewart (uncle)

Anita Rhinelander Morris (August 7, 1886 – September 15, 1977) was an American socialite and heiress who married Prince Miguel, Duke of Viseu, grandson of King Miguel I of Portugal, and the eldest son of Dom Miguel, Duke of Braganza, who was Miguelist claimant to the throne of Portugal from 1866 to 1920.

== Early life ==
Anita Rhinelander Stewart was born in Elberon, New Jersey, on August 7, 1886. She was the daughter of Anne "Annie" McKee Armstrong (1864–1925) and William Rhinelander Stewart, Sr. (1852–1929), a wealthy descendant of an old Knickerbocker family. She had one sibling, William Rhinelander Stewart, Jr., a philanthropist and President of the New York State Board of Charities.

Her father was an attorney who managed several trusts for his family. Her parents divorced in August 1906, and afterwards, her mother married Wall Street millionaire James Henry Smith. Smith died in Japan in 1907 while on their honeymoon. Her mother then married New York socialite Jean de Saint Cyr (1875–1966) on April 25, 1915.

Her paternal uncle was the New York State Senator Lispenard Stewart Jr. (1855–1927).

Her maternal aunt was Margarita "Rita" Armstrong (1867–1948), who married firstly Anthony Joseph Drexel Jr. and secondly Lt.-Col. Brinsley FitzGerald, son of Sir Peter FitzGerald, 1st Bt. and 19th Knight of Kerry.

Her paternal grandparents were Lispenard Stewart (1809–1867, a great-grandson of Col. Leonard Lispenard and grandnephew of Continental Congressman Lt.-Col. Charles Stewart) and Mary Rogers (née Rhinelander) Stewart (1821–1893), a first cousin of the prominent New York society figure and president of the Metropolitan Museum of Art Frederic W. Rhinelander. Her maternal grandparents were John Armstrong (1823–1884), of the Baltimore prominent Armstrong family, and Margaretta (née McKee) Armstrong (1833–1900), daughter of Col. William R. McKee and Ann (née Alricks) McKee.

Anita Rhinelander Stewart was furthermore a descendant, in legitimate lineage, of King James I of Scotland by his wife Joan Beaufort, through their daughter Annabella Gordon, Countess of Huntly.

== Career ==
After her husband died in 1923, in order to regain her American citizenship (as well as for her children), Anita had to renounce her royal title. However, New York society continued to refer to her with her regal title.

Following her second marriage, she continued to operate a photography studio in Manhattan and spend time at Malbone, their Gothic Revival estate in Newport, Rhode Island.

== Personal life ==
On September 15, 1909, Stewart married Prince Miguel, Duke of Viseu (1878–1923) at St. Lawrence's Catholic Church in Dingwall, Scotland, with the reception at Dingwall Castle. On September 6, a week preceding her wedding, Franz Joseph I, the Emperor of Austria, bestowed the title of Prinzessin von Braganza (Princess of Braganza) on her, and in her own right, ensuring that Prince Miguel would not have to renounce his title. Her husband was the eldest son of Prince Miguel, Duke of Braganza and Princess Elisabeth of Thurn and Taxis. In order to get the consent of his father to marry Anita, Prince Miguel had to renounce all claim to the throne of Portugal in favor of his younger brother, Prince Francis Joseph. Out of this union, three children were born, all of whom used the title Prince or Princess until July 1920 when Prince Miguel renounced, for himself and his descendants, his rights of succession to the Portuguese throne:

- Isabel "Nadejda" de Bragança (1910–1946), who married Włodzimierz "Vadim" Dorozynski (1906–1933), son of a Polish-Russian naval officer, on August 16, 1930, in Capri, Italy. They divorced in 1932 and in 1942, she married French Partisan René Millet (1910–1978), later Ambassador of France to Chad, Kenya and Burma.
- John de Bragança (1912–1991), who married Winifred Dodge Seyburn (1917–2010) in 1948, with one son (Miguel). They divorced in 1953 and in 1971, he was married to Katharine (née King) Bahnson (1921–2007).
- Miguel de Bragança (1915–1996), a St. George's School graduate, who married Anne Hughson (1921–2017) in 1946, with two daughters (Anita and Michele).

In 1946, Anita married Lewis Gouverneur Morris II (1882–1967), the son of Francis Morris and Harriet Hall (née Bedlow) Morris, in New York City.

Anita died at the age of 91, on September 15, 1977 (68 years to the day of her first marriage), at her home in Newport, Rhode Island.

== Ancestry ==
Ancestors of Anita de Braganza

8. Alexander L. Stewart; (1775–1838)
4. Lispenard Stewart (1809–1867)
9. Sarah Lispenard
2. William Rhinelander Stewart, Sr. (1852–1929)
10. William Christopher Rhinelander; (1790–1878)
5. Mary Rogers Rhinelander (1821–1893)
11. Mary Rogers
1. Princess Anita de Braganza
6. John A. Armstrong (1823–1884)
3. Anne "Annie" McKee Armstrong (1864–1925)
14. Col. William R. McKee
7. Margaretta McKee (1833–1900)
15. Ann Alricks
