= Lewis G. Morris House =

Historic house in Manhattan, New York

- U.S. National Register of Historic Places
- U.S. Historic district – Contributing property
- New York State Register of Historic Places
- New York City Landmark
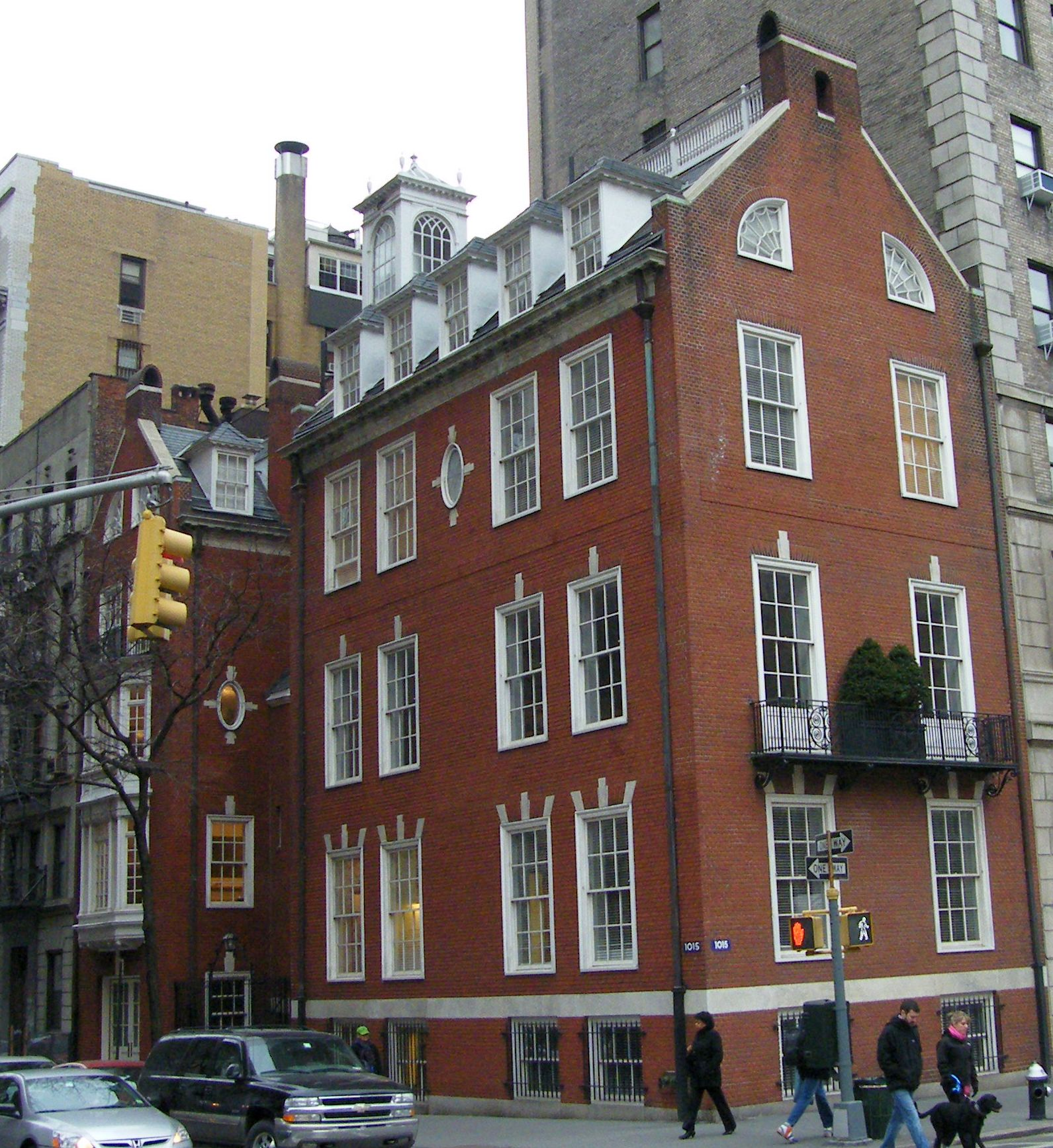

- Location within Manhattan Location within New York City Location within New York Location within the United States
- Location: 100 East 85th Street, New York, New York
- Coordinates: 40°46′46″N 73°57′28″W
- Area: less than one acre
- Built: 1914
- Architect: Ernest Flagg
- Architectural style: Neo-Federal
- Part of: Park Avenue Historic District (ID10000588)
- NRHP reference No.: 77000960
- NYSRHP No.: 06101.001720
- NYCL No.: 0654

Significant dates
- Added to NRHP: February 12, 1977
- Designated NYSRHP: June 23, 1980
- Designated NYCL: January 24, 1967

The Lewis Gouverneur and Nathalie Bailey Morris House is a historic building at 100 East 85th Street on the Upper East Side of Manhattan in New York City. The five-story dark red brick house was built in 1913-14 as a private residence for Lewis Gouverneur Morris, a financier and descendant of Gouverneur Morris, a signer of the Articles of Confederation and United States Constitution, and Alletta Nathalie Lorillard Bailey. In 1917, Morris & Pope (Lewis Governeur Morris’ stock brokerage firm) is bankrupt but the family retains ownership of this house as well as their house in Newport, RI because his wife owned the property as collateral for a loan to him for his brokerage business. Alletta Nathalie Bailey Morris was a leading women's tennis player in the 1910s, winning the national indoor tennis championship in 1920.

Designed by Ernest Flagg with an asymmetrical plan, the house has a distinctive style inspired by English Queen Anne architecture, along with Colonial and Federal architectural styles. The building features staggered stair windows, half-fan windows in pairs, a double height oriel over the garage, and a square cupola.

The building was later also called the New World Foundation Building. Its address is 1015 Park Avenue, although its entrance is around the corner at 100 East 85th Street. The house was made a New York City Designated Landmark on January 24, 1967, and was added to the National Register of Historic Places in 1977. Its facade was restored by the Avi Chai Foundation in 2000.

== See also ==
- List of New York City Designated Landmarks in Manhattan from 59th to 110th Streets
- National Register of Historic Places listings in Manhattan from 59th to 110th Streets
