= Malbone Castle and Estate =

Historic house in Rhode Island, United States

- Malbone
- U.S. National Register of Historic Places
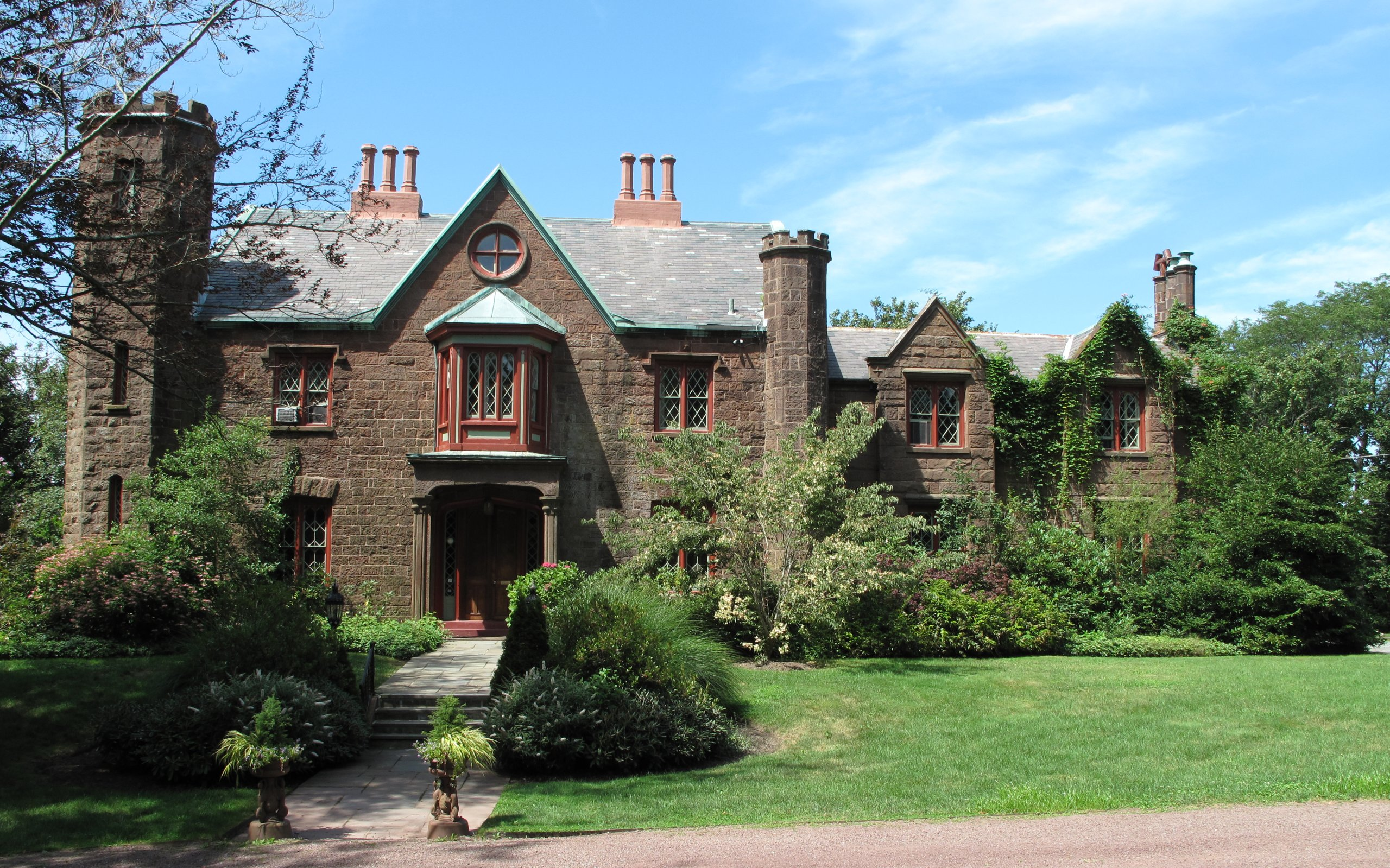
- Malbone Castle (2013)

- Location within Rhode Island Location within the United States
- Location: 90 Malbone Road, Newport, Rhode Island
- Coordinates: 41°30′18.02″N 71°18′35.55″W
- Built: 1849
- Architect: A. J. Davis; Dudley Newton
- Architectural style: Gothic Revival
- NRHP reference No.: 76000039
- Added to NRHP: October 22, 1976

Malbone is one of the oldest mansions in Newport, Rhode Island. The original mid-18th century estate was the country residence of Col. Godfrey Malbone of Virginia and Connecticut. The main house burned down during a dinner party in 1766 and the remaining structure sat dormant for many years until New York lawyer Jonathan Prescott Hall built a new roughly 5,800 ft^{2} (540 m^{2}) castellated residence directly on top of the old ivy-covered ruins.

== History ==
Located on Malbone Road, the estate has a history dating to the mid-18th century, but the present main house was built in 1848–49. The estate once served as the country residence of Colonel Godfrey Malbone (1695–1768) of Virginia and Connecticut. Colonel Malbone made his fortune as a shipping merchant and slave trader, becoming one of the wealthiest men in Newport during the 1740s through privateering and the triangle trade. Malbone's 1741 mansion was designed by Richard Munday, a noted colonial architect who also designed Newport landmarks Trinity Church and the Old Colony House. The mansion was so grand that it was widely considered the finest house in all of the American colonies.

Future President George Washington boarded and dined at Malbone in February 1756 when he visited Col. Malbone, who was Washington's friend dating back to Malbone's childhood in Virginia. In 1766, during the course of a gala dinner party, a kitchen fire reduced the house to a pile of sandstone rubble. By several accounts, Colonel Malbone, seeing no reason why the party should be interrupted, ordered dinner to be served outside, proclaiming, "By God, if I must lose my house, I shall not lose my dinner!"

From 1766, the year of the fire, until the 1840s, the ruins of Malbone's estate was a popular attraction among Newporters.

=== 1840s mansion ===
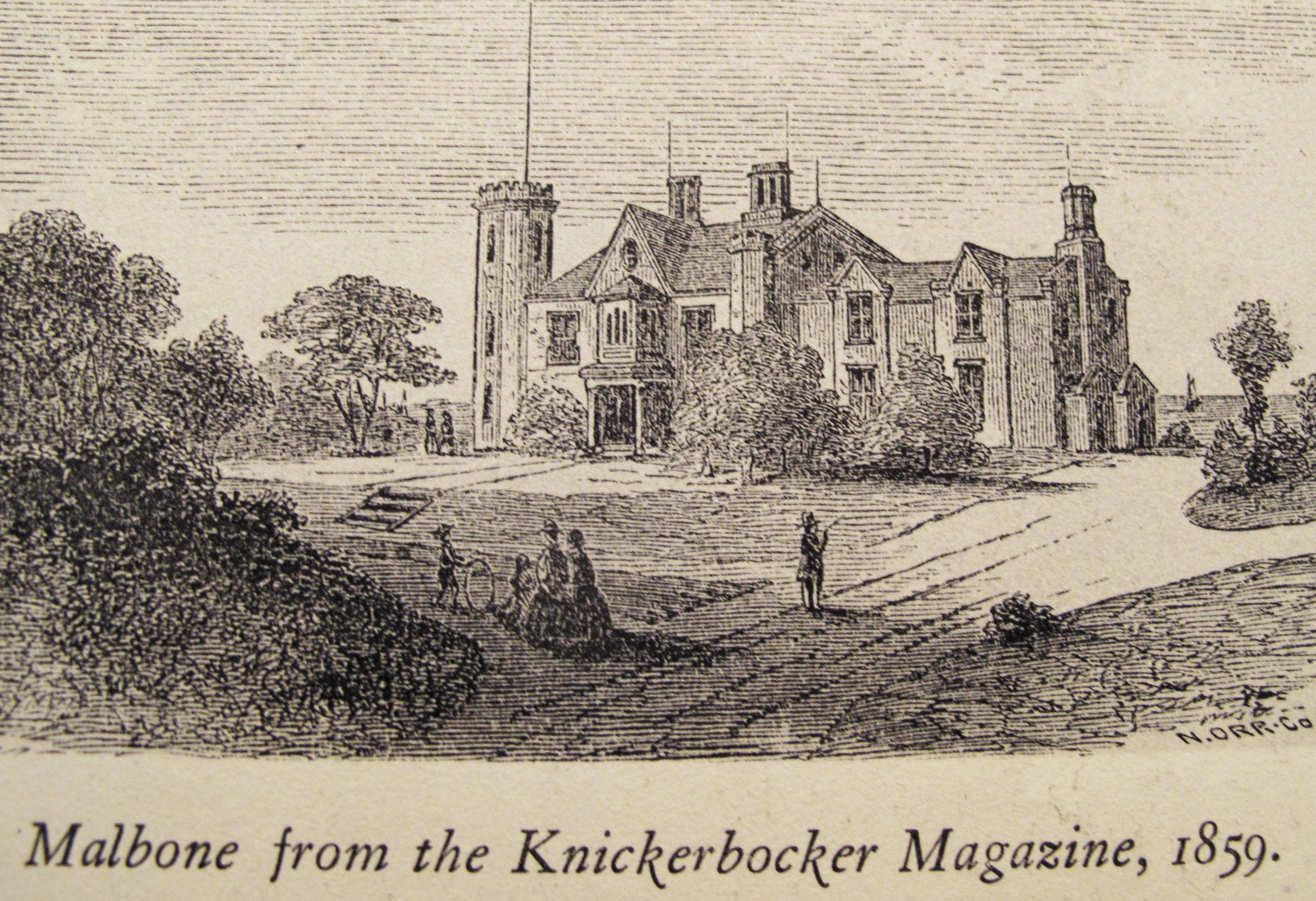
Malbone Castle as printed in The Architectural Heritage of Newport Rhode Island 1640 - 1915 (and credited originally from the Knickerbocker Magazine, 1859).

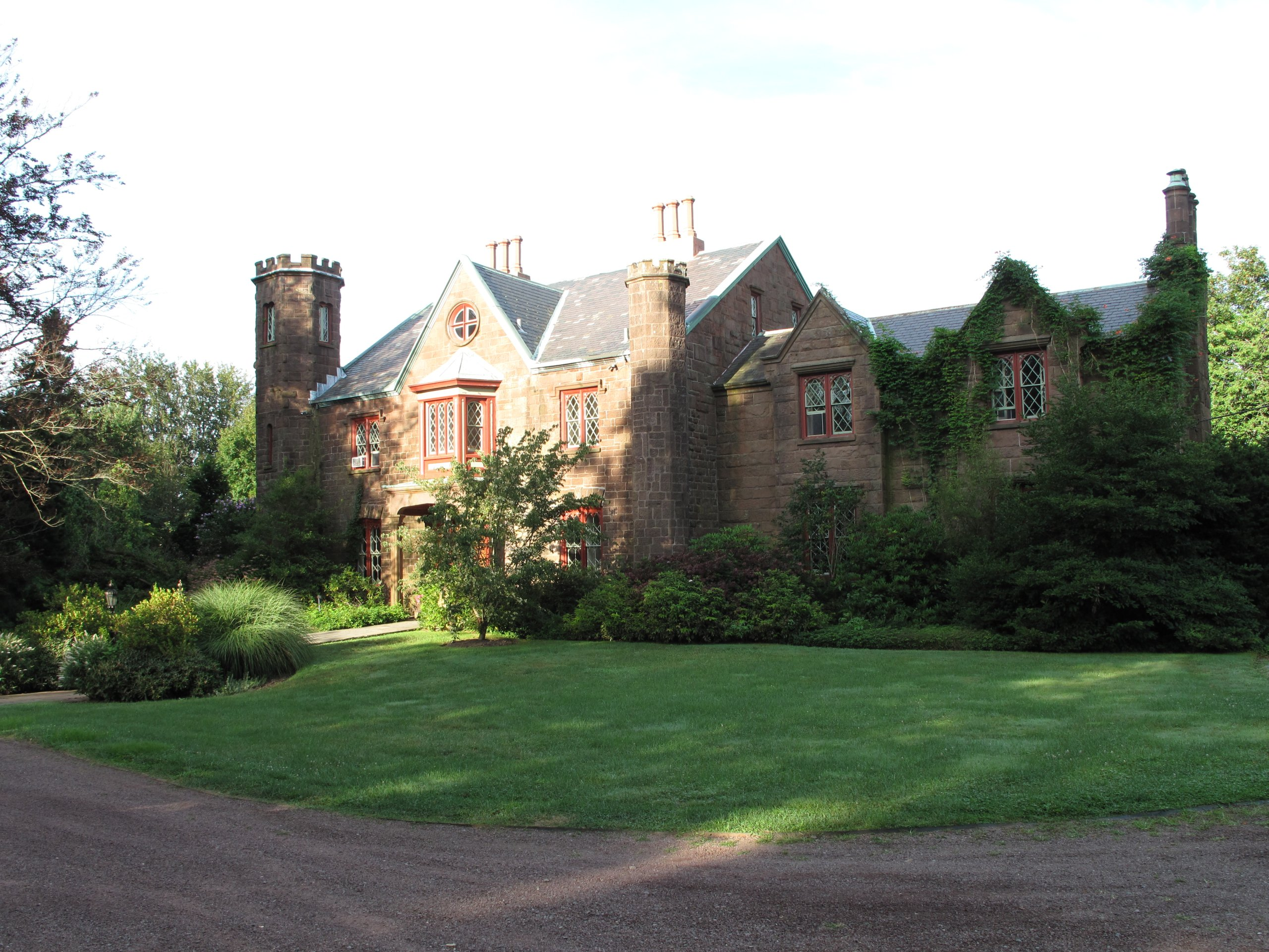
Malbone in 2013

In 1848 a new mansion was built directly on top of the old ivy-covered ruins by Mr. & Mrs. Jonathan Prescott Hall. Hall was an eminent New York lawyer and direct descendant of two signers of the Declaration of Independence.

The Halls commissioned Alexander Jackson Davis, a notable 19th-century New York architect, to design a house of pink Connecticut sandstone in the popular Gothic Revival style of the time, incorporating some original elements such as the porte-cochere from the previous home. Hall, the United States Attorney for the Southern District of New York, died in September 1862. In 1875, the house's interiors were remodeled under the supervision of noted local architect Dudley Newton who added a "massive carved oak staircase." The mansion remained in the same family for over 130 years, serving as the summer "cottage" of the Morris-Bedlow family (including Lewis Gouverneur Morris), a prominent family from New York who held positions of social and political prominence in America and Newport in the 18th and 19th centuries.

Malbone Estate had some of the most prominent formal gardens in America during the 18th and 19th centuries. The gardens were originally established by Col. Malbone to the south of the house because it was from this direction that visitors and merchants from Newport town would approach the estate. Prescott Hall renovated these gardens from 1848 to 1850, expanding them to 17 acres and enlisting Andrew Jackson Downing, the leading landscape designer of the 1840s and an advocate of architectural philosophy. Downing partnered with Calvert Vaux to design the White House grounds and National Mall and is widely regarded as the "Father of American Landscape Architecture." The Malbone Gardens have been recently restored with an emphasis on the brick pathways lined by boxwoods, the central stone waterway, four prominent weeping beech trees, and the carriage path lined by European beech trees, all remnants of Downing's original 1848 design.

Most recently, Malbone Estate was a filming location in The Gilded Age.

=== Current ownership ===
The property was listed on the National Register of Historic Places in 1976. The grounds of the estate "contain the largest collection of European beech trees in North America."

The Morris family bequeathed Malbone to the Preservation Society of Newport County in 1978, who sold the estate to Patricia and Philip Archer Thomas in 1980. Around 1994, the 17 acres (6.9 ha) Malbone estate was acquired by James Leach, who hosted U.S. Supreme Court Justice Ruth Bader Ginsburg there in 2004. In 2013, Leach listed the estate for sale for $2.2 million; the house remains a private residence to this day.

== Gallery ==
Exterior photographs from 1933 (Library of Congress)

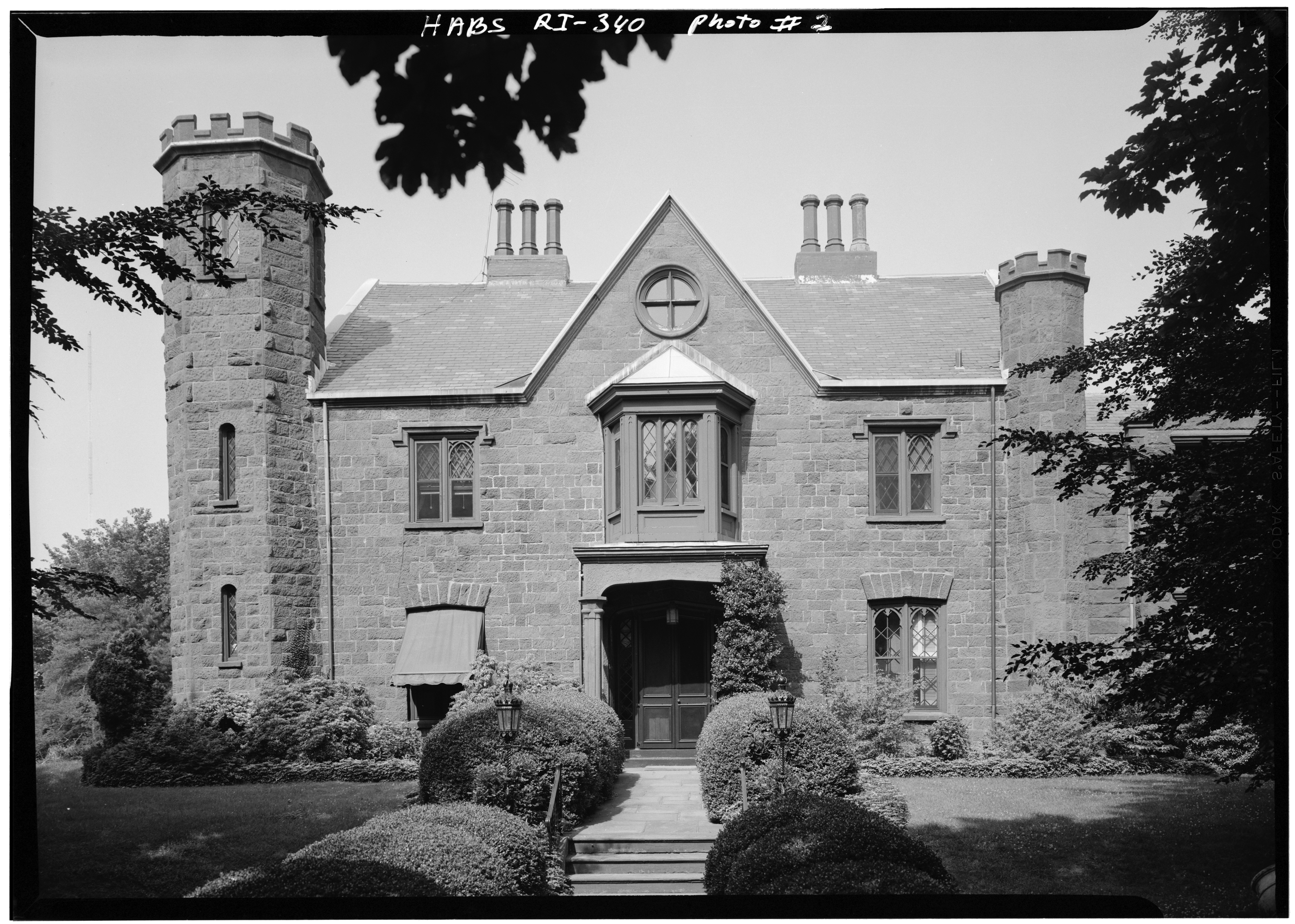
East front, looking West

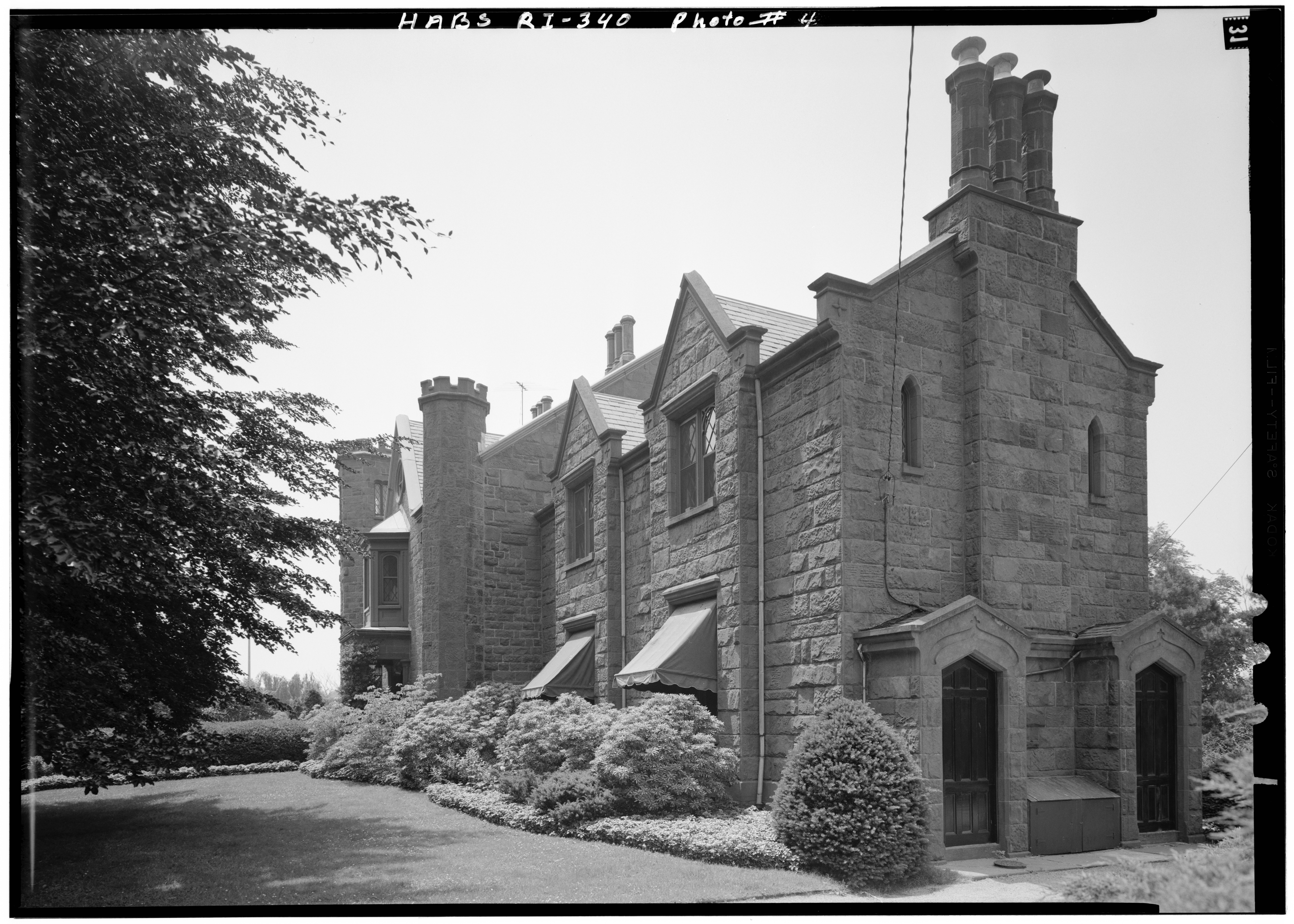
Dining room wing from the Northeast

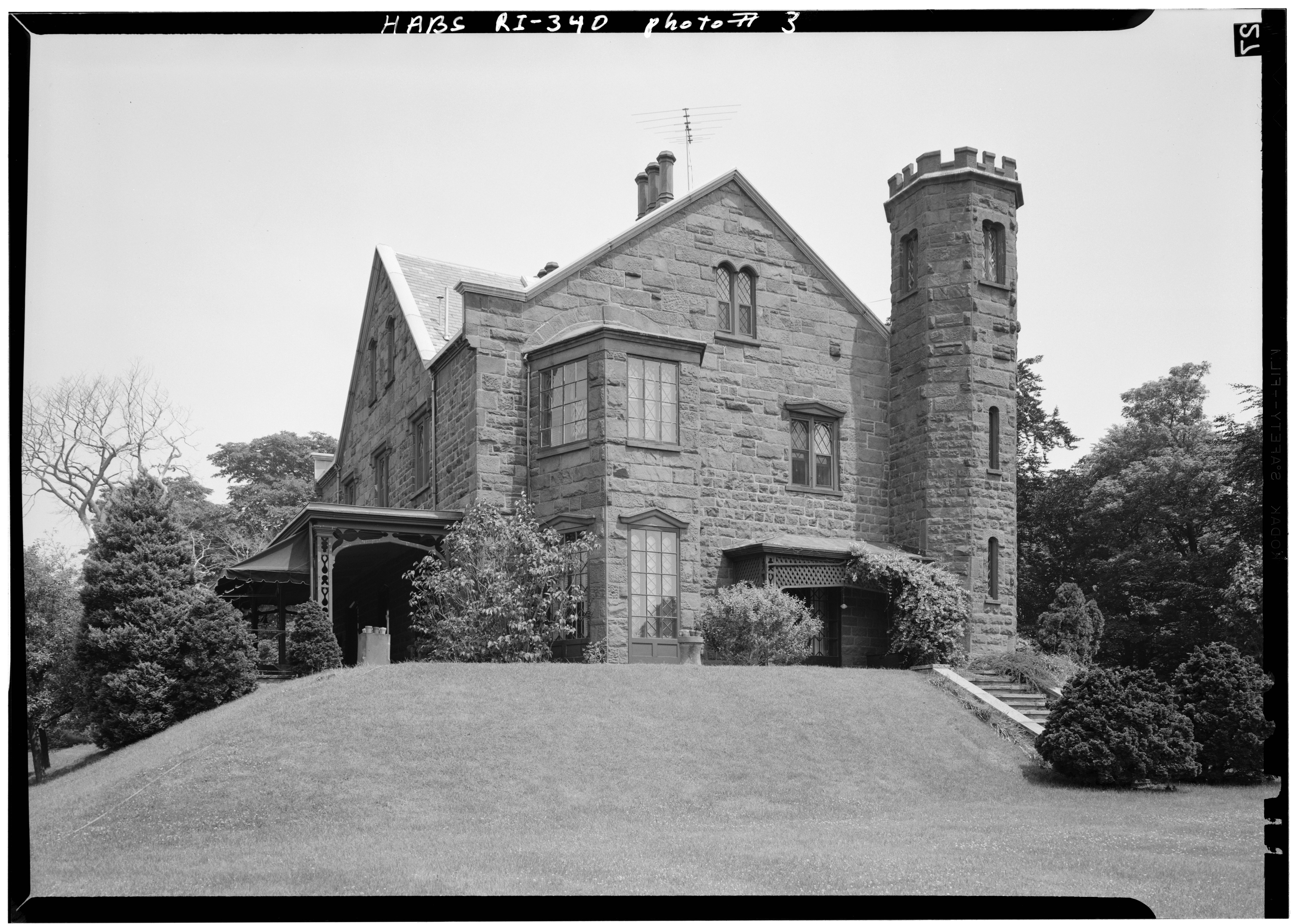
South flank from the Southwest

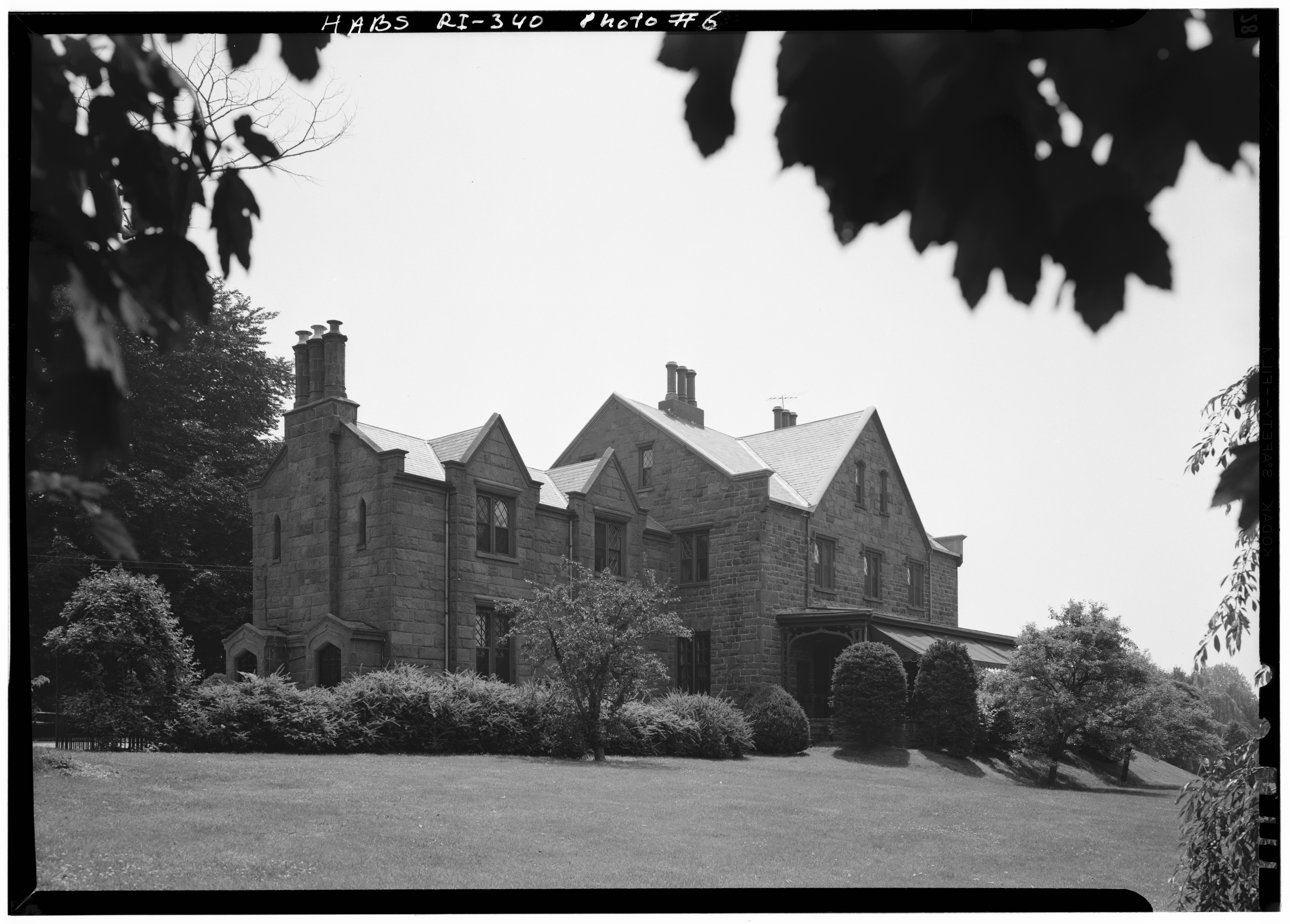
West flank from the Northwest

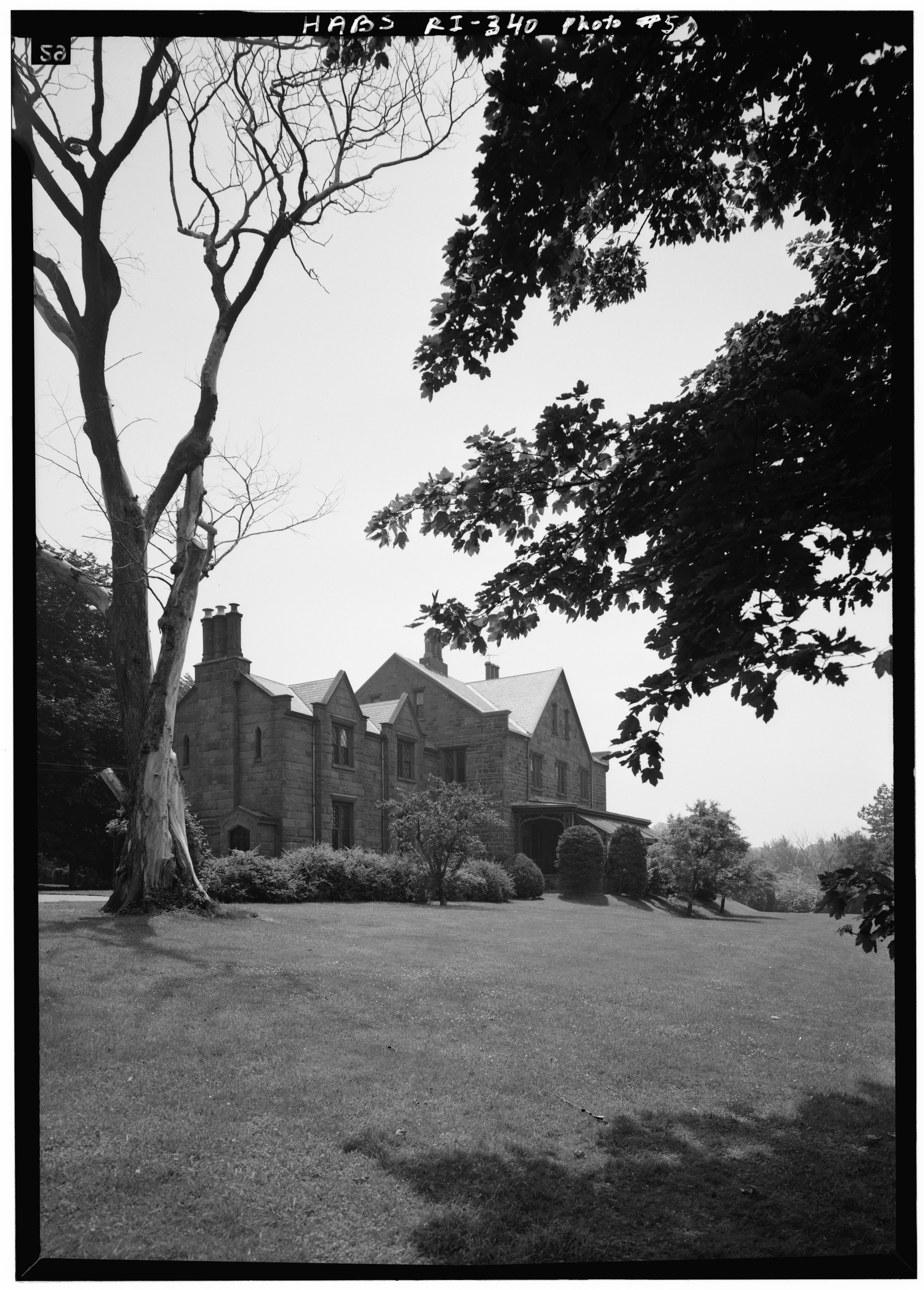
West flank from the Northwest

Interior photographs from 1933 (Library of Congress)

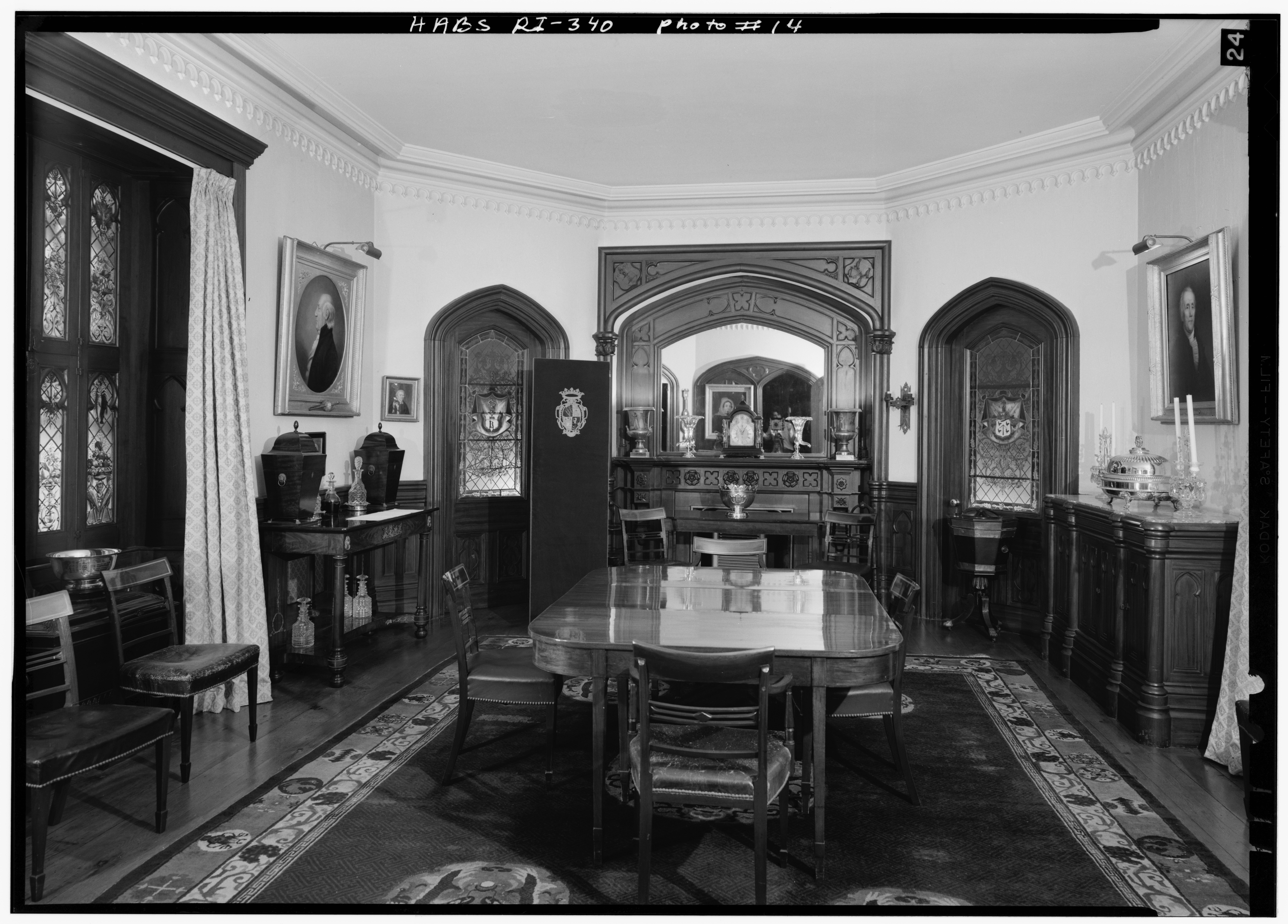
Dining room

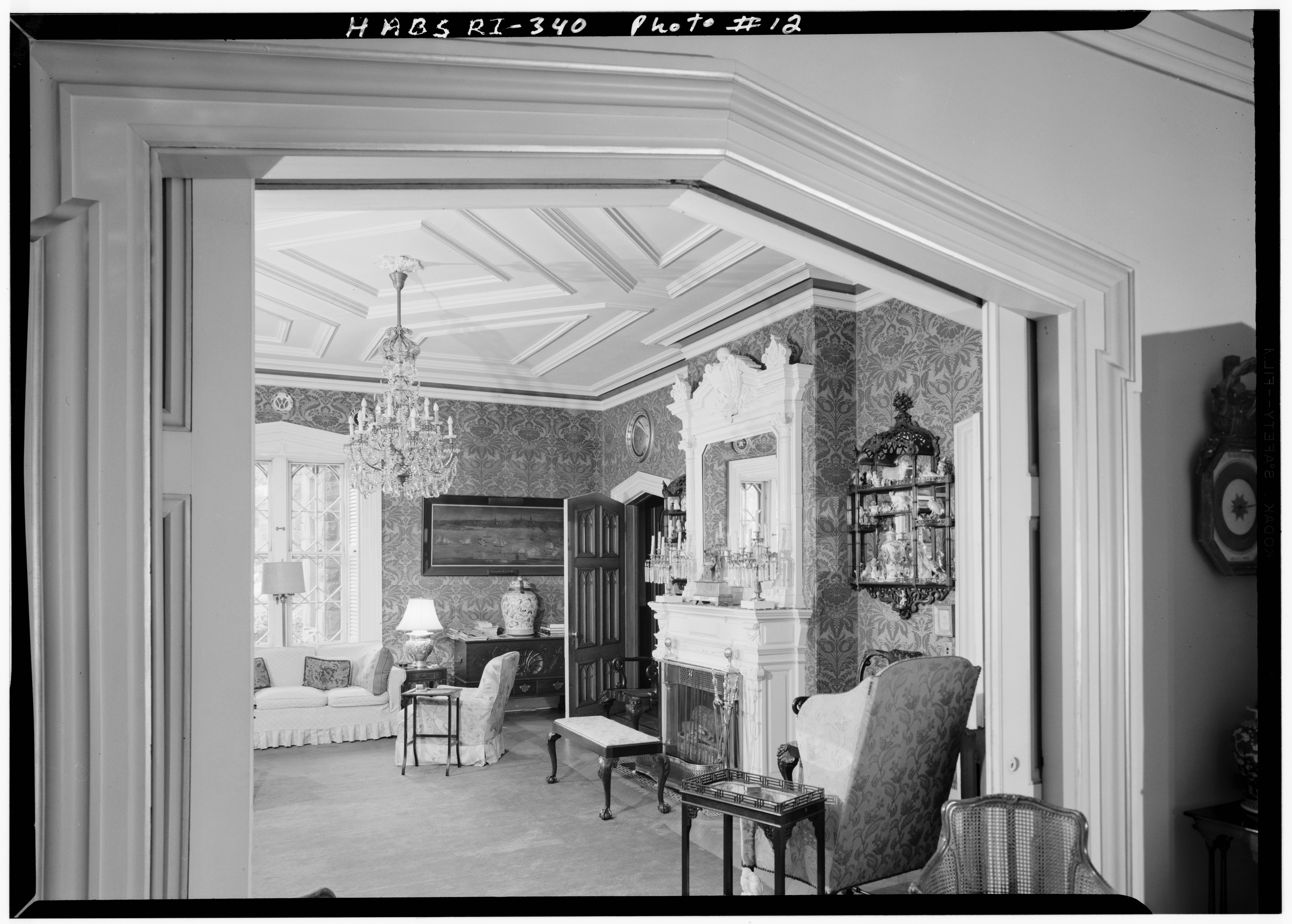
North parlor

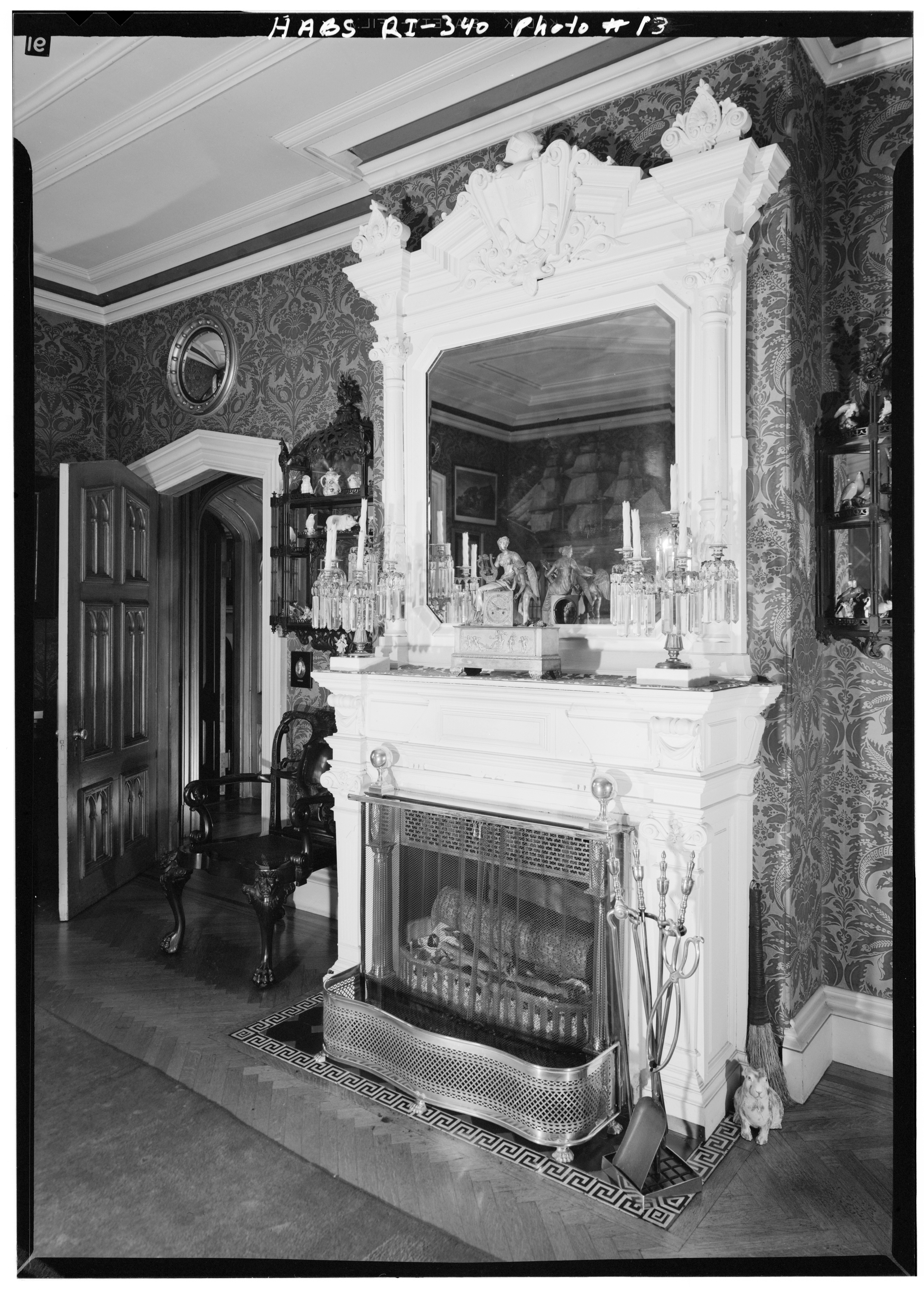
North parlor fireplace

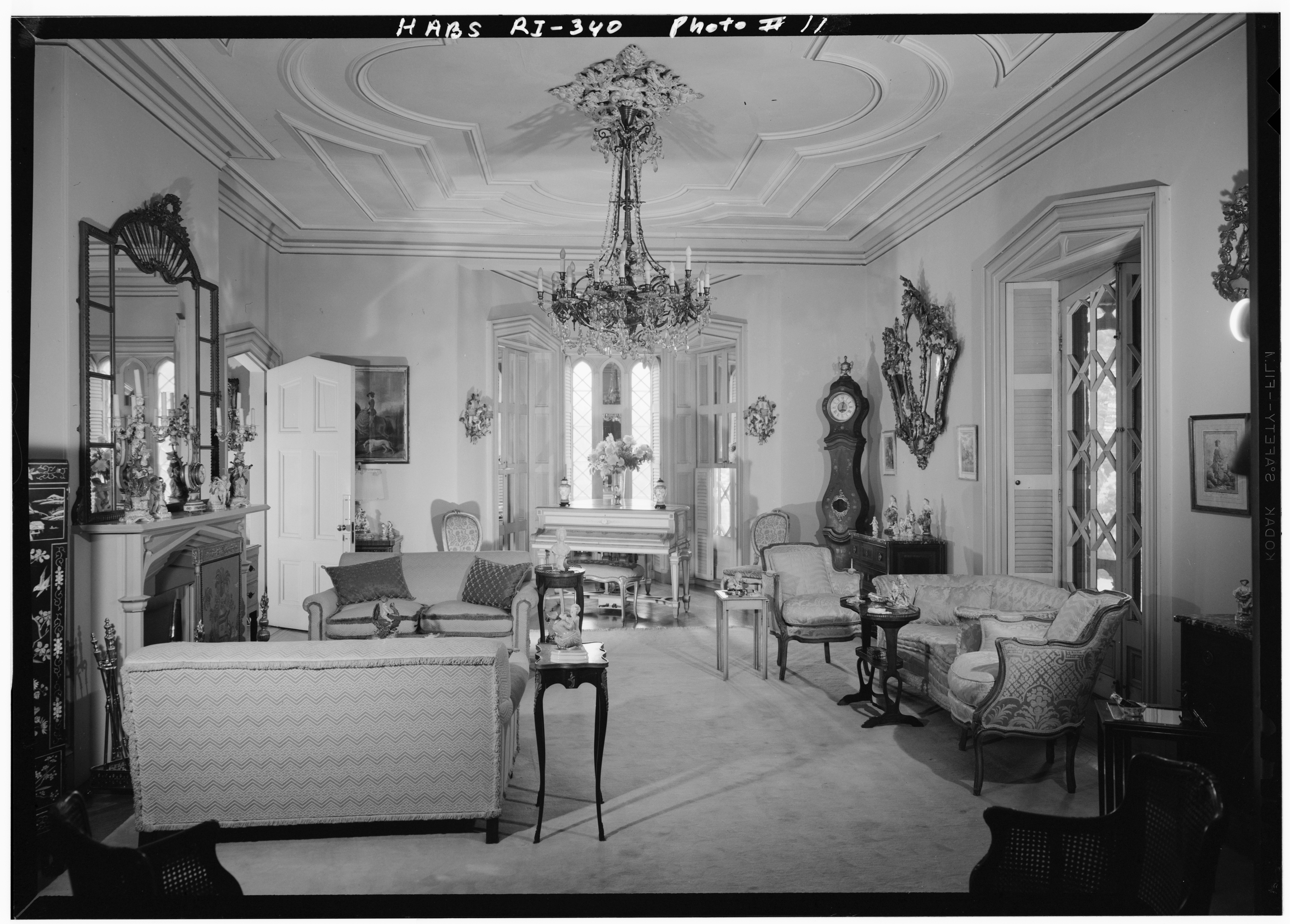
Front hall

== See also ==
- National Register of Historic Places listings in Newport County, Rhode Island
