= Artillery Company of Newport =

- Newport Artillery Company Armory
- U.S. National Register of Historic Places
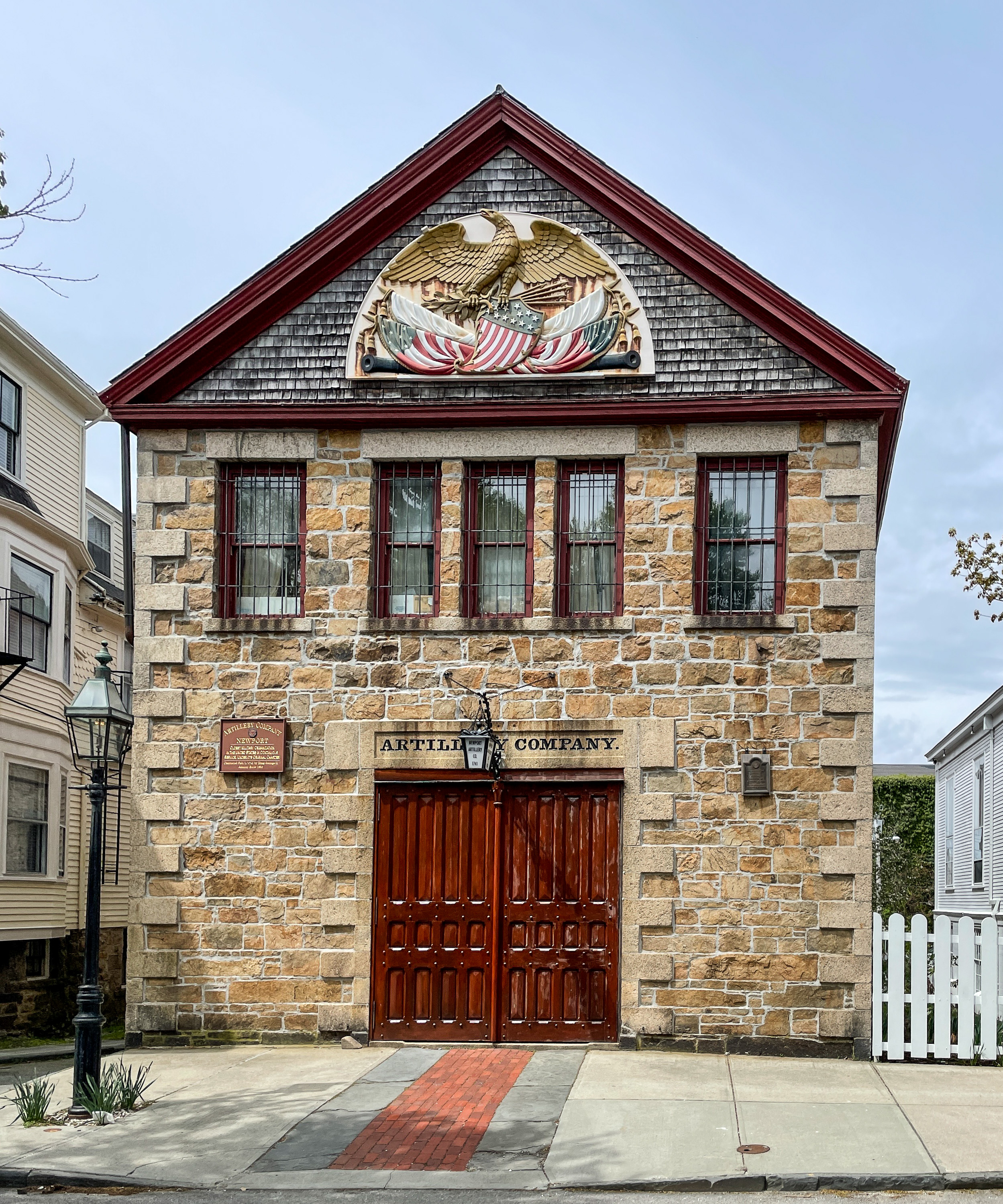

- Location within Rhode Island Location within the United States
- Location: Newport, Rhode Island
- Coordinates: 41°29′22″N 71°18′51″W
- Area: less than one acre
- Built: 1835
- Architect: MacGregor, Alexander; Duress & McWade
- Architectural style: Greek Revival
- NRHP reference No.: 72000029
- Added to NRHP: June 30, 1972

The Newport Artillery Company of Newport, Rhode Island was chartered in 1741 by the Rhode Island General Assembly during the reign of King George II of Great Britain. It is the oldest military unit in the United States operating under its original charter, and the company maintains a museum in its historic armory. The company has served in wars ranging from the French and Indian War to the First World War. Individual members of the Company have served in every war fought by the United States.

== Early history ==
The Newport Artillery was the first chartered independent unit in the Rhode Island Militia. Unlike most colonial era militia units, which served under officers commissioned by the governor, the Newport Artillery was granted the right to elect its own officers. It also had the privilege of being subject only to the orders of the governor, rather than the appointed officers in the colony's militia structure.

After receiving its charter from the Rhode Island General Assembly during the reign of King George II in 1741, members of the Newport Artillery served in the French and Indian War and was led by elite members of the community. Its first commanding officer was Captain Jahleel Brenton (1691–1767). Captain Brenton was the grandson of Governor William Brenton and the father of Jahleel Brenton, Jr. who became a rear admiral in the Royal Navy.

== Post Revolution ==
During the American Revolution, the British Army occupied Newport for almost three years starting in December 1776. As the members of the company had divided loyalties, the company became inactive until 1792 when Francis Malbone, who was elected to Congress the same year, asked the Rhode Island General Assembly to recognize the validity of the company's 1741 charter. The Assembly found no reason that the charter was invalid and Malbone was elected captain (i.e. commanding officer) of the company.

== 19th Century ==
Members of the company followed Newport native Commodore Oliver Hazard Perry to Put-in-Bay, Ohio and fought at the Battle of Lake Erie in September 1813.

In 1814, during the War of 1812, the company was activated and garrisoned Fort Greene in the Point section of Newport. The company was inactivated when the Treaty of Ghent, which ended the war, was signed in early 1815.

In 1834, a plot of land was donated to the company by Audley Clarke to build an armory.

During the Dorr War of 1842 to 1843, the company was one of several militia units to mobilize to suppress the rebellion against the government of Rhode Island. The Artillery Company of Newport volunteered to lead the charge against the Dorr defenses, because of this the unit has the right of line in any parade in Rhode Island to this day.

During the American Civil War, the company was mustered into Federal service as Company F of the 1st Rhode Island Infantry (a.k.a. 1st Rhode Island Detached Militia) in April 1861 under the command of Captain (later Brevet Brigadier General) George W. Tew. It fought at the Battle of Bull Run in July and was mustered out of Federal service in August. Individual members of Company F volunteered for service with other regiments after they were mustered out of service in August 1861.

Members of the Company who were unable to serve in Company F were designated as the "Old Guard" and garrisoned Fort Adams guarding the entrance to Newport Harbor from April to May 1861 when the fort became the site of the United States Naval Academy which moved to Newport for fear the Confederates would invade Maryland.

In 1862 the company was activated to provide the guard force at the newly established Lovell General Hospital at Portsmouth Grove, a few miles north of Newport. The company performed this duty until relieved by a company of hospital guards which was specially formed for this assignment.

During the Spanish–American War in 1898 the company was activated for one week and received training on coast defense guns at Fort Adams so the company could supplement the fort's garrison in the event Newport was attacked. A number of members of the Company enlisted in the 1st Rhode Island Volunteer Infantry Regiment which served stateside from 1898 to 1899.

== Early 20th Century ==
The Dick Act of 1903 required that state militia units, in order to receive Federal funding and equipment, would have to conform to Federal military regulations in order to be integrated in the National Guard. The Newport Artillery Company, along with several other Rhode Island Militia units, decided to retain the privilege under their charter of electing their own officers and voted not to become a unit of the Rhode Island National Guard.

In September 1913 the company, led by Colonel Frank P. King, went to Put in Bay, Ohio to celebrate the centennial of the Battle of Lake Erie. Unfortunately, many of the company's members were sickened by food poisoning during the trip. The company purchased historic reproduction uniforms for the occasion. These uniforms became the basis for Company's colonial uniform which is currently worn.

As the company was not part of the National Guard it was not called into Federal service during the First World War. It was, however, called into state service and guarded a railroad bridge connecting the towns of Portsmouth and Tiverton from April to June 1917. A former commander of the company, Colonel Alvin A. Barker, was placed in command of the Rhode Island State Guard (RISG). The RISG was formed to replace National Guard units which had been called into Federal service. the RISG consisted of 16 companies spread throughout the state. The Newport Artillery formed the 3rd Company in the 2nd Battalion of the RISG. The RISG was disbanded after Rhode Island National Guard units were demobilized following the implementation of the Armistice on November 11, 1918.

== Recent history ==
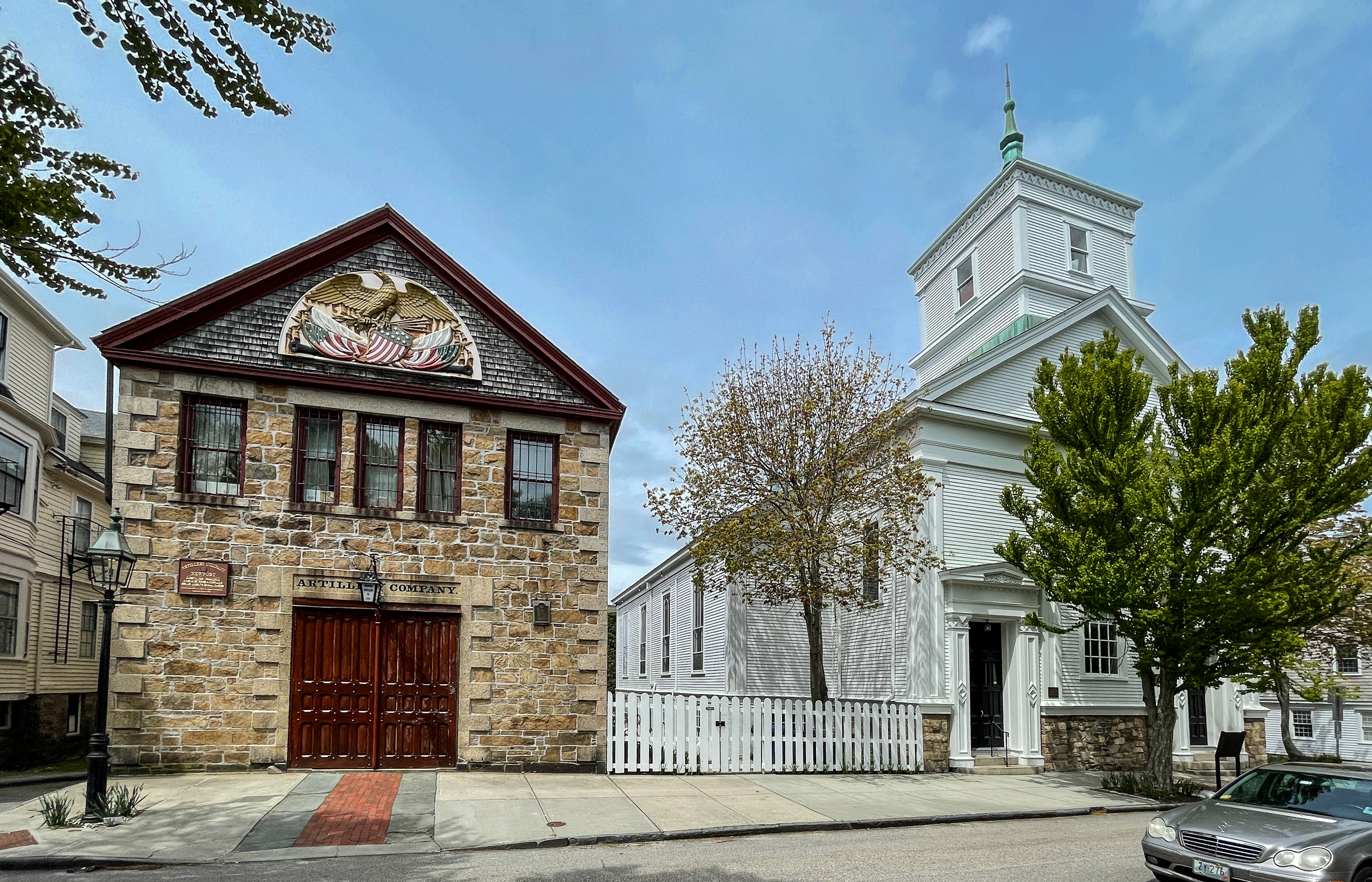
The Artillery Company is located next to the Clarke Street Meeting House

After the First World War, the Company entered a period of slow decline and was not activated during the Second World War. It was rejuvenated in the early 1960s under the leadership of tobacco heir, and Newport resident, Louis Lorillard. Outfitted with Colonial style uniforms and using original cannons, cast by Paul Revere in 1798, the company began to participate in many military and historic events. During the Bicentennial celebrations in the mid-1970s the Company played a prominent role in many events which included serving as the honor guard to Queen Elizabeth II when she visited Newport in July 1976.

Over the next few decades the company has participated in a number of annual events, including the Gaspee Days Parade in Pawtuxet Village, Rhode Island; the Summer Pops Concert in Westerly, Rhode Island, and the June Day election ceremony of the Ancient and Honorable Artillery Company of Massachusetts in Boston. The company traditionally fires a 21-gun salute to the nation every 4 July at noon at Washington Square in Newport. In 2016 the company celebrated its 275th anniversary.

== Current status ==
The Newport Artillery is a unit of the Chartered Commands of the Rhode Island Militia, of which it is the senior unit. Its officers are elected by its members and commissioned by the Governor of Rhode Island. It is also a member of the Centennial Legion of Historic Military Commands, which is composed of military organizations pre-dating 1876. It is currently very active and participates in many ceremonial events each year.

== Name ==
The official name of the company on its 1741 charter is "The Artillery Company of Town of Newport". In common practice, however, the company is referred to as the "Artillery Company of Newport", the "Newport Artillery Company" or the "Newport Artillery".

== Armory Building and Museum ==
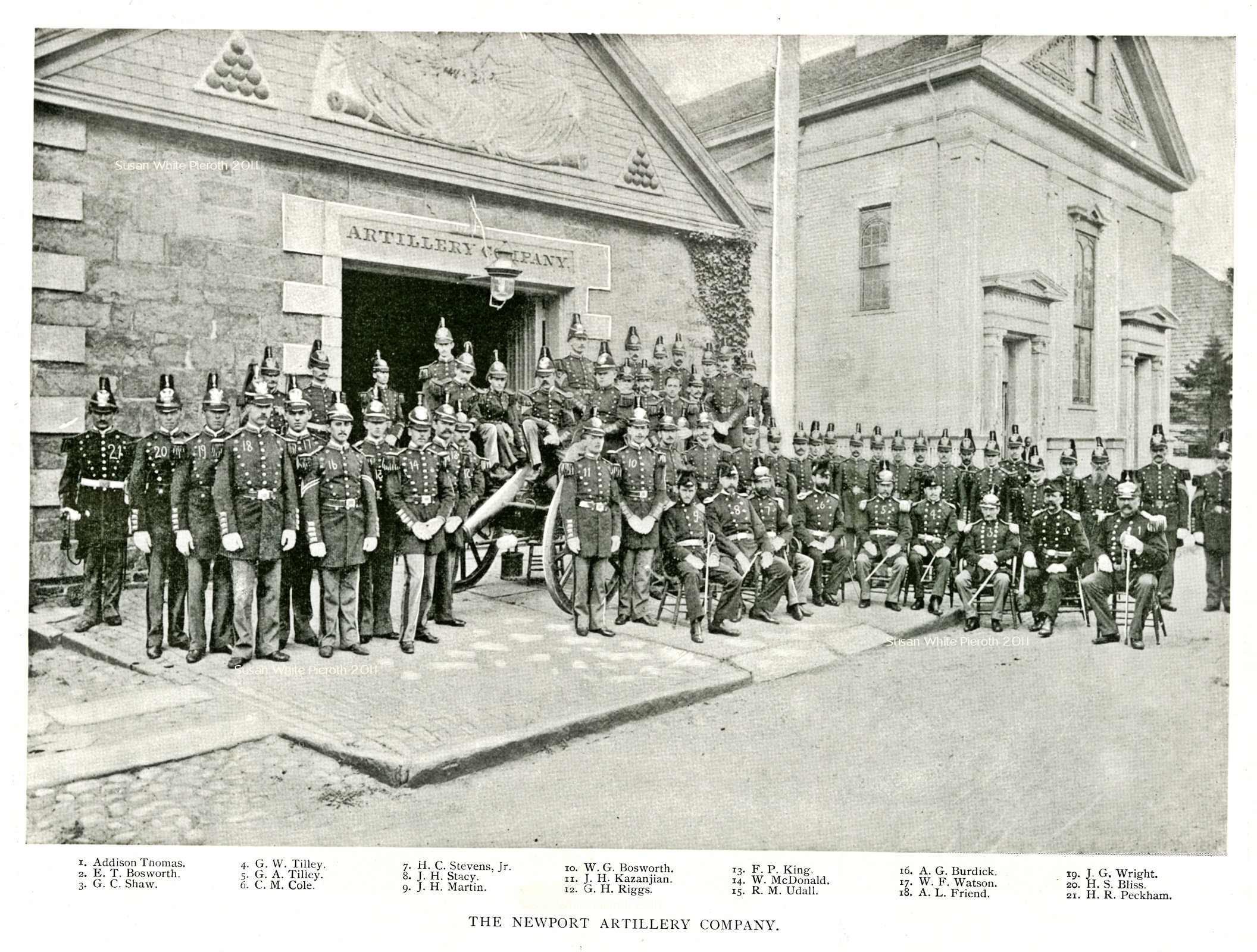
The Newport Artillery Company in 1891 in front of the Armory before the fire and addition of a second story

The company's stone and brick armory building, located at 23 Clarke Street in Newport, was constructed in 1835 in the Greek Revival style. The work was overseen by master stonemason Alexander McGregor who came to the United States from Scotland in 1825 to construct Fort Adams in Newport. About 1875 the armory was extended about 50 feet west. It was heavily damaged by a fire in 1906. When the armory was rebuilt later that same year, the second story was added.

The armory houses a museum which features an extensive collection of military uniforms from over 50 different nations. The museum also features the uniforms of prominent individuals such as Medal of Honor recipient General David M. Shoup, General Colin Powell, General Creighton Abrams, General William Westmoreland, Fleet Admiral Chester W. Nimitz, Admiral Cameron Winslow, Colonel Katherine Amelia Towle, President Anwar Sadat of Egypt, Admiral of the Fleet Earl Mountbatten of Burma, Field Marshal Viscount Montgomery of Alamein, HM King Hussein of Jordan, HRH Prince Philip, Duke of Edinburgh and HRH Prince Henry, Duke of Gloucester.

The museum also contains several artillery pieces including four bronze cannons cast for the state of Rhode Island by Paul Revere in 1798 and a portrait of President George Washington by Jane Stuart (daughter of Gilbert Stuart). A letter from President Washington to the Newport Artillery Company is currently on display at the Museum of Newport History.

The Newport Artillery's armory was listed on the National Register of Historic Places in 1972.

== Notable members ==
- Henry L. P. Beckwith, Jr. - Historian and genealogist.
- Metcalf Bowler - Colonial era merchant, political figure and jurist.
- Henry Y. Cranston - United States representative.
- Robert B. Cranston - United States representative.
- Christopher G. Champlin - United States representative and senator.
- W. Milton Farrow - Champion rifle marksman of the late 19th Century.
- William Hunter (Senator) - United States senator.
- Josias Lyndon - Colonial governor of Rhode Island.
- Francis Malbone - United States Senator.
- Henry Marchant - Colonial governor and delegate to the Continental Congress.
- Claiborne Pell - United States Senator.
- Charles L.F. Robinson - President of Colt Firearms from 1911 to 1916.
- Brevet Brigadier General George W. Tew - Union officer during the American Civil War.
- Henry E. Turner - Physician, President of the Newport Historical Society and member of the Society of the Cincinnati.
- William Vernon - Wealthy merchant and President of the Eastern Naval Board during the American Revolution.
- Samuel Ward - Colonial governor and delegate to the Continental Congress.
- George Peabody Wetmore - Governor of Rhode Island and United States Senator.

== Other Rhode Island historic military commands ==
- Kentish Guards
- Kentish Artillery
- Bristol Train of Artillery
- Pawtuxet Rangers
- Warren Federal Blues
- Gloucester Light Infantry
- United Train of Artillery
- Battery B, 1st Rhode Island Light Artillery
- Battery C, 1st Rhode Island Light Artillery

== See also ==
- Rhode Island Independent Military Organizations
- Armory of the Kentish Guards
- National Register of Historic Places listings in Newport County, Rhode Island
- Rhode Island Naval Militia
