= Rhode Island Independent Military Organizations =

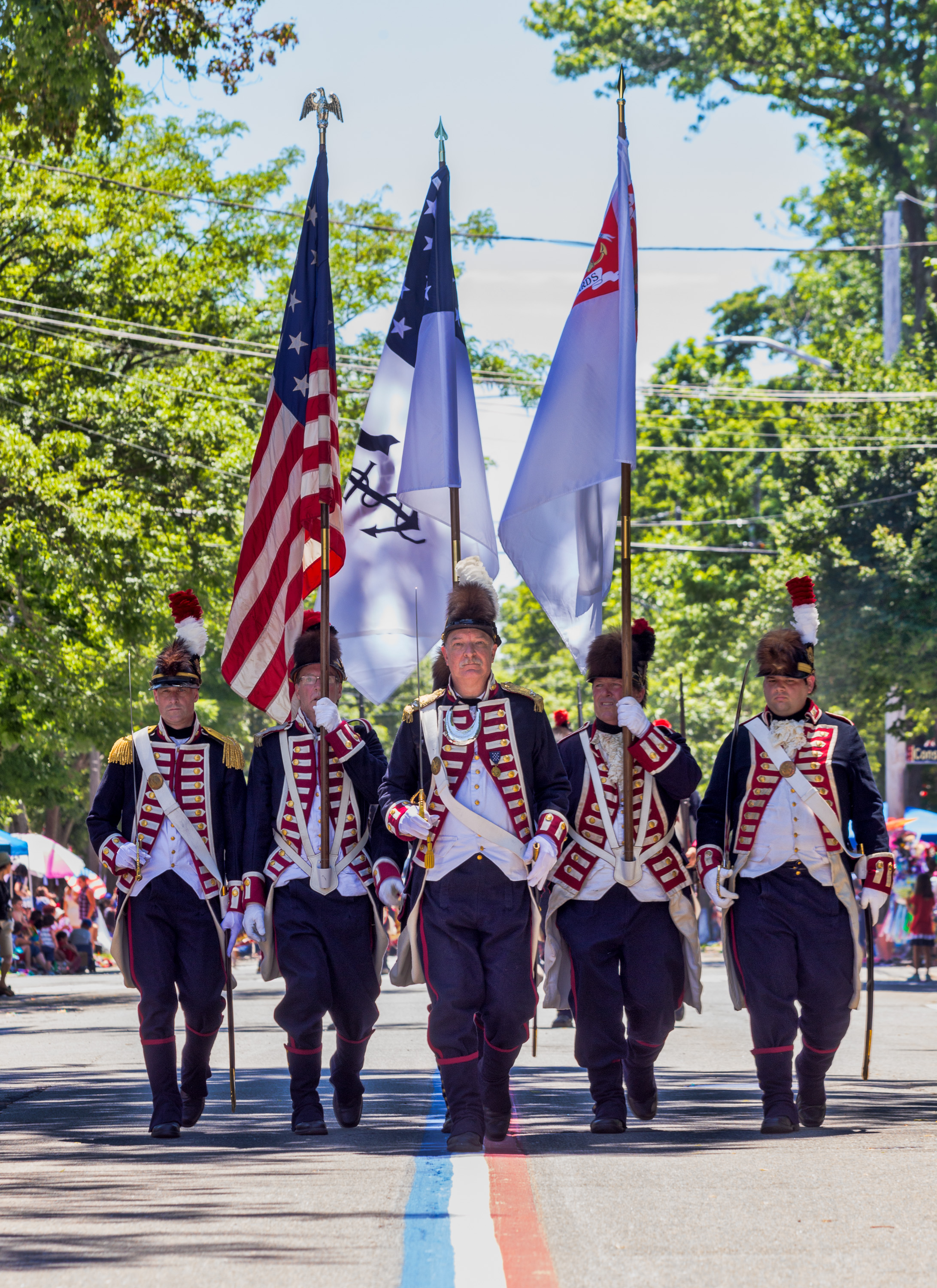
- Kentish Guards at the 2017 Bristol Fourth of July Parade
- Active: 1741–Present
- Country: United States
- Allegiance: Rhode Island
- Type: State defense force
- Role: Militia; Honor guard Historical reenactment

Commanders
- Civilian Leadership: Governor of Rhode Island
- State Military Leadership: Adjutant General of the State of Rhode Island

Rhode Island Independent Military Organizations

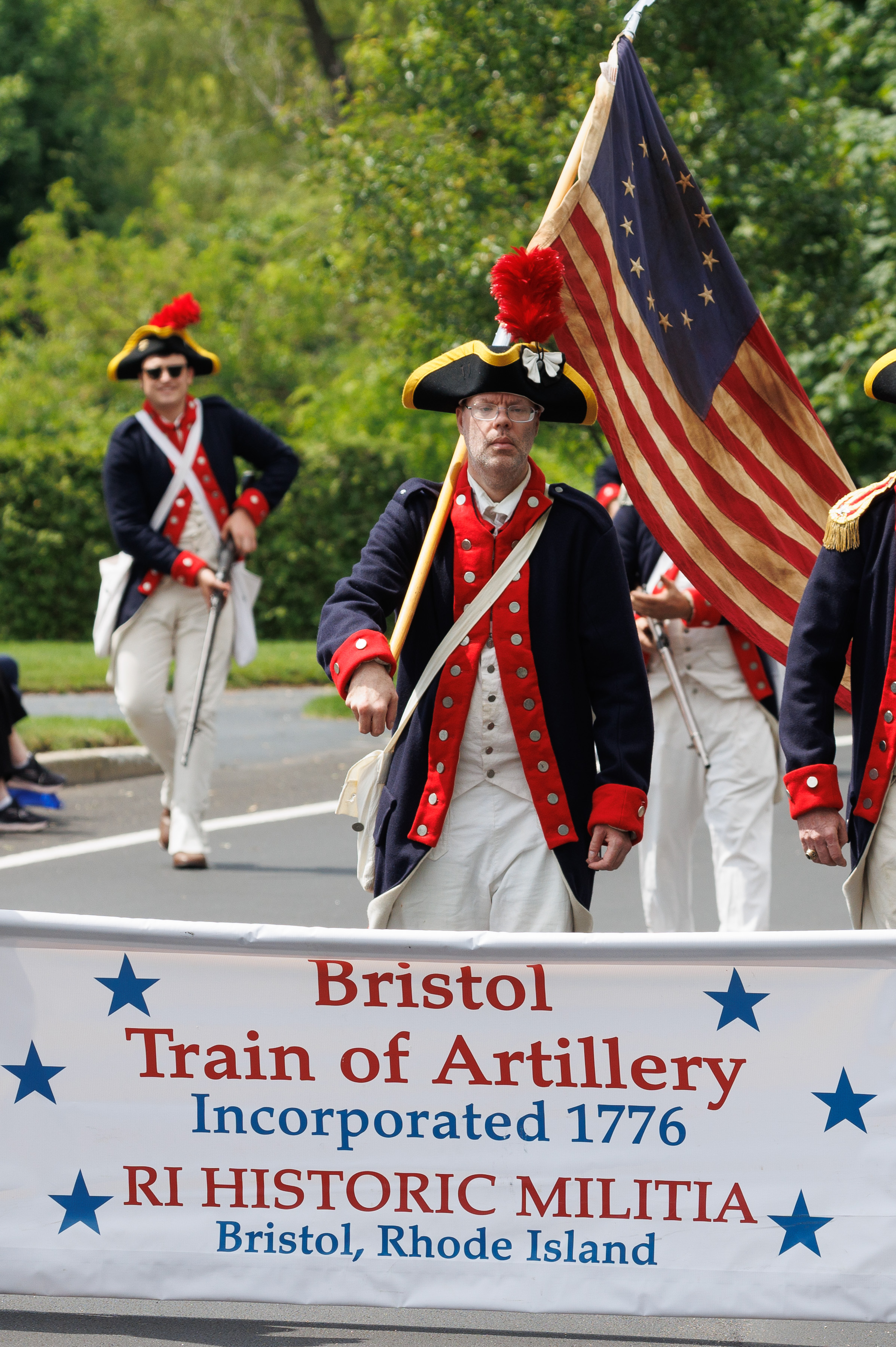
Bristol Train of Artillery

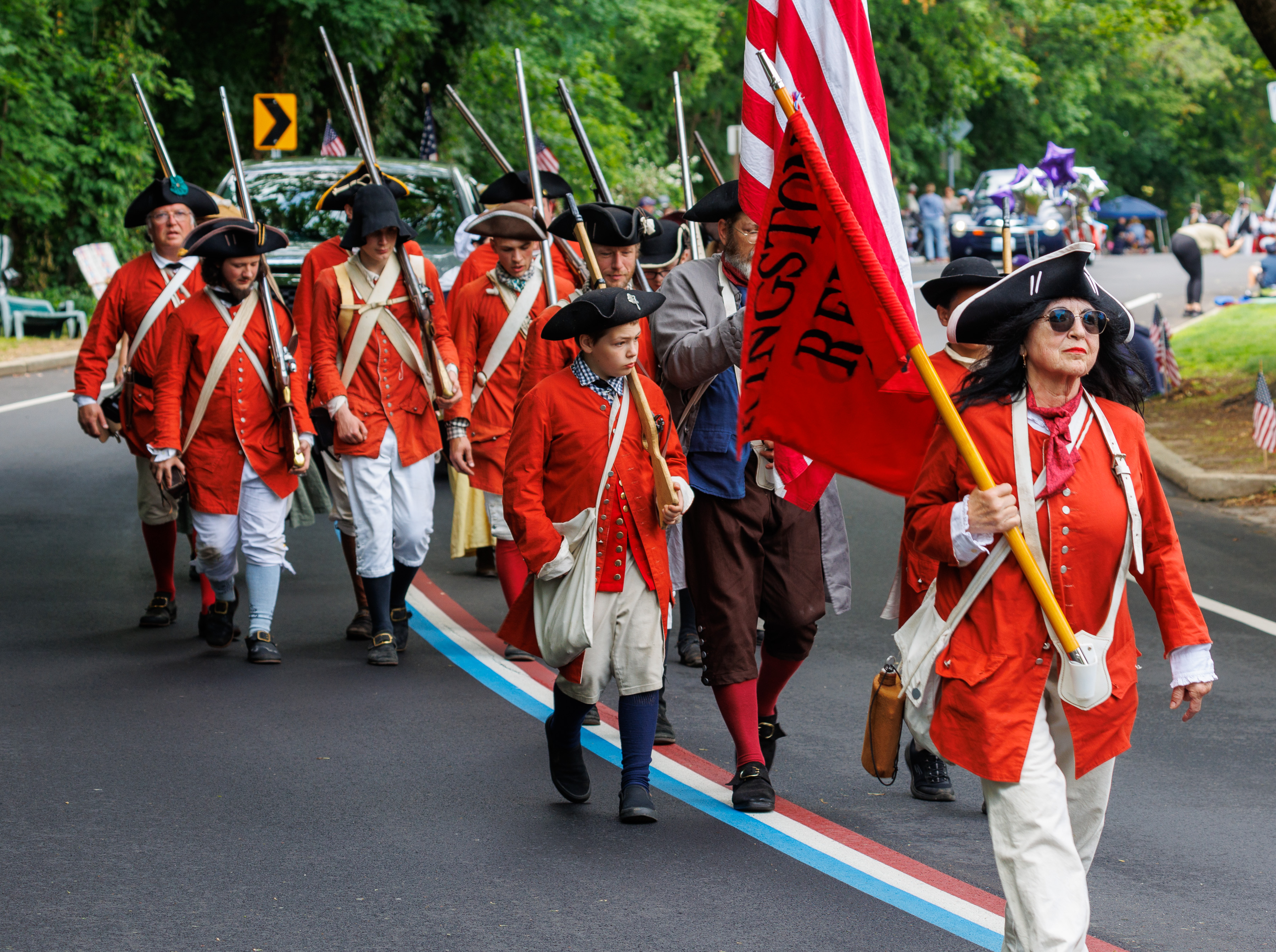
Kingston Reds at Gaspee Days parade

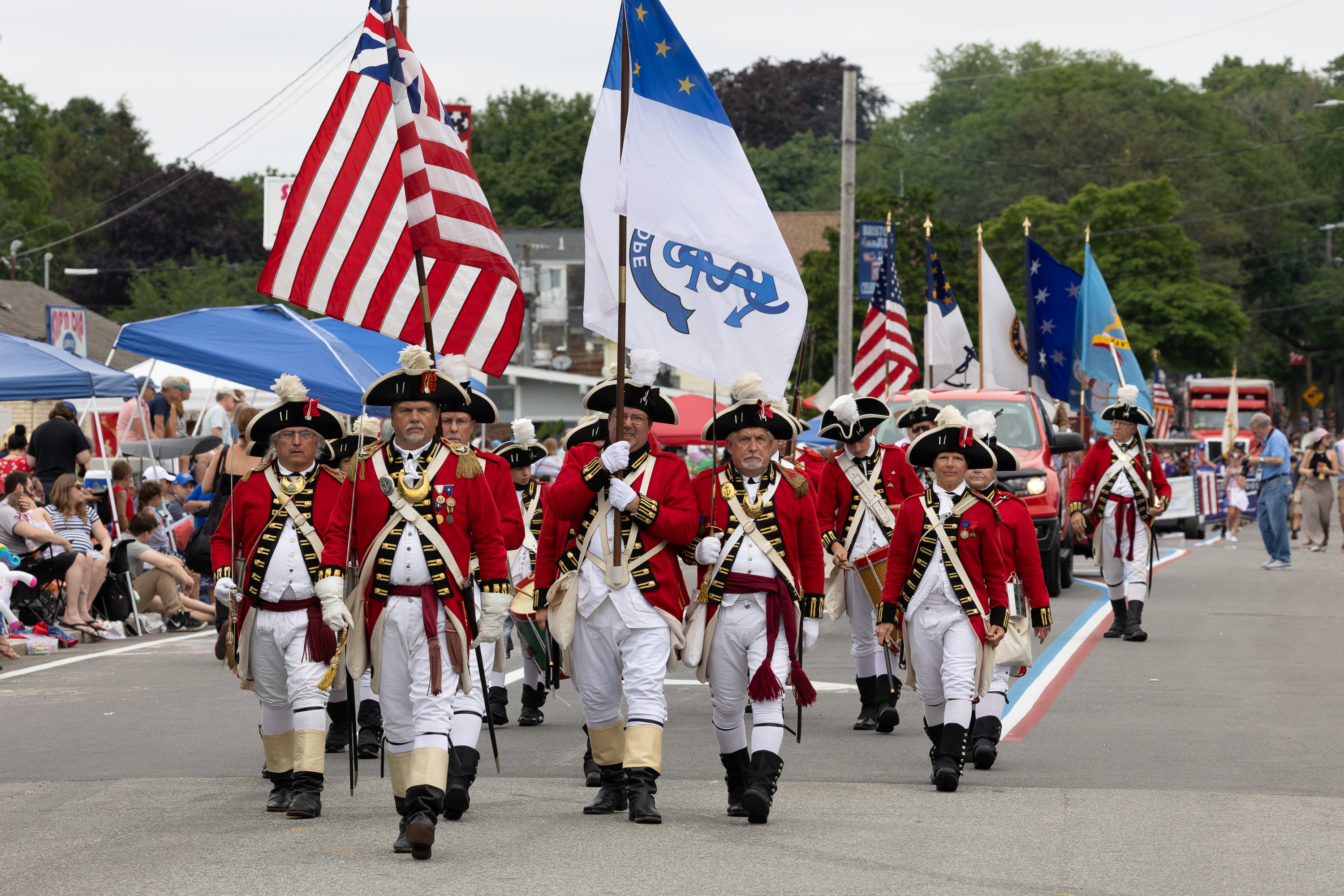
Pawtuxet Rangers at the 2021 Bristol Fourth of July Parade

The Rhode Island Independent Military Organizations (also known as the Chartered Commands of the Rhode Island Militia) are a group of independently operated chartered militias in the state of Rhode Island, most of whose histories date back to the state's colonial and revolutionary history. Under Rhode Island law, they are considered part of state's organized militia forces but are explicitly distinct from Rhode Island's National Guard, State Guard, and Naval Militia. Today, these organizations are largely ceremonial and educational in purpose but are sometime called up for active civil service in minor capacities.

== Historical Background ==
After the founding of Rhode Island in 1636, defense of the colony relied on "train bands" (later called militia companies) which were units made of male citizens of military age who were capable of bearing arms. Each town had its own train band, typically commanded by an officer with the rank of captain.

In 1675, with King Philips War raging, it was decided to have the militia of the colony commanded by an officer with the rank of major. The first person to hold this position was John Cranston who was currently deputy governor of the colony and would soon become governor. In 1683 the militia was divided into two regiments - one comprising the companies of the towns on the islands (i.e. Newport, Portsmouth, Jamestown and New Shoreham) and the other regiment comprising all the companies on the mainland of the colony. Initially, each regiment was commanded by a major, but this was changed to the rank of colonel in 1719. In 1731 the militia was reorganized on a county basis with there being one regiment for Providence and Kent Counties and one each for Newport and Kings (later Washington) County. As time went by, each county would have a number of regiments relative to its population and each county's militia force would be organized into a brigade commanded by a brigadier general with the commander of the entire state militia holding the rank of major general.

In 1741 the Artillery Company of the Town of Newport was chartered by an act of the Rhode Island General Assembly. The Company was patterned after the Ancient and Honorable Artillery Company of Massachusetts and was envisioned as a "nursery for officers" in its charter. A significant privilege given to the Company was the right to elect its own officers, whereas other militia officers were appointed by the governor. The next independent unit to be chartered was the Artillery Company of Westerly and Charlestown in 1755.

As the American Revolution approached, citizens of several other towns in the state petitioned the General Assembly to grant charters to form independent militia companies, with 12 being chartered in 1774 alone. During the Revolution, and for some time thereafter, additional charters were granted by the General Assembly. By the mid-1800s most of the chartered companies were inactive but a few (particularly the Newport Artillery, Kentish Guards and Bristol Train of Artillery) managed to remain active and retain their distinctive and independent status as chartered military commands in the Rhode Island Militia into the 20th Century.

During the early 1970s, in anticipation of the Bicentennial in 1976, several other historic commands were re-activated to participate in Revolutionary War themed events. This also parallelled the rise of the re-enacting hobby in that decade. Notably, the Newport Artillery Company served as an honor guard for Queen Elizabeth II's visit to Newport in June 1976. During this era, the Rhode Island Historic Military Commands became fixtures at notable events such as gubernatorial inaugurations, the Bristol 4th of July Parade and the Gaspee Days Parade in Pawtuxet.

Two current units of the Rhode Island Army National Guard are descendants of earlier independent military commands. They are the 169th Military Police Company and Company A, 2nd Battalion, 19th Special Forces Group. They are descendants, respectively, of the Artillery Company of Westerly and Charlestown (chartered in 1755) and the North Providence Rangers (chartered in 1774).

Rhode Island Historic Military Commands differ from reenacting units in that they are chartered by the State of Rhode Island and their officers are commissioned in the Rhode Island Militia by the governor.

== List of independent chartered military organizations ==
=== Active units ===
- Artillery Company of Newport (1741) (The oldest military organization in the United States operating under its original charter.)
- Kentish Guards (1774)
- Gloucester Light Infantry (1774)
- United Train of Artillery (1774)
- Pawtuxet Rangers (1774)
- Kingston Reds (1775-1808, rechartered 2019)
- Bristol Train of Artillery (1776)
- Warren Federal Blues (1798)
- Providence Marine Corps of Artillery (1801) (The PMCA serves as the veteran association of the 103rd Field Artillery Regiment.)
- Varnum Continentals (1907)
- Rhode Island Naval Militia Battalion
- Battery B, 1st Rhode Island Light Artillery (1861-1865, reactivated in 1986)

Note - Many of the currently active Rhode Island independent military organizations are member units of the Centennial Legion of Historic Military Commands.

=== Defunct units ===
- Artillery Company in Providence (1774)
- Artillery Company of Westerly and Charlestown (1755-1812) (Renamed Washington Guards.)
- Battery C, 1st Rhode Island Light Artillery (1861-1864, reactivated c. 1995, defunct c. 2020)
- Bristol Grenadiers (1799-1813)
- Bristol Ready Volunteers (1795-1799)
- Burrillville and Glocester Washington United Cavalry (1819)
- Cadet Company of the County of Providence (1774)
- Captain General's Cavaliers (1783)
- Charlestown Independent Company (1789)
- Civil Guards in Providence (1813)
- Coventry Rangers (1789)
- Cranston Blues (1791)
- Cumberland and Smithfield Light Dragoons (1810)
- Cumberland Light Infantry (1792)
- Cumberland United Company of Volunteers (1821)
- Fayette Rifle Corps (1731)
- Federal Blues of Bristol (1799-1815)
- First Light Infantry Company of the 15th Regiment (1840-1842)
- First Light Infantry of Providence (1818-c.1930)
- Foster Artillery (1829)
- Foster Safeguards (1799-1829)
- Glocester and Burrillville Safe Guards (1823)
- Glocester Grenadiers (1792-1795)
- Governor's Independent Company of Light Infantry (1791-1792)
- Governor's Independent Company of Volunteers (1792-1799) (Renamed from Governor's Independent Company of Light Infantry.)
- Greene Artillery (1819)
- Hopkinton Rangers (1800-1822)
- Independent Company of Cadets in the Town of Providence (1775-1841)
- Independent Company of the Sons of Liberty (1817)
- Independent Rifle Company of Cumberland (1814)
- Independent Smithfield Rifle Company (1814)
- Johnston Guards (1842)
- Johnston Rangers (1792-1810)
- Kentish Artillery (1805)
- Kentish Light Infantry (1798-1805)
- Kentish Troop of Horse (1792-1835)
- Kingstown Rangers (1788-1812)
- Light Company of the 1st Regiment (1794)
- Light Infantry in the County of Providence (1774)
- Little Compton Artillery (1800-1802)
- Manville Light Infantry (1842)
- Mechanics Rifles (as of 1861)
- Morgan Riflemen (1814)
- Narragansett Guards (1843)
- National Cadets of Providence (1840)
- Newport Guards (1793)
- Newport Independent Volunteers (1805)
- Newport Light Infantry (1774)
- Newtown Rangers (1776)
- North Kingstown Guards (1813)
- North Kingstown Rangers (1788)
- North Providence Rangers (1774) (Ancestor unit of Company A, 2nd Battalion, 19th Special Forces Group, RIARNG.)
- Pawtucket Light Guard (as of 1861)
- Pawtuxet Artillery (1812) (Name changed from Pawtuxet Rangers.)
- Pawtuxet Rangers (1774-1812) (Name changed to Pawtuxet Artillery.)
- Portsmouth Light Infantry (1808)
- Providence Artillery (1761-1775) (United with the Providence Fusiliers in 1775 to form the United Company of the Train of Artillery.)
- Providence Fusiliers (1774-1775) (United with the Providence Artillery in 1775 to form the United Company of the Train of Artillery.)
- Providence Grenadier Company (1774)
- Providence Horse Guards (1842-1879) (Reorganized as Troop B of the Rhode Island Cavalry Squadron.)
- Providence Independent Company of Cadets (1775)
- Providence Independent Light Dragoons (1792)
- Providence Light Infantry (1792-1799) (Renamed from Governor's Independent Company of Light Infantry.)
- Providence Troop of Light Dragoons (1792)
- Rhode Island Guard of Warwick
- Rhode Island Guards (1843)
- Rhode Island Guards No. 3 of Coventry
- Rhode Island Horse Guards (1843)
- Rifle Rangers of South Kingstown (1844) (Name changed from Washington Grenadiers.)
- Scituate and Foster Independent Company of Riflemen (1816)
- Scituate Guards (1821-1828)
- Scituate Hunters (1774)
- Scituate Light Infantry (1791)
- Sea Fencibles of Providence (1843)
- Second Light Infantry Company (1824)
- Smithfield and Cumberland Rangers (1776)
- Smithfield Federal Protectors (1791-1793)
- Smithfield Grenadiers (1791-1830)
- Smithfield Light Infantry (1814)
- South Kingstown Artillery Company (1776)
- Tiverton and Little Compton Light Dragoons (1794)
- United Artillery Company of Kent County (1798-1799) (Name changed to United Artillery of Warwick in 1799.)
- United Artillery of Warwick (1799-1803)
- United Independent Volunteers (1799-1842) (Merger of Providence Light Infantry and Governor's Independent Company of Volunteers.)
- United Volunteers (1825)
- Wakefield Cadets (1843) (Name changed to Narragansett Guards.)
- Warren Artillery Company (1841)
- Warren Light Infantry (1811-1833)
- Warwick and Coventry Guards (1814)
- Washington Cadets (1842-1843) (Name changed to Narragansett Guards.)
- Washington Cavalry (1792-1841)
- Washington Grenadiers (1821-1844)
- Washington Guards (1812-1855) (Renamed from Artillery Company of Westerly and Charlestown.)
- Washington Independent Company (1788-1829)
- Washington Rifle Corps (1833)
- Washington Troop of Horse (1793)
- West Greenwich and Coventry Light Infantry (1796-1812)
- West Greenwich Patriots (1823)
- Westerly Rifles (1855) (Renamed from Washington Guards.)
- Wickford Pioneers (1842)
- Woonsocket Guards (1842)

Note - Over the course of time, some of the independent military organizations changed their names. The above listing may include different names used by the same unit during its history.

== See also ==
- Rhode Island National Guard
- Rhode Island State Guard
- List of United States militia units in the American Revolutionary War
