= Bristol Train of Artillery Museum =

Museum in Bristol, Rhode Island, US

Coordinates: 41.671490°N 71.273205°W

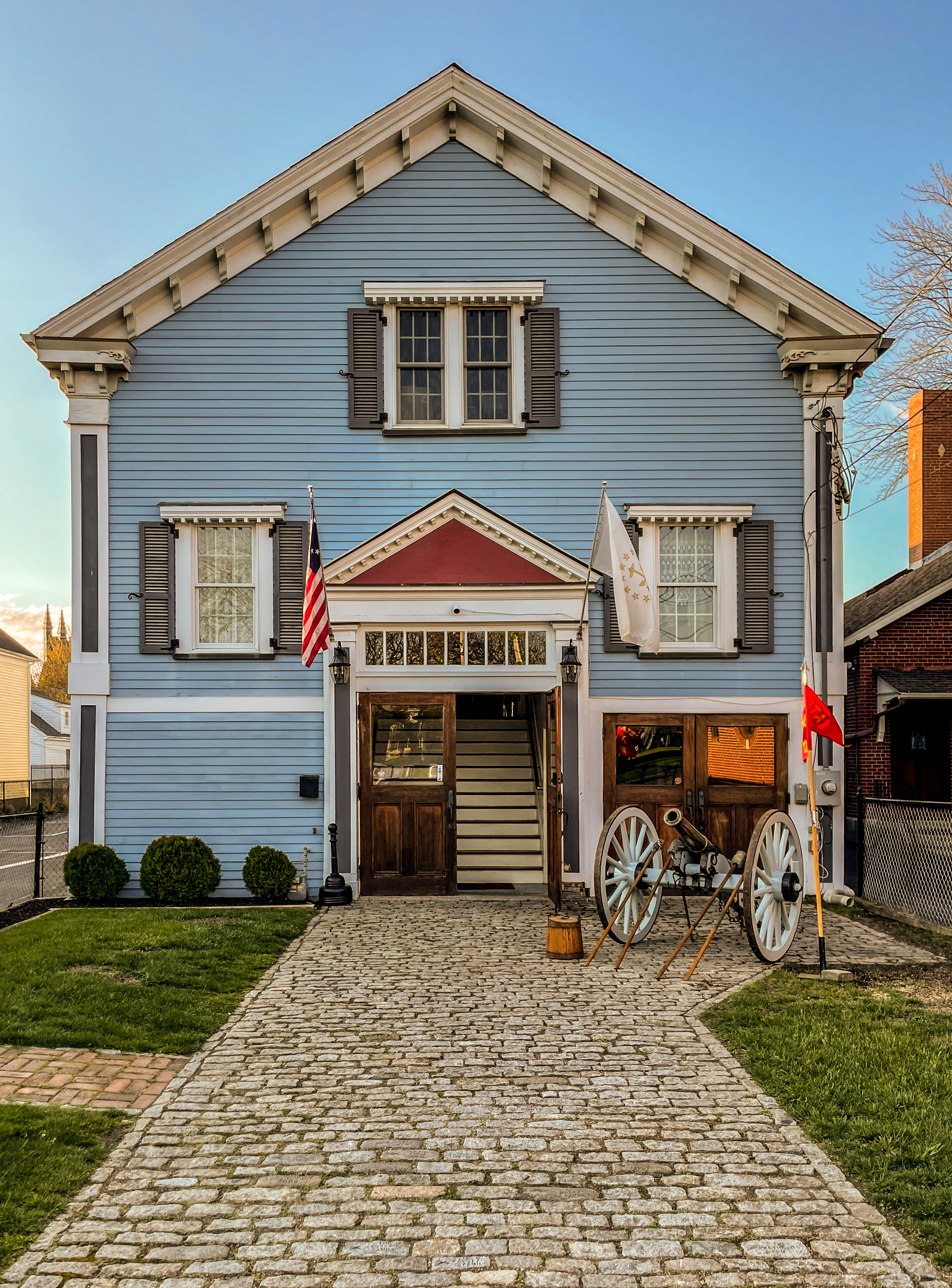
Bristol Train of Artillery Museum

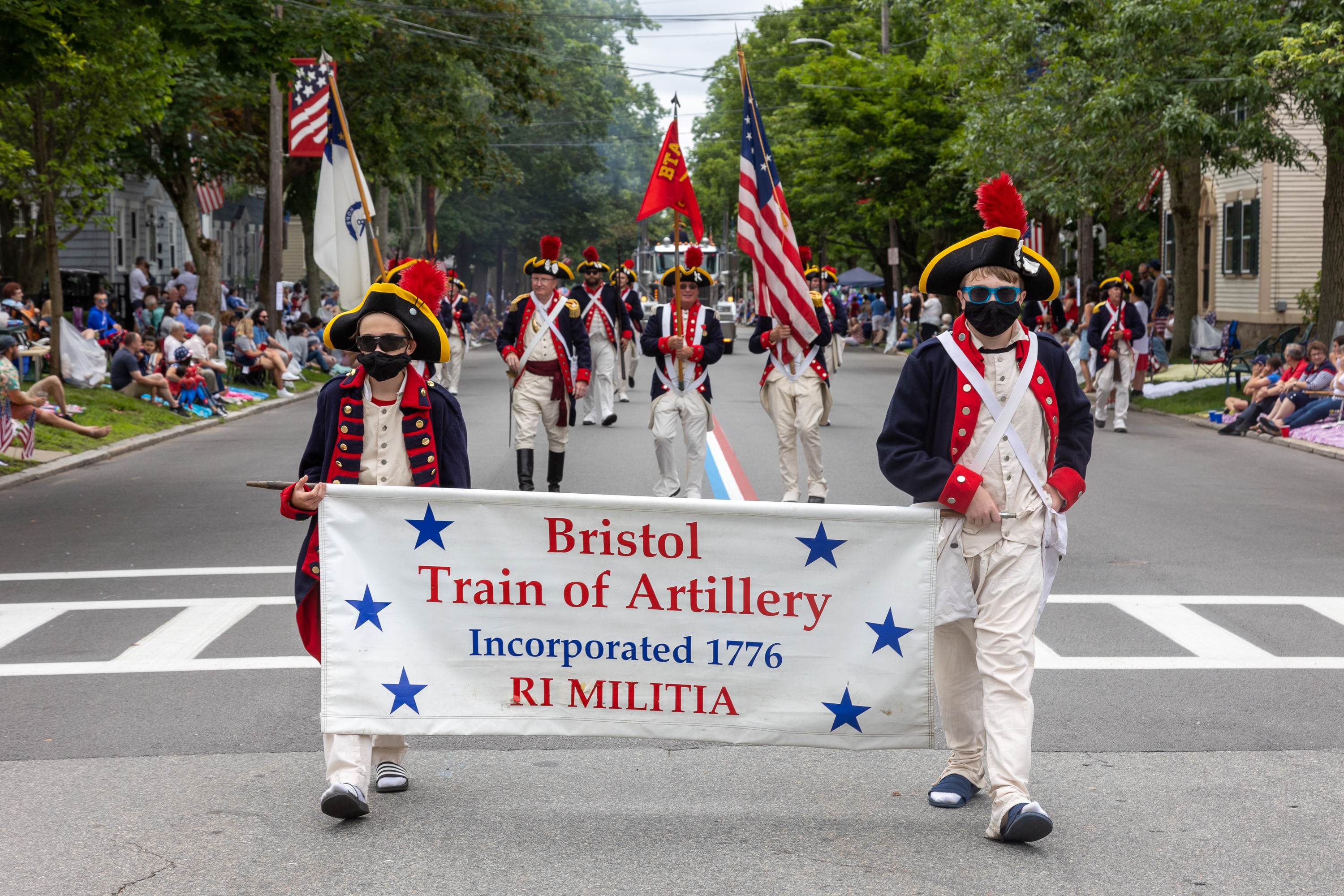
Bristol Train of Artillery at the 2021 Bristol Fourth of July Parade

Bristol Train of Artillery Museum is an armory museum in Bristol, Rhode Island, which is the meeting place of the Bristol Train of Artillery, a militia artillery unit of the Rhode Island Island State Militia and a member of the Rhode Island Independent Military Organizations. The Bristol Train of Artillery was chartered on February 12, 1776 and has been in uninterrupted existence since then. The current building, which houses the museum collection, dates to 1843. The Museum "collection includes photographs, scrapbooks, drawings, paintings of events. Some records from the American Civil War, but much has been lost. Some exhibits of guns, uniforms, flags, hats, helmets, swords and other militaria."

The museum is open by appointment only.
