= Rhode Island Wing Civil Air Patrol =

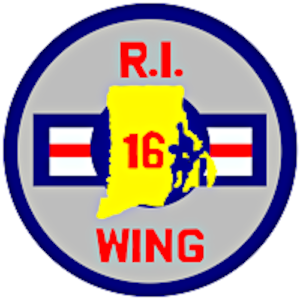
- Rhode Island Wing of Civil Air Patrol

Associated branches
- United States Air Force

Command staff
- Commander: Col Warren M. Weiss
- Deputy Commander: Lt Col Eileen Rapose
- Chief of Staff: Vacant

Current statistics
- Cadets: 55
- Seniors: 69
- Total Membership: 124
- Website: riwg.cap.gov
- Statistics as of 2026

The Rhode Island Wing of the Civil Air Patrol (CAP) is the highest echelon of Civil Air Patrol in the state of Rhode Island. Rhode Island Wing headquarters are located in Cranston, Rhode Island. The Rhode Island Wing consists of over 170 cadet and adult members operating from 6 locations across the state of Rhode Island.

== Mission ==
The Civil Air Patrol has three primary missions: aerospace education, cadet programs, and emergency services.

=== Emergency services ===
The Civil Air Patrol is responsible for providing emergency services including air and ground search and rescue, disaster relief, counter-drug operations, and homeland security missions. CAP aircraft fly non-combat homeland security missions, including observing critical infrastructure, providing an airborne communications relay, and the airlifting of important cargo. CAP units provide impact assessment, light transport, communications support and low-level route surveys for the Air Force

=== Cadet programs ===
The Civil Air Patrol offers a cadet program for youth aged 12 to 21, which includes aerospace education, leadership training, physical fitness and moral leadership. Cadets meet on average 2 hours per week and one Saturday per month,(if gets approved by the Wing there will be a Saturday event), and also have opportunities to attend leadership encampments, career academies, and other activities during the summer.

=== Aerospace education ===
The Civil Air Patrol offers aerospace education for CAP members and the general public, including providing training to the members of CAP through the cadet program, and offering workshops for youth throughout the nation through schools and public aviation events. Each year, the Civil Air Patrol supports approximately 200 aerospace education workshops for teachers at approximately 100 colleges and universities around the country, preparing an estimated 5,000 teachers to teach aerospace-related subjects in their classrooms.

== Organization ==
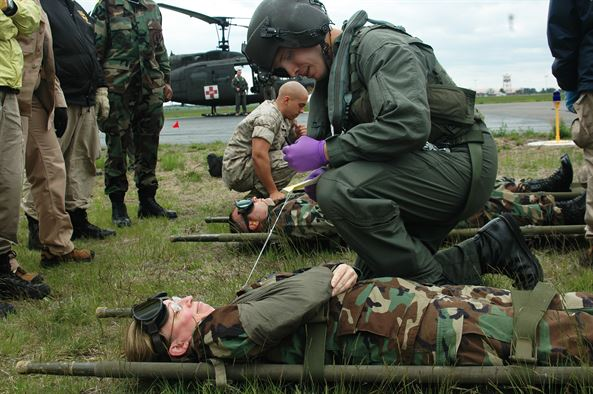
A Rhode Island Army National Guard Huey aircraft member (foreground) and a Marine ambulance driver prepare Civil Air Patrol volunteers for a simulated airlift from the scene of a mock disaster.

Squadrons of the Rhode Island Wing
Designation	Squadron Name	Location	Notes
NER-RI-001	Rhode Island Wing Headquarters	Cranston	
NER-RI-002	Vanguard Composite Squadron	Middletown	Deactivated
NER-RI-003	102nd Composite Squadron	North Smithfield	Previously NER-RI-033
NER-RI-004	Providence Composite Squadron	Providence	Deactivated
NER-RI-005	Newport Composite Squadron	Newport	Deactivated
NER-RI-006	Westerly Composite Squadron	Westerly	Deactivated
NER-RI-012	Pawtucket Composite Squadron	Pawtucket	
NER-RI-034	West Bay Composite Squadron	Cranston	
NER-RI-035	Newport County Composite Squadron	Newport	Deactivated
NER-RI-036	South County Composite Squadron	North Kingstown	Deactivated
NER-RI-037	106th Cadet Squadron	Warren	
NER-RI-999	Rhode Island Legislative Squadron	Providence	

== See also ==
- Awards and decorations of the Civil Air Patrol
- Rhode Island Air National Guard
- Rhode Island Army National Guard
- Rhode Island State Guard
- United States Coast Guard Auxiliary
