= Pawtuxet Rangers =

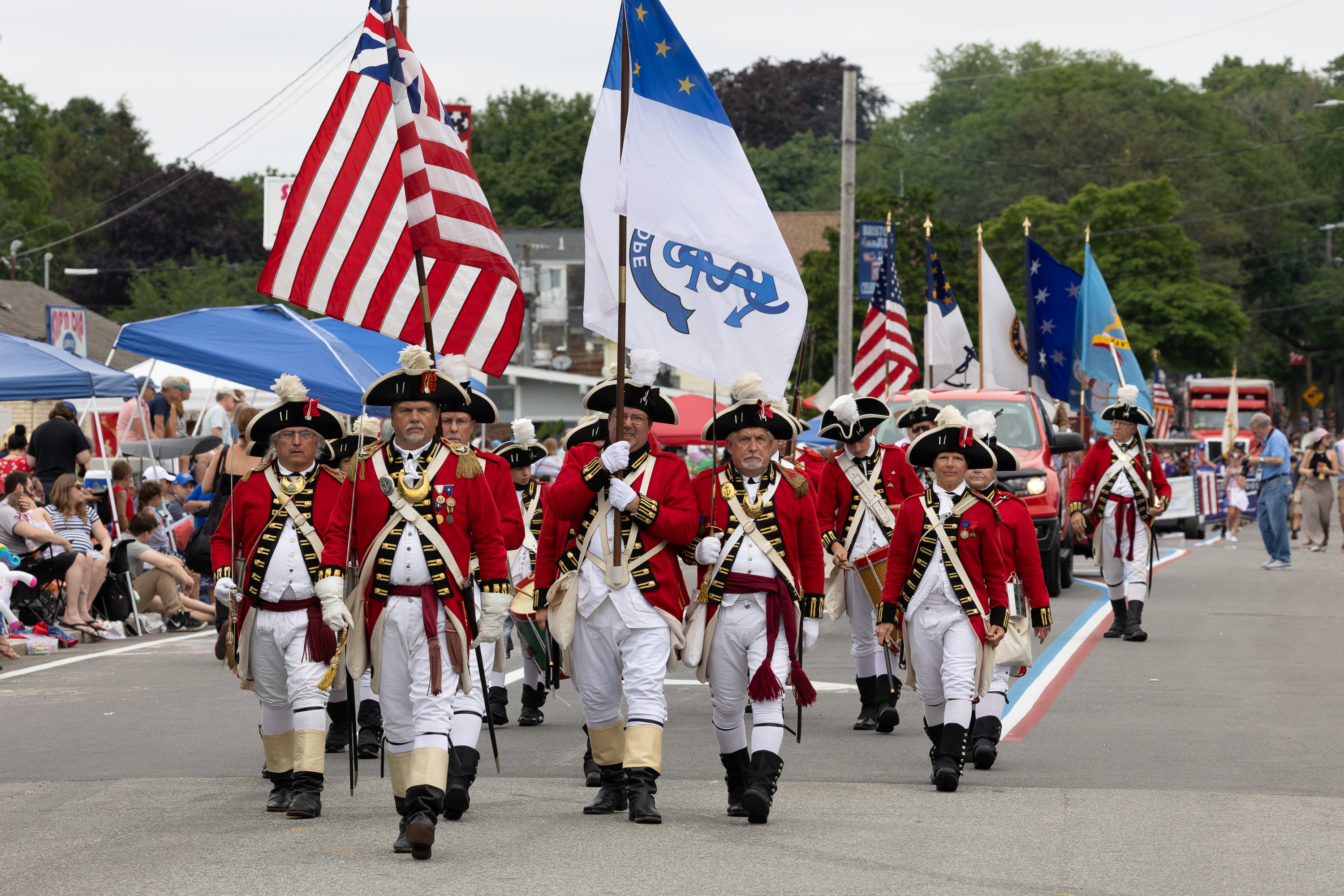
Pawtuxet Rangers at the 2021 Bristol Fourth of July Parade.

The Pawtuxet Rangers is an active independent military organization of the Rhode Island militia that was founded in 1774 and currently serves primarily as a ceremonial honor guard and as historic educators. The Pawtuxet Rangers operates an armory museum in historic Pawtuxet village in Warwick, Rhode Island.

The Pawtuxet Ranger were chartered in 1774 to "protect the village of Pawtuxet (Cranston/Warwick line) in Rhode Island. The primary mission of the company today is to perpetuate history by participating in school programs, parades, battle reenactments, encampments, ceremonial programs and more."

The historic Infantry group participated several wars and armed conflicts including the War of 1812 and the Dorr Rebellion of 1842.The original organization sold its armory and became inactive The Rangers' charter was reactivated in 1972 when the Gaspee Days events were initiated to help in the celebrations. The Rangers purchased back their original Armory in 1985 and then restored it. The Pawtuxet Rangers still remain part of the Rhode Island militia but serves a largely ceremonial role and educational role using period muskets and cannon for special events.
