= USS Kanawha (1896) =

History

United States
- Name: USS Kanawha
- Namesake: The Kanawha River in West Virginia
- Builder: Charles L. Seabury and Company, Nyack on Hudson, New York
- Completed: 1896
- Acquired: 7 June 1898
- Commissioned: 26 July 1898
- Decommissioned: 8 October 1898
- Fate: Loaned to Rhode Island Naval Militia 12 December 1898; returned to U.S. Navy 12 August 1899 and transferred to the U.S. Department of War

General characteristics
- Type: Screw steamer
- Tonnage: 175
- Length: 114 ft (35 m)
- Beam: 18 ft (5.5 m)
- Draft: 7 ft (2.1 m) mean
- Speed: 14 knots
- Armament: 1 × 3-pounder gun; 3 × 1-pounder guns; 2 × machine guns

The second USS Kanawha was a screw-powered steamer that served in the United States Navy in 1898 during the Spanish–American War.

Kanawha was built in 1896 by Charles L. Seabury and Company, Nyack on Hudson, New York. The U.S. Navy purchased her from John P. Duncan on 7 June 1898 for use in the Spanish–American War and armed her. She commissioned as USS Kanawha at the New York Navy Yard, New York, New York, on 26 July 1898, Lieutenant Frank F. Fletcher in command.

Kanawha steamed out of New York Harbor on 5 August 1898 and called at Port Royal, South Carolina, and Key West, Florida, before arriving at Gibara, Cuba, on 21 August 1898. She operated in Cuban waters supporting occupation forces until departing Gibara on 12 September 1898. After calling at Port Royal and Charleston, South Carolina, and at Hampton Roads, Virginia, she returned to New York on 29 September 1898.

Kanawha decommissioned on 8 October 1898 and was loaned to the Rhode Island Naval Militia on 12 December 1898. She was returned to the U.S. Navy on 12 August 1899 and transferred to the U.S. Department of War.
