= Warren Federal Blues =

The Warren Federal Blues is an active independent military organization of the Rhode Island militia that was founded in 1798 and currently serves primarily as a ceremonial honor guard and as historic educational organization in Warren, Rhode Island. The Warren Federal Blues operate a historic armory museum at 11 Jefferson Street in Warren, which was built in 1842.

The Warren Federal Blues were chartered in 1798 and members originally served as marines to police navy seamen on the USS General Greene (1799), which was commanded by Christopher Raymond Perry, the father of Oliver Hazard Perry, who also served aboard the ship. The Warren Federal Blues still remain part of the Rhode Island militia but serve a largely ceremonial and educational role using period muskets and cannon for special events.
