= USS Aileen =

Patrol vessel of the United States Navy

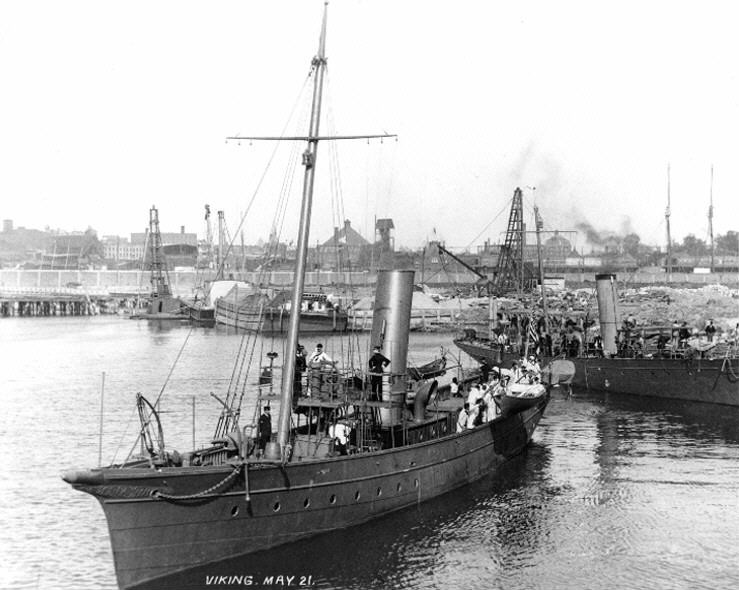
- USS Aileen moored at the New York Navy Yard, Brooklyn, New York, after being fitted for naval service, 21 May 1898. The ship getting underway is Viking, another yacht converted for use in the Spanish–American War.

History

United States
- Name: Aileen
- Builder: Delaware River Iron Ship Building and Engine Works, Chester, PA
- Launched: 1896
- Acquired: 28 April 1898
- Commissioned: 14 May 1898
- Decommissioned: 5 July 1919
- Stricken: 12 August 1919
- Fate: Sold 20 November 1920 to Tams, Lemoin and Crane of New York City. Fate unknown

General characteristics
- Type: armed yacht
- Displacement: 192 long tons (195 t)
- Length: 120 ft (37 m)
- Beam: 20 ft (6.1 m)
- Draft: 8 ft (2.4 m)
- Speed: 14 kn (26 km/h)
- Complement: 33
- Sensors & processing systems: 1 × 3-pounder (47 mm (1.85 in)) gun; 2 × 1-pounder (37 mm (1.46 in)) guns

USS Aileen was a steam yacht built in 1896 at the Delaware River Iron Ship Building and Engine Works shipyard in Chester, Pennsylvania, by John Roach & Sons. The United States Navy bought her on 28 April 1898; converted her for naval service at New York Navy Yard; and commissioned her there on 14 May 1898.

== Service history ==
Found unfit for cruising the open seas, Aileen served on coastal defense through the Spanish–American War. On 18 May 1899, the converted yacht was transferred to the New York Naval Militia on loan for use as a training ship. On 18 November 1909, the New York Naval Militia returned Aileen to the Navy. She was placed in service at the Portsmouth, New Hampshire Navy Yard on 30 April 1910; but, sometime later that year, the yacht was transferred to the Rhode Island Naval Militia and served the state of Rhode Island training naval militiamen until the US entered World War I on 6 April 1917. The following day, Aileen was reacquired by the Navy and placed in commission once again. For the duration of the war, she served in the 2nd Naval District, patrolling the New England coastline between New London, Connecticut and Block Island Sound. After February 1919, she operated from New London with the Reserve Squadron, anti-submarine Squadrons, engaged in training missions. She was decommissioned on 5 July 1919 and, 18 days later, was ordered sold. Her name was struck from the Navy list on 12 August. On 20 November 1920, she was sold to Tarns, Lemoin & Crane, of New York City.
