= Gloucester Light Infantry =

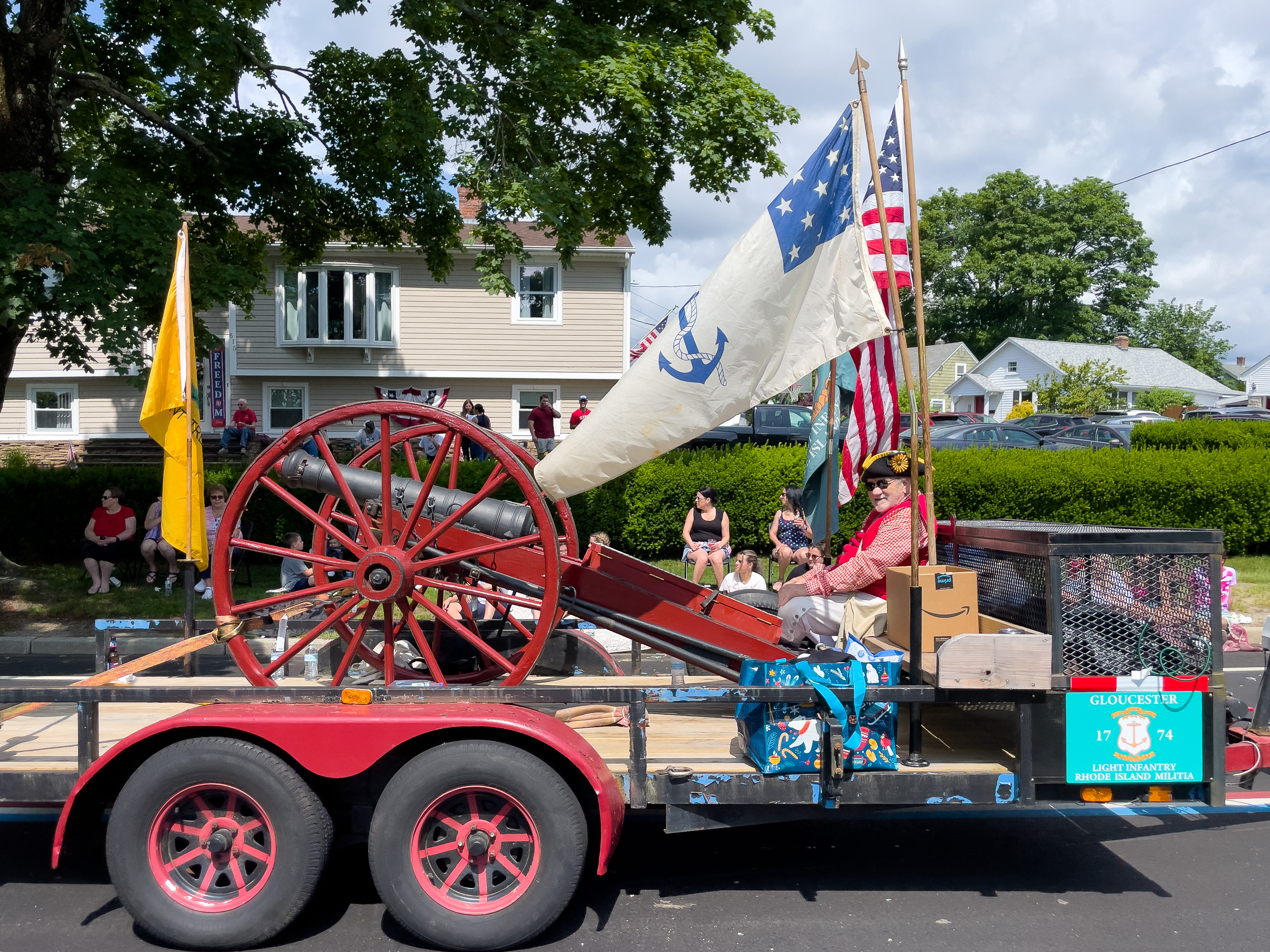
Gloucester Light Infantry's parade float in the Gaspee Days parade

Gloucester Light Infantry is an active independent military organization of the Rhode Island militia that was founded in 1774 and currently serves primarily as a ceremonial honor guard and educational group. The Gloucester Light Infantry operates an armory museum behind the town hall at 33 Dorr Drive in Chepachet, Rhode Island which was the former ell of the Chepachet Elementary School.

The Gloucester Light Infantry was first organized in Chepachet through an “Act of the Colonial Legislature” which was passed in October 1774 creating the “Company of Light Infantry of the Town of Gloucester.” During the Revolutionary War in December 1776 the Infantry was reorganized as the 5th Company of the 1st Regiment of the Brigade to defend Rhode Island during the War. Later in the War on May 6, 1780, the company was mustered out and reverted to being Gloucester Light Infantry. The history Infantry group participated in most American wars and armed conflicts including the War of 1812, The Dorr Rebellion of 1842, American Civil War (as Company 1, 2nd Rhode Island Volunteers), Spanish American War (1898), and World War I. In 1923 The Gloucester Light Infantry was reorganized as Battery F, 243rd Artillery.

The Gloucester Light Infantry still remains part of the Rhode Island militia but serves a largely ceremonial role using period muskets and cannon for special events and helping to educate the public.
