= Joseph Pope Balch =

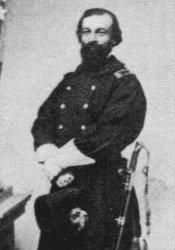
- 1861 photograph of Joseph Pope Balch
- Born: August 9, 1822; Providence, Rhode Island, U.S.
- Died: December 2, 1872 (aged 50); Providence, Rhode Island, U.S.
- Burial place: Swan Point Cemetery
- Military career
- Allegiance: United States of America; Union
- Branch: United States Army; Union Army; Rhode Island Militia
- Service years: 1861-1865
- Rank: Major; Brevet Brigadier General
- Commands: First Rhode Island Detached Militia; 2nd Brigade, Rhode Island Militia
- Conflicts: American Civil War; First Battle of Bull Run
- Other work: Merchant

Joseph Pope Balch (August 9, 1822 – December 2, 1872) was an American businessman from Rhode Island who served as an officer in the Union Army during the early months of the American Civil War.

== Early life and background ==
Balch was an educated man, but decided upon a career in business instead of attending college, first working in his father's drug store at the age of 14 as a clerk, and eventually becoming a partner.

In 1841 he joined a militia unit known as the Providence Marine Corps of Artillery, by 1857 Balch had risen to command of Rhode Island's Second Militia brigade.

== Civil war ==
At the outbreak of the war, he was appointed to the rank of major in the First Rhode Island Detached Militia, a "90-day" regiment on May 2, 1861. Balch succeeded to command of the regiment when its previous commander, Colonel Ambrose Burnside was promoted to brigadier general and given command of a brigade. Balch commanded the 1st Rhode Island at the First Battle of Bull Run on July 21, 1861.

Balch was mustered out of the volunteers along with the regiment on August 2, 1861. Balch returned to the Rhode Island Militia and commanded the Second Militia Brigade until the close of the war.

Balch was recognized for "coolness, steadiness, and courage under fire" when his appointment by brevet (an honorary promotion) to the grade of brevet brigadier general of volunteers, to rank from March 13, 1865, was confirmed by the United States Senate on July 25, 1868.

== Postwar career ==
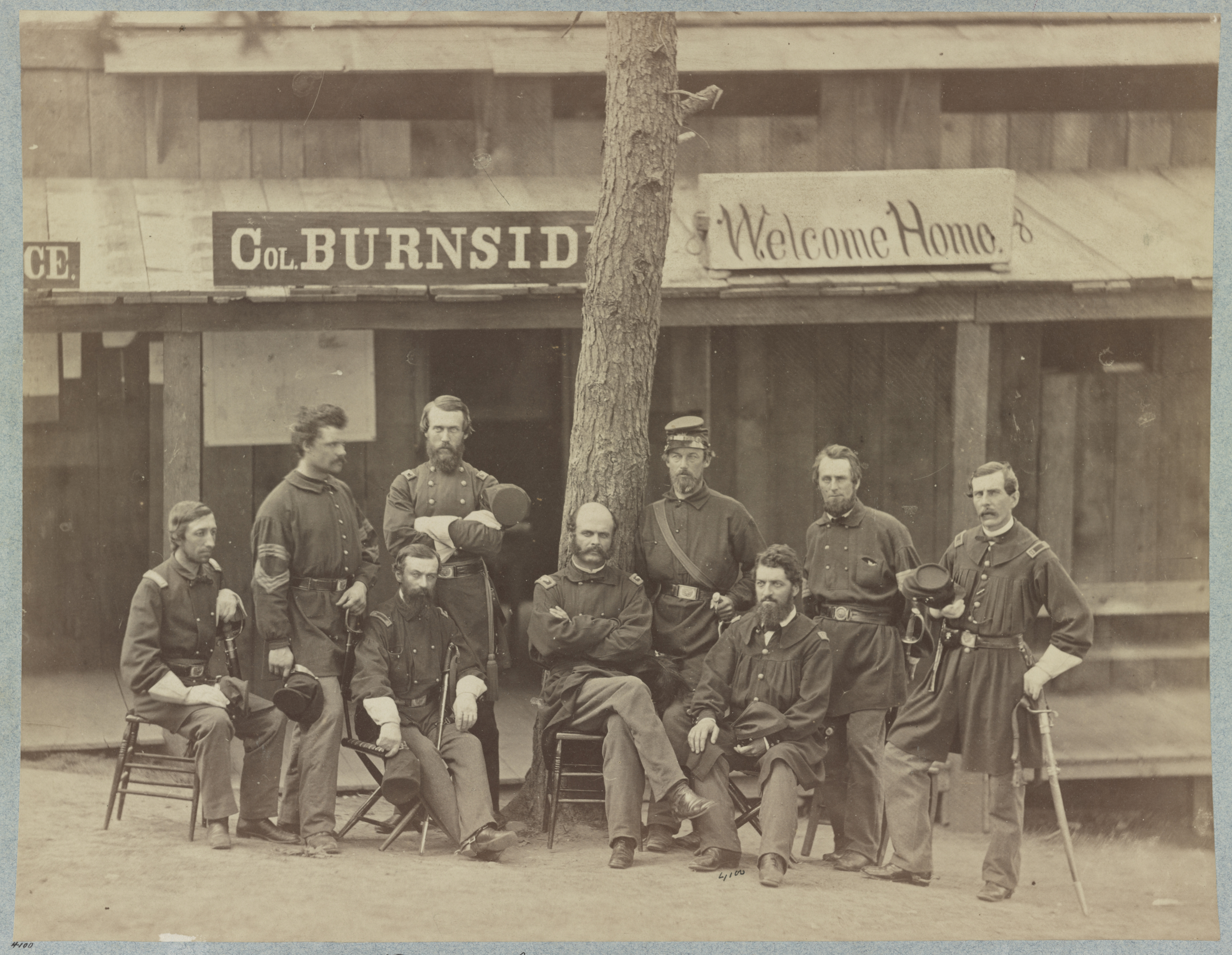
Balch (seated) and officers of the 1st Rhode Island at Camp Sprague, Rhode Island, 1861.

After the war, Balch was a prominent member of Rhode Island society, and had six daughters and a son. He held membership in civic organizations including the Rhode Island Society for the Encouragement of Domestic Industry, and the Providence Franklin society. He died suddenly in his home from an internal hemorrhage in 1872.

He is buried at Swan Point Cemetery in Providence.

== See also ==
- List of American Civil War brevet generals (Union)
