= The United Companies of the Train of Artillery of the Town of Providence =

Fusiliers of Providence Artillery Company of Providence Burnside Zouaves
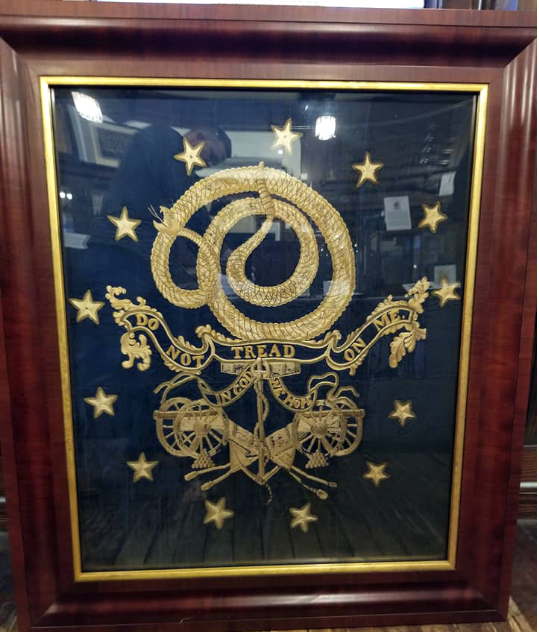
- The battle flag of the UTA: one of the earliest recorded uses of a rattlesnake on a flag, pre-dates the Gadsden Flag, this restored example from the early 1800s
- Founded: April 22, 1775
- Country: United States
- Allegiance: Rhode Island
- Branch: Continental Army
- Type: Infantry
- Part of: 1st Rhode Island Regiment
- Nickname: "UTA"
- Engagements: American Revolutionary War; Battle of Rhode Island; Dorr Rebellion
- Website: United Train of Artillery

Insignia
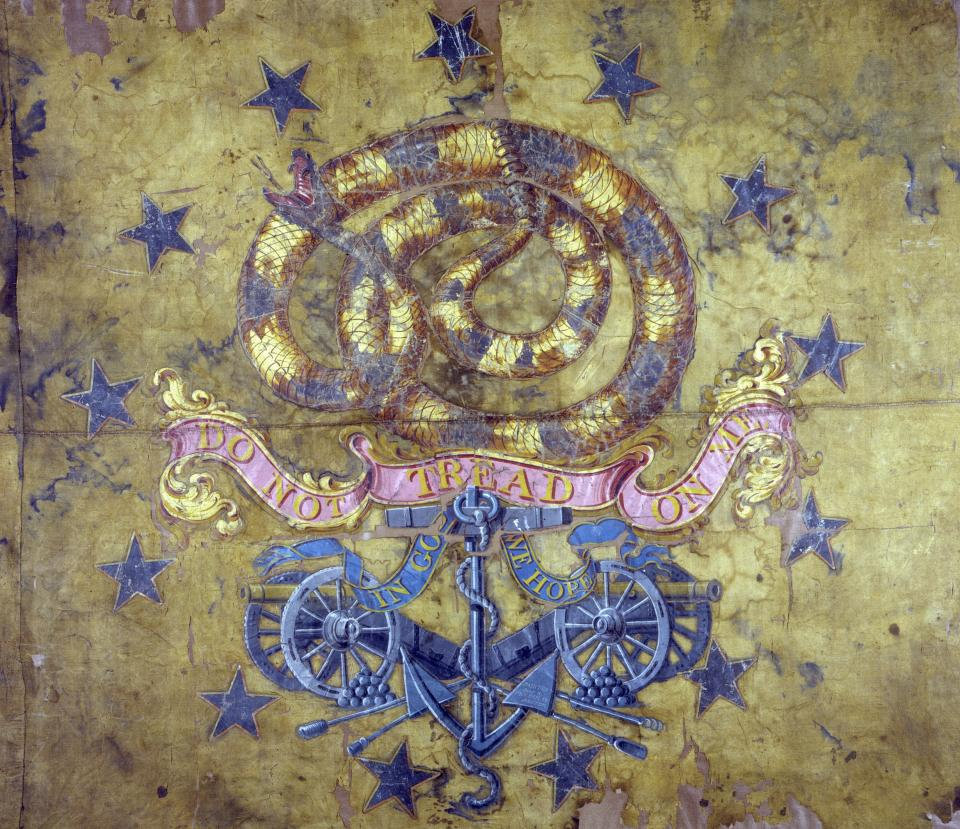
- Flag

The United Companies of the Train of Artillery of the Town of Providence, known as UTA, is a member of the Rhode Island Historic Commands, and takes part in many reenactments and state events. The unit was raised during the American Revolutionary War from the Fusiliers of Providence and the Artillery Company of Providence, making it one of the largest artillery units in Rhode Island. They fought at the Battle of Rhode Island and many other battles in the American Revolutionary War. The unit used a distinctive flag which featured a coiled timber rattlesnake with the motto "Do Not Tread On Me", above an anchor and the motto "In God We Hope", and a pair of cannons. The motif was surrounded by thirteen stars on a field of gold. This flag is one of the earliest uses of a rattlesnake on a flag and may have been the basis for the Gadsden flag. It is also one of the first uses of a circle of 13 stars to represent the thirteen colonies.

The unit also played a significant part in the Dorr Rebellion. After the Civil War, they were joined by Burnside's Zouaves, and they continued into the first half of the 20th century.

The Burnside Zouaves were not part of the UTA until after the American Civil War, not until 1869 and they were disbanded in 1871. This gives the Burnside Zouaves a birth in May 1861 as a militia unit in Providence, Rhode Island until 1871. They served as Company H, 10th Rhode Island Volunteer Infantry from May 26, 1862 until September 2, 1862 their service was in the defense of Washington DC during that time frame. After September 2, 1862, they continued as a militia unit and served as color guard to the state throughout the remainder of the war.
