= Rhode Island National Guard =

US state militia

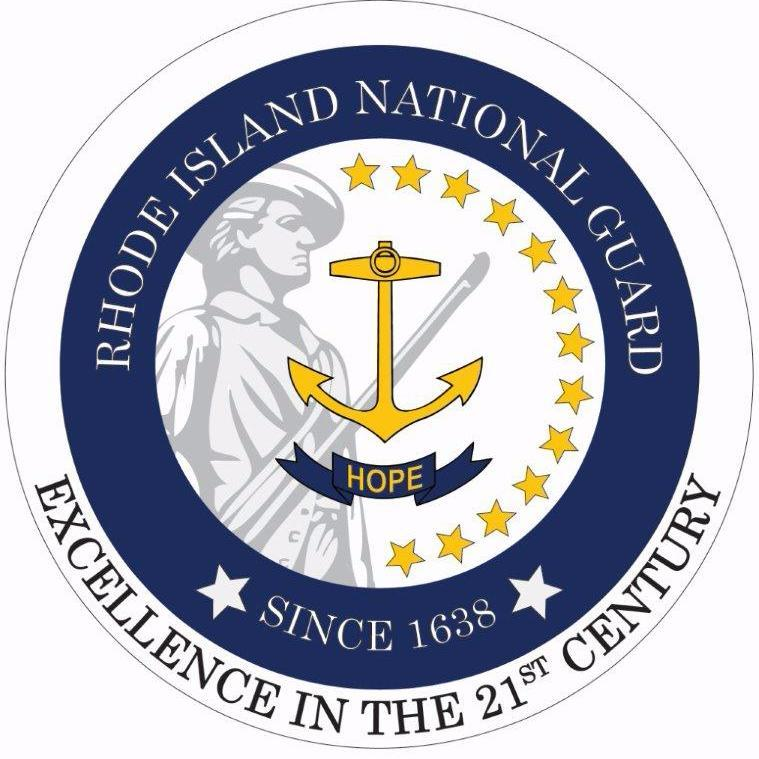
Rhode Island National Guard logo

The Rhode Island National Guard consists of the:

- Rhode Island Army National Guard
- Rhode Island Air National Guard
  - 102nd Information Warfare Squadron
  - 143d Airlift Wing
  - 281st Combat Communications Group
  - 282nd Combat Communications Squadron

== See also ==
- Rhode Island Naval Militia
- Rhode Island State Guard
- Rhode Island Independent Military Organizations
