= Rhode Island State Guard =

- The patch worn on the uniform of Rhode Island State Guardsmen during World War II.
- Active: 1918–1919; 1941–1947; 1950–1951
- Country: United States
- Allegiance: Rhode Island
- Branch: Army
- Type: State defense force
- Role: Military reserve force
- Size: 18 companies (World War I); 1 regiment (World War II)
- Part of: Rhode Island Department of Military and Veteran’s Affairs
- Garrison/HQ: Providence, RI
- World War I equipment: .38 revolvers 1,100 Springfield rifles 250 Krag–Jørgensen rifles

Commanders
- Civilian Leadership: Governor of Rhode Island
- State Military Leadership: Adjutant General of the State of Rhode Island

The Rhode Island State Guard is the currently inactive state defense force of Rhode Island. As a state defense force, the Rhode Island State Guard served as a state military unit which assumed the stateside duties of the Rhode Island National Guard when the National Guard was in federal service. However, unlike the National Guard, the State Guard, when organized, answers solely to the Governor of Rhode Island and by law cannot be federalized or deployed outside the borders of Rhode Island.

== History ==
=== History of predecessor units ===
Prior to the creation of the National Guard of the United States, the United States maintained a small professional army which, in times of war, would be supplemented by volunteer militia units raised by individual states. During the American Revolutionary War, the 1st Rhode Island Regiment was raised to serve in the Continental Army. Rhode Island raised multiple units to fight for the Union Army during the American Civil War. During the Spanish–American War, the 1st Regiment, Rhode Island Volunteers, was mustered into federal service but did not see combat.

=== World War I ===
The Militia Act of 1903 federalized state militias and placed them under federal control. When the National Guard was deployed abroad during World War I, states were forced to raise replacement units to provide homeland security capabilities. During World War I, Rhode Island raised 18 companies of State Guard, composed of 100 men each, and established a headquarters and supply company, a machine-gun detachment and a sanitary detachment.

In order to equip the State Guard, the state purchased .38 revolvers from private dealers, and obtained five hundred .45 caliber Springfield rifles and two hundred fifty .30 caliber Krag–Jørgensen rifles from the federal government. The state also possessed an additional six hundred .45 caliber Springfield rifles.

=== World War II ===
The State Guard was reactivated in 1940, reaching the size of one regiment. The Rhode Island State Guard reached a strength of over 1,300 men during the war. Rhode Island also formed the Rhode Island State Guard Reserve during the war.

=== Korean War ===
On the onset of the Korean War, several states, including Rhode Island, reactivated their state defense forces at cadre strength as a safeguard against the possibility of their National Guard units being federalized.

=== Cold War ===
The Rhode Island State Guard was reactivated in 1987 and renamed the Rhode Island State Defense Force. By 1990, it consisted of only three members.

== Legal status ==
State defense forces are given legal recognition by the federal government under Title 32, Section 109 of the United States Code. The authority to maintain independent chartered military organizations separate of the National Guard is recognized under Rhode Island Law.

Chapter 30-5, section 30-5-5 of the Rhode Island General Laws allows the Governor of Rhode Island to call and organize portions of the unorganized militia whenever it is deemed necessary, and required when the Rhode Island National Guard is in federal service.

== Legal protection ==
Under Rhode Island law, no employer may fire an employee due to the employee's membership in the Rhode Island State Guard, or due to their obligation to perform military service, or attempt to hinder their ability to perform military service. Nor may employers threaten or otherwise insinuate that an employee will suffer repercussions from the employer as a result of his or her service with the Rhode Island State Guard. Any employer or agent of an employer who is guilty of these offenses is guilty of a misdemeanor offense.

== See also ==
- Rhode Island Independent Military Organizations
  - Armory of the Kentish Guards
  - Artillery Company of Newport
- Rhode Island Naval Militia
- Rhode Island Wing Civil Air Patrol
