= Rhode Island Army National Guard =

Component of the US Army and military of the U.S. state of Rhode Island

- Shoulder sleeve insignia of the Rhode Island State Area Command (STARC)
- Active: 1638 – Present
- Country: United States
- Allegiance: Rhode Island
- Branch: United States Army
- Type: ARNG Headquarters Command
- Role: United States Army National Guard
- Part of: Rhode Island National Guard
- Garrison/HQ: 2841 South County Trail, East Greenwich, RI 02818

Commanders
- Current commander: Brig. Gen. Andrew Chevalier

Insignia
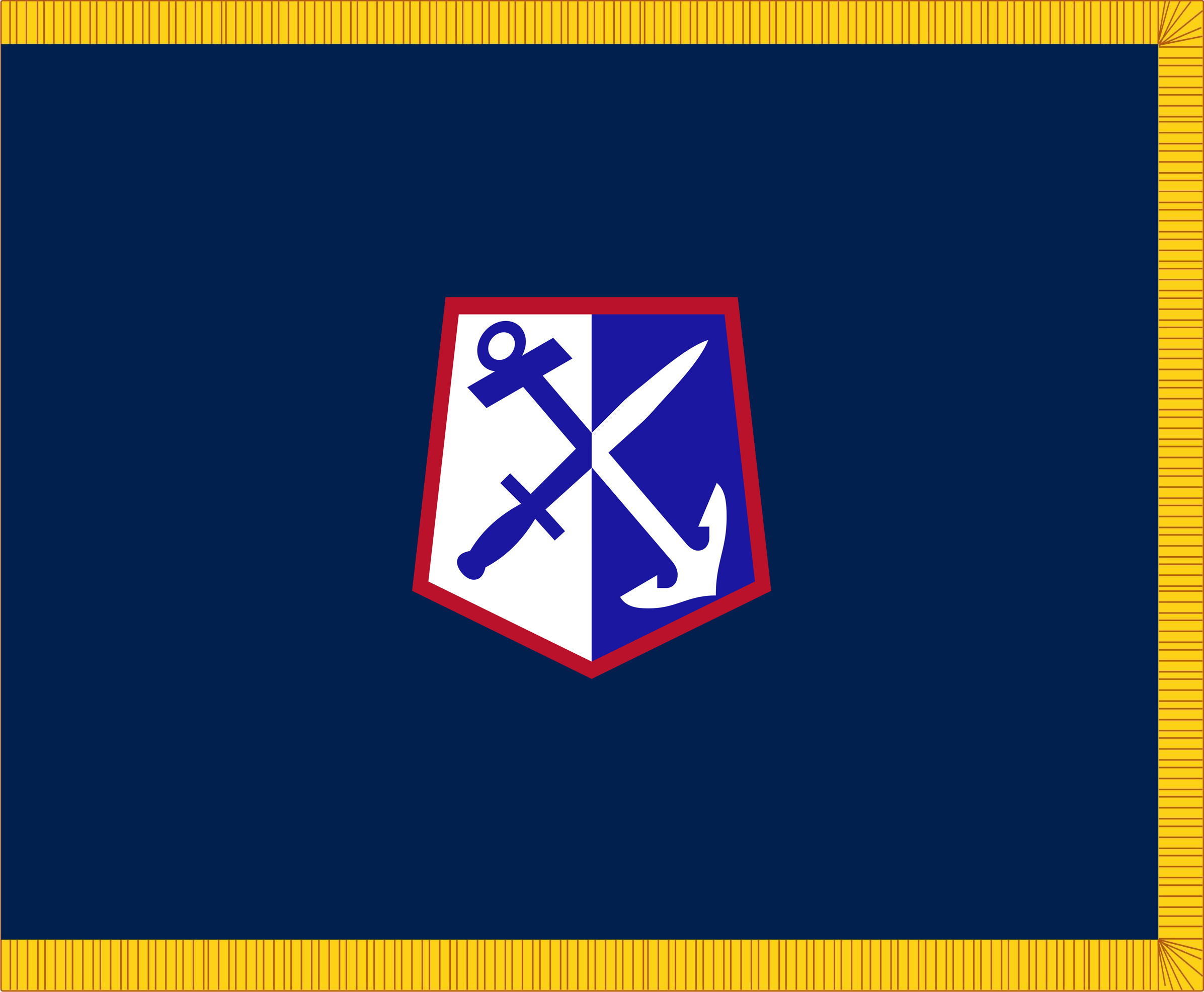
- Rhode Island Army National Guard Headquarters Flag

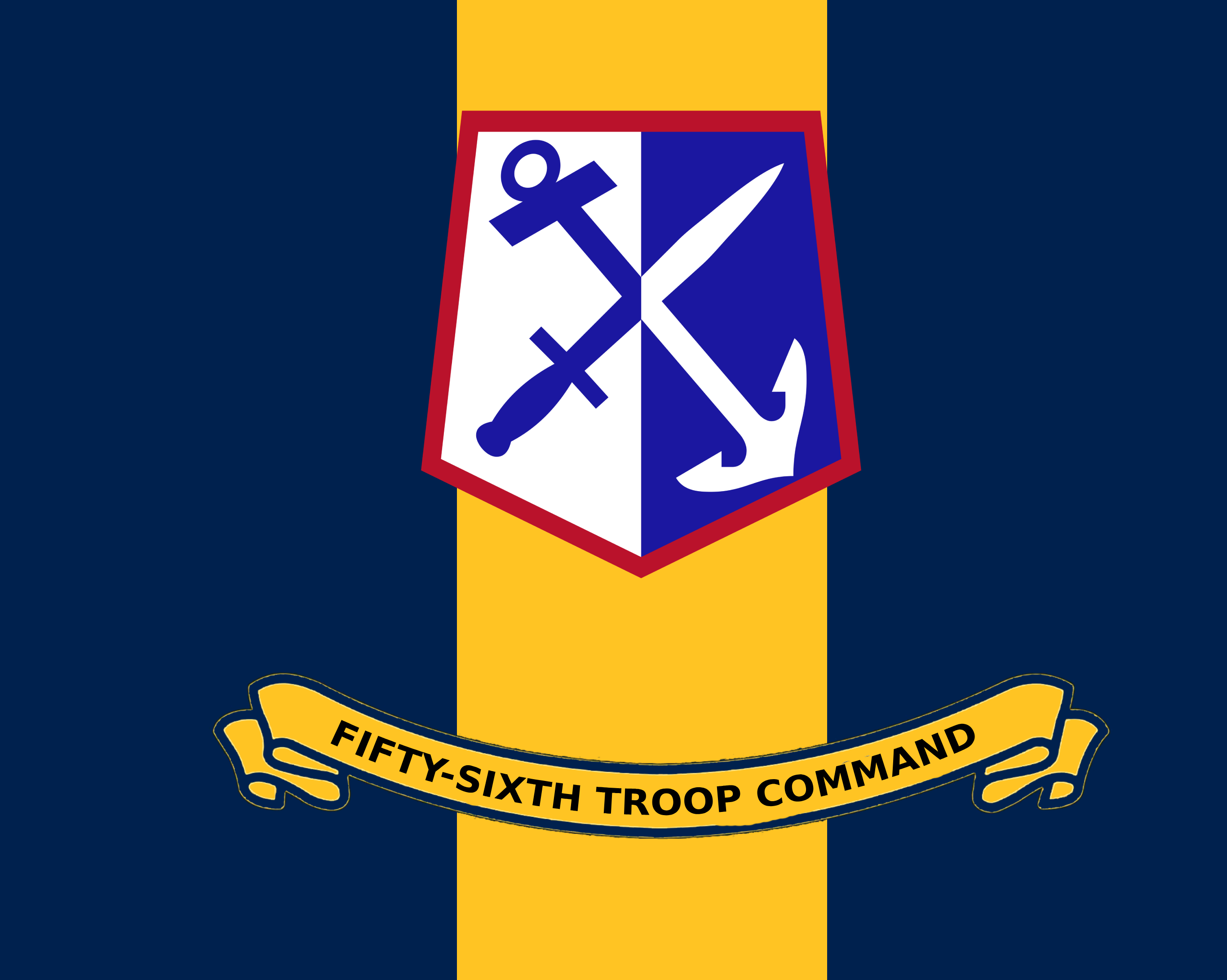
- Rhode Island Army National Guard 56th Troop Command Flag

- Rhode Island Army National Guard Crest

The Rhode Island Army National Guard (RIARNG) is the land force militia for the U.S. state of Rhode Island. It operates under Title 10 and Title 32 of the United States Code and operates under the command of the state governor while not in federal service. National Guard units may function under arms in a state status, therefore they may be called up for active duty by the governor to help respond to domestic emergencies and disasters, such as those caused by hurricanes, floods, or civil unrest.

Units of the Rhode Island Army National Guard may be called up for federal service. If federally activated, units operate as part of the Army National Guard of the United States, a reserve component of the United States Army.

The president may also call up members and units of the Rhode Island Army National Guard, with the consent of the state governor, to repel invasion, suppress rebellion, or execute federal laws if the United States or any of its states or territories are invaded or is in danger of invasion by a foreign nation, or if there's a rebellion or danger of a rebellion against the authority of the federal government, or if the president is unable with the regular armed forces to execute the laws of the United States.

The Rhode Island Army National Guard is a component of the United States Army and the United States National Guard and is maintained by the National Guard Bureau. Members and units are trained and equipped as part of the United States Army. The same ranks and insignia are used and National Guardsmen are eligible to receive all United States military awards in addition to state awards.

== History ==
=== Colonial era ===
A recruiting sergeant of the Rhode Island Militia's Newport Regiment in 1760

The Rhode Island National Guard traces it origins to May 13, 1638, when a trained band was raised in Portsmouth, Rhode Island. The unit was founded by "Freemen as a militia subject to call and expected to perform certain military duties in the protection of the people." This marked the beginning of the Rhode Island Militia, the official militia of the colony of Rhode Island and Providence Plantations.

During the colonial era, each city or town in Rhode Island had at least one militia company commanded by a captain or a lieutenant. In May 1673, future governor of Rhode Island John Cranston was appointed "captain in chief of the Colony Military Force" and two years later he was promoted to major. In 1683, Rhode Island's militia companies were organized into two regiments: the Regiment of the Islands and Regiment of the Main. Each regiment was upon its founding commanded by a major and both majors reported to the governor.

In 1714 the Militia of the Island was designated the 1st Regiment and the Militia of the Main Land was designated the 2nd Regiment. The 1st Regiment consisted of six companies and the 2nd Regiment had nine companies. The number of companies in each town varied with its population with Newport and Providence having three apiece. In 1719 the rank of the regimental commanders was increased to colonel. In 1731, a regiment was formed for each of the three then existing counties Newport, Providence and Kings which were designed the 1st, 2nd and 3d regiments respectively. The Newport County regiment had six companies, Providence County had 13 companies and Kings County had 9 companies.

=== American Revolution ===
During the American Revolution, Rhode Island militia sunk the Royal Navy schooner HMS Liberty in Newport, Rhode Island in response to the vessel carrying out anti-smuggling operations. On the night of June 10, 1772, another group of Rhode Island militia under Abraham Whipple seized and burned the British naval schooner HMS Gaspée in Narragansett Bay for the same reason. On April 22, 1775, following the Battles of Lexington and Concord in Massachusetts, the Rhode Island General Assembly raised a 1,500-strong "Army of Observation" under Brigadier General Nathanael Greene and sent it to Boston to serve in the newly-formed Continental Army under General George Washington. Another prominent Rhode Island Militia officer in the Revolutionary War was Major General James Mitchell Varnum, who fought in multiple major battles of the war. In July 1777, Captain William Barton led a detachment of 40 men which kidnapped British General Richard Prescott from Newport, Rhode Island to exchanged the captive American General Charles Lee After the war ended in 1783, the Rhode Island Militia was reorganized into five brigades: the Bristol County, the Kent County, the Newport County, the Providence County, and the Washington County Brigades.

=== Post-Revolution ===
Several militia units were mobilized to defend Rhode Island against possible British attack during the War of 1812.

=== American Civil War ===
With the outbreak of the Civil War in April 1861, Rhode Island Militia units formed the ten line companies of the 1st Rhode Island Detached Militia Regiment under the command of Colonel Ambrose Burnside. Additionally, the Providence Marine Corps of Artillery was mobilized as the 1st Rhode Island Battery. Both of these units fought at the First Battle of Bull Run, under the command of Major Joseph Pope Balch, who succeeded to command after Burnside was promoted to brigadier general. The 1st Rhode Island was discharged, along with the 1st Battery, when its 90-day Federal service obligation expired on August 2, 1861.

=== Post-Civil War ===
After the Civil War, the RI Militia underwent a major re-organization which organized the units into a brigade consisting of two infantry regiments, a separate infantry battalion, an artillery battalion and a squadron of cavalry. Annual training was a six-day period initially at Oakland Beach in Warwick and later moved to Quonset Point in North Kingstown after a purpose-built camp for the Rhode Island Militia was developed there.

During the Spanish–American War, a regiment consisting of three battalions of four companies each was mobilized and called the 1st Rhode Island Volunteer Infantry. In addition to the 1st RIVI, two artillery batteries were mobilized. None of these units were sent overseas.

=== Militia Act of 1903 ===
The greatest turning point in the history of the Rhode Island National Militia, and all other state militias, was the passage of the Militia Act of 1903. This act, also known as the Dick Act, was passed with the support of Secretary of War Elihu Root, who sought to reform the United States Army. The key provision of the Dick Act was that state militia forces would receive federal funding for paying their members as well providing equipment in exchange for adhering to the federal standards of training and organization. State militia forces adhering to federal standards were called the National Guard to distinguish them from more traditional militia forces.

The Rhode Island Militia was officially re-designated as the Rhode Island National Guard by General Order No. 9 on April 15, 1907. The two Infantry regiments of the Brigade of Rhode Island Militia were re-organized as Coast Artillery companies in order to provide a reserve of soldiers trained to man the five coast defense forts in Rhode Island. Other units were a Cavalry squadron and a Light Artillery Battery.

A few of the chartered units of the Rhode Island Militia chose not to convert to National Guard units. This was mostly because they would be denied the privilege of electing their own officers. These units included the Artillery Company of Newport, Bristol Train of Artillery and the Kentish Guards. These units, along with several others, today comprise the Historic Military Commands of the Rhode Island Militia.

The position of commanding general of the militia was combined with that of the state adjutant general so the position of adjutant general was transformed from having only administrative responsibilities to having command authority over the units of the National Guard.

=== Mexican intervention and First World War ===
In 1916, Light Battery "A", Rhode Island Field Artillery, was called into federal service on June 19, 1916, for duty with General John J. Pershing to fight against Pancho Villa during the Mexican Expedition. The following year, Battery "A", Rhode Island Field Artillery, expanded to form the 1st Battalion, 103d Field Artillery, an element of the 26th "Yankee" Division during World War I.

The 103d was shipped to France with the 26th Division and saw action in the Champagne-Marne, Aisne-Marne, St. Mihiel and Meuse-Argonne campaigns in 1918.

The coast artillery companies, which were descended from infantry units, were also mobilized in 1917 and were used to garrison Rhode Island's coast defense forts for the duration of the war.

Most Rhode Island units were demobilized in December 1918 following the signing of the Armistice with Germany on November 11.

=== Second World War ===
During World War II, the majority of the Rhode Island National Guard units belonged to the 43d Infantry Division under General Douglas MacArthur for service in the Southwest Pacific, fighting in the New Guinea, Northern Solomons, and Luzon campaigns. Units which served with the 43d Infantry Division included the 103d and 169th Field Artillery battalions and the 118th Engineer Battalion. Stateside, the 243d Coast Artillery Regiment served with the Harbor Defenses of Narragansett Bay.

=== Korean War ===
During the Korean War, the Rhode Island National Guard had units serving with the 43rd Infantry Division, which was mobilized for service in Germany, and the 705th Anti Aircraft Artillery Battalion which served on the island of Okinawa.

=== Vietnam ===
During the U.S. intervention in Vietnam, the Rhode Island National Guard had two units called into Federal service. The 107th Signal Company was activated on May 13, 1968 and served in the Republic of Vietnam until October 1969. The 115th Military Police Company was activated for duty at West Point, NY until December 1969. During this mobilization, individual soldiers from the 115th MP Company were "levied" and sent to serve in Vietnam to replace casualties.

=== Post-Vietnam ===
The Great Blizzard of 1978, which occurred on February 6, 1978, caused the largest mobilization of Rhode Island Guard units since the Korean War. Guardsmen assisted stranded motorists as well as in snow removal and providing emergency transportation.

The 103rd Field Artillery Brigade was formed within the RI ARNG in 1979, and in 1984-85, consisted of the 1st and 2nd Battalions of the 103rd Field Artillery Regiment.

=== Gulf War ===
During Operation Desert Shield and Desert Storm the Rhode Island National Guard had four units mobilized for duty. The 143rd Airlift Wing, out of Quonset Point, flew military airlift mission from the U.S. into Europe transporting passengers and cargo. The 118th Military Police Battalion, attached to the 14th Military Police Brigade and to the 1st Infantry Division during actual combat operations in Iraq, conducted Main Supply Route Security, Battlefield Circulation Control, and temporary holding of Enemy Prisoners of War; the 119th Military Police Company oversaw three EPW (enemy prisoners of war) camps; and the 115th Military Police Company provided base security, conducted VIP escort/security missions, and custom missions.

=== Interim 1991 to 2001 ===
The only extended overseas deployment of Rhode Island National Guard soldiers in this period was when the 119th Military Police Company was deployed to the Kapos Airbase in Taszar, Hungary from August 2000 to March 2001. It was a subordinate unit of the United States Army Support Element Taszar (USASET), formerly National Support Element Taszar, in support Operation Joint Forge, which was the NATO operation providing stability operations in Bosnia. Soldiers of the 119th provided convoy escorts between Taszar and NATO bases in Bosnia, main supply route patrols, law and order, force protection and various missions in support of the NATO Stabilization Force (SFOR). A small public affairs unit of the Rhode Island National Guard was also deployed to Taszar in support of SFOR in this time frame.

=== Global war on terrorism / Operation Iraqi Freedom ===
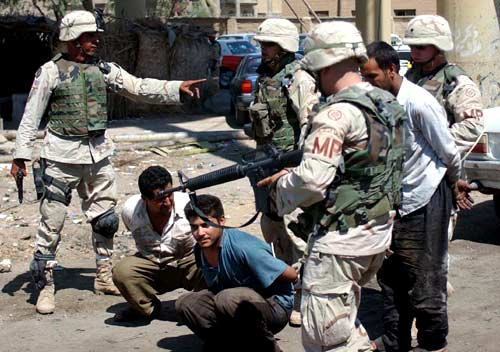
Rhode Island Army National Guardsmen in Fallujah, Iraq, 28 July 2003

The current War on Terror has seen the largest levels of mobilization and deployment of Rhode Island National Guard troops since the Second World War.

In early 2002 the Headquarters and Headquarters Company of the 43d Military Police Brigade was mobilized and sent to Guantanamo Bay, Cuba to provide the nucleus of the Headquarters for Joint Task Force 160 (JTF 160) in charge of detention of illegal combatants detained in operations in Afghanistan. JTF 160 was responsible for opening Camp Delta which was a detention facility which was a great improvement over Camp X-Ray where detainees were kept initially. Widely publicized and controversial interrogations of detainees were carried out by Joint Task Force 170 which was responsible for intelligence gathering at Guantanamo Bay. The 43d MP Brigade returned to Rhode Island in November 2002.

In February 2003 the 118th Military Police Battalion, along with its subordinate units the 115th and 119th Military Police companies, was mobilized and sent to Kuwait, and later Iraq. The units were overseas from April 2003 to April 2004. Two soldiers from the 115th Military Police Company were killed in action and another in an accident. The 115th MP Company received the prestigious Valorous Unit Award for its combat service in Fallujah in 2003.

In late August 2005, a composite company from the 43d Military Police Brigade was sent to New Orleans to provide security and humanitarian assistance to survivors of Hurricane Katrina.

From 2003 to 2011 every unit of the Rhode Island National Guard, with the exception of the 88th Army Band and the Joint Forces Headquarters, would be mobilized at least once for service in either Iraq or Afghanistan.

According to the RING and RIEMA (Rhode Island Emergency Management Agency) Annual Report 2008, on 6 September 2008, the Headquarters and Headquarters Company of the 103rd Field Artillery Brigade and one of its component units, the 1043rd Maintenance Company, were to inactivate on 6 September 2008. The other RING unit of the brigade, the 1st Battalion, 103rd Field Artillery (1/103rd FA), was to be reassigned elsewhere. The brigade was originally formed in 1979. The 1043rd Maintenance Company was merged with the 1207th Transportation Company and reorganized as the 1207th Forward Support Company (FSC) which became and integral unit of the 1/103rd FA providing maintenance and logistical support to the battalion.

=== COVID-19 Pandemic response efforts ===
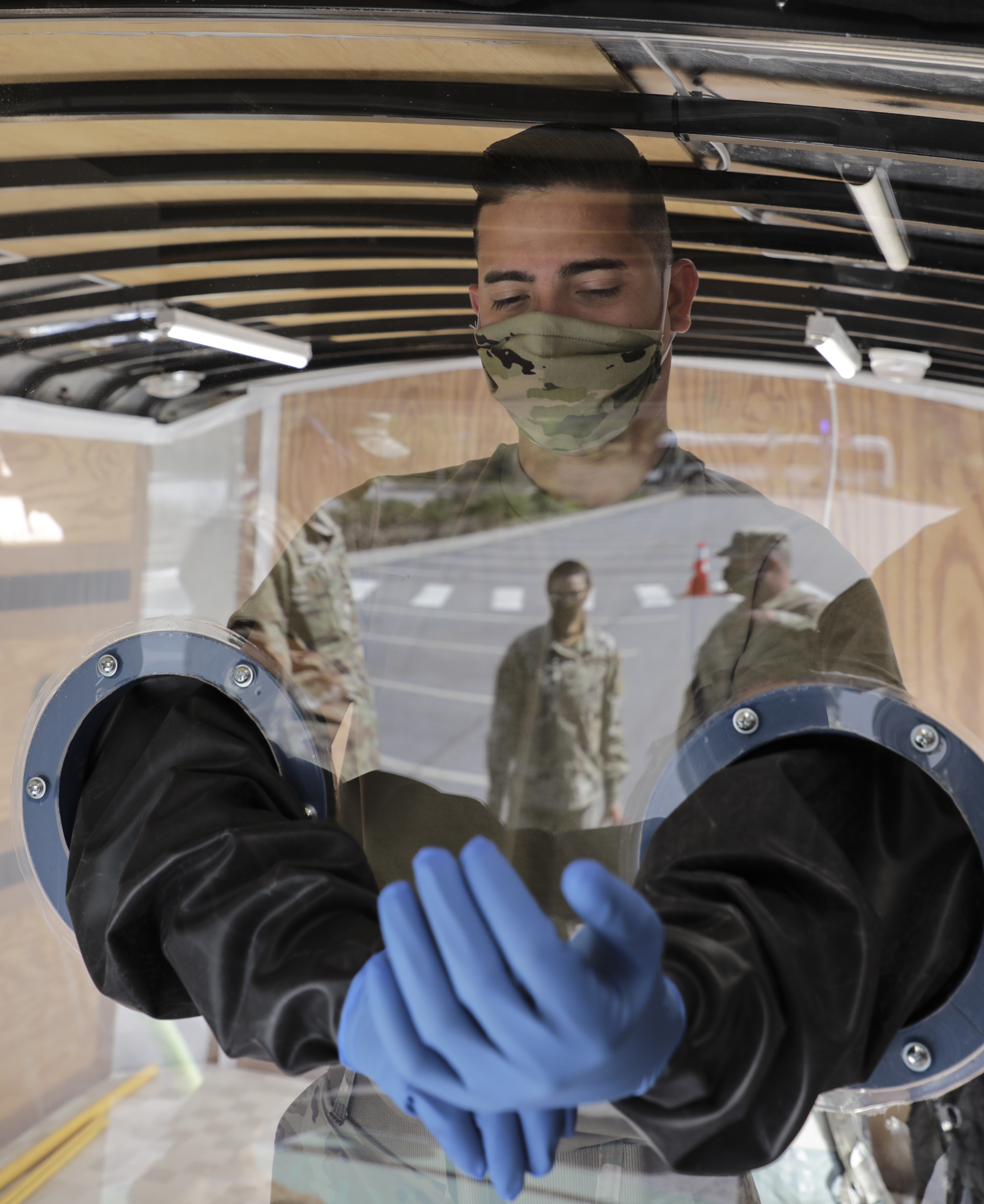
National Guard perform multiple tasks at a COVID-19 test site at Rhode Island College in May 2020

During the beginning of the pandemic Governor Gina Raimondo ordered the Rhode Island National Guard and the Rhode Island State Police to stop motorists with New York license plates, as well as move door-to-door to find people who may have traveled recently from New York, to ask them to quarantine. Also anyone who had moved from New York state to Rhode Island in the past two weeks were asked to self-quarantine for 14 days in order to help stop the spread of the virus in Rhode Island.

Upon EUA approval of the Pfizer and Moderna vaccines, the Rhode Island National Guard was called upon by the Governor to develop a task force to plan for and execute the mass vaccination of the state of Rhode Island. From January through June 2021, Task Force Vax oversaw the administration of more than 336,000 vaccines to residents of Rhode Island, accounting for roughly 30% of all vaccinations administered within the state.

== Strategic plan ==
Mission:"Provide well-trained, well-led, and well-equipped mission-ready units in support of the National Military Strategy and, as required, state and local officials."

Vision: "A ready, relevant, and reliable force of Citizen Soldiers capable of conducting full-spectrum operations in joint and inter-agency environments."

== Organization ==
As of February 2026 the Rhode Island Army National Guard consists of the following units:

- Joint Force Headquarters-Rhode Island, Army Element, in East Greenwich
  - Headquarters and Headquarters Detachment, Joint Force Headquarters-Rhode Island, Army Element, in East Greenwich
  - Rhode Island Recruiting & Retention Battalion, in Cranston
  - Rhode Island Medical Detachment, in Providence
  - Special Operations Detachment-Global (Airborne), in East Greenwich (supports United States Special Operations Command)
  - 13th Civil Support Team (WMD), in Coventry
  - Camp Fogarty Training Center, in East Greenwich
  - Army Aviation Support Facility #1, at Quonset State Airport
  - Combined Support Maintenance Shop #1, in East Greenwich
  - Field Maintenance Shop #2, in Warren
  - Field Maintenance Shop #3, in Warwick
  - Field Maintenance Shop #4, in East Greenwich
  - 43rd Military Police Brigade, in Cranston
    - Headquarters and Headquarters Company, 43rd Military Police Brigade, in Cranston
    - 118th Military Police Battalion, in Warwick
      - Headquarters and Headquarters Detachment, 118th Military Police Battalion, in Warwick
      - 115th Military Police Company (Combat Support), in East Greenwich
      - 169th Military Police Company (Combat Support), in Warwick
    - 1st Battalion, 103rd Field Artillery Regiment, in Providence (M777A2) (part of 197th Field Artillery Brigade)
      - Headquarters and Headquarters Battery, 1st Battalion, 103rd Field Artillery Regiment, in Providence
      - Battery A, 1st Battalion, 103rd Field Artillery Regiment, in Providence
      - Battery B, 1st Battalion, 103rd Field Artillery Regiment, in North Smithfield
      - Battery C, 1st Battalion, 103rd Field Artillery Regiment, in Lebanon (NH) — (New Hampshire Army National Guard)
      - 1207th Forward Support Company, in East Greenwich
        - Detachment 1, 1207th Forward Support Company, in Lebanon (NH) — (New Hampshire Army National Guard)
  - 56th Troop Command, in East Greenwich
    - Headquarters and Headquarters Detachment, 56th Troop Command, in East Greenwich
    - Company A, 2nd Battalion, 19th Special Forces Group (Airborne), in Middletown
    - Company C, 1st Battalion, 143rd Infantry Regiment (Airborne), in East Greenwich
    - Company A, 1st Battalion, 182nd Infantry Regiment, in East Greenwich
    - 56th Quartermaster Detachment (Aerial Delivery), in East Greenwich
    - 88th Army Band, in East Greenwich
    - 110th Mobile Public Affairs Detachment, in Cranston
    - 643rd Quartermaster Platoon (Field Feeding), in East Greenwich
    - 644th Quartermaster Platoon (Field Feeding), in East Greenwich
    - 861st Engineer Company (Engineer Support Company), in East Greenwich
    - 1st Battalion (General Support Aviation), 126th Aviation Regiment, at Quonset State Airport
      - Headquarters and Headquarters Company, 1st Battalion (General Support Aviation), 126th Aviation Regiment, at Quonset State Airport
        - Detachment 1, Headquarters and Headquarters Company, 1st Battalion (General Support Aviation), 126th Aviation Regiment, at Stockton Army Airfield (CA) — (California Army National Guard)
      - Company A (CAC), 1st Battalion (General Support Aviation), 126th Aviation Regiment, at Quonset State Airport (UH-60L Black Hawk)
      - Company B (Heavy Lift), 1st Battalion (General Support Aviation), 126th Aviation Regiment, at Stockton Army Airfield (CA) (CH-47F) — (California Army National Guard)
      - Company C (MEDEVAC), 1st Battalion (General Support Aviation), 126th Aviation Regiment, at Bangor Air National Guard Base (ME) (HH-60M Black Hawk) — (Maine Army National Guard)
        - Detachment 1, Company C (MEDEVAC), 1st Battalion (General Support Aviation), 126th Aviation Regiment, at Wilmington Airport (DE) — (Delaware Army National Guard)
        - Detachment 2, Company C (MEDEVAC), 1st Battalion (General Support Aviation), 126th Aviation Regiment, at Raleigh–Durham Airport (NC) — (North Carolina Army National Guard)
      - Company D (AVUM), 1st Battalion (General Support Aviation), 126th Aviation Regiment, at Quonset State Airport
        - Detachment 1, Company D (AVUM), 1st Battalion (General Support Aviation), 126th Aviation Regiment, at Stockton Army Airfield (CA) — (California Army National Guard)
      - Company E (Forward Support), 1st Battalion (General Support Aviation), 126th Aviation Regiment, at Quonset State Airport
        - Detachment 1, Company E (Forward Support), 1st Battalion (General Support Aviation), 126th Aviation Regiment, at Stockton Army Airfield (CA) — (California Army National Guard)
      - Company F (ATS), 1st Battalion (General Support Aviation), 126th Aviation Regiment, at Los Alamitos Army Airfield (CA) — (California Army National Guard)
      - Company G (MEDEVAC), 1st Battalion (General Support Aviation), 126th Aviation Regiment, at Quonset State Airport (HH-60M Black Hawk)
        - Detachment 1, Company G (MEDEVAC), 1st Battalion (General Support Aviation), 126th Aviation Regiment, at Wilmington Airport (DE) — (Delaware Army National Guard)
      - Company A, 2nd Battalion (Fixed Wing), 245th Aviation Regiment (Detachment 23, Operational Support Airlift Activity), at Quonset State Airport (C-12 Huron)
  - 243rd Regiment, Regional Training Institute, at Camp Varnum

Aviation unit abbreviations: CAC — Command Aviation Company; MEDEVAC — Medical evacuation; AVUM — Aviation Unit Maintenance; ATS — Air Traffic Service

== Adjutants General of Rhode Island ==
- Brigadier General Elisha Dyer, Sr., 1840–1845 (also served as Governor of Rhode Island)
- Brigadier General Elisha Dyer Jr., February 7, 1882 – October 31, 1895 (also served as Governor of Rhode Island)
- Brigadier General Frederic M. Sackett, November 1, 1895 – January 31, 1911
- Brigadier General Charles Wheaton Abbot, Jr., February 1, 1911 – November 29, 1923
- Major General Peter Leo Cannon, 19 February 1941 – 9 August 1945
- Major General Leonard Holland, January 1961 – August 1983 (longest serving Adjutant General of Rhode Island)
- Major General John W. Kiely, 1983–1990
- Major General N. Andre Trudeau, 1990–1995
- Major General Reginald Centracchio, 1 August 1995 – 1 September 2005
- Major General Robert T. Bray, 17 February 2006 – 1 July 2011
- Major General Kevin R. McBride, 1 July 2011 – June 2015
- Major General Christopher P. Callahan, 5 August 2015 – 31 January 2025
- Brigadier General Andrew J. Chevalier, 31 January 2025 – present

== See also ==
- Rhode Island Air National Guard
- Rhode Island Naval Militia
- Rhode Island State Guard
- Rhode Island Independent Military Organizations
- List of United States militia units in the American Revolutionary War
