= Rhode Island Naval Militia =

The Rhode Island Naval Militia is the inactive naval militia of Rhode Island. Along with the Rhode Island National Guard and the Rhode Island State Guard, it is one of the military forces available to the Governor of Rhode Island.

== History ==
The Rhode Island Naval Militia traces its roots to the American Revolutionary War, when the Rhode Island State Navy was initiated in June 1775 with the commissioning of two sloops, the Washington and the Katy (later renamed Providence), for the purpose of repelling HMS Rose from Rhode Island waters. When the Continental Navy was formed in late 1775 the Alfred and Providence became part of it.

In the 1890s, during the first decade of the invention of the modern naval militia, the Rhode Island Naval Militia was organized as a torpedo unit and frequently trained at the Navy's torpedo school on Coaster's Island near Newport. The Rhode Island Naval Militia first saw combat during the Spanish–American War when one hundred forty two members of Rhode Island Naval Battalion were federalized and served alongside the United States Navy.

USS Miantonomoh served briefly under the Rhode Island Naval Militia before her decommissioning in November 1895. After being decommissioned on 8 October 1898, USS Kanawha was loaned to the Rhode Island Naval Militia on 12 December 1898; however, Kanawha was returned to the Navy on 12 August 1899 and transferred to the War Department. In 1910, the naval militia was assigned USS Aileen. By 1916, the naval militia maintained an aeronautic section.

In early 1916 recently retired Lieutenant (junior grade) Richard E. Byrd, USN was appointed as Inspector and Instructor of the RINM. He is credited with making great strides in improving the efficiency of the RINM and was elected by its members as its commander in December 1916. In April 1917, following the US declaration of war against Germany, Byrd was recalled to active duty. Byrd went on to lead the first flight over the North Pole in 1926 and to lead five expeditions to Antarctica.

The RINM was called into active service during World War I but was not reformed after the war since the US Naval Reserve had taken the place of state naval militias.

In the early 1970s, due to historical interest caused by the Bicentennial of the American Revolution, the RI Naval Militia was reformed as one of the state's historic military commands with the replica sloop Providence as its flagship. Interest in the historic Naval Militia was short lived and it disbanded.

== Personnel ==
Naval militias are recognized under federal law and are equipped by the federal government, and therefore, membership requirements are partially set according to federal standards. Under 10 U.S. Code § 7854, in order to be eligible for access to "vessels, material, armament, equipment, and other facilities of the Navy and the Marine Corps available to the Navy Reserve and the Marine Corps Reserve", at least 95% of members of the naval militia must also be members of the United States Navy Reserve or the United States Marine Corps Reserve.

== Legal status ==
Naval militias of U.S. states are recognized as part of the organized militia of the United States under 10 U.S. Code §7851. Rhode Island law also recognizes the Rhode Island Naval Militia as a component of the militia of Rhode Island. Therefore, although inactive, an act of legislature by the Rhode Island General Assembly would return the Rhode Island Naval Militia to active service.

== Legal protection ==
Under Rhode Island law, no employer may fire an employee due to the employee's membership in the Rhode Island Naval Militia, or due to their obligation to perform military service, or attempt to hinder their ability to perform military service. Nor may employers threaten or otherwise insinuate that an employee will suffer repercussions from the employer as a result of his or her service with the Rhode Island Naval Militia. Any employer or agent of an employer who is guilty of these offenses is guilty of a misdemeanor offense.
