= Bristol Fourth of July Parade =

Annual parade in Bristol, Rhode Island

The Military, Civic and Fireman’s Fourth of July Parade
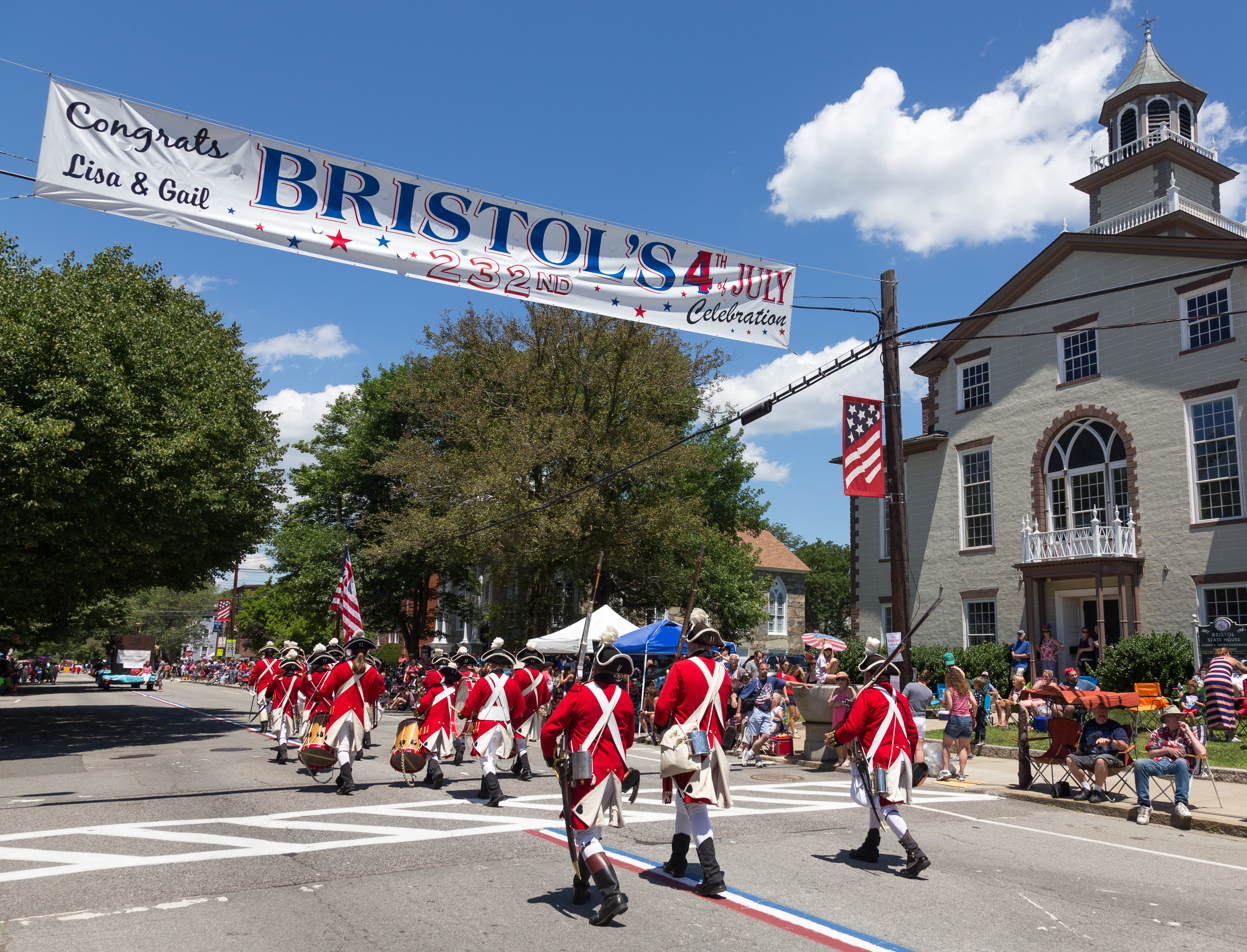
- The 232nd parade in 2017
- Genre: Parade
- Date: Independence Day
- Frequency: Annual
- Locations: Bristol, Rhode Island, United States
- Years active: 238
- Inaugurated: 1785
- Most recent: July 4, 2026
- Next event: July 4, 2027
- Attendance: up to 100,000
- Patron: Bristol Fourth of July General Committee
- Website: Bristol 4th of July

Bristol Fourth of July Parade, or Bristol Fourth of July Celebration (officially known as the Military, Civic and Firemen's Parade), founded in 1785, is a nationally known Fourth of July parade in Bristol, Rhode Island. The parade is part of the oldest Independence Day celebration in the United States of America.

== History ==
The annual official and historic celebrations (Patriotic Exercises) were established in 1785 by Rev. Henry Wight of the First Congregational Church and veteran of the Revolutionary War, and later by Rev. Wight as the Parade, and continue today, organized by the Bristol Fourth of July Committee. The festivities officially start on June 14, Flag Day, beginning a period of outdoor concerts, soap-box races and a firefighters' muster at Independence Park. The celebration climaxes on July 4 with the oldest annual parade in the United States, "The Military, Civic and Firemen's Parade", an event that draws over 200,000 people from Rhode Island and around the world. These elaborate celebrations give Bristol its nickname, "America's most patriotic town". In 1785 the Bristol Fourth of July Celebration (beginning as the Patriotic Exercises) was founded and the Fourth of July has been celebrated every year in Bristol since that date, although the parade itself was canceled several times. In years when July 4 falls on a Sunday, the parade is held on Monday the 5th.

=== Buddy Cianci and the parade ===
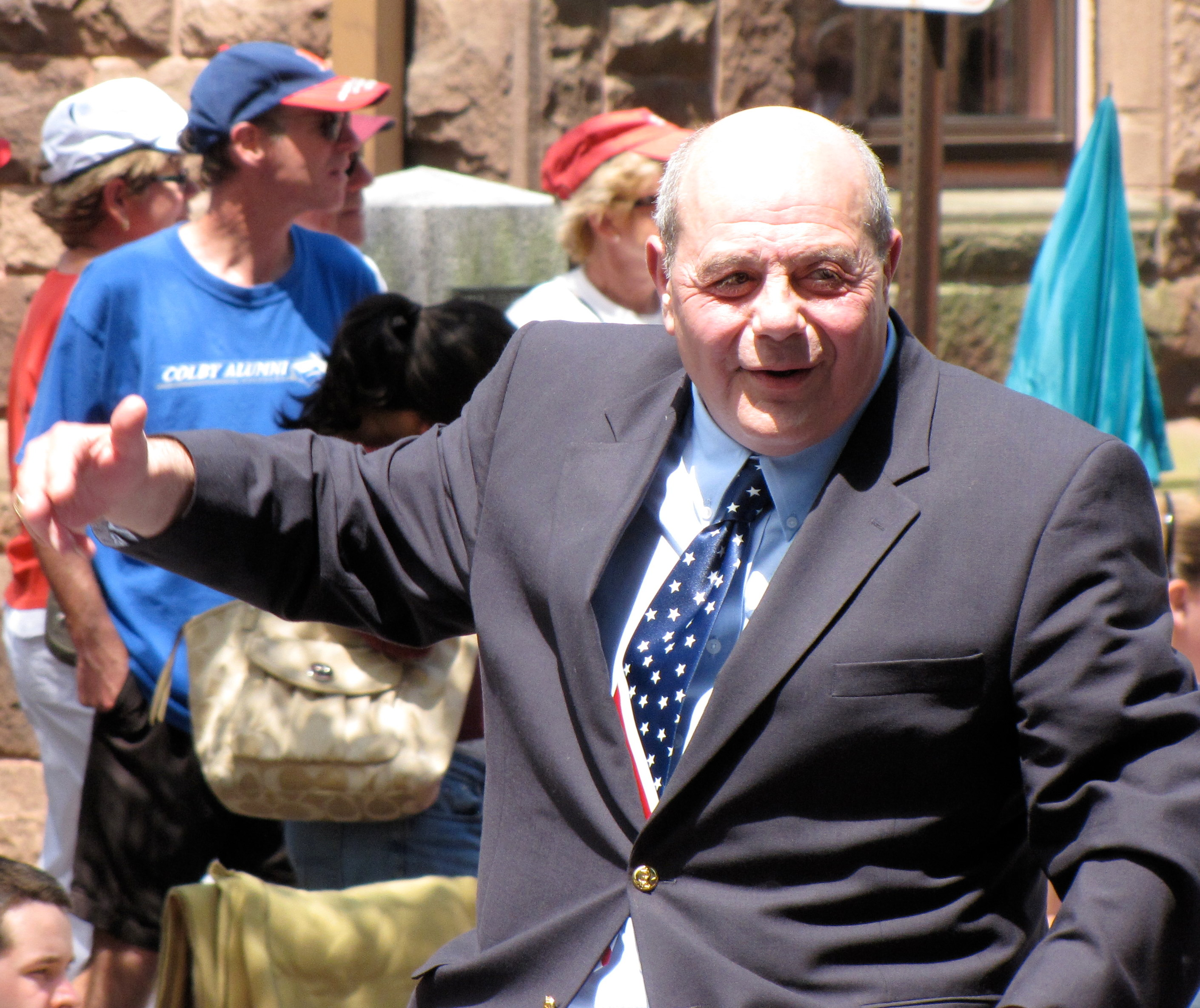
Buddy Cianci returned after serving his jail sentence to march again in the 2009 parade

Buddy Cianci, Providence's longest-serving mayor, had a long and controversial history with the Bristol parade. In the 1970s, parade rules stipulated that only elected federal, state, and Bristol town officials were invited to participate; mayors of Providence were not invited. In spite of this, Cianci marched in the parade every year after his 1975 election, in violation of the rules, until parade organizers sent a letter censuring him after the 1979 parade. The Bristol Town Council explicitly voted to ban Cianci from the 1980 parade, a year in which Cianci was running for governor against J. Joseph Garrahy, who, as sitting governor, was welcome to march. The Bristol police chief vowed to arrest anyone who caused a disturbance. A record 300,000 spectators showed up for the 1980 parade, waiting to see what would happen. In the end, when Cianci's helicopter touched down at Colt High School, officials backed down in the face of overwhelming crowd support for Cianci; he received bigger cheers than any other guest that day.

In 1984, after pleading "no contest" to a charge of assault, Cianci skipped the parade; a clown dressed in a prison uniform, carrying a ball and chain, mocked him in his absence. In 1991, Cianci caused some controversy by marching in front of the parade marshal, which prompted the parade chairman to comment, "Cianci is rude and he doesn't deserve to be invited back." In 1997 and 1998, Cianci marched with a "small army" of police, including police rescue boats on trailers, a bicycle patrol, and police officers squirting spectators with water rifles. This proved too much for the parade subcommittee, who unanimously dis-invited Cianci from the 1999 parade. Cianci skipped 1999, but returned in 2000 to shouting and cheers, despite having been indicted this time on federal corruption charges. Cianci's last appearance as sitting mayor was in 2002, after his conviction. Instead of riding his usual horse, Cianci walked this time, and he was frequently stopped by fans along the route to take photos and to shake his hand.

In 2003, new Providence Mayor David Cicilline marched in the parade, accompanied by a more modest contingent than his predecessor.

=== 2009 parade ===
The Rhode Island Tea-Party Association applied to enter the parade with a float featuring a representation of the British ship Beaver, which was ransacked by colonists dressed as Native Americans in 1773 at the Boston Tea Party. Staffing the float was Helen Glover, a radio personality from Providence, RI–based WHJJ 920 AM.

The Bristol Fourth of July Committee ejected the Rhode Island Tea-Party Association float from the 2009 parade and permanently banned them from all future parades for distributing pocket copies of the Declaration of Independence, the U.S. Constitution and Bill of Rights along the parade route. Such handouts are prohibited at the Parade on the grounds that people (especially children) running up to floats to get them pose a danger.

=== 2014 parade ===
Attendance at the 2014 parade was reportedly "much lighter than usual" due to bad weather from Tropical Storm Arthur. The parade was ended abruptly at 1 p.m. with a sudden thunderstorm. Marchers included Rhode Island's congressional delegation at the front of the line, including Senators Jack Reed and Sheldon Whitehouse and Reps. Jim Langevin and David Cicilline. Former Providence mayor Buddy Cianci and Gubernatorial candidate Gina Raimondo also attended.

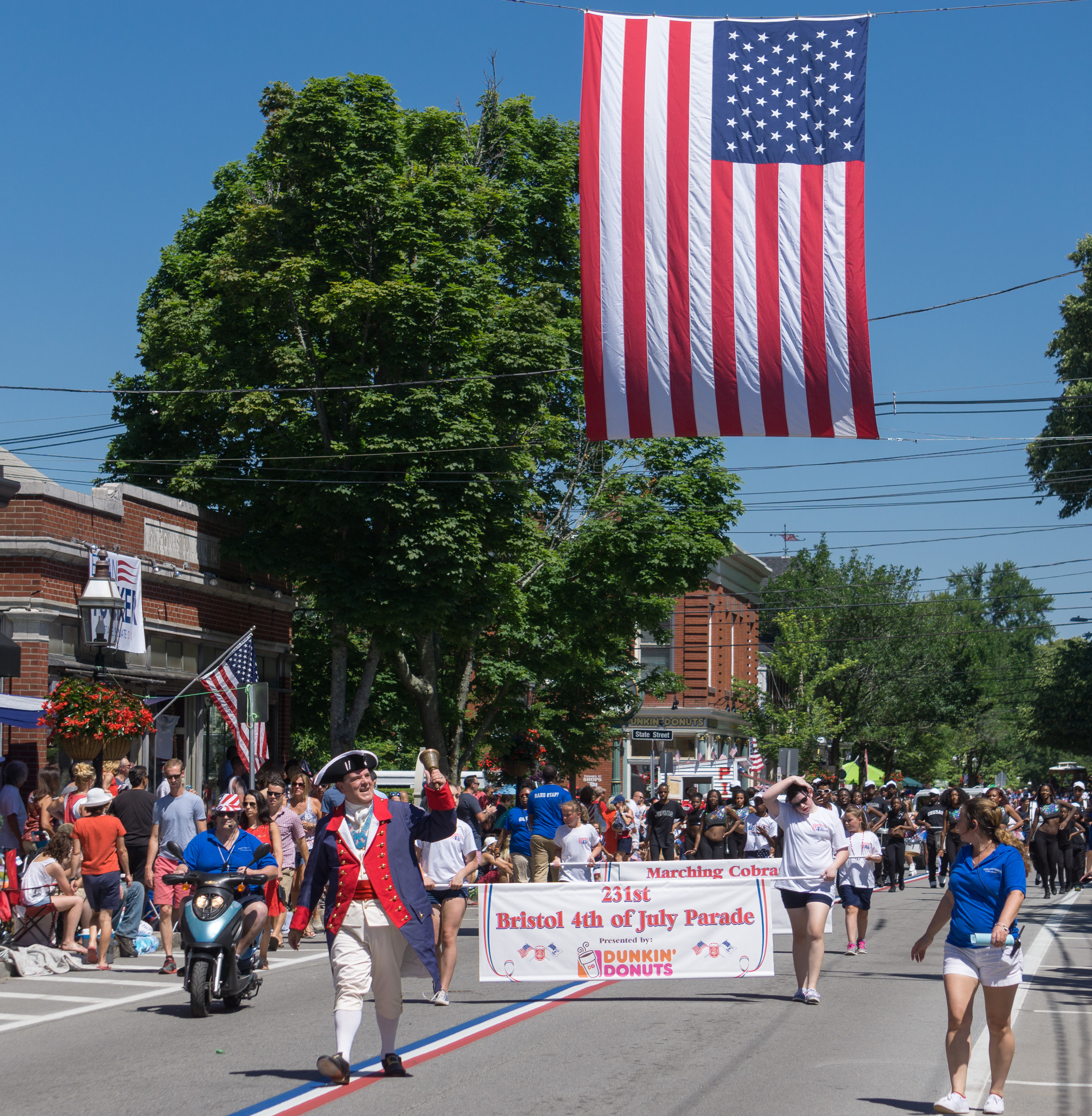
The head of the 2016 parade.

=== 2015 parade ===
An estimated 50,000 people attended the parade in 2015.

Michael Rielly becomes Bristol's official Town Crier after Gerry MacNeill retires from the position after 23 years.

=== 2016 parade route change controversy ===
In early January 2016, the Bristol Fourth of July Committee voted to shorten the parade route from 2.4 miles to just under two miles, in order to clear roads to make it easier for first responders to react in the event of an emergency. Another reason given was that a longtime drum corps threatened to drop out because the route was too long. The revised route would begin with the 231st parade in July 2016, and was said to be a return to the "traditional parade route". After an outcry from the public and a complaint to the Rhode Island Attorney General, the committee voted one week later to restore the longer route.

=== 2020-2022 parades ===
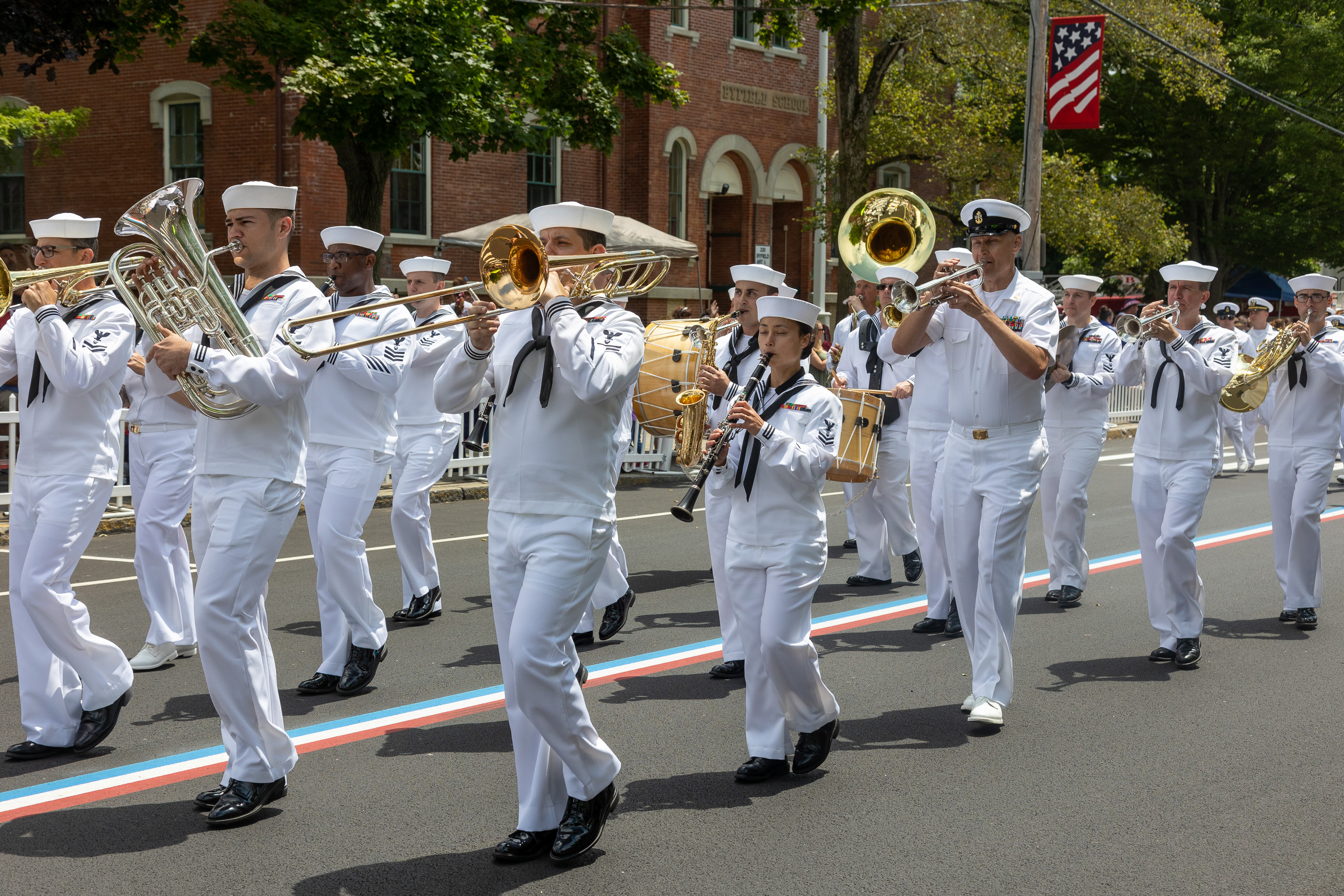
United States Navy Band Northeast at the 236th parade in 2021

The 2020 parade was held in a reduced format due to the 2020 coronavirus pandemic. Parade marchers wore masks and mostly rode automobiles, instead of walking on foot. Spectators consisted of small groups of dozens, rather than the usual throngs of thousands. The concert series and "Longest Traveled Award" were not held, as organizers wanted to keep the celebration local in scale. The parade returned with a "full slate of events" on Monday July 5, 2021 (as July 4 was a Sunday), though with fewer marching bands. The parade returned to "full strength" in 2022, after two years of pandemic-related scaling back.

== Celebration traditions ==
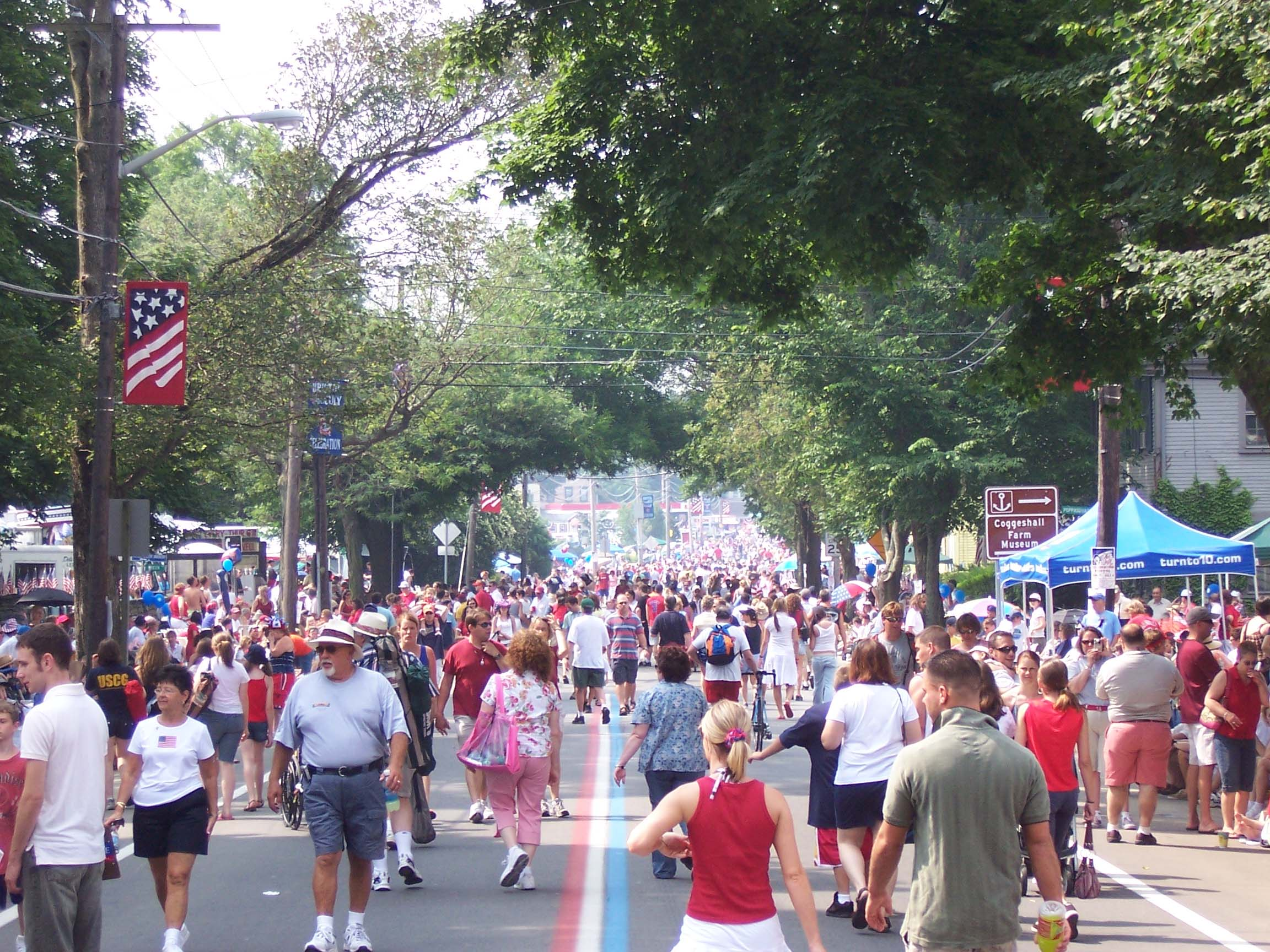
Crowded street scene prior to the parade in 2007. The town's unique red, white, and blue center line is also visible.

- Patriotic Exercises Speaker: the oldest tradition and given to a notable person chosen to speak (starting in 1785)
- Chief Marshal: a high honor given to a Bristol resident (starting in 1826)
- Hattie Brown Award: an award presented annually to a worthy Bristolian who demonstrates the same spirit of community service that was exhibited by the late Hattie Brown (starting in 1987)
- Visiting ship: a U.S. Navy ship is present at the celebration (starting in 1876)
- Drum and Bugle Corps from around the country
- Fourth of July Ball: a formal affair complete with cocktails, a grand march, dinner, and dancing
- Button Contest: Children in Bristol compete to design an official button for the parade. The winner is given a $100 bond and can march in the parade.
- Longest Traveled Award: given to the person who has traveled the longest distance to return to Bristol
- Pageants for Miss Fourth of July and Little Miss Fourth of July. By official parade rules, these are the only pageant winners allowed to participate in the parade; other pageant winners such as Miss Rhode Island are excluded. The rule is intended to "minimize any commercialization of the parade."

== See also ==
- Ancient and Horribles Parade
