= 10th Rhode Island Infantry Regiment =

- Active: May 26, 1862 to September 1, 1862
- Country: United States
- Allegiance: Union
- Branch: Infantry

Commanders
- Notable commanders: Colonel Zenas Bliss

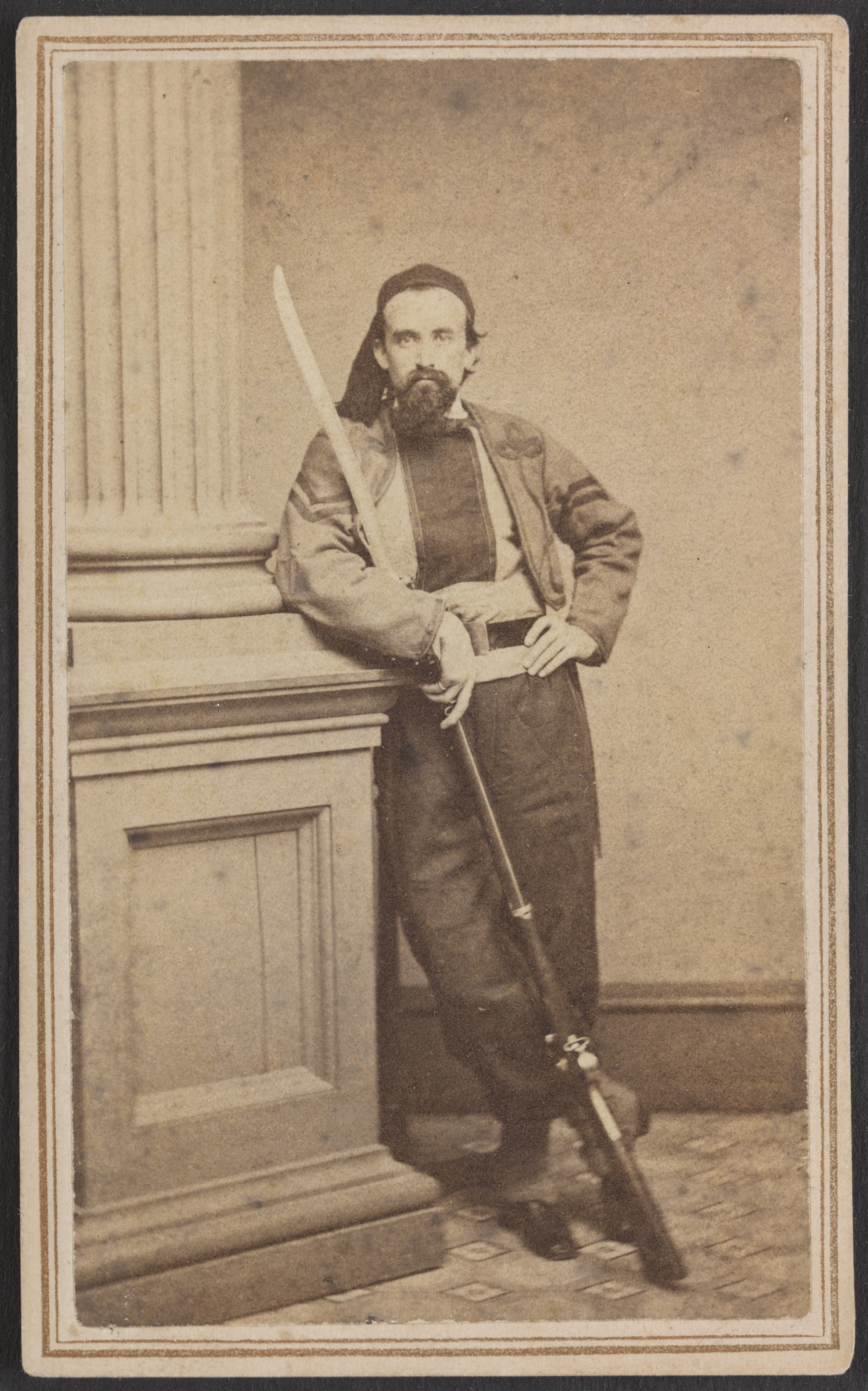
Sergeant Henry G. Lillibridge of Co. H, 10th Rhode Island Infantry Regiment. From the Liljenquist Family Collection of Civil War Photographs, Prints and Photographs Division, Library of Congress

The 10th Rhode Island Infantry Regiment served for three months in the summer of 1862. It served, along with its sister units—the 9th Rhode Island Infantry Regiment and the 10th Rhode Island Battery—in the defenses of Washington, D.C.

== Service ==
The regiment was mustered info Federal service at Providence on May 26, 1862. It moved to Washington, D. C. from May 27 to 29 and was attached to Sturgis' Command as part of the Military District of Washington. It saw duty at Camp Frieze, Tennallytown until June 26. With Sturgis, the regiment marched across the Potomac into Virginia, but returned to Washington when Jackson's threat to the city subsided.

After a few days, on Monday morning, June 30, the 10th was detached from Sturgis' troops and ordered to relieve the 59th New York in the seven forts and three batteries it had been occupying. These defenses of Washington were north and west of the city.

Company A was sent to Fort Franklin. This position guarded The Baltimore and Ohio Canal, the Baltimore & Ohio Railroad, the Washington Aqueduct, the new water supply for the city, and the adjacent Potomac River shoreline northwest of the city. U. S. Army Engineers had designed Franklin to protect the city's receiving reservoir (as conveyed by the Aqueduct) as well as the river shoreline. Nearby and guarding The Baltimore and Ohio Canal and the Baltimore & Ohio Railroad as they ran along the riverbank were companies E and I at Fort Alexander and F at Fort Ripley. These were also built with an eye to mutually support Franklin and Fort Marcy across the river in Virginia.

A critical line of communication into Washington was the Chain Bridge across the Potomac. Although it was a crossbeam truss structure that resembled a long garden arbor or pergola, it retained the historical name associated with the site. The Chain Bridge gave the U. S. Army access to the countryside encampments in Fairfax County and the countryside beyond via the Leesburg and Georgetown Turnpike and other roads fanning out from its Virginia side. A complex of small forts and batteries protected the bridge on the Maryland side, covering the Virginia shoreline between the Arlington line and Chain Bridge. They provided long-range coordinated fire with Fort Strong, C.F. Smith, Ethan Allen, and Marcy on the Virginia side and Fort Sumner on the Maryland side of the Potomac. The 10th garrisoned several of them.

Directly behind and 50 feet (15.24 m) above, in position to rake the bridge if necessary, were Battery Martin Scott and a pair of 12-pounder mountain howitzers in an unfortified position. A quarter mile to the north and in a supporting position was Battery Vermont, mounting three 32-pounder cannons. Company H was posted to these two batteries.

Located downriver and overlooking the aqueduct's distributing reservoir was Battery Cameron, mounting two 100-pounder Parrott guns. It was in a position to support the Chain Bridge defenses as well as Forts C. F. Smith, Strong. Morton, Woodbury, Corcoran, Haggerty and Bennett across the river. This position, garrisoned by Company C also had command of the Georgetown Bridge.

A quarter-mile inland from Battery Martin Scott was a reserve fort built to guard against a breakthrough by infantry past the forts along the river. This was Fort Gaines and was manned by the 10th's Company G. It had been built by the Pennsylvania Reserves during the prior summer.

Administrative and operational headquarters were at Camp Frieze in Tennallytown in the District of Columbia. Fort Pennsylvania, on the highest point of the northwest's defensive line, (Note: Cooling and Owen cite its elevation as 429 feet above mean sea level (MSL)) protected this nerve center and was manned by three companies of the 10th, B, K, and L.

The regiment's remaining company, D, was ordered to the defenses of the Rock Creek valley, due north of Georgetown and a half-mile east of Tennallytown. This company joined at the 4th New York Heavy Artillery in manning Fort DeRussy. (Note: Named after the 4th New York's commander. Col. Gustavus A. DeRussy.) This fort, the largest of four works in the network, commanded the Milkhouse Ford Road across Rock Creek. Controlling this ford protected the rear access to Fort Stevens, the headquarters for the northern defenses of the capital.

Although seeing no action beyond occasional skirmishes and musketry from Rebel pickets, the 10th did suffer from sickness during its deployment. It lost many men to stays in the various hospitals in the capital, but fortunately saw only three deaths as a result.

The regiment left their garrisons on Monday, August 25 to consolidate at Tennallytown. On Tuesday, they marched to Union Station and boarded trains heading north. Travelling on railways via Baltimore and Harrisburg, the 10th arrived at Elizabethport, N. J., on the Thursday morning, August 28. After a reception by local citizens, the regiment was dispersed to local armories until Friday morning the evening when it boarded the steamer, Bay State, and sailed from New York at 1:00 p.m. The steamer arrived in Narragansett Bay on Saturday, August 30. The regiment debarked in Providence on Sunday and mustered out at city hall on Monday, September 1, 1862.

== Company B ==
Company B of the 10th Regiment was made up of about 125 students from Brown University and Providence High School. Legend has it that Brown's President Sears consented to allow his students to enlist only on the condition that Gov. Dyer accompany them.

== Affiliations, battle honors, detailed service, and casualties ==
=== Organizational affiliation ===
Attached to:

- Attached to Sturgis' Command, Military District of Washington, till June 26.
- Assigned to Defenses of Washington to September 1862

=== Detailed service ===
- Organized at Providence May 26, 1862.
- Moved to Washington, D. C., May 27–29.
- Attached to Sturgis' Command, Military District of Washington.
- Duty at Camp Frize, Tennallytown, till June 26.
- Assigned to garrison duty in the Defences of Washington.
  - Company "A" at Fort Franklin (Note: Fort Franklin was built with Fort Alexander and Fort Ripley in 1861 to protect the Washington Aqueduct, the new water supply for the city, and the adjacent Potomac River shoreline. In 1863, these three earthwork forts were expanded and connected to form Fort Sumner.) 38.9554°N 77.1240°W
  - "B" and "K" at Fort Pennsylvania 38°57′10.2″N 77°04′41.9″W
  - "C" at Battery Cameron 38°54′56.3″N 77°05′19.7″W
  - "D" at Fort DeRussy 38.963056°N 77.051111°W
  - "E" and "I" at Fort Alexander (MD) (Note: Combined with Fort Franklin and Fort Ripley in 1863 to form Fort Sumner.)
  - "F" at Fort Ripley (Note: Combined with Fort Franklin and Fort Alexander in 1863 to form Fort Sumner.)
  - "G" at Fort Gaines 38°55′49.4″N 77°05′46.8″W
  - "H"' also known as the "Burnside Zouaves" at Battery Vermont 38°56′15.0″N 77°06′40.0″W and Battery Martin Scott 38°55′49.6″N 77°06′40.1″W
  - "L" near Fort Pennsylvania
- Left for home August 25
- Mustered out September 1, 1862

== Losses ==
Regiment lost 3 by disease.

== Notable Members ==
- Colonel (later Brig. Gen.) Zenas Bliss – Medal of Honor recipient for action at the Battle of Fredericksburg
- Nelson W. Aldrich, United States Senator for Rhode Island, 1881-1911
