= 7th Rhode Island Cavalry Squadron =

- Active: June 24, 1862, to September 26, 1862
- Country: United States
- Allegiance: Union
- Branch: Cavalry
- Type: Squadron
- Engagements: Battle of Harpers Ferry

The 7th Rhode Island Cavalry Squadron was a cavalry squadron that served in the Union Army during the American Civil War.

== Service ==
The 7th Rhode Island Cavalry Squadron was organized in Providence, Rhode Island and mustered in June 24, 1862, for three months' service. It consisted of two companies, Company A and Company B, under the command of Major Augustus W. Corliss.

The companies moved to Washington, D.C., June 28–30 and were attached to Military District of Washington, Wadsworth's Command, to July 1862. Sturgis' Command, Military District of Washington, to August 1862. Winchester, Virginia, to September 1862. Miles' Command, Harpers Ferry, West Virginia, September, 1862.

Served duty at Camp Clark and Camp Sprague, defenses of Washington, until July 25, 1862. Moved to Alexandria, Virginia, July 25, then to Winchester, Virginia, August 1. Served duty at Camp Sigel, Winchester, until September 3. Retreated to Newtown and Middleburg, then to Harpers Ferry, September 3–4. Maryland Heights September 12–13. Defense of Harpers Ferry September 13–15. Escaped through enemy's lines September 15 and participated in the capture of 100 wagons of Longstreet's supply train September 16.

The 7th Squadron, Rhode Island Cavalry mustered out September 26, 1862.

== Commanders ==
- Major Augustus Whittemore Corliss

== See also ==
- List of Rhode Island Civil War units
- Rhode Island in the American Civil War
