= Battery B, 1st Rhode Island Light Artillery Regiment =

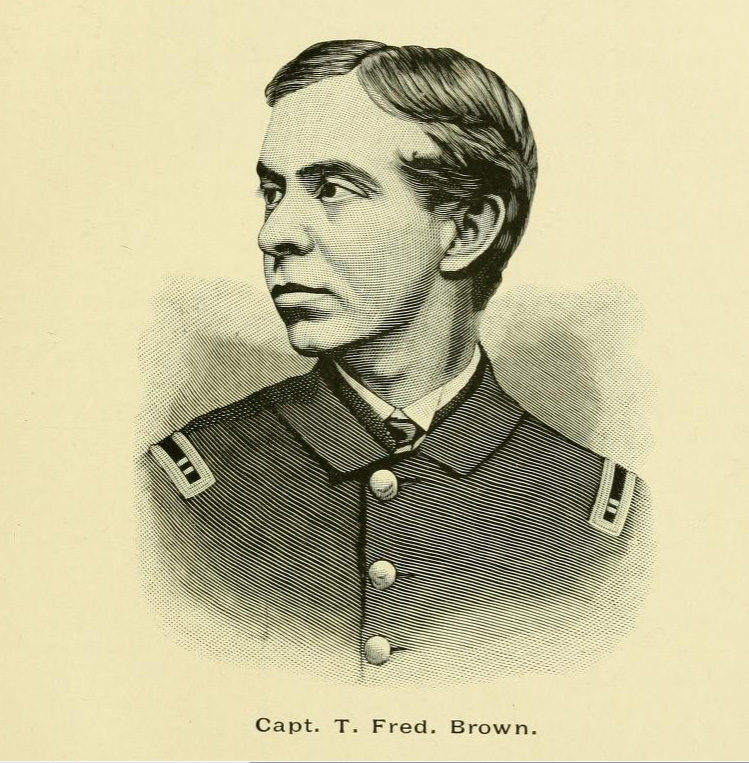
- Active: August 18, 1861 to June 13, 1865
- Country: United States
- Allegiance: Union
- Branch: Artillery
- Type: Battery
- Equipment: 6 12-pdr Napoleons
- Engagements: Battle of Ball's Bluff; Siege of Yorktown; Battle of Fair Oaks; Seven Days Battles; Battle of Savage's Station; Battle of Glendale; Battle of Malvern Hill; Battle of South Mountain; Battle of Antietam; Battle of Fredericksburg; Second Battle of Fredericksburg; Battle of Gettysburg; Bristoe Campaign; Mine Run Campaign; Battle of the Wilderness; Battle of Spotsylvania Court House; Battle of Totopotomoy Creek; Battle of Cold Harbor; Siege of Petersburg; Battle of Jerusalem Plank Road; First Battle of Deep Bottom; Second Battle of Deep Bottom; Second Battle of Ream's Station; Appomattox Campaign; Third Battle of Petersburg; Battle of Sayler's Creek; Battle of High Bridge; Battle of Appomattox Court House

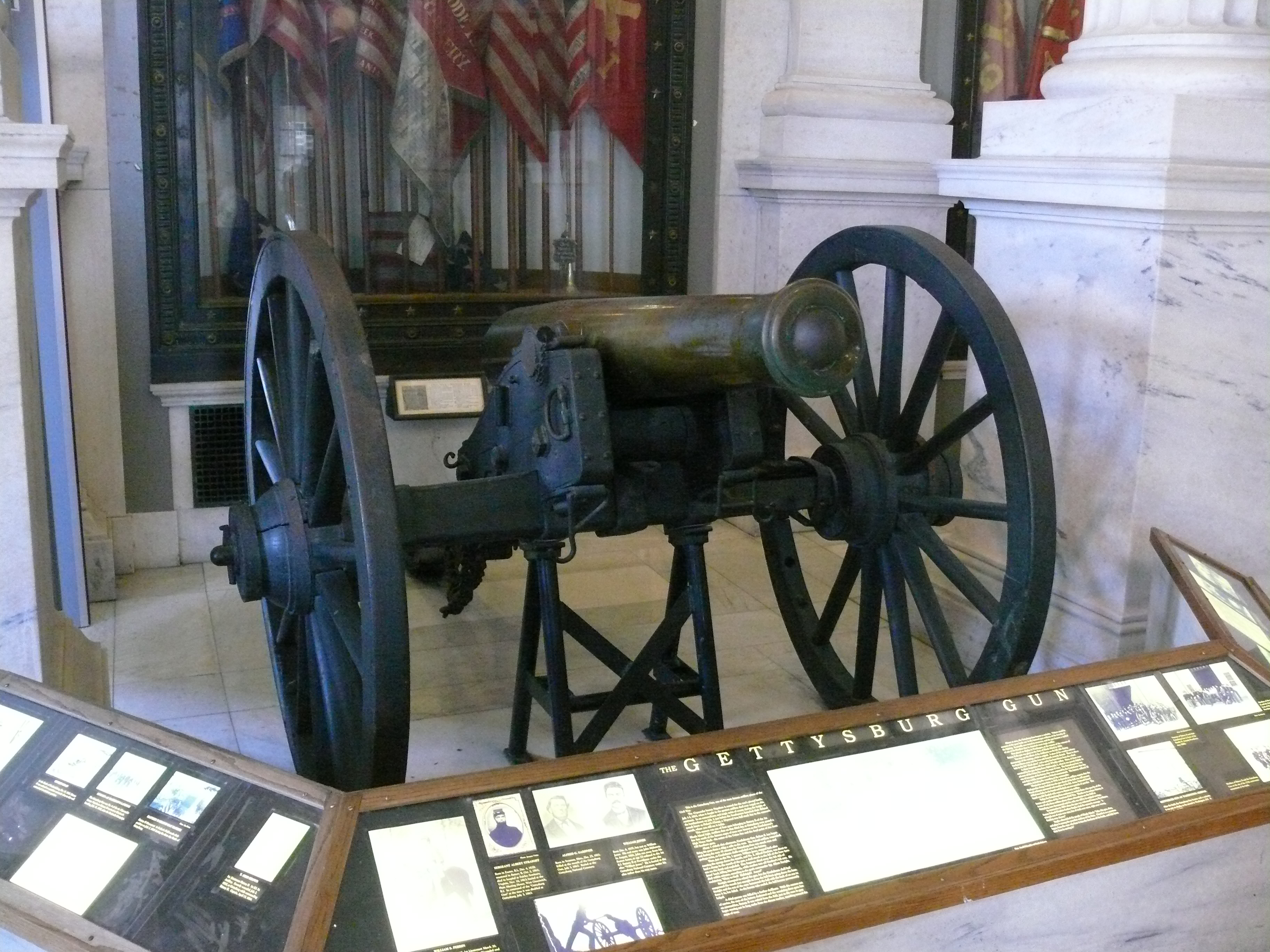
The Gettysburg Gun at the Rhode Island State House

Battery B, 1st Rhode Island Light Artillery Regiment was an artillery battery that served in the Union Army during the American Civil War.

== Service ==
Battery B, 1st Rhode Island Light Artillery Regiment was organized in Providence, Rhode Island and mustered in for a three-year enlistment on August 18, 1861, under the command of Captain Thomas F. Vaughan.

The battery was attached to Stone's Brigade, Division of the Potomac, to October 1861. Artillery, Stone's (Sedgwick's) Division, Army of the Potomac, to March 1862. Artillery, 2nd Division, II Corps, Army of the Potomac, to June 1863. Artillery Brigade, II Corps, to June 1865. It mustered out of service on June 13, 1865.

== Detailed service ==
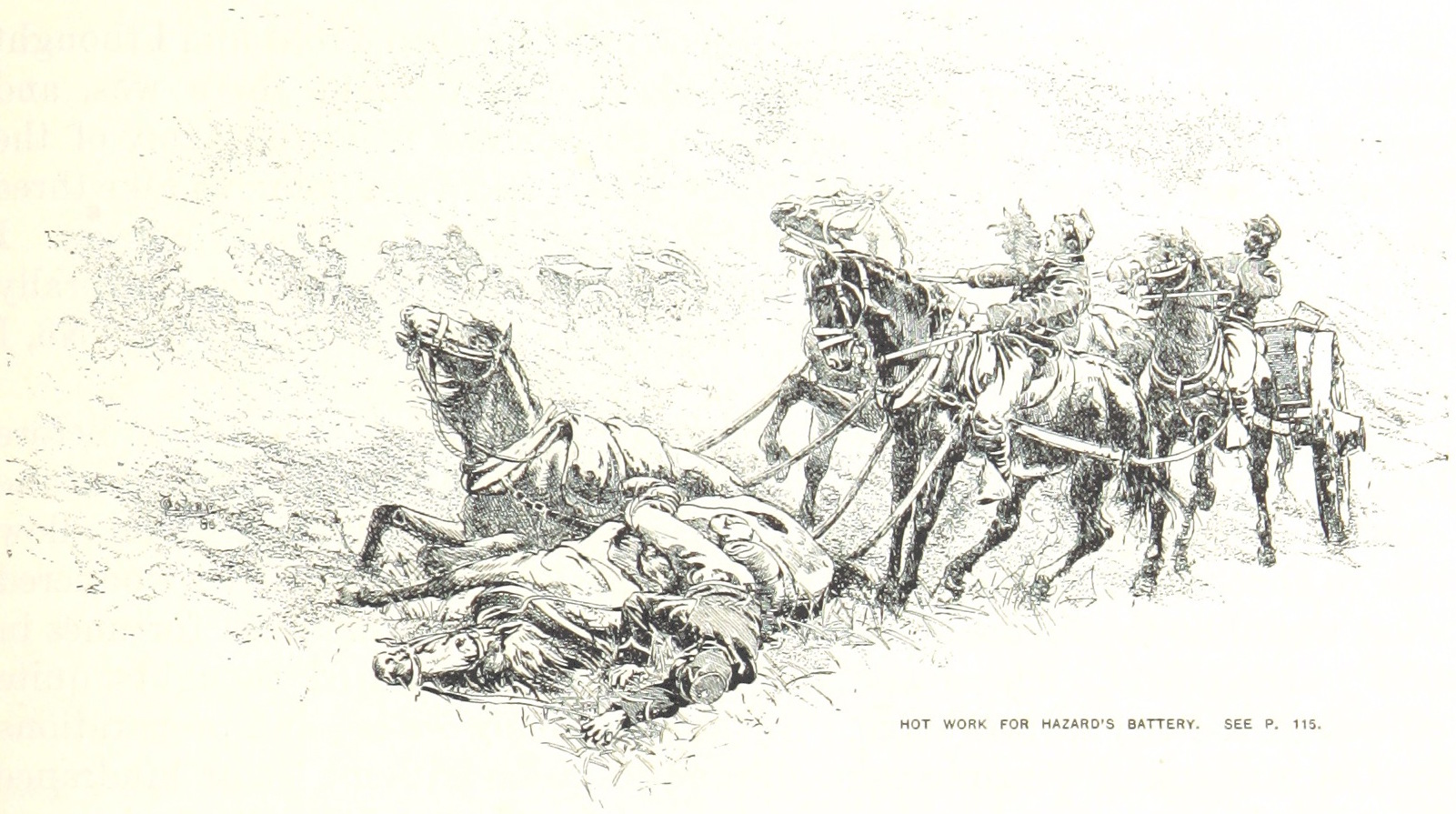
Battery B comes under fire at the Battle of Fredericksburg

- Left Rhode Island for Washington, D.C., August 23.
- Duty at Camp Stone and along Upper Potomac until February, 1862.
- Operations on the Potomac October 21–24, 1861.
- Battle of Ball's Bluff October 21.
- March to Harpers Ferry, West Virginia, February 25–26, 1862, and duty there until March 7.
- Moved to Charlestown, thence to Berryville March 7–10.
- Advance toward Winchester March 13–14.
- Return to Harpers Ferry, then moved to Washington, D.C., and Hampton, Virginia, March 22 – April 1.
- Siege of Yorktown April 5 – May 4.
- Battle of Fair Oaks (Seven Pines) May 31 – June 1.
- Seven days before Richmond June 25 – July 1.
- Peach Orchard and Savage Station June 29.
- Charles City Cross Roads and Glendale June 30.
- Malvern Hill July 1.
- At Harrison's Landing until August 16.
- Movement to Fortress Monroe, then to Alexandria and Fairfax Court House August 16–31.
- Cover retreat of Pope's Army from Bull Run to Washington August 31 – September 2.
- Maryland Campaign September.
- Battles of South Mountain September 14, and Antietam September 16–17.
- Moved to Harpers Ferry September 22, and duty there until October 30.
- Reconnaissance to Charlestown October 16–17.
- Advance up Loudoun Valley and movement to Falmouth, Virginia, October 30 – November 17.
- Battle of Fredericksburg December 11–15.
- Duty at Falmouth until April 27, 1863.
- Chancellorsville Campaign April 27 – May 6.
- Maryes Heights, Fredericksburg, May 3.
- Salem Heights May 3–4.
- Banks' Ford May 4.
- Gettysburg Campaign June 11 – July 24.
- Battle of Gettysburg July 1–4.
- Advance from the Rappahannock to the Rapidan September 13–17.
- Bristoe Campaign October 9–22.
- Auburn and Bristoe October 14.
- Advance to line of the Rappahannock November 7–8.
- Mine Run Campaign November 26 – December 2.
- At Stevensburg, Virginia, until May 1864.
- Demonstration on the Rapidan February 6–7.
- Campaign from the Rapidan to the James May – June.
- Battles of the Wilderness May 5–7; Spotsylvania May 8–12; Spotsylvania Court House May 12–21.
- Assault on the Salient May 12.
- North Anna River May 23–26.
- Line of the Pamunkey May 26–28.
- Totopotomoy May 28–31.
- Cold Harbor June 1–12.
- Before Petersburg June 16–18.
- Siege of Petersburg June 16, 1864 to April 2, 1865.
- Jerusalem Plank Road June 22–23, 1864.
- Deep Bottom July 27–28.
- Strawberry Plains, Deep Bottom, August 14–18.
- Ream's Station August 25.
- Hatcher's Run October 27–28.
- Dabney's Mills February 5–7, 1865.
- Appomattox Campaign March 28 – April 9.
- Fall of Petersburg April 2.
- Sayler's Creek April 6.
- High Bridge and Farmville April 7.
- Appomattox Court House April 9.
- Surrender of Lee and his army.
- Moved to Washington, D.C., May 2–15.
- Grand Review of the Armies May 23.

== Casualties ==
One officer and 13 enlisted killed in action. 15 enlisted died from disease.

== Commanders ==
- Captain Thomas F. Vaughan
- Captain Walter O. Bartlett
- Captain John G. Hazard - commanded at the battles of Antietam and Fredericksburg
- Captain Thomas Frederick Brown - wounded in action at Gettysburg, July 2, 1863
- Lieutenant William S. Perrin - commanded at Gettysburg after Capt. Brown was wounded

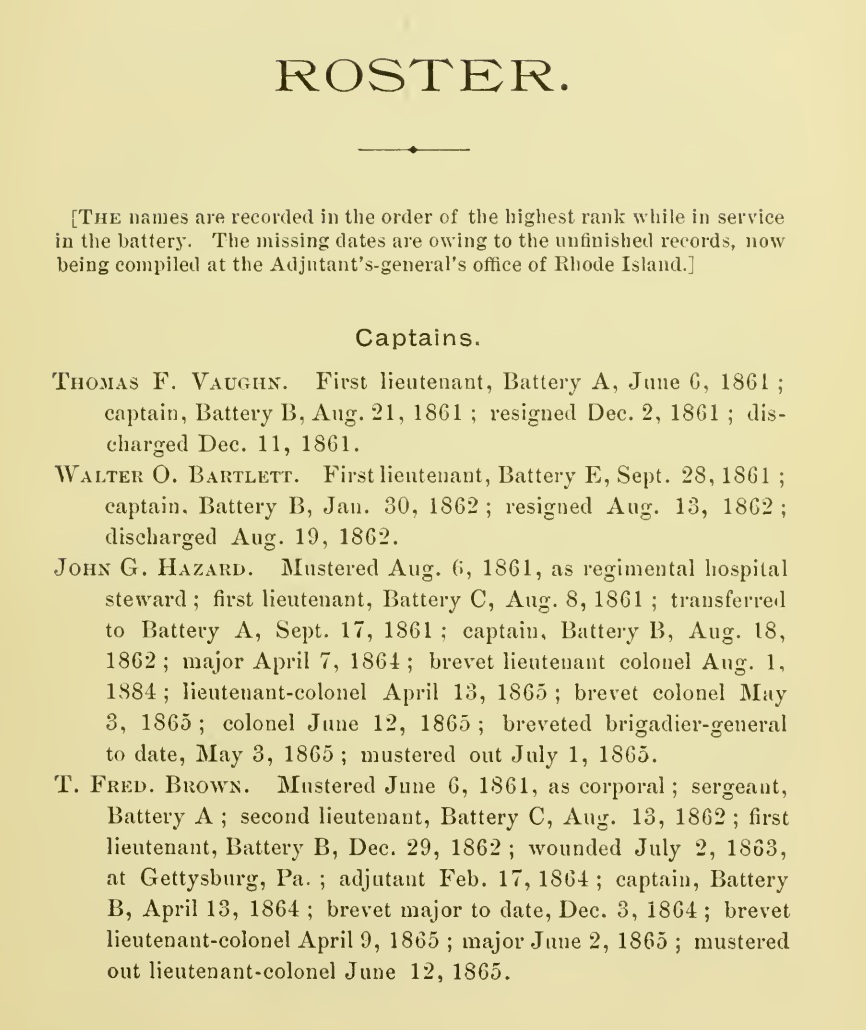

== See also ==
- List of Rhode Island Civil War units
- Rhode Island in the American Civil War
