= Battery F, 1st Rhode Island Light Artillery Regiment =

- Active: October 29, 1861 to June 27, 1865
- Country: United States
- Allegiance: Union
- Branch: Artillery
- Equipment: 2 12-pdr Howitzers, 4 10-pdr Parrott rifles
- Engagements: Battle of Roanoke Island; Battle of New Bern; Battle of Fort Macon (detachment); Bermuda Hundred Campaign; Battle of Drewry's Bluff; Siege of Petersburg; Battle of Chaffin's Farm

Battery F, 1st Rhode Island Light Artillery Regiment was an artillery battery that served in the Union Army during the American Civil War. The battery briefly served as cavalry, March 20 to May 18, 1862.

== Service ==
Battery F, 1st Rhode Island Light Artillery Regiment was organized at Camp Perry in Cranston, Rhode Island and mustered in for a three-year enlistment on October 29, 1861 under the command of Captain Miles G. Moies.

The battery first served unattached, Department of North Carolina, to December 1862. Artillery Brigade, Department of North Carolina, to January 1863. Artillery Brigade, XVIII Corps, Department of North Carolina, to May 1863. Defenses of New Bern, North Carolina, to November 1863. District of St. Marys, Department of Virginia and North Carolina, to January 1864. U.S. Forces, Yorktown, Virginia, Department of Virginia and North Carolina, to April 1864. Artillery, 2nd Division, XVIII Corps, Department of Virginia and North Carolina, to June 1864. Artillery Brigade, XVIII Corps, to December 1864. Artillery Brigade, XXIV Corps, Department of Virginia, to June 1865.

Battery F, 1st Rhode Island Light Artillery mustered out of service on June 27, 1865.

== Detailed service ==
Left Rhode Island for Washington, D.C., November 7. Duty at Camp Sprague and at Camp California, near Alexandria, defenses of Washington, until January 1862. Moved to Annapolis, Md, Attached to Burnside's Expeditionary Corps to April 1862. Burnside's Expedition to Hatteras Inlet and Roanoke Island, N.C., January 9-February 7, 1862. At Hatteras Inlet until February 26, and at Roanoke Island until March 11. Moved to New Berne, N.C., March 11–14, and duty there until October 1863. Picket and outpost duty as cavalry March 20 to May 18, 1862. Action at Deep Gully March 31. Trent Road April 19. Expedition to Trenton and Pollocksville July 24–28. Expedition to Little Washington October 29–30. Expedition from New Berne November 2–12. Action at Rawle's Mills November 2. Demonstration on New Berne November 11. Foster's Expedition to Goldsboro December 11–20. Kinston December 14. Whitehall December 16. Goldsboro December 17. Expedition for relief of Little Washington April 7–10, 1863. Action at Blount's Creek April 9. Expedition to Swift Creek Village April 13–21 (section). Expedition to Washington April 17–19. Expedition to Trenton July 4–8. Actions at Free Bridge and Quaker Bridge July 6. Expedition to Winston July 25–26. Pattacassy Creek, Mt. Tabor Church, July 26. Expedition to Elizabeth City October 10–16. Moved to Norfolk, Va., October 30-November 5, then to Point Lookout, Md., November 23–24, and duty there until January 1864. Moved to Yorktown, Va., January 24. Wistar's Expedition toward Richmond February 6–8. Ball's Cross Roads February 7. Bottom's Bridge February 7. Expedition from Yorktown to New Kent Court House in support of Kilpatrick's Cavalry March 1–4. Expedition into King and Queen County March 9–12. Butler's operations on the south side of the James River and against Petersburg and Richmond May 4–28. Swift Creek or Arrow field Church May 9–10. Operations against Fort Darling May 12–16. Battle of Drewry's Bluff May 14–16. On Bermuda Hundred line May 16-June 15. Before Petersburg June 15–18. Siege operations against Petersburg and Richmond June 16, 1864 to April 2, 1865. Battle of Chaffin's Farm September 28–30, 1864. Duty at Aiken's Landing October 7-November 8, 1864, and at Chaffin's Farm before Richmond until April 7, 1865. Moved to Richmond April 7, and duty there until June 25.

== Casualties ==
The battery lost a total of 27 men during service; 10 enlisted men killed or mortally wounded, 17 enlisted men died of disease.

== Commanders ==
- Captain Miles G. Moies - resigned November 12, 1862
- Captain James Belger - captured at the battle of Drewry's Bluff
- Captain Thomas Simpson - commanded detachment at the siege of Fort Macon as lieutenant

== See also ==
- List of Rhode Island Civil War units
- Rhode Island in the American Civil War
