= Battery H, 1st Rhode Island Light Artillery Regiment =

- Active: October 14, 1862 to July 3, 1865
- Country: United States
- Allegiance: Union
- Branch: Artillery
- Engagements: Battle of the Wilderness; Battle of Spotsylvania Court House; Siege of Petersburg; Appomattox Campaign; Third Battle of Petersburg; Battle of Sayler's Creek; Battle of High Bridge; Battle of Appomattox Court House

Battery H, 1st Rhode Island Light Artillery Regiment was an artillery battery that served in the Union Army during the American Civil War.

== Service ==
Battery H, 1st Rhode Island Light Artillery Regiment was organized in Providence, Rhode Island and mustered in October 14, 1862 for a three year enlistment under the command of Captain Crawford Allen, Jr..

The battery was attached to Camp Barry, Military District of Washington, October 1862. Stannard's 2nd Brigade, Casey's Division, Military District Washington, to February 1863. Artillery, Casey's Division, XXII Corps, Department of Washington, to April 1863. Artillery, Abercrombie's Division, XXII Corps, to May 1863. 3rd Brigade, DeRussy's Division, XXII Corps, to November 1863. Camp Barry, XXII Corps, to April 1864. Artillery, 1st Division, IX Corps, Army of the Potomac, to May 1864. Reserve Artillery, IX Corps, to June 1864. 2nd Brigade, DeRussy's Division, XXII Corps, to July 1864. 1st Brigade, DeRussy's Division, XXII Corps, to October 1864. City Point, Virginia, Department of Virginia and North Carolina, to December 1864. Artillery Reserve, Army of the Potomac, to January 1865. Artillery Brigade, VI Corps, to June 1865.

Battery H, 1st Rhode Island Light Artillery mustered out of service at Providence, Rhode Island on June 28, 1865 and was discharged July 3, 1865.

== Detailed service ==
Left Rhode Island for Washington, D.C., October 23. Duty at Camp Barry, Washington, D.C., until January 1863. Moved to Fairfax Station January 19–23, and duty there until March 23. Moved to Union Mills March 23, and duty there until May 20. Moved to Chantilly, Va., May 20, and duty there until June 25. Moved to Fairfax Court House June 25, then to Arlington Heights, and duty in the defenses of Washington, south of the Potomac, until April 1864. Rapidan Campaign May 3–10. Battle of the Wilderness May 5–7. Spotsylvania May 8–10. March to Fredericksburg, then to Aquia Creek May 10–18, then moved to Washington. Duty at Fort Richardson until July 10, and at Fort Smith until October 16. At Camp Barry until October 25. Moved to City Point, Va., October 25–26, and duty there until January 2, 1865. Ordered to join the Army of the Potomac January 2. Siege of Petersburg January 2-April 2. Fort Fisher, Petersburg, March 25. Appomattox Campaign March 28-April 9. Assault on and fall of Petersburg April 2. Sayler's Creek April 6. High Bridge and Farmville April 7. Appomattox Court House April 9. Surrender of Lee and his army. March to Danville April 23–27, then to Burkesville Station May 3–6. Moved to Washington, D.C., via City Point and Richmond May 20-June 7. Corps Review June 8. Ordered to Providence, R.I., June 13.

== Casualties ==
The battery lost a total of 12 men during service; 2 enlisted men killed or mortally wounded, 10 enlisted men died of disease.

== Commanders ==
- Captain Crawford Allen, Jr.

== See also ==
- List of Rhode Island Civil War units
- Rhode Island in the American Civil War
