= Battery D, 1st Rhode Island Light Artillery Regiment =

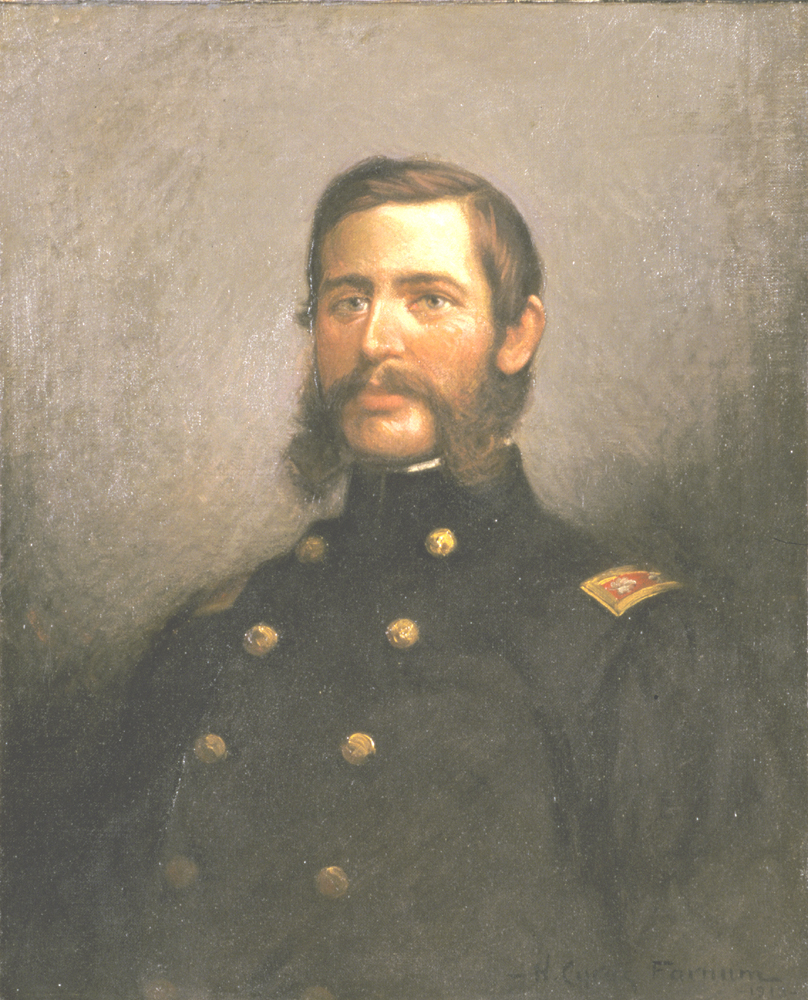
- John Albert Monroe, painted by Herbert Cyrus Farnum
- Active: September 4, 1861 to July 17, 1865
- Country: United States
- Allegiance: Union
- Branch: Artillery
- Size: Company
- Engagements: Battle of Groveton; Second Battle of Bull Run; Battle of Chantilly; Battle of Antietam; Battle of Fredericksburg; Knoxville Campaign; Battle of the Wilderness; Third Battle of Winchester; Battle of Fisher's Hill; Battle of Cedar Creek

Battery D, 1st Rhode Island Light Artillery Regiment was an artillery battery that served in the Union Army during the American Civil War.

== Service ==
Battery D, 1st Rhode Island Light Artillery Regiment was organized in Providence, Rhode Island and mustered in for a three-year enlistment on September 4, 1861, under the command of Captain John Albert Monroe.

The battery was attached to McDowell's Division, Army of the Potomac, to March 1862. Artillery, 1st Division, I Corps, Army of the Potomac, to April 1862. Artillery, 3rd Division, Department of the Rappahannock, to June 1862. Artillery, 3rd Division, III Corps, Army of Virginia, to September 1862. Artillery, 1st Division, I Corps, Army of the Potomac, to October 1862. Artillery, 1st Division, IX Corps, Army Potomac, to March 1863. Artillery, 2nd Division, IX Corps, Department of the Ohio, to June 1863. Unassigned, 1st Division, XXIII Corps, Department of the Ohio, to August 1863. Artillery Reserve, XXIII Corps, Department of the Ohio, to October 1863. Artillery. 1st Division, IX Corps, Department of the Ohio, to April 1864. Reserve Artillery, IX Corps, Army of the Potomac, to June 1864. 1st Brigade, Haskins' Division, XXII Corps, Department of Washington, to August 1864. Reserve Artillery, XIX Corps, Army of the Shenandoah, Middle Military Division, to December 1864. Artillery Brigade, XIX Corps, Army of the Shenandoah, to March 1865. Artillery Reserve, Army of the Shenandoah, to July 1865.

Battery D, 1st Rhode Island Light Artillery mustered out of service on July 17, 1865.

== Detailed service ==
Left Rhode Island for Washington, D.C., September 14. Duty at Upton's Hill, Va., defenses of Washington, until March 9, 1862. March to Fairfax Court House March 9–16, then to Bristoe March 29, then to Falmouth. Duty at Falmouth and Fredericksburg until June. McDowell's advance on Richmond May 25–29. Pursuit of Jackson June 2–11. Reconnaissance to Orange Court House July 24–27. Expedition to Virginia Central Railroad August 5–8. Action at Thornburg's Mill or Massaponax Church August 5–6. Pope's Campaign in northern Virginia August 16-September 2. Battles of Gainesville August 28; Groveton August 29; Bull Run August 30; Chantilly September 1; Antietam, Md., September 16–17. Movement to Falmouth, Va., October 30-November 19. Battle of Fredericksburg, Va., December 12–15. "Mud March" January 20–24, 1863. At Falmouth until February 19. Moved to Newport News February 19, then to Covington, Ky., March 19–29, and to Lexington, Ky. Moved to Camp Nelson, Ky., May 8, and to Cincinnati, Ohio, July 12. To Camp Nelson August 15. Burnside's Campaign in eastern Tennessee August 16-October 17. March over Cumberland Mountains to Loudon, Tenn., August 16-September 4. March to Blue Springs October 7–10. Action at Blue Springs October 10. March to Knoxville, Tenn., October 13–17, then to Loudon October 20–22, and to Lenoir Station October 28. Knoxville Campaign November 4-December 23. Campbell's Station November 16. Siege of Knoxville November 17-December 4. Repulse of Longstreet's assault on Fort Saunders November 29. Pursuit to Rutledge December 5–14. Operations in eastern Tennessee until March 20, 1864. Veterans on furlough February and March. Movement to Washington, D.C., March 20-April 7. Campaign from the Rapidan to the James May. Battles of the Wilderness May 5–7. Garrison duty at Fort Lincoln, defenses of Washington, D.C., until July. Sheridan's Shenandoah Valley Campaign August to December. Battle of Opequan, Winchester, September 19. Strasburg September 21. Fisher's Hill September 22. Battle of Cedar Creek October 19. Duty in the Shenandoah Valley to July 1865.

== Casualties ==
The battery lost a total of 22 men during service; 10 enlisted men killed or mortally wounded, 12 enlisted men died of disease.

== Commanders ==
- Captain John Albert Monroe
- Captain William W. Buckley
- Lieutenant Frederic Chase - commanded at the Third Battle of Winchester

== See also ==
- List of Rhode Island Civil War units
- Rhode Island in the American Civil War
