= Battery E, 1st Rhode Island Light Artillery Regiment =

- Active: September 23, 1861 to June 11, 1865
- Country: United States
- Allegiance: Union
- Branch: Artillery
- Equipment: 6 12-pdr Napoleons
- Engagements: Peninsula Campaign; Siege of Yorktown; Battle of Williamsburg; Battle of Fair Oaks; Seven Days Battles; Battle of Gaines' Mill; Battle of Savage's Station; Battle of Glendale; Battle of Malvern Hill; Battle of Groveton; Second Battle of Bull Run; Battle of Chantilly; Battle of Fredericksburg; Battle of Chancellorsville; Battle of Gettysburg; Bristoe Campaign; Mine Run Campaign; Battle of the Wilderness; Battle of Spotsylvania Court House; Battle of Totopotomoy Creek; Battle of Cold Harbor; Siege of Petersburg; Battle of Jerusalem Plank Road; Third Battle of Petersburg

Battery E, 1st Rhode Island Light Artillery Regiment was an artillery battery that served in the Union Army during the American Civil War.

== Service ==
Battery E, 1st Rhode Island Light Artillery Regiment was organized in Providence, Rhode Island and mustered in for a three-year enlistment on September 23, 1861, under the command of Captain George E. Randolph.

The battery was attached to Heintzelman's Division, Army of the Potomac, to March, 1862. Artillery, 3rd Division, III Corps, Army of the Potomac, to August 1862. Artillery, 1st Division, III Corps, Army of the Potomac, to June 1863. Artillery Brigade, III Corps, to March 1864. Artillery Brigade, VI Corps, to July 1864. Artillery Reserve, Army of the Potomac, to December 1864. Artillery Brigade, VI Corps, to April 1865. Artillery Reserve, Army of the Potomac, to June 1865.

Battery E, 1st Rhode Island Light Artillery mustered out of service on June 11, 1865.

== Detailed service ==
Left Rhode Island for Washington, D.C., October 4. Duty at Camp Sprague until November 5, 1861, and at Fort Lyon, near Alexandria, Va., defenses of Washington, until April 1862. Peninsula Campaign April to August. Siege of Yorktown April 5-May 4. Warwick Road April 15. Battle of Williamsburg May 5. Battle of Fair Oaks May 31-June 1. Seven days before Richmond June 25-June 1. Oak Grove, near Seven Pines, June 25. Jordan's Ford June 27. Peach Orchard and Savage Station June 29. Brackett's June 30. Charles City Cross Roads and Glendale June 30. Malvern Hill July 1. At Harrison's Landing until August 15. Movement to Centreville August 15–26. Bristoe Station August 27. Groveton August 29. Battle of Bull Run August 30. Chantilly September 1. Duty in the defenses of Washington until October 11. March up the Potomac to Leesburg, thence to Falmouth, Va., October 11-November 23. Battle of Fredericksburg December 12–15. "Mud March" January 20–24, 1863. At Falmouth until April 27. Chancellorsville Campaign April 27-May 6. Battle of Chancellorsville May 1–5. Battle of Gettysburg, July 1–4. Wapping Heights, Va., July 23. Bristoe Campaign October 9–22. Advance to line of the Rappahannock November 7–8. Kelly's Ford November 7. Mine Run Campaign November 26-December 2. Payne's Farm November 27. Rapidan Campaign May–June, 1864. Battles of the Wilderness May 5–7; Spotsylvania May 8–12; Spotsylvania Court House May 12–21; North Anna River May 23–26. Line of the Pamunkey May 26–28. Totopotomoy May 28–31. Cold Harbor June 1–12. Bethesda Church June 1–3. Before Petersburg June 18–22. Jerusalem Plank Road June 22–23. Moved to Baltimore, Md, July 9–16, then back to City Point, Va., July 17–19. Operations against Petersburg and Richmond July 1864 to April 1865. Fall of Petersburg April 2. Ordered to City Point April 3.

== Casualties ==
The battery lost a total of 29 men during service; 17 enlisted men killed or mortally wounded, 12 enlisted men died of disease.

== Commanders ==
- Captain George E. Randolph
- Captain William B. Rhodes
- Lieutenant Pardon S. Jastrum - commanded at the battles of Fredericksburg and Chancellorsville

== Notable Members ==
- First Lieutenant John K. Bucklyn – Medal of Honor recipient for action at the Battle of Chancellorsville on May 3, 1863

== See also ==
- List of Rhode Island Civil War units
- Rhode Island in the American Civil War
