= 2nd Rhode Island Cavalry Regiment =

Cavalry regiment of the Union Army in the American Civil War

- Active: November 21, 1862, to January 14, 1864
- Country: United States
- Allegiance: Union
- Branch: Cavalry
- Type: Regiment
- Engagements: Siege of Port Hudson

The 2nd Rhode Island Cavalry Regiment was a cavalry regiment of the Union Army in the American Civil War.

== Service ==
The 2nd Rhode Island Cavalry Regiment was organized in Providence, Rhode Island and mustered into service on November 21, 1862, for a three-year enlistment, though it never reached full strength.

The regiment was attached to 1st Division, XIX Corps, Department of the Gulf, to July 1863. Cavalry Brigade, XIX Corps, until August 1863.

Ordered to New Orleans, Louisiana, and served duty there until March 1863. Moved to Baton Rouge, Louisiana, March 6–7, 1863. The regiment participated in the operations against Port Hudson, March 7–27. The regiment moved to Algiers, then proceeded to Berwick April 1–9. Operations in western Louisiana April 9-May 14. Teche Campaign April 11–20. Franklin April 14. Near Washington May 1. Expedition from Opelousas to Alexandria and Simsport May 5–18. Operations about Monett's Plantation and on Bayou Sara Road May 18–19. Moved to Bayou Sara, then to Port Hudson May 22–25. Siege of Port Hudson May 25-July 9. Jackson Cross Roads June 20. Springfield Landing July 2. Surrender of Port Hudson July 9.

The regiment was consolidated into a battalion of four companies August 24, 1863, and attached to the 1st Louisiana Cavalry. It served thus at Camp Hubbard, Thibodeaux, August 29–30 and then ceased to exist on January 14, 1864, when its members were transferred to the 3rd Rhode Island Cavalry.

== Casualties ==
The regiment lost a total of 35 enlisted men during service; 4 enlisted men killed or mortally wounded, 31 enlisted men died of disease.

== Commanders ==
- Lieutenant Colonel Augustus W. Corliss

== See also ==
- List of Rhode Island Civil War units
- Rhode Island in the American Civil War
