= Battery C, 1st Rhode Island Light Artillery Regiment =

- Active: August 25, 1861 to December 23, 1864
- Country: United States
- Allegiance: Union
- Branch: Artillery
- Type: Battery
- Engagements: Siege of Yorktown; Battle of Williamsburg; Battle of Hanover Court House; Seven Days Battles; Battle of Mechanicsville; Battle of Gaines' Mill; Battle of Malvern Hill; Second Battle of Bull Run; Battle of Antietam; Battle of Fredericksburg; Battle of Chancellorsville; Battle of Gettysburg; Bristoe Campaign; Mine Run Campaign; Battle of the Wilderness; Battle of Spotsylvania Court House; Battle of Totopotomoy Creek; Battle of Cold Harbor; Siege of Petersburg; Battle of Jerusalem Plank Road; Battle of Fort Stevens; Battle of Opequon; Battle of Fisher's Hill; Battle of Cedar Creek

Battery C, 1st Rhode Island Light Artillery Regiment was an artillery battery that served in the Union Army during the American Civil War.

== Service ==
Battery C, 1st Rhode Island Light Artillery Regiment was organized in Providence, Rhode Island and mustered in for a three year enlistment on August 25, 1861 under the command of Captain William B. Weeden.

The battery was attached to:

- Porter's Division, Army of the Potomac, to March 1862.
- Artillery, 1st Division, III Corps, Army of the Potomac, to May 1862.
- Artillery, 1st Division, V Corps, Army Potomac, to May 1863.
- 3rd Volunteer Brigade, Artillery Reserve, Army of the Potomac, to June 1863.
- Artillery Brigade, VI Corps, Army of the Potomac, to August 1864, and
- Army of the Shenandoah to November 1864.
- Camp Barry, XXII Corps, Department of Washington, to December 1864.

Battery C, 1st Rhode Island Light Artillery ceased to exist on December 23, 1864 when it was consolidated with Battery G, 1st Rhode Island Light Artillery.

== Detailed service ==
- Left Rhode Island for Washington, D.C., August 31.
- Duty at Camp Sprague, defenses of Washington, until October 1861, and at Hall's and Munson's Hills until March 1862.
- Advance on Manassas, Va., March 10–16.
- Moved to Alexandria, then to Fort Monroe, Va., March 16–23.
- Action at Howard's Bridge April 4. Siege of Yorktown April 5-May 4.
- Battle of Williamsburg May 5. Hanover Court House May 27.
- Operations about Hanover Court House May 27–29.
- Seven days before Richmond June 25-July 1.
- Battles of Mechanicsville June 26; Gaines' Mill June 27;
- Turkey Bridge and Malvern Cliff June 30; Malvern Hill July 1.
- At Harrison's Landing until August 16.
- Movement to Fortress Monroe, thence to Centreville August 16–28.
- Battle of Bull Run August 30.
- Battle of Antietam, September 16–17.
- Shepherds Town September 19.
- At Sharpsburg until October 30.
- Movement to Falmouth, Va., October 30-November 19.
- Battle of Fredericksburg, Va., December 12–15.
- "Mud March" January 20–24, 1863. At Falmouth, Va., until April 27.
- Chancellorsville Campaign April 27-May 6.
- Battle of Chancellorsville May 1–5.
- Operations at Franklin's Crossing June 5–13. Battle of Gettysburg, July 2–4.
- At Warrenton, Va., until September 15. Bristoe Campaign October 9–22.
- Advance to line of the Rappahannock November 7–8. Rappahannock Station November 7.
- Mine Run Campaign November 26-December 2.
- At Brandy Station until May 1864. Campaign from the Rapidan to the James May–June.
- Battles of the Wilderness May 5–7; Spotsylvania May 8–12: Spotsylvania Court House May 12–21;
- North Anna River May 23–26.
- Line of the Pamunkey May 26–28. Totopotomoy May 28–31.
- Cold Harbor June 1–12.
- Before Petersburg June 16–18.
- Siege of Petersburg June 16-July 9.
- Jerusalem Plank Road June 22–23.
- Moved to Washington, D.C., June 9–11.
- Repulse of Early's attack on Washington July 11–12.
- Sheridan's Shenandoah Valley Campaign August to November.
- Battle of Opequon, Winchester, September 19.
- Fisher's Hill September 22.
- Battle of Cedar Creek October 19.
- Duty at Winchester and Kernstown until November, and at Camp Barry, defenses of Washington, until December.

== Casualties ==
The battery lost a total of 27 men during service; 19 enlisted men killed or mortally wounded, 8 enlisted men died of disease.

== Commanders ==
- Captain William B. Weeden
- Captain Richard Waterman
- Lieutenant Jacob H. Lamb - commanded at the battle of Opequon

== See also ==
- List of Rhode Island Civil War units
- Rhode Island in the American Civil War
