= 169th Military Police Company =

The 169th Military Police Company is an independent company of military police of the Rhode Island National Guard. It is a subordinate unit of the 118th Military Police Battalion and the 43rd Military Police Brigade. It is the oldest unit of the Rhode Island Army National Guard, one of the oldest units in the United States Army, and is one of several National Guard units with colonial origins.

== History ==
=== Predecessor units ===
The 169th Military Police Company traces its lineage to January 1755 as the Artillery Company of Westerly and Charlestown. As such, it is one of the few units of the U.S. Army and Army National Guard which can trace its lineage to before the American Revolution.

The company was redesignated in May 1758 as the Artillery Company of Westerly, Charlestown, and Hopkinton. It served in the American Revolution as part of the Rhode Island State Troops which were formed to protect the mainland of Rhode Island following the British occupation of Newport in late 1776.

From 1762 to 1776, the company was commanded by Captain Joseph Stanton Jr. During the American Revolution Stanton commanded a state regiment (a unit mobilized for in state service, as opposed to a regiment of the Continental Army) and later rose to become the commander of the Rhode Island Militia with the rank of major general. Following the ratification of the United States Constitution by Rhode Island in 1790, Stanton was elected as a United States Senator and later served as a United States representative from Rhode Island.

During the American Revolution, the Artillery Company of Westerly and Charlestown most probably formed one of the artillery companies of the Rhode Island state brigade which defended the mainland of Rhode Island from the British who occupied Newport from 1776 to 1779.

=== 19th century ===
In October 1812 the company was redesignated as the Washington Guards, a company of the 3rd Regiment of the Rhode Island Militia. The company was mustered into Federal service on 25 July 1814 as Captain Coe's Company, Wood's State Corps, at Fort Adams. Wood's State Corps was a battalion of militiamen called into service to supplement the state's defenses following the capture of Castine, Maine earlier in the year. Following the cessation of hostilities, the company was mustered out of Federal service on 23 February 1815 at Fort Adams.

The company was redesignated on 13 August 1855 as the Westerly Rifle Company.

Under different designations, the 169th MP Company was mobilized for service in the Civil War, Spanish–American War, Korean War, World War I and World War II.

While remaining in state service for most of the Civil War, the Westerly Rifle Company was federalized twice:

Company I, First Rhode Island Detached Militia, mustered into Federal service on 2 May 1861 at Providence and mustered out of Federal service 2 August 1861 at Providence. The regiment fought at the First Battle of Bull Run on July 21, 1861.

Company B, 9th Rhode Island Infantry Regiment mustered into Federal service 26 May 1862 at Providence. The company served at Fort Meigs in the defenses of Washington, D.C. and was mustered out of Federal service 2 September 1862 at Providence.

The company expanded in January 1873 to form the Battalion of the Westerly Rifles. It was redesignated on 1 May 1875 as Companies A and B, 3d Battalion of Infantry and again redesignated on 16 November 1881 as Companies F and E, 1st Battalion of Infantry, respectively.

Companies F and E, 1st Regiment of Infantry were consolidated on 6 April 1895 to form Company E, 1st Regiment of Infantry of the Brigade of Rhode Island Militia (BRIM).

Company E, 1st Regiment of Infantry, was activated as Company K, 1st Rhode Island Volunteer Infantry which was mustered into Federal service 18 May 1898 at Quonset Point for service in the Spanish–American War. The company, with its regiment, served stateside for the next 10 months, and was mustered out of Federal service 30 March 1899 at Columbia, South Carolina.

=== 20th century ===
In 1907, the company was converted from Infantry to Coast Artillery. It was mobilized for service at coast defense fortifications in Rhode Island during both world wars.

On 15 April 1907, the Brigade of Rhode Island Militia was redesignated as the Rhode Island National Guard. The company was converted and redesignated on 4 November 1908 as the 5th Company, 1st Artillery District, Coast Artillery Corps.

The company was redesignated on 2 January 1917 as the 5th Company, Rhode Island Coast Artillery. With the United States' declaration of war against Germany, the company was mustered into Federal service on 2 April 1917 at Westerly and drafted into Federal service 5 August 1917. The company was stationed at Fort Getty in Jamestown, Rhode Island and was redesignated on 31 August 1917 as the 19th Company, Coast Defenses of Narragansett Bay. Following the signing of the Armistice on November 11, 1918, the company was demobilized on 20 December 1918 at Fort Getty.

The company was reconstituted 28 May 1921 in the Rhode Island National Guard as the 5th Company, Coast Artillery Corps and was reorganized and Federally recognized 3 June 1921 at Westerly. On 1 October 1923 the company was redesignated as Battery E, 243d Artillery (Coast Artillery Corps).

When it became clear the United States would become involved in World War II the company was inducted into Federal service 16 September 1940 at Westerly and was assigned to Fort Wetherill in Jamestown as part of the Harbor Defenses of Narragansett Bay. It was reorganized and redesignated 7 October 1944 as Battery A, 189th Coast Artillery Battalion and was inactivated on 1 April 1945 at Fort Wetherill, Rhode Island.

With the reorganization of the Rhode Island National Guard following World War II, the company was redesignated on 2 July 1946 as Battery D, 705th Antiaircraft Artillery Gun Battalion and was federally recognized 23 April 1947.

During the Korean War Battery D was ordered into active Federal service 14 August 1950 at Westerly. As part of the 705th AAA Battalion it served on Okinawa as an air defense unit. It was released from active Federal service 13 July 1952 and reverted to state control.

The company was redesignated on 1 October 1953 as Battery D, 705th Antiaircraft Artillery Battalion. It was redesignated again on 1 April 1959 as Battery D, 1st Automatic Weapons Battalion, 243d Artillery.

The company was converted and redesignated on 1 May 1962 as Company C, 243rd Engineer Battalion.

=== Military police company ===
The company had been redesignated a number of times over the past two centuries, and finally assumed its current designation as the 169th Military Police Company in 1968 and assigned as a subordinate unit of the 243rd Military Police Battalion and the newly formed 43rd Military Police Brigade. The primary reason for the unit being designated as a Military Police unit was the high levels of civil unrest which swept the country in the late 1960s. National Guard troops were frequently called upon to quell riots and Military Police units were given specialized training for that mission.

In 1978, the 169th along with the entirety of the Rhode Island National Guard, was mobilized in response to the Great Blizzard of 1978.

In 1990, the 1111th Military Police Company was re-designated as Detachment 1, 169th Military Police Company. Detachment 1 continued to drill at the 1111th MP Company's armory in Middletown, Rhode Island.

During Operation Desert Storm, in late 1990 to early 1991, personnel from the 169th were used to fill out units of the Rhode Island National Guard deployed during that operation.

In 1995, the unit moved from its long time home at the Westerly Armory in Westerly, Rhode Island to the Warren Armory in Warren, Rhode Island. Detachment 1 (see above) was fully integrated with the main body of the company at this time. In 1996, the 243rd Military Police Battalion was disbanded and the 169th was transferred to the 118th Military Police Battalion.

In 2003, a 30 soldier detachment of the 169th was mobilized and sent to Guantanamo Bay, Cuba to perform security duties. They were demobilized in 2004. Other personnel from the 169th were mobilized to fill vacancies in the 115th and 119th Military Police companies when they were mobilized for service in Operation Iraqi Freedom early in 2003.

The 169th MP Company was mobilized for service in Iraq in 2007 to 2008. In this assignment, it was attached to the 2nd Marine Division and received the Navy Unit Commendation, a rare distinction for an Army unit.

In 2008, the 119th Military Police Company was deactivated and consolidated with the 169th Military Police Company. While a younger unit, the 119th MP Company had been mobilized for service in Operation Desert Storm in 1990 to 1991, Operation Joint Forge in Hungary and Bosnia in 2000 to 2001 and for service in Iraq in 2003 to 2004. The result of the consolidation is that the 169th shares the lineage of both itself and the 119th MP Company as well as the 1111th MP Company which it merged with in 1990.

In August 2012, the 169th was mobilized for deployment to Afghanistan. The unit returned home and was demobilized in September 2013.

== Lineage ==
(The information below was taken from the website of the US Army Center for Military History and is in the public domain.)

=== 169th Military Police Company ===
Organized and chartered in January 1755 in the Rhode Island Militia at Westerly as the Artillery Company of Westerly and Charlestown.

Redesignated in May 1758 as the Artillery Company of Westerly, Charlestown, and Hopkinton.

Redesignated in October 1812 as the Washington Guards, a company of the 3d Regiment.

Mustered into Federal service 25 July 1814 as Captain Coe's Company, Wood's State Corps, at Fort Adams, Rhode Island; mustered out of Federal service 23 February 1815 at Fort Adams, Rhode Island.

Redesignated 13 August 1855 as the Westerly Rifle Company, a separate company.

While remaining in state service during the Civil War, the Westerly Rifle Company additionally formed the following units:

Company I, 1st Rhode Island Detached Militia, mustered into Federal service 2 May 1861 at Providence and fought at the Battle of Bull Run; mustered out of Federal service 2 August 1861 at Providence.

Company B, 9th Rhode Island Volunteer Infantry Regiment mustered into Federal service 26 May 1862 at Providence for duty in the defenses of Washington, D.C.; mustered out of Federal service 2 September 1862 at Providence.

Expanded in January 1873 to form the Battalion of the Westerly Rifles.

Redesignated 1 May 1875 as Companies A and B, 3d Battalion of Infantry.

Redesignated 16 November 1881 as Companies F and E, 1st Battalion of Infantry, respectively.

Redesignated 1 June 1887 as Companies F and E, 1st Regiment of Infantry, respectively (Rhode Island Militia concurrently redesignated as the Brigade of Rhode Island Militia).

Companies F and E, 1st Regiment of Infantry, consolidated 6 April 1895 to form Company E, 1st Regiment of Infantry.

While remaining in state service Company E, 1st Regiment of Infantry, additionally formed Company K, 1st Rhode Island Volunteer Infantry; mustered into Federal service 18 May 1898 at Quonset Point for service in the Spanish–American War. The regiment served in Virginia, Pennsylvania and South Carolina and mustered out of Federal service 30 March 1899 at Columbia, South Carolina.

(The Brigade of Rhode Island Militia was redesignated on 15 April 1907 as the Rhode Island National Guard.)

Converted and redesignated 4 November 1908 as the 5th Company, 1st Artillery District, Coast Artillery Corps.

Redesignated 3 September 1914 as the 5th Company, 1st Coast Defense Command, Coast Artillery Corps.

Redesignated 18 December 1914 as the 5th Company, 1st Coast Artillery District, Coast Artillery Corps.

Redesignated 2 January 1917 as the 5th Company, Rhode Island Coast Artillery.

Mustered into Federal service 2 April 1917 at Westerly; drafted into Federal service 5 August 1917 for service with the Coast Defenses of Narragansett Bay.

Redesignated 31 August 1917 as the 19th Company, Coast Defenses of Narragansett Bay.

Demobilizated 20 December 1918 at Fort Getty, Rhode Island.

Reconstituted 28 May 1921 in the Rhode Island National Guard as the 5th Company, Coast Artillery Corps.

Reorganized and Federally recognized 3 June 1921 at Westerly.

Reorganized and redesignated 31 January 1922 as the 349th Company, Coast Artillery Corps.

Reorganized and redesignated 1 October 1923 as Battery E, 243d Artillery (Coast Artillery Corps).

Reorganized and redesignated 11 July 1924 as Battery E, 243d Coast Artillery.

Inducted into Federal service 16 September 1940 at Westerly.

Reorganized and redesignated 7 October 1944 as Battery A, 189th Coast Artillery Battalion.

Inactivated 1 April 1945 at Fort Wetherill, Rhode Island.

Redesignated 2 July 1946 as Battery D, 705th Antiaircraft Artillery Gun Battalion.

Reorganized and Federally recognized 23 April 1947 at Westerly.

Ordered into active Federal service 14 August 1950 at Westerly; released from active Federal service 13 July 1952 and reverted to state control.

Reorganized and redesignated 1 October 1953 as Battery D, 705th Antiaircraft Artillery Battalion.

Reorganized and redesignated 1 April 1959 as Battery D, 1st Automatic Weapons Battalion, 243d Artillery

Converted and redesignated 1 May 1962 as Company C, 243d Engineer Battalion.

Converted and redesignated 1 January 1968 as the 169th Military Police Company.

Location changed 14 April 1995 to Warren.

Consolidated 20 April 1995 with Detachment 1, 169th Military Police Company at Middletown (see ANNEX 1) and consolidated unit designated as the 169th Military Police Company.

Ordered into active Federal service 3 August 2003 at Warren for duty at Guantanamo Bay, Cuba in support of Operation Enduring Freedom; released from active Federal service 1 August 2004 and reverted to state control.

Ordered into active Federal service 1 July 2007 at Warren for duty in Iraq in support of Operation Iraqi Freedom; released from active Federal service 3 August 2008 and reverted to state control.

Consolidated 15 November 2008 with the 119th Military Police Company (see ANNEX 2), and consolidated unit designated as the 169th Military Police Company.

Ordered into active Federal service 7 August 2012 at Warren for duty in Afghanistan in support of Operation Enduring Freedom; released from active Federal service 10 September 2013 and reverted to state control.

=== ANNEX 1 ===
Lineage of the 1111th Military Police Company

Organized and Federally recognized 7 May 1929 in the Rhode Island National Guard at Newport as Company F, 118th Engineers, an element of the 43d Division.

Inducted into Federal service 24 February 1941 at Newport.

Reorganized and redesignated 19 February 1942 as Company F, 177th Engineers; concurrently, relieved from assignment to the 43d Division.

Reorganized and redesignated 1 August 1942 as Company F, 177th Engineer General Service Regiment.

Disbanded 14 November 1944 at Anchorage, Alaska Territory.

Reconstituted 8 May 1945 in the Rhode Island National Guard.

Converted and redesignated 2 July 1946 as Battery B, Antiaircraft Artillery Automatic Weapons Battalion.

Reorganized and Federally recognized 14 April 1947 at Newport.

Reorganized and redesignated 1 August 1951 as Battery B, 243d Antiaircraft Artillery Gun Battalion.

Redesignated 1 October 1953 as Battery B, 243d Antiaircraft Artillery Battalion.

Reorganized and redesignated 1 October 1958 as Battery A, 705th Antiaircraft Artillery Battalion.

Reorganized and redesignated 1 April 1959 as Battery A, 1st Automatic Weapons Battalion, 243d Artillery.

Converted and redesignated 1 May 1962 as Company A, 243d Engineer Battalion.

Converted and redesignated 1 February 1968 as Company A, 118th Military Police Battalion.

Reorganized and redesignated 1 March 1972 as the 1111th Military Police Company.

Location changed 1 December 1983 to Bristol, Rhode Island.

Location changed 1 December 1987 to Middletown, Rhode Island.

Reorganized and redesignated 1 July 1990 as Detachment 1, 169th Military Police Company.

Consolidated 20 April 1995 with 169th Military Police Company.

=== ANNEX 2 ===
Lineage of the 119th Military Police Company

Constituted 1 March 1949 in the Rhode Island Army National Guard as Company D, 118th Engineer Combat Battalion, an element of the 43d Infantry Division.

Organized and Federally recognized 20 April 1949 at Warren, Rhode Island.

Ordered into Federal service 5 September 1950 at Warren, Rhode Island.

(Company D, 118th Engineer Combat Battalion [NGUS] organized and Federally recognized 15 October 1952 at Warren; reorganized and redesignated 1 April 1953 as Company D, 118th Engineer Battalion [NGUS]).

Reorganized and redesignated 5 June 1953 as Company D, 118th Engineer Battalion.

Released 15 June 1954 from active Federal service and reverted to state control; concurrently, Federal recognition withdrawn from Company D, 118th Engineer Battalion (NGUS).

Consolidated 18 March 1963 with Company E, 118th Engineer Battalion (organized and Federally recognized 1 April 1959 at Providence) and consolidated unit redesignated as Company C, 118th Engineer Battalion; concurrently, relieved from assignment to the 43d Infantry Division.

Converted and redesignated 1 May 1968 as Company C, 118th Military Police Battalion; location concurrently changed to Providence, Rhode Island.

Reorganized and redesignated 1 March 1972 as the 119th Military Police Company.

Location changed 1 March 1989 to Warwick, Rhode Island.

Ordered into Federal service 6 January 1991 at Warwick for duty in Saudi Arabia and Kuwait in support of Operation Desert Storm; released 6 May 1991 from active Federal service and reverted to state control.

Ordered into Federal service 3 August 2000 at Warwick for duty in Hungary in support of Operation Joint Forge; released 11 April 2001 from active Federal service and reverted to state control.

Ordered into Federal service 7 February 2003 at Warwick for duty in Kuwait and Iraq in support of Operation Iraqi Freedom; released 1 June 2004 from active Federal service and reverted to state control.

Consolidated 15 November 2008 with the 169th Military Police Company.

== Honors ==
Campaign Participation Credit

- Revolutionary War
  - Rhode Island 1777
  - Rhode Island 1778
- War of 1812
  - Streamer without inscription
- Civil War
  - Bull Run
- World War II
  - Aleutian Islands
- Southwest Asia
  - Liberation and Defense of Kuwait
  - Cease Fire
- Iraq
  - Transition of Iraq
  - Iraqi Surge
- Afghanistan
  - Transition I

Unit awards

- Meritorious Unit Commendation (Army), Streamer embroidered: "IRAQ 2007-2008".
- Navy Unit Commendation (2008)
