= 3rd Rhode Island Cavalry Regiment =

- Active: September 12, 1863, to November 29, 1865
- Country: United States
- Allegiance: Union
- Branch: Cavalry
- Engagements: Red River Campaign

The 3rd Rhode Island Cavalry Regiment was a cavalry regiment that served in the Union Army during the American Civil War. The regiment briefly served dismounted as infantry in the defenses of New Orleans, June–September, 1864.

== Service ==
The 3rd Rhode Island Cavalry Regiment was organized in Providence, Rhode Island and mustered in September 12, 1863, for a three-year enlistment. On January 14, 1864, the 2nd Rhode Island Cavalry (by this time it was battalion strength) was transferred to 3rd Rhode Island Cavalry.

The regiment was attached to Defenses of New Orleans, Department of the Gulf, to March 1864. 5th Brigade, Cavalry Division, Department of the Gulf, to June 1864. Defenses of New Orleans, Louisiana, to October 1864. District of LaFourche, Department of the Gulf, to November 1865.

The 3rd Rhode Island Cavalry mustered out of service November 29, 1865.

== Detailed service ==
1st Battalion moved to New Orleans, La., December 31, 1863, to January 14, 1864 aboard the steamer Western Metropolis. Red River Campaign March 10-May 22, 1864. Advance to Alexandria March 14–26. Monett's Ferry and Cloutiersville March 29–30. Natchitoches March 31. Campti April 4. Sabine Cross Roads April 8. Pleasant Hill April 9. Natchitoches April 19. (Companies E, F, and L moved to join the regiment at Alexandria April 20–22.) Action at Tunica Bend April 21. About Cloutiersville April 22–24. Monett's Ferry or Cane River Crossing April 23. Gov. Moore's Plantation May 1–2. Alexandria May 11–12. Retreat from Alexandria to Morganza May 13–20. Natchitoches May 14. Mansura May 16. Near Moreauville May 17. Yellow Bayou May 18. Near Morganza May 24. Reached Fort Banks, opposite New Orleans, June 2. Companies G and H reported at New Orleans May 8 and joined the regiment at Greenville June 10. Regiment dismounted June 22, and served duty as infantry in the defenses of New Orleans until September. Remounted September 20. Assigned to duty in the District of LaFourche at Donaldsonville, Napoleonville, Thibodeaux, Camp Parapet, Plaquemine, Houma, Hermitage Plantation, and other points in Louisiana, scouting and patrol duty and operating against guerrillas, until November 1865. Action at Napoleonville November 1, 1864, and at Doyall's Plantation November 29. 1864 (detachment). Expedition from Brashear City to Whiskey Bayou January 16–18, 1865 (Companies B, I, and K). Expedition from Napoleonville to Grand River January 18–19 (detachment). Scout from Donaldsonville January 19–20 (detachment). Skirmish, Thompson's Plantation, January 23. Scouts from Bayou Goula to Grand River January 29-February 7. Skirmish, Richland Plantation, January 30. Expedition from Thibodeaux to Lake Verret and Bayou Planton January 30–31 (Company H). Near Lake Verret January 30. Skirmish, Kittredge's Sugar House, near Napoleon, February 10. Expedition from Donaldsonville to Grand Bayou and Bayou Goula February 14–18. Skirmish, Martin's Lane, February 15 (Companies D, F, and K). Expedition from Plaquemine to the Park February 17–22 (detachment). Expedition from the Hermitage to the French Settlement April 2–5 (detachment). Expedition to Lake Verret, Grand Bayou, etc., April 2–10. Expedition from Terre Bonne to Pelion's Plantation and Grand Caillou April 19–25 (Company M). operations about Brashear City April 30-May 12. Bayou Goula May 9. Expedition from Bayou Boeuf to Bayou de Large May 25–27. Affair, Bayou de Large, May 27.

== Casualties ==
The regiment lost a total of 147 men during service; 8 enlisted men killed or mortally wounded, 4 officers and 135 enlisted men died of disease.

== Commanders ==
- Lieutenant Colonel Charles H. Parkhurst

== See also ==
- List of Rhode Island Civil War units
- Rhode Island in the American Civil War
