= List of Rhode Island units in the American Civil War =

List of military units raised by the state of Rhode Island during the American Civil War.

== Artillery units ==
- 1st Rhode Island Light Artillery
  - Battery A, 1st Rhode Island Light Artillery
  - Battery B, 1st Rhode Island Light Artillery
  - Battery C, 1st Rhode Island Light Artillery
  - Battery D, 1st Rhode Island Light Artillery
  - Battery E, 1st Rhode Island Light Artillery
  - Battery F, 1st Rhode Island Light Artillery
  - Battery G, 1st Rhode Island Light Artillery
  - Battery H, 1st Rhode Island Light Artillery
- 3rd Rhode Island Heavy Artillery
- 5th Rhode Island Heavy Artillery
- 14th Rhode Island Heavy Artillery (Colored) (a.k.a. 11th United States Colored Troops)
- 1st Rhode Island Battery (a.k.a. Tompkin's Marine Artillery)
- 10th Rhode Island Battery

== Cavalry ==
- 1st Rhode Island Cavalry
- 2nd Rhode Island Cavalry

- 3rd Rhode Island Cavalry
- 7th Squadron, Rhode Island Cavalry

== Infantry ==
- 1st Rhode Island Infantry
- 2nd Rhode Island Infantry
- 3rd Rhode Island Infantry
- 4th Rhode Island Infantry
- 5th Rhode Island Infantry
- 6th Rhode Island Infantry - failed to complete organization

- 7th Rhode Island Infantry
- 9th Rhode Island Infantry
- 10th Rhode Island Infantry
- 11th Rhode Island Infantry
- 12th Rhode Island Infantry

== Miscellaneous ==
- Independent Company Hospital Guards

== See also ==
- Rhode Island in the American Civil War
- Lists of American Civil War Regiments by State
- United States Colored Troops
