= 10th Rhode Island Battery =

10th Rhode Island Light Artillery Battery
- Active: May 1862–August 30, 1862
- Disbanded: August 30, 1862
- Country: United States
- Allegiance: Union
- Branch: Artillery
- Engagements: American Civil War

10th Rhode Island Battery was an artillery battery that served in the Union Army during the American Civil War.

== Service ==
The battery was organized in Providence, Rhode Island in May 1862 and mustered in for three months' service. It was commanded by Captain Edwin C. Gallup. The battery was formed from volunteers from the Providence Marine Corps of Artillery.

The battery moved to Washington, D.C., May 27–29, 1862 and was attached to Whipple's Command, Military District of Washington. Served duty at Camp Frieze, Tennallytown, until June 23. At Cloud's Mills until June 30, and near Fort Pennsylvania until August.

The 10th Rhode Island Battery mustered out of service August 30, 1862.

== See also ==
- List of Rhode Island Civil War units
- Rhode Island in the American Civil War
