= William Rogers Taylor =

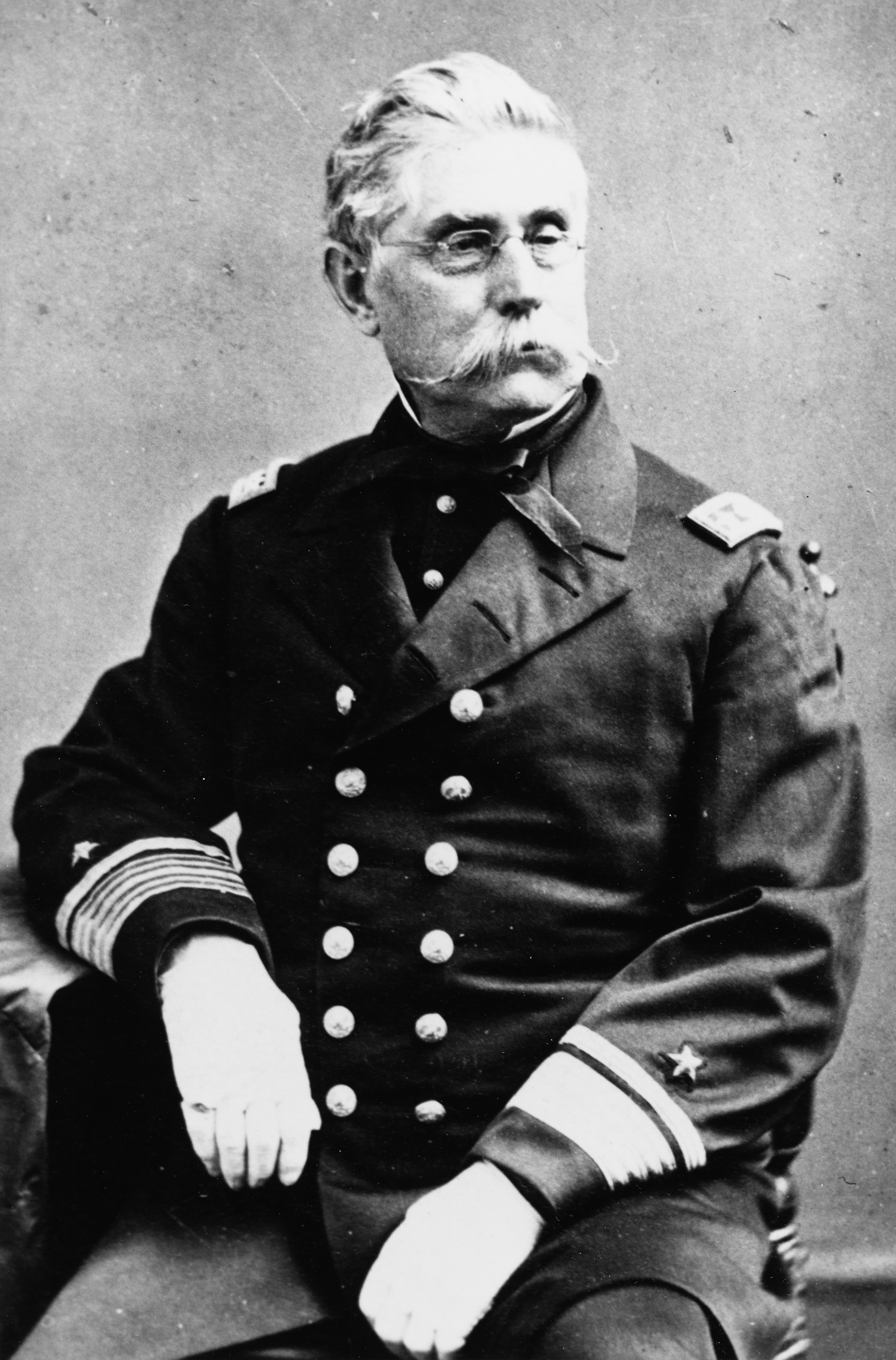
- Rear Admiral Taylor
- Born: 7 November 1811; Newport, Rhode Island
- Died: 14 April 1889 (aged 77); Washington, D.C.
- Military career
- Allegiance: United States of America
- Branch: United States Navy
- Service years: 1828–1873
- Rank: Rear Admiral
- Commands: Housatonic; Juniata; Northern Pacific Squadron Division, Pacific Squadron
- Conflicts: Mexican–American War; American Civil War

Signature
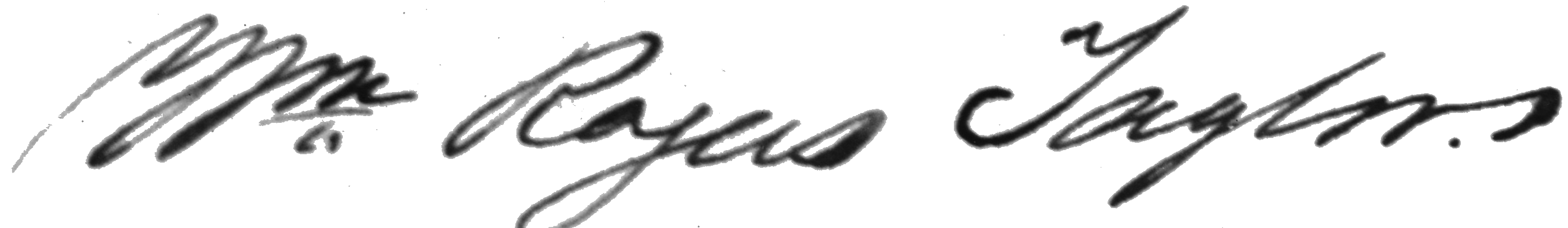

William Rogers Taylor (7 November 1811 – 14 April 1889) was a rear admiral of the United States Navy who served during the Mexican–American War and the American Civil War.

== Biography ==
Taylor was born in Newport, Rhode Island. He was appointed as a U.S. Navy midshipman in 1828, served in the sloops of war St. Louis and Peacock during the next decade, and was promoted to the rank of lieutenant in 1840. He next had United States Coast Survey duty, then was an officer of the sloop of war St. Mary's during the Mexican War, when he also served in the Naval Battery during the siege of Vera Cruz. In 1848–49 he was assigned to the Naval Asylum in Philadelphia, then to the sloop of war Albany. For eight years, beginning in 1853, he primarily served in the field of naval ordnance. In 1855, he received promotion to commander.

Promoted to the rank of captain in July 1862, he commanded the steam sloop Housatonic during the next several months. In 1863, he was Fleet Captain of the South Atlantic Blockading Squadron. In that role, he participated in attacks on Confederate fortifications protecting Charleston, South Carolina. Captain Taylor commanded the steam sloop Juniata during 1864–65 and took part in the operations that led to the capture of Fort Fisher, North Carolina.

In 1866, a year after the end of the Civil War, Taylor was advanced to the rank of commodore. For the next five years, he had further ordnance duty and commanded the Northern Pacific Squadron Division of the Pacific Squadron. He reached the rank of rear admiral in early 1871 and spent his final active duty period as President of the Board of Examiners. Rear Admiral William Rogers Taylor was placed on the Retired List in November 1873.

Taylor died at Washington, D.C., on 14 April 1889.

== Namesake ==
The destroyer Taylor (DD-468) (1942–1969) was named for him.
