= Fort Sumner (Maryland) =

Historical fort in Montgomery County, Maryland, US

- Part of the Civil War Defenses of Washington
- Montgomery County, Maryland
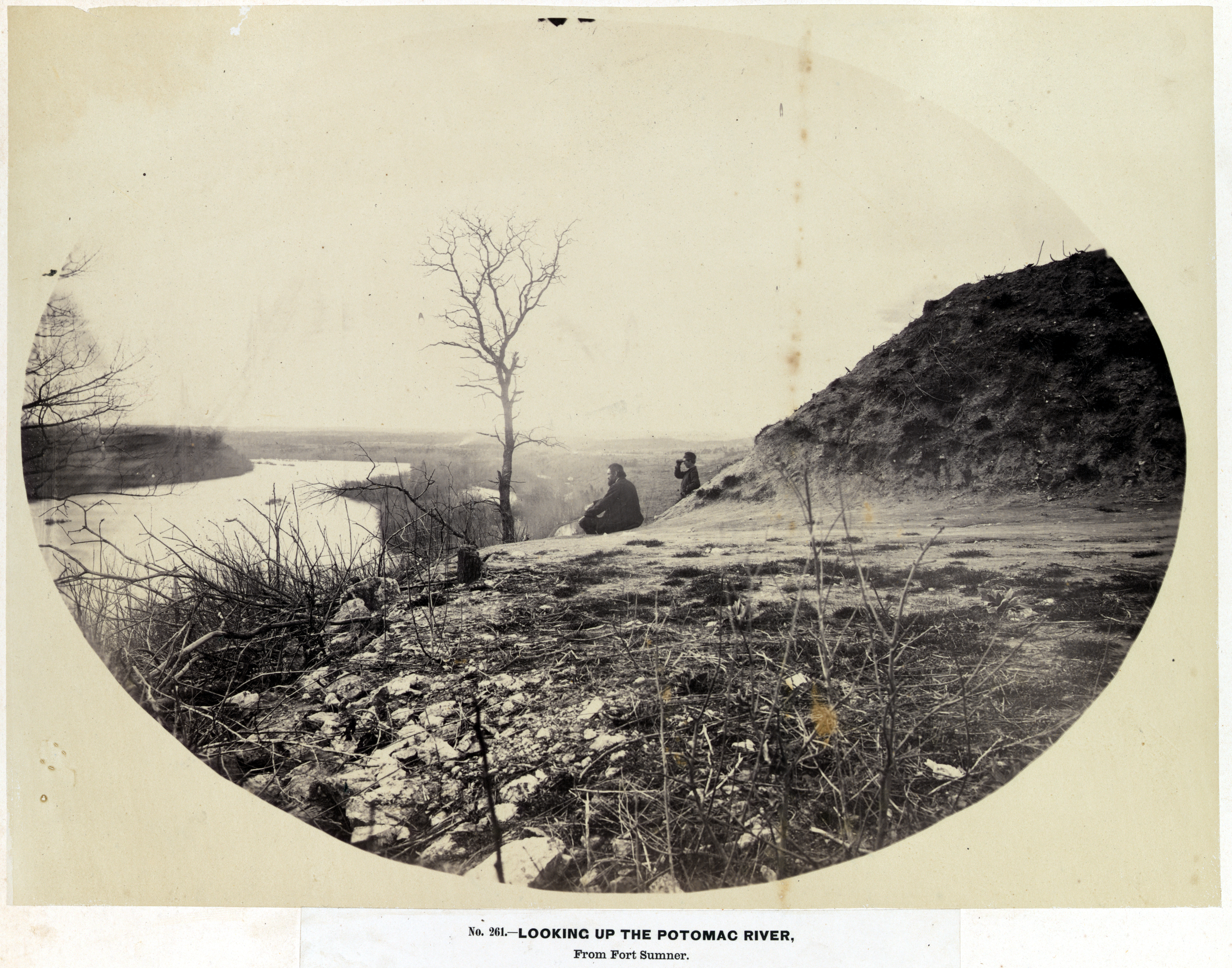
- View of the Potomac River from Fort Sumner

Site information
- Type: Earthwork fort
- Controlled by: Union Army
- Condition: Residential area

Location
- Coordinates: 38°57′19″N 77°07′26″W

Site history
- Built: 1861; 165 years ago
- Built by: U.S. Army Corps of Engineers
- In use: 1861–1865
- Materials: Earth, timber
- Demolished: 1953
- Battles/wars: American Civil War

Fort Sumner was built during the American Civil War by the Union Army in the Brookmont section of Bethesda, Maryland, just northwest of Washington, D.C.

== Construction ==
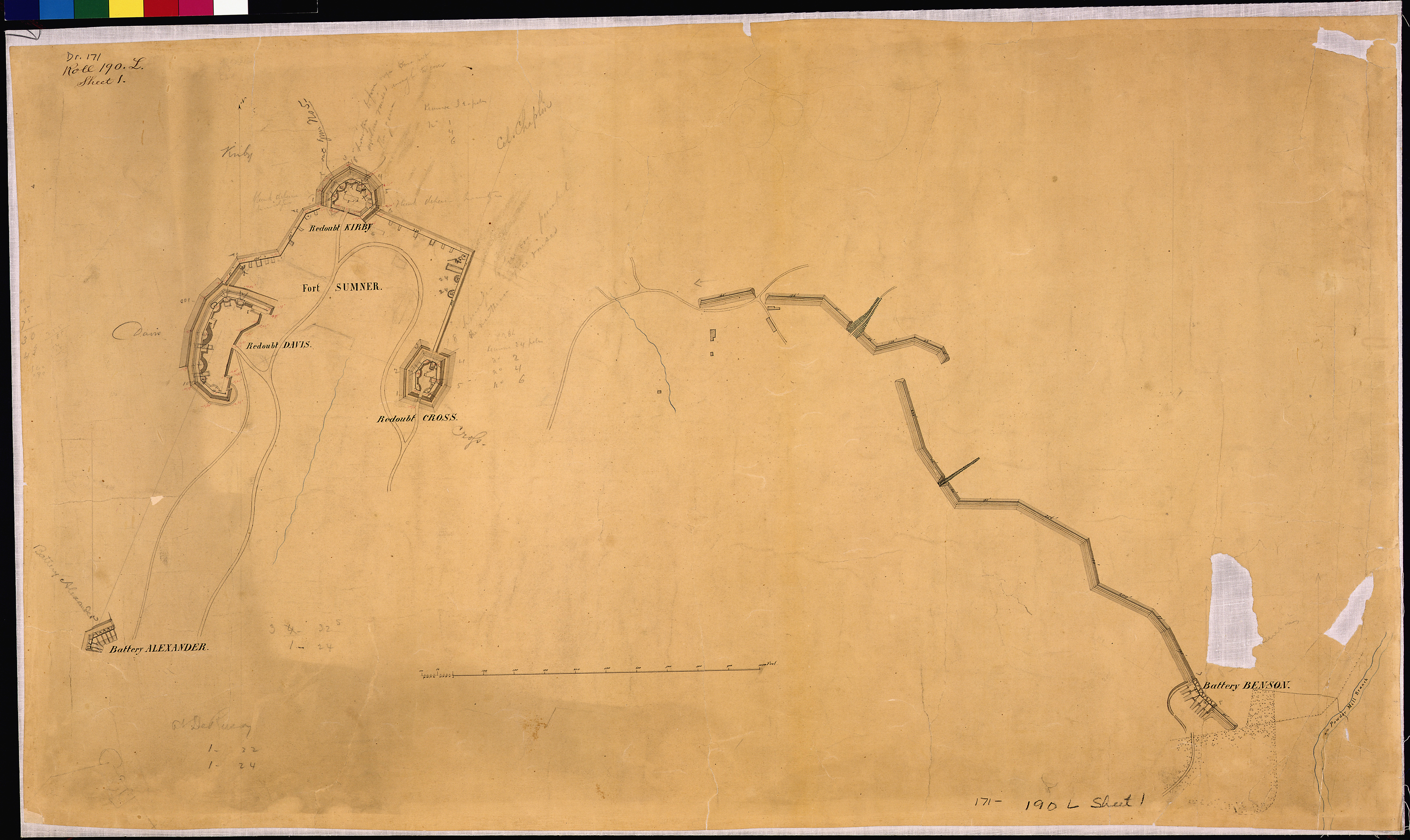
Plan of Fort Sumner

Barracks at Fort Sumner

The earthwork fort was an 1863 expansion of Fort Alexander, Fort Ripley, and Fort Franklin, which were built to protect the Washington Aqueduct, the new water supply for the city, and the adjacent Potomac River shoreline. Fort Sumner was named for Major General Edwin Vose Sumner, who died in 1863 from fever he contracted while at his daughter's house.

The fort had a commanding view above the Potomac River and included 30 artillery pieces. In addition to the aforementioned components, the site was situated near Battery Bailey and Battery Benson, overlooking Little Falls Branch.

Battery Bailey was named for Captain Guilford D. Bailey, killed in action at the Battle of Fair Oaks, and Battery Benson was named for Captain Henry Benson, mortally wounded in action at the second engagement at Malvern Hill.

== Remains ==
Fort Sumner was razed in 1953. There are a few visible remains of Battery Bailey in Westmoreland Hills Park, which can be seen from the adjacent Capital Crescent Trail. Part of the site was acquired by the Army Map Service (AMS) early in World War II and renamed Fort Sumner. The AMS was renamed US Army Topographic Command in 1968 and merged into the Defense Mapping Agency in 1972, at which time the site was renamed Defense Mapping Agency Topographic Center. The Defense Mapping Agency and its successors, the National Imagery and Mapping Agency and the National Geospatial-Intelligence Agency, occupied the site until the early 2010s. In 2011 the site was redeveloped with new construction for the Intelligence Community Campus-Bethesda, which formally opened in 2015.

The residential area that was built over Fort Sumner has a plaque about the fort at Sangamore Road and Westpath Way, and portions of it are named "Fort Sumner Hills" and "Sumner Village".

== Gallery ==
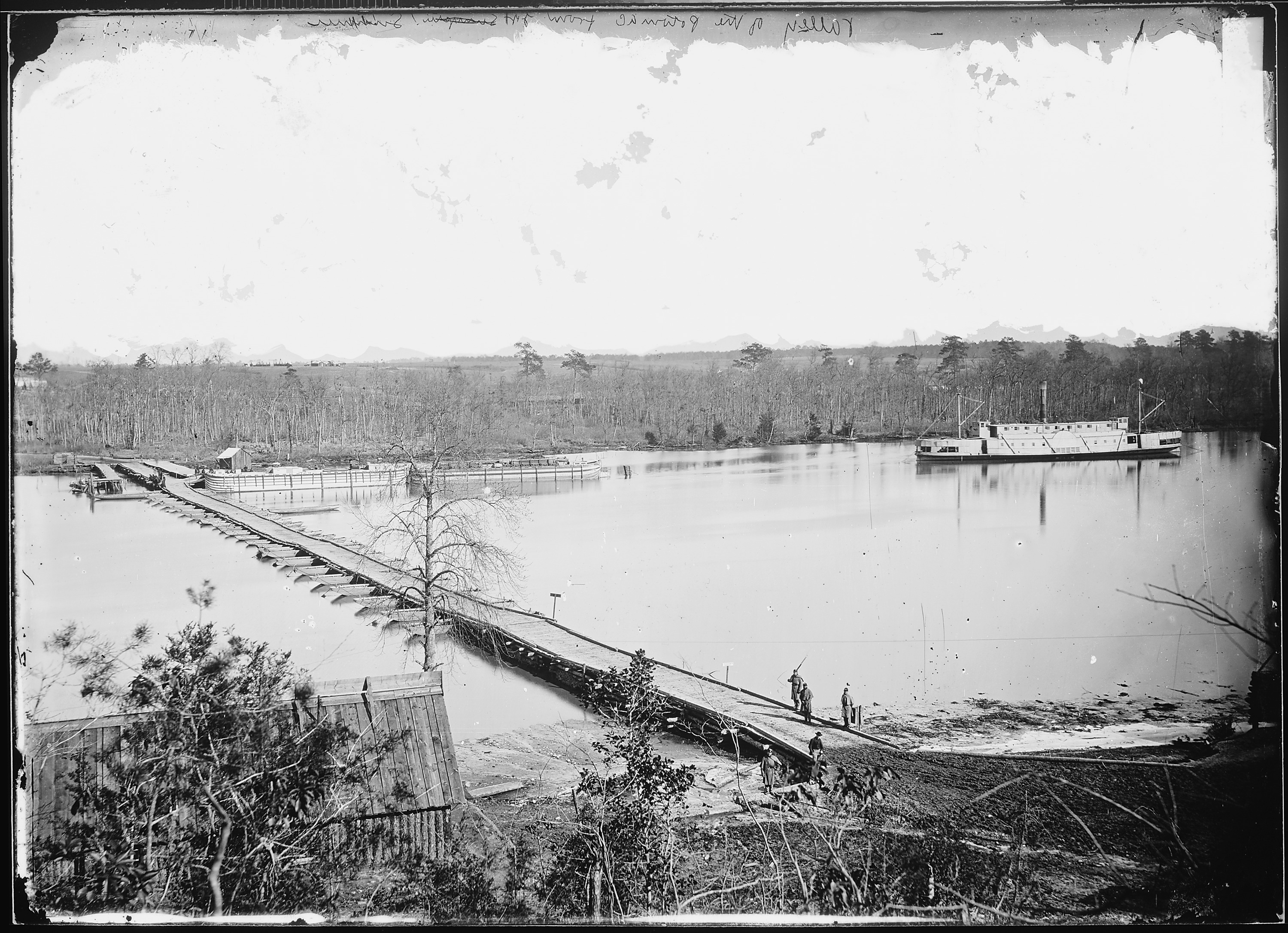
Pontoon bridge from Fort Sumner

== See also ==
- Civil War Defenses of Washington
