= Zenas Bliss =

US Army general and Medal of Honor recipient (1835–1900)

Zenas R. Bliss
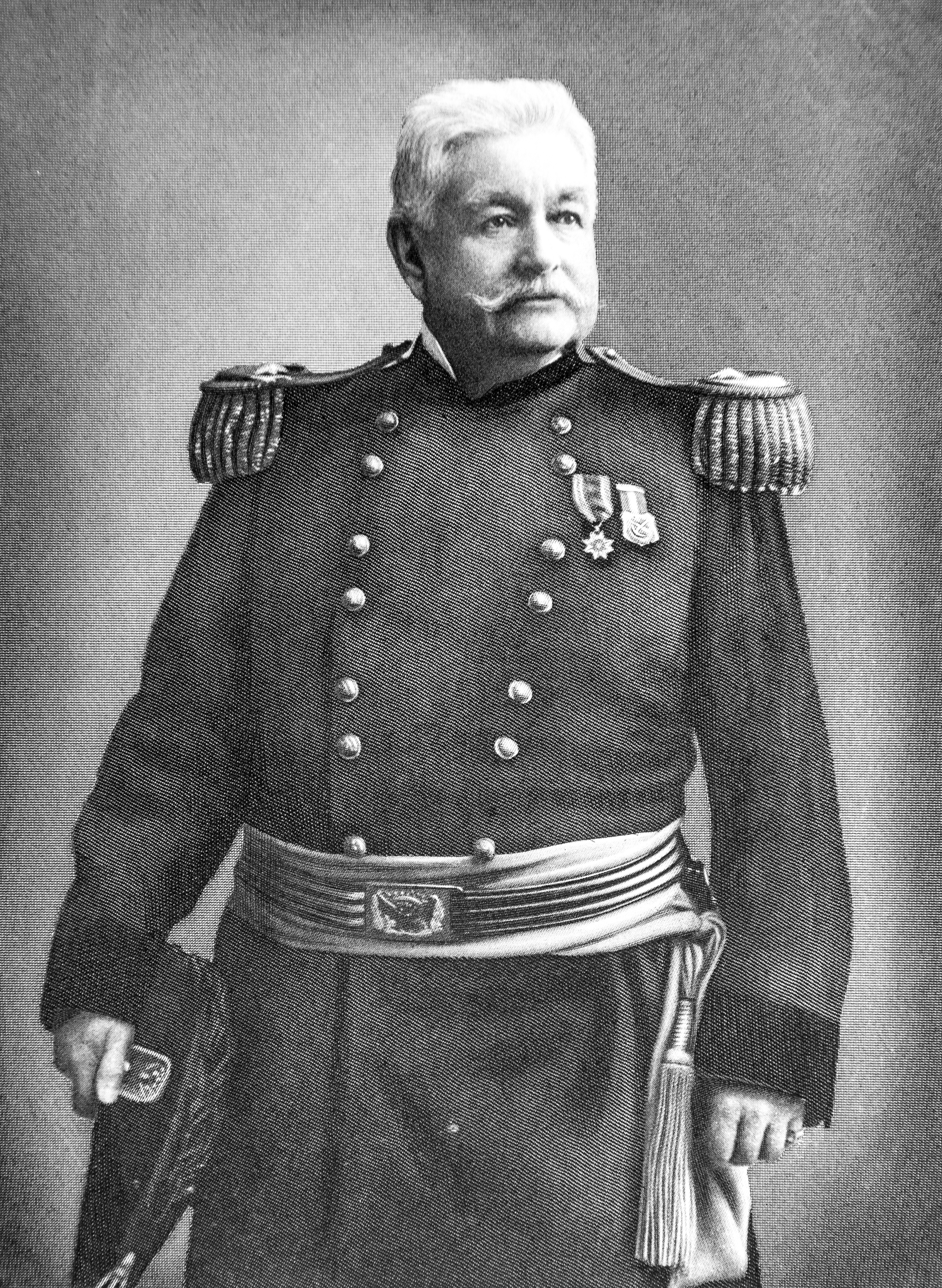
- Major General Zenas R. Bliss
- Born: April 17, 1835; Johnston, Rhode Island, US
- Died: January 2, 1900 (aged 64); Washington, D.C., US
- Burial place: Arlington National Cemetery
- Military career
- Allegiance: United States; Union
- Branch: United States Army; Union Army
- Service years: 1854–1897
- Rank: Major General
- Commands: 10th Regiment Rhode Island Volunteer Infantry; 7th Regiment Rhode Island Volunteer Infantry; 1st Brigade, 2nd Division, IX Corps; 24th U.S. Infantry; Department of Texas
- Conflicts: American Civil War; Indian Wars
- Awards: Medal of Honor
- Other work: author

Zenas Randall Bliss (April 17, 1835 – January 2, 1900) was an officer and general in the United States Army and a recipient of the Medal of Honor. He formed the first unit of Seminole-Negro Indian Scouts, and his detailed memoirs chronicled life on the Texas frontier. He was the father of Rhode Island Lieutenant Governor Zenas Work Bliss.

Bliss was a native of Rhode Island and graduated from West Point in 1854. He served most of his thirty-seven-year career on the Texas frontier, and served in the Union Army during the American Civil War. During the Civil War he was captured by Confederate forces and held as a prisoner of war. Bliss received the Medal of Honor for his actions while leading his regiment at the Battle of Fredericksburg.

== Early life and military career ==
Bliss was born April 17, 1835, in Johnston, Rhode Island to an upper-middle-class family. His parents were Zenas and Phebe Waterman Randall Bliss. He received an appointment to the United States Military Academy at West Point, New York, in July 1850 when he was only fifteen years old. He graduated from West Point in 1854 and served the next six years in Texas. He was stationed at Fort Davis and Fort Quitman, but his first assignment was as a brevet second lieutenant in the 1st U.S. Infantry regiment at Fort Duncan. He was promoted to the full rank of second lieutenant in the 8th U.S. Infantry on March 3, 1855, and subsequently promoted to first lieutenant on October 17, 1860. Following the outbreak of the Civil War, he was promoted to captain on May 14, 1861.

=== Civil War service ===
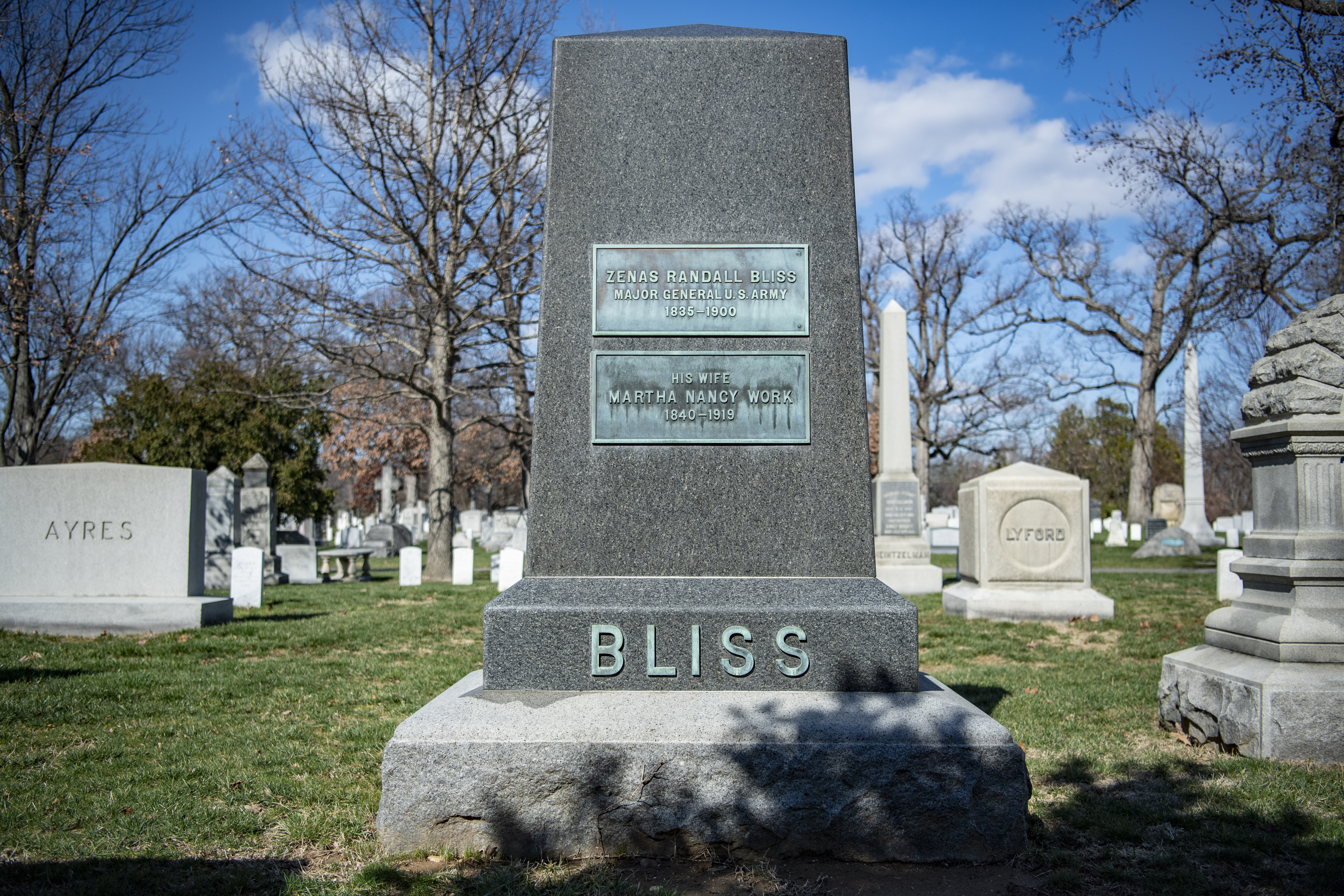
Grave at Arlington National Cemetery

When the American Civil War began on April 12, 1861, Bliss immediately saw action. He was captured by Confederate forces and spent eleven months as a prisoner of war, first in San Antonio, Texas, and later in Richmond, Virginia. He was finally exchanged in April 1862 and sent back to Union lines, where he was commissioned as Colonel of the Tenth Rhode Island Infantry the following month. The 10th Rhode Island served for only 90 days and was used in the defenses of Washington, D.C. After the 10th Rhode Island was discharged, Bliss assumed command of the Seventh Rhode Island Infantry on August 21, 1862. In October 1862 the Seventh Rhode Island joined the First Brigade, Second Division, Ninth Corps, Army of the Potomac. The regiment saw action in December 1862 at the Battle of Fredericksburg, during which Bliss performed actions that earned him the Medal of Honor several decades later. When IX Corps was sent West, it participated in the Siege of Vicksburg. The Seventh served under Major General William T. Sherman in the capture of Jackson, Mississippi.

In April 1864 the Seventh rejoined the Army of the Potomac. Bliss became commander of the First Brigade, Second Division, Ninth Corps. His brigade fought in the Battle of the Wilderness. Bliss was badly injured by a horse at Spotsylvania, but he returned to lead his brigade in the Siege of Petersburg and the Battle of the Crater. The court of inquiry following the fiasco at the Crater censured Bliss, but he remained on duty. During the Civil War, Bliss received a brevet (honorary promotion) to major dated December 13, 1862, for "gallantry and meritorious service" in the Battle of Fredericksburg. He was later breveted to lieutenant colonel on May 7, 1864, for "gallantry and meritorious service" in the Battle of the Wilderness. Bliss was mustered out of volunteer service on June 9, 1865, and reverted to his Regular Army rank of captain. He was awarded the Medal of Honor on December 3, 1898, for valor during the Battle of Fredericksburg.

== Postbellum career ==
Bliss remained in the Regular Army after the Civil War and was promoted to major of the 39th Infantry Regiment on August 6, 1867. He was promoted to lieutenant colonel of the 19th Infantry on March 4, 1879, and to colonel of the 24th Infantry (a unit with black soldiers and white officers) on April 20, 1886. Bliss commanded the Department of Texas as a brigadier general on April 24, 1895; during this command, his aide-de-camp was William J. Glasgow. He was promoted to major general on May 14, 1897 and retired on May 22. Including his four years at West Point, Bliss had served 46 years, 10 months and 22 days in uniform when he retired.

Bliss died in Washington, D.C. January 2, 1900, at age 64. He is buried alongside his wife at Arlington National Cemetery, in Arlington, Virginia.

Bliss and his wife had four children, two of whom lived to adulthood. One of his sons was Zenas Work Bliss (1867–1957) who served as lieutenant governor of Rhode Island from 1910 to 1913.

== Medal of Honor citation ==
Rank and organization: Colonel, Seventh Rhode Island Infantry. Place and date: At Fredericksburg, VA., 13 Dec 1862.

This officer, to encourage his regiment; which had never before been in action, and which had been ordered to lie down to protect itself from the enemy's fire, arose to his feet, advanced in front of the line, and himself fired several shots at the enemy at short range, being fully exposed to their fire at the time.

== See also ==
- List of American Civil War Medal of Honor recipients: A–F
