= 9th Rhode Island Infantry Regiment =

- Active: May 26, 1862 to September 2, 1862
- Country: United States
- Allegiance: Union
- Branch: Infantry
- Engagements: American Civil War

The 9th Rhode Island Infantry Regiment was a unit of the Union Army during the American Civil War; raised in Rhode Island and seeing service between May and September 1862.

== History ==
Organized at Providence May 26, 1862, the 9th Rhode Island Infantry Regiment moved to Washington, D. C., by detachments on May 27 and 29. Duty at Camp Frieze, Tennallytown, till July. Moved to Fairfax Seminary, Va., July 1. Garrison duty in the Defences of Washington till September. Company "A" at Fort Greble, "B" at Fort Meigs, "C" at Fort Ricketts, "D" at Fort Snyder, "E" and "K" at Fort Baker, "F" at Fort Carroll, "G" at Fort Dupont, "H" at Fort Wagner, "I" at Fort Stanton and "L" at Fort Davis. Mustered out September 2, 1862.

== Service ==
Garrison duty in Washington, D.C.

== Losses ==
The Regiment lost 4 soldiers by disease.

== See also ==
- List of Rhode Island Civil War units
