= Rhode Island in the American Civil War =

The state of Rhode Island during the American Civil War remained loyal to the Union, as did the other states of New England. Rhode Island furnished 25,236 fighting men to the Union Army, of which 1,685 died. The state used its industrial capacity to supply the Union Army with the materials needed to win the war. Rhode Island's continued growth and modernization led to the creation of an urban mass transit system and improved health and sanitation programs.

== Rhode Island during the war ==
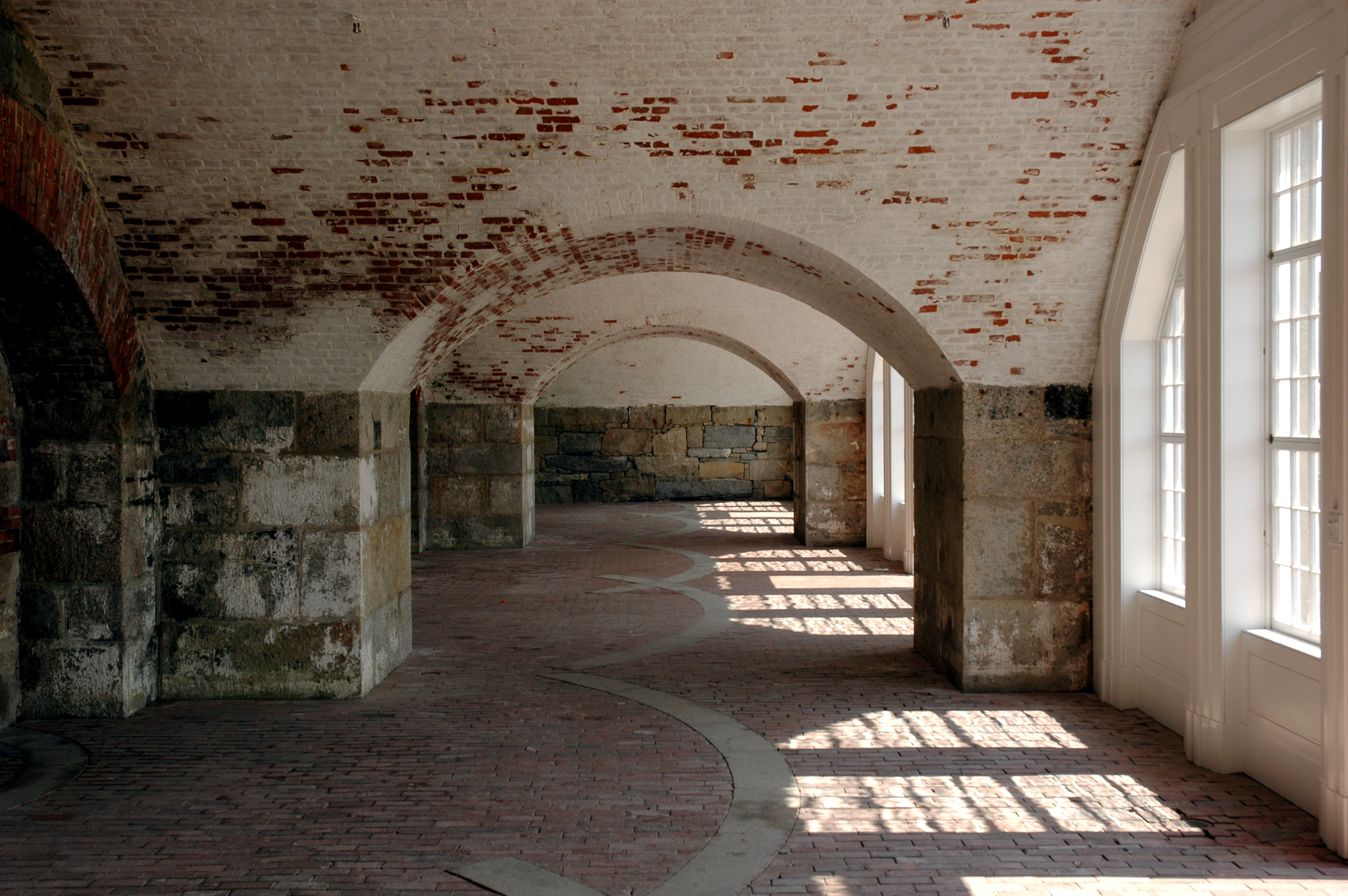
Fort Adams

Fort Adams near Newport was used temporarily as the United States Naval Academy. In May 1861, the Academy was moved to Newport from Annapolis, Maryland due to concerns about the political sympathies of the Marylanders, many of whom were suspected of supporting the Confederate States of America. In September, the Academy moved to the Atlantic House hotel in Newport and remained there for the rest of the war.

In 1862, Fort Adams became the headquarters and recruit depot for the 15th U.S. Infantry Regiment. The USS Rhode Island was a side-wheel steamer commissioned in 1861 for the Union Navy, and it intercepted blockade runners in the West Indies and was a part of the South Atlantic Blockading Squadron.

== Notable leaders from Rhode Island ==
=== Politics ===
Senator Henry B. Anthony was born in Coventry, Rhode Island. He was a powerful newspaper owner and staunch advocate of the policies of President Lincoln during the Civil War. Rhode Island Senator Samuel G. Arnold of Providence was also a Republican; he served in the Union Army until 1862, when he was elected to fill the vacancy caused by the resignation of James F. Simmons.

Rhode Island Governor William Sprague IV accompanied troops in the First Battle of Bull Run on July 21, 1861, but he declined a commission as a brigadier general and remained in office. In 1862, he attended the War Governors' Conference in Altoona, Pennsylvania which backed Lincoln's Emancipation Proclamation and the Union war effort. He was not re-elected as governor, but he was elected as a Senator to replace Arnold; he took office in 1863 and served into Reconstruction. William C. Cozzens became Governor in 1863; he was succeeded by James Y. Smith who led Rhode Island during the last two years of the war.

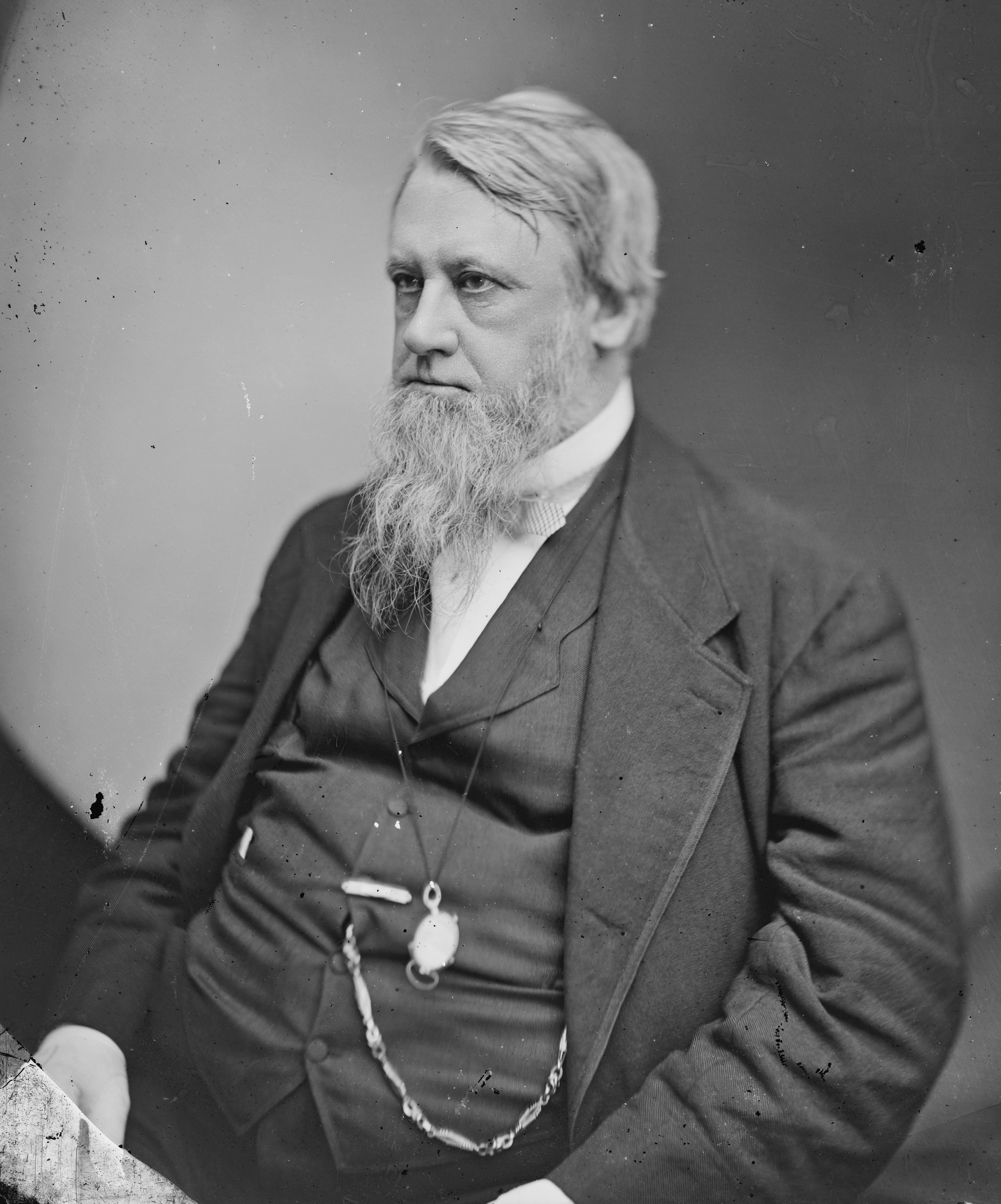
Senator Henry B. Anthony

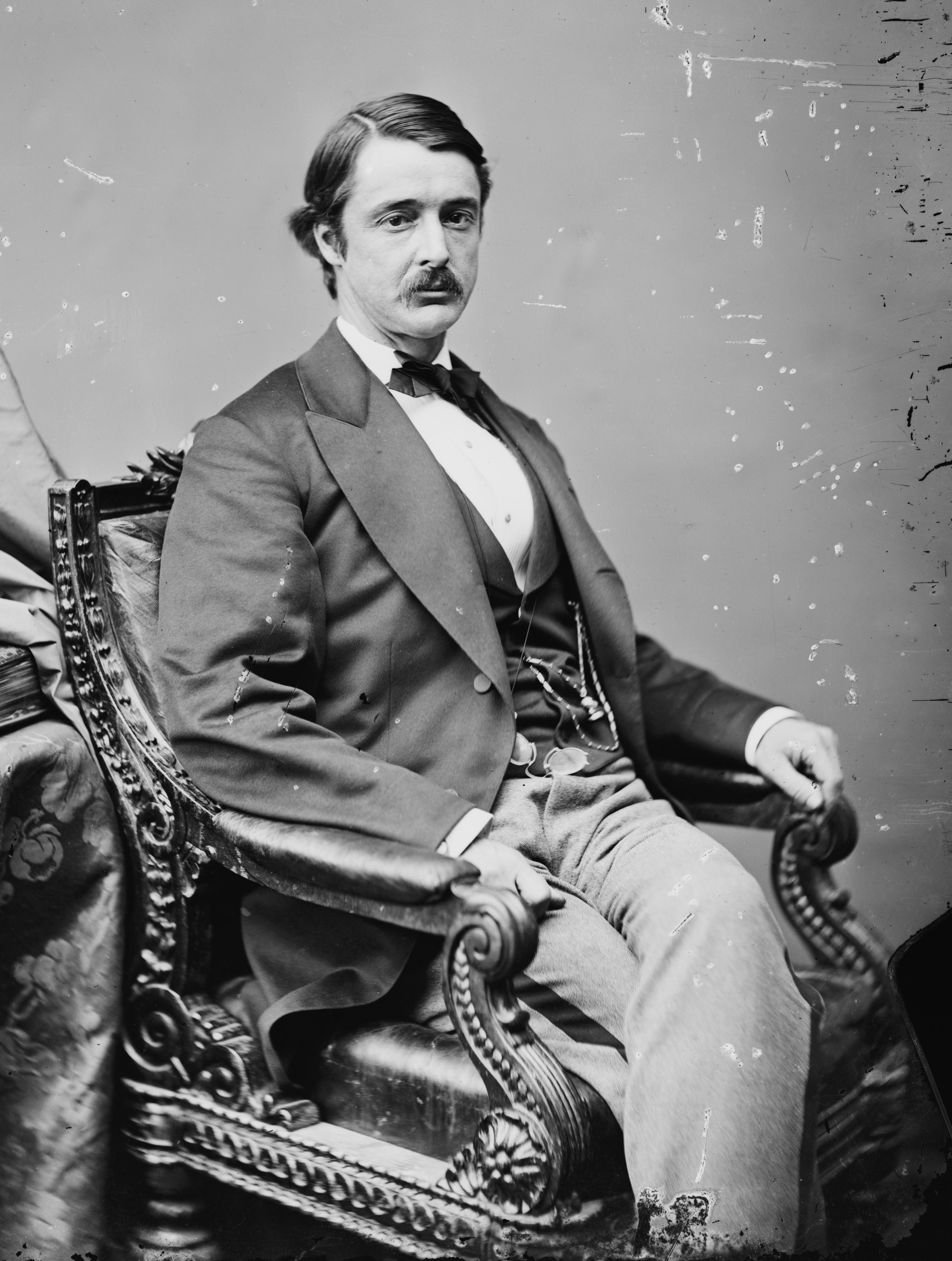
Governor William Sprague IV

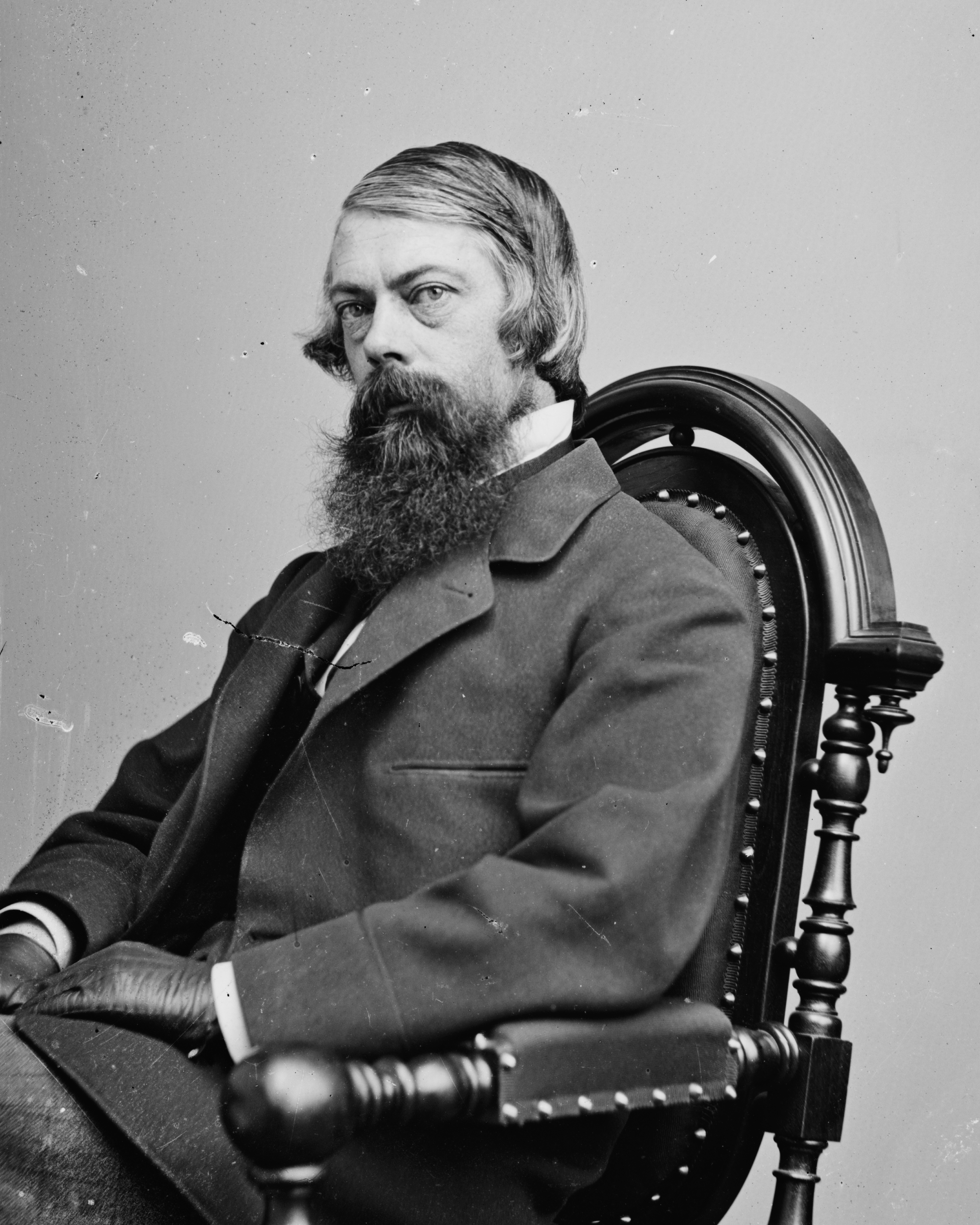
Senator Samuel G. Arnold

=== Military ===
Ambrose Burnside was an arms manufacturer, politician, and general in the Rhode Island state militia and was an influential army officer. He rose to command of the Army of the Potomac before his disastrous defeat at the Battle of Fredericksburg in December 1862. He later commanded the Department of the Ohio as well as the IX Corps. His field duty ended during the siege of Petersburg with the Battle of the Crater, another fiasco for which he took the blame.

Major General Silas Casey of East Greenwich, Rhode Island led a division in the Army of the Potomac during the 1862 Peninsula Campaign that suffered heavy losses at the Battle of Seven Pines facing George Pickett's brigade. He wrote the three-volume System of Infantry Tactics published in August 1862, and Infantry Tactics for Colored Troops published in March 1863. These manuals were used by both sides during the Civil War.

Isaac P. Rodman commanded the 3rd Division of the IX Corps during the Maryland Campaign. He led the efforts to take Turner's Gap during the Battle of South Mountain in September 1862. A few days later, he was mortally wounded at the Battle of Antietam. Brigadier General Richard Arnold was the son of Rhode Island Governor Lemuel Arnold and the Chief of Artillery for the Army of the Gulf. His guns helped force the surrender of Mobile, Alabama and Port Hudson, Louisiana.

Zenas Bliss of Johnston, Rhode Island led an infantry brigade in the IX Corps during the siege of Petersburg. After the war, he received the Medal of Honor for gallantry at Fredericksburg. George S. Greene of Apponaug, Rhode Island spearheaded the defense of the Union right flank at Culp's Hill during the Battle of Gettysburg in July 1863. At the very end of the war, he was in command of the 3rd Brigade in Absalom Baird's 3rd Division, XIV Corps, and participated in the capture of Raleigh, North Carolina and the pursuit of General Joseph E. Johnston's army until its surrender.

Brigadier General Thomas W. Sherman of Newport, Rhode Island commanded the defenses of New Orleans, Louisiana before taking command of a division in Major General Nathaniel P. Banks's army, which he led into action at the siege of Port Hudson. He lost a leg during this combat and was consigned to desk duty for the rest of the war. Frank Wheaton of Providence led a brigade and then a division in the Army of the Potomac, seeing action in the Overland Campaign and the siege of Petersburg. His men were hurried by train to Washington, D.C. in time to help repel Jubal Early's raid on the capital in the summer of 1864.

William Rogers Taylor was Fleet Captain of the South Atlantic Blockading Squadron in 1863. He participated in attacks on the Confederate fortifications protecting Charleston, South Carolina. He then commanded the steam sloop Juniata during 1864-65 and took part in the operations that led to the capture of Fort Fisher, North Carolina.

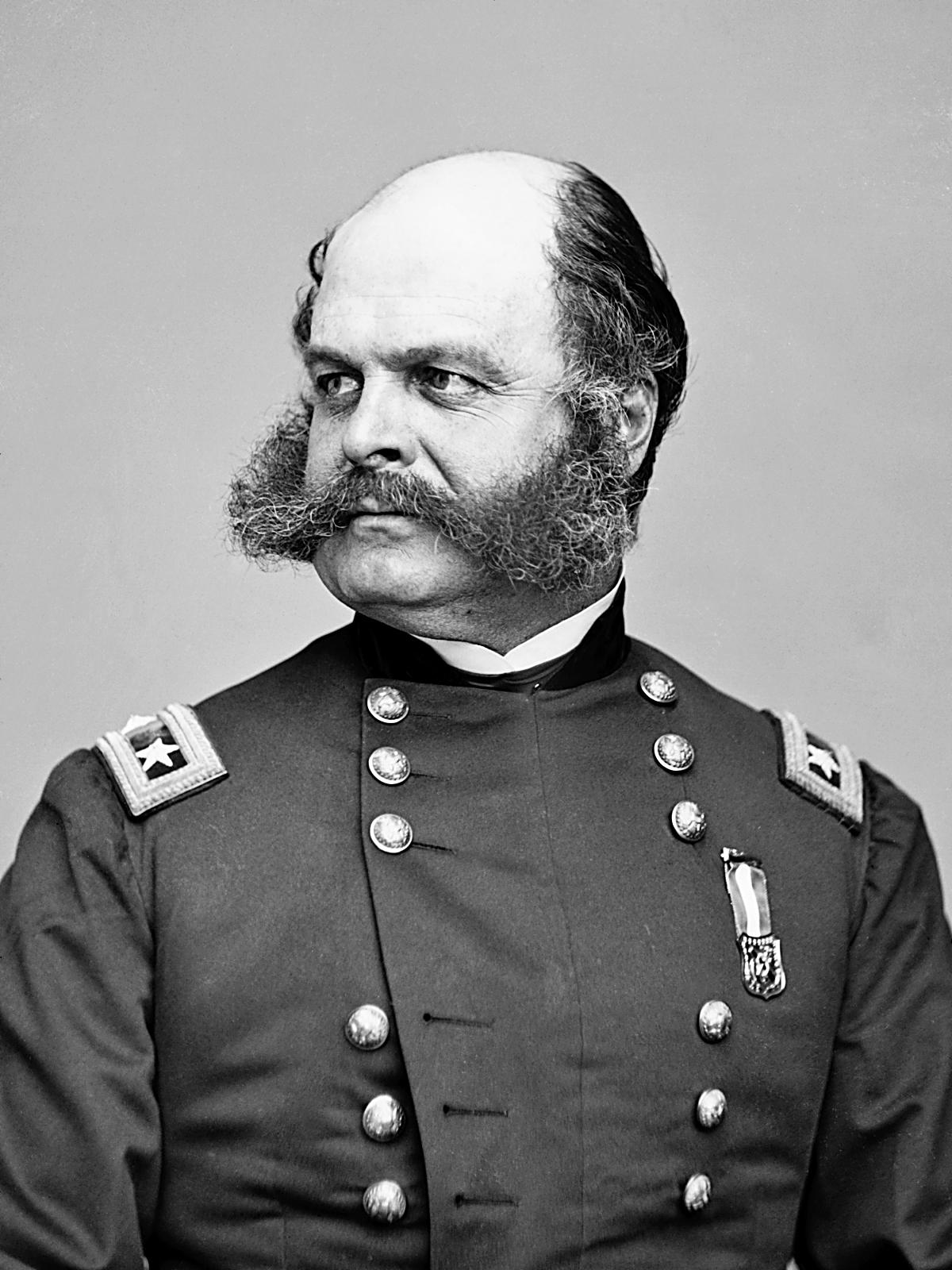
Ambrose Burnside

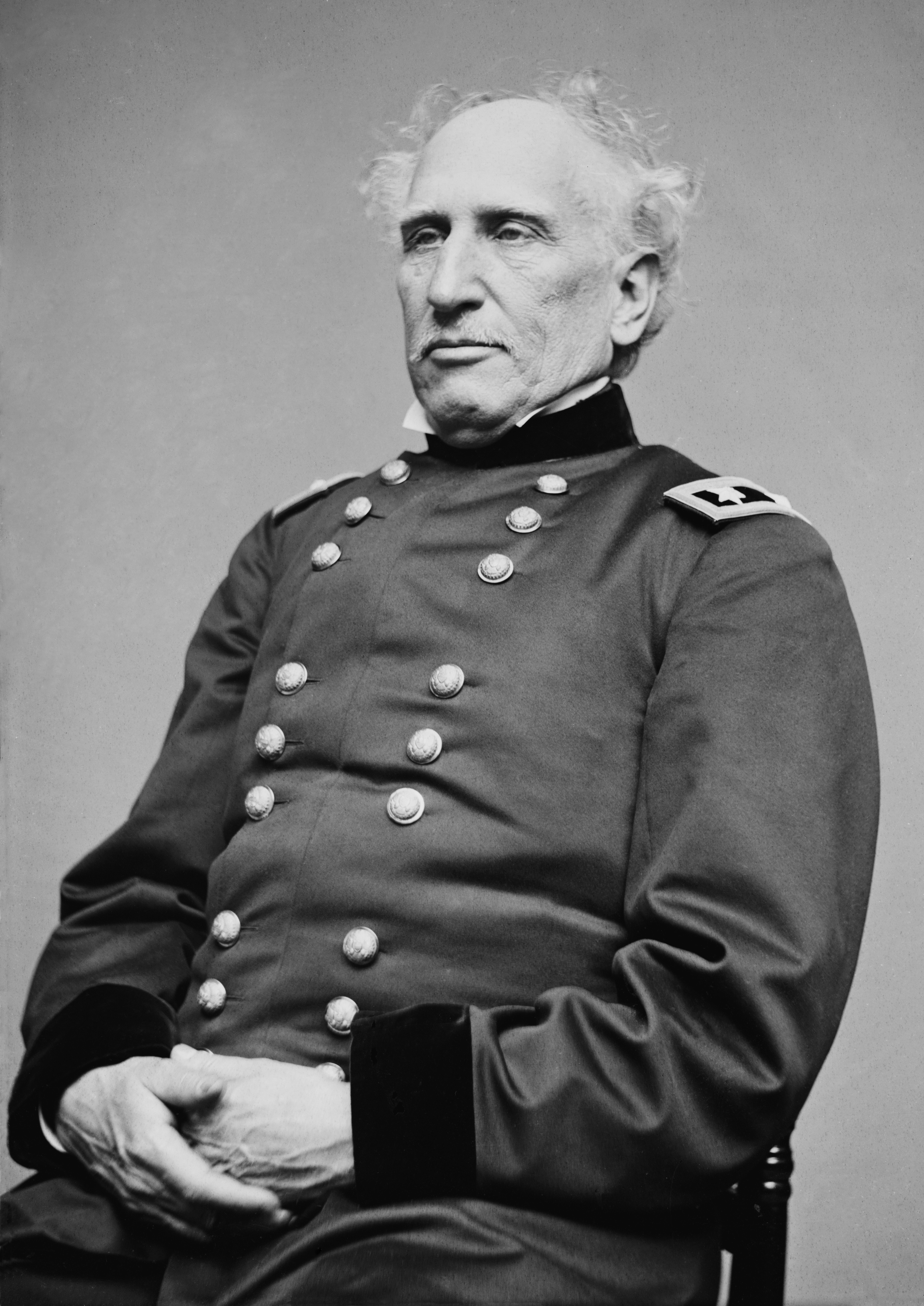
Major General Silas Casey

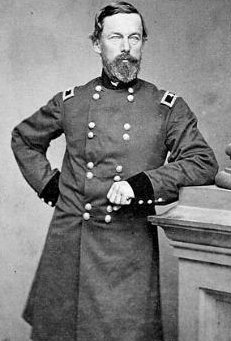
Isaac P. Rodman

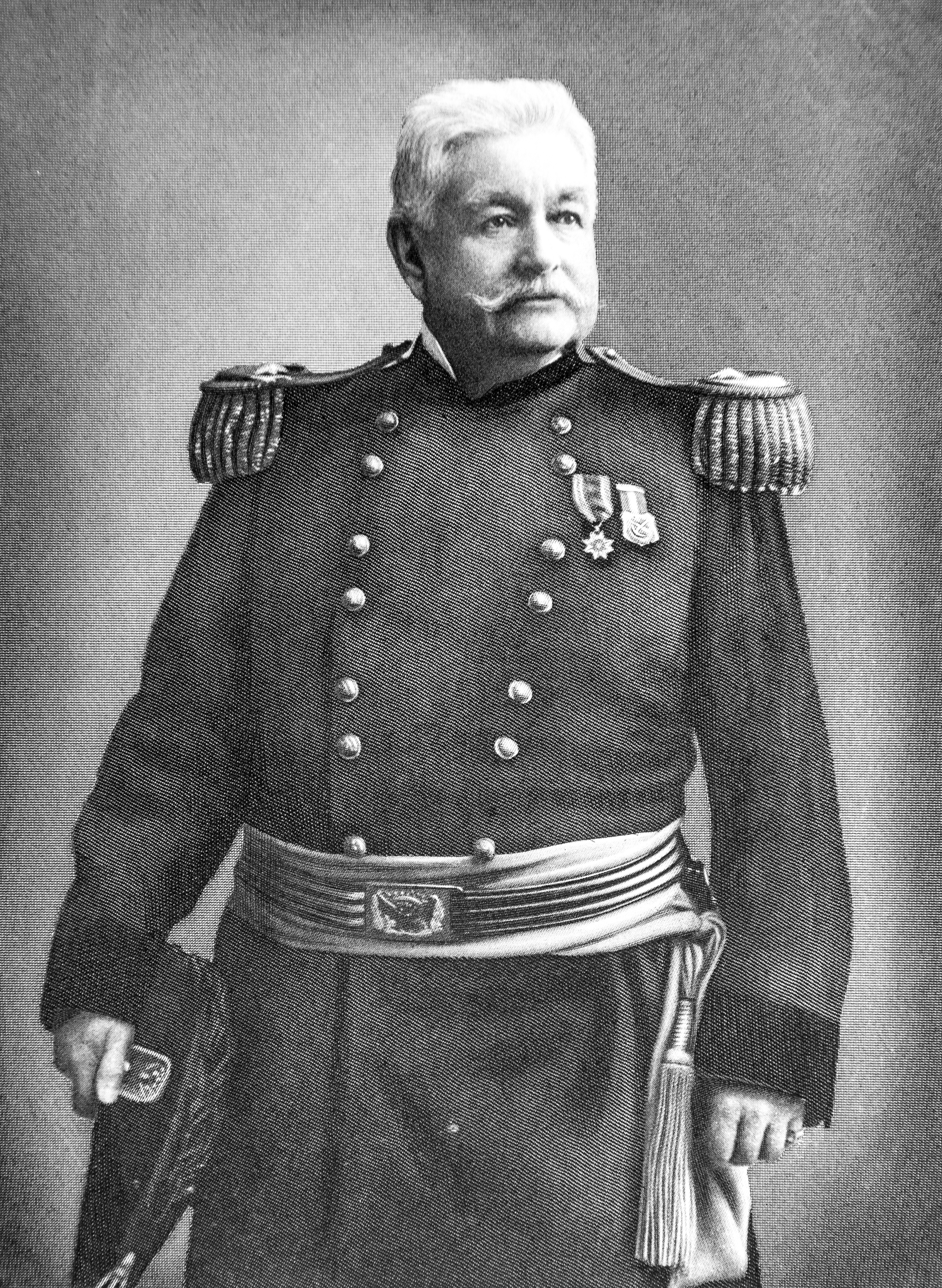
Zenas Bliss

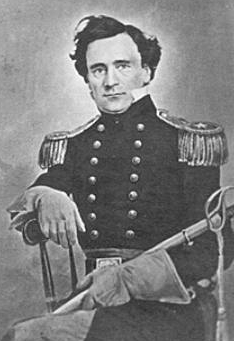
Thomas W. Sherman

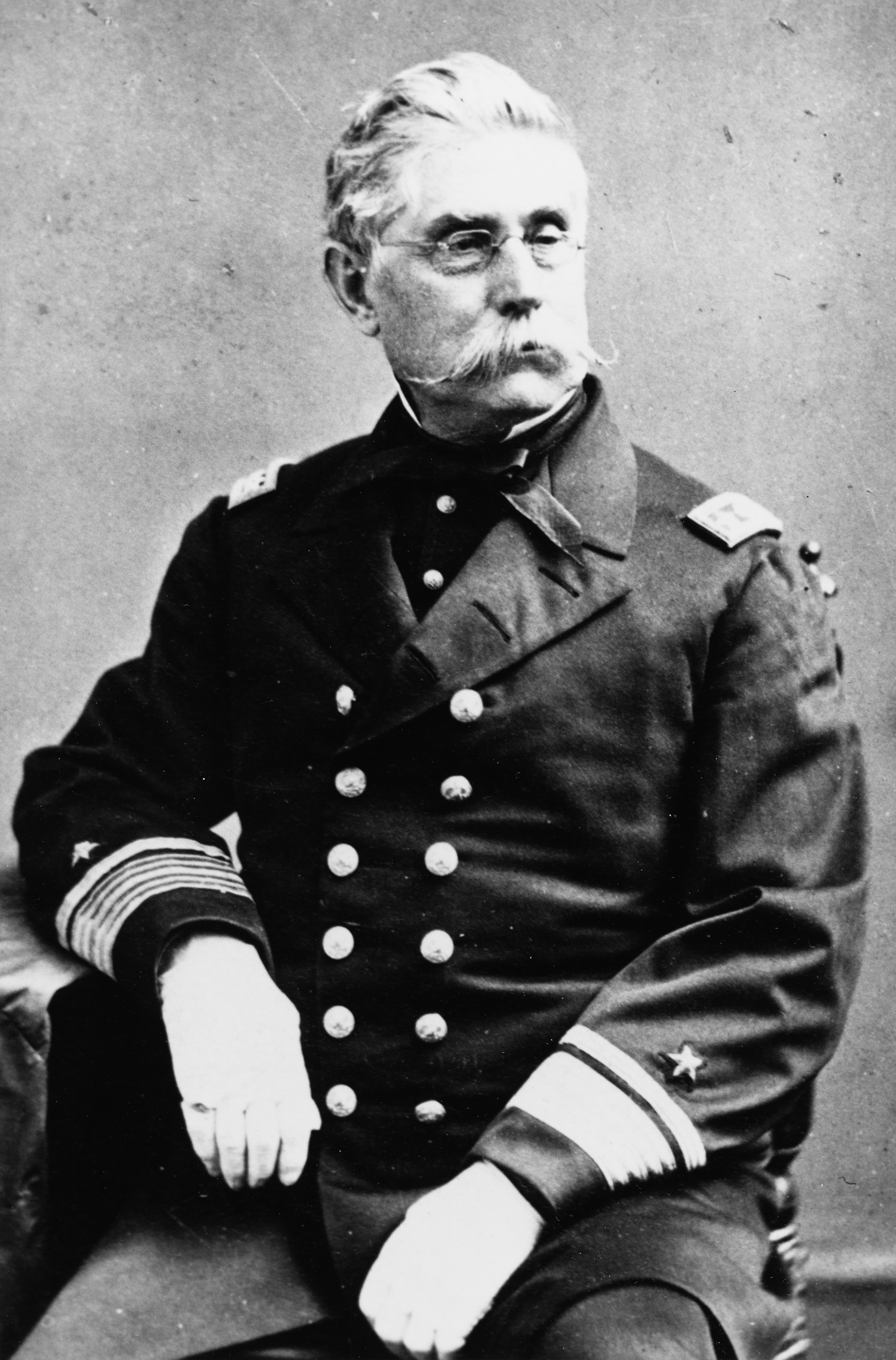
William Rogers Taylor

== See also ==
- List of Rhode Island Civil War units
- History of Rhode Island
- Category:People of Rhode Island in the American Civil War
- US Naval Academy in the Civil War
