= Aviation in Rhode Island =

- Aviation in the United States
- Rhode Island State Flag

Airports
- Commercial – primary: 1
- Commercial – non-primary: 2
- General aviation: 1
- Other public-use airports: 1
- Military and other airports: 0

First flight
- 1856 - Balloon

Aviation in Rhode Island is the aeronautical history of that American New England state.

Rhode Island's first aeronautical event was a flight by James Allen in 1856 in a hot air balloon.

== Events ==
- 1896, Edson Fessenden Gallaudet demonstrated a wing warping glider four years before the Wright Brothers. The glider is on display at the Smithsonian Air and Space Museum.
- 1916, Providence born pilot, Godfrey DeCourcelles Chevalier participates in the first production catapult launches.

== Aircraft Manufacturers ==
- Gallaudet Aircraft Company (–1923), Merged with Consolidated Aircraft in 1923.
- Textron, Providence, Rhode Island, (1923–) is a conglomerate that includes Bell Helicopter, E-Z-GO, Cessna Aircraft Company, and Greenlee, among others.

== Airports ==
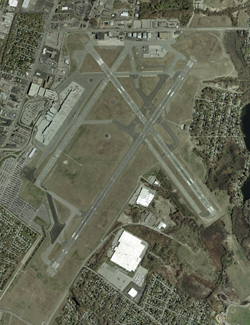
T.F. Green Airport

- T. F. Green Airport has nearly four million passenger movements per year.
- List of Airports in Rhode Island

== Commercial Service ==
- New England Airlines provides regional air service.

== Organizations ==
- Rhode Island Pilots Association - is headquartered in Warwick, Rhode Island.

== Government and Military ==
- All flight operations in Rhode Island are conducted within FAA oversight.
- The Rhode Island Air National Guard was founded 1915 operating two Curtiss flying boats.
- Former Governor Bruce Sundlun served as a Boeing B-17 gunner in World War II. Later becoming a partner in Executive Jet Aviation.
- The Rhode Island Airport Corporation operates a Bell 407 Helicopter in support of all state agencies.
- The Rhode Island Airport Corporation enforces the provisions of the Uniform Aeronautical Regulatory Act (UAR).

== Museums ==
- Quonset Air Museum
- Rhode Island Aviation Hall of Fame is managing the John F. Kennedy Aircraft Carrier Project.
