= Thomas J. Haynes =

United States Air Force general

Thomas J. Haynes is a major general in the Rhode Island Air National Guard.

== Career ==
Haynes was commissioned an officer in the United States Air Force in 1971. In 1972, he was assigned to the 55th Weather Reconnaissance Squadron at McClellan Air Force Base. He remained there until 1975, when he was transferred to the 54th Weather Reconnaissance Squadron at Andersen Air Force Base. Haynes was stationed at Lowry Air Force Base from 1978 until 1980, when he transferred to the Rhode Island Air National Guard and was assigned to the 143d Airlift Wing. From 1982 to 1993, he served with the 143rd Airlift Squadron. During that time, he was deployed to serve in the Gulf War. Haynes eventually assumed command of the 143rd Wing in 2000. Later, he was deployed to serve in the war on terror. From 2006 to 2008, Haynes served as Air National Guard Advisor to Plans and Programs of Air Mobility Command. Also during that time, Haynes was Assistant Adjutant General for Air of the Rhode Island National Guard. In 2008, Haynes was named Air National Guard Assistant to the Commander of Air Mobility Command.

Awards he has received include the Legion of Merit, the Meritorious Service Medal with two oak leaf clusters, the Air Force Achievement Medal with oak leaf cluster, the Air Force Commendation Medal with two oak leaf clusters, the Air Force Achievement Medal with two oak leaf clusters, the Outstanding Unit Award, the Combat Readiness Medal with two oak leaf clusters, the National Defense Service Medal with two service stars, the Southwest Asia Service Medal, the Global War on Terrorism Expeditionary Medal, the Global War on Terrorism Service Medal, the Air Force Overseas Short Tour Service Ribbon with oak leaf cluster, the Air Force Expeditionary Service Ribbon with gold frame, the Air Force Longevity Service Award with silver oak leaf cluster, the Armed Forces Reserve Medal with silver hourglass device, mobilization device and award numeral "2"; the Small Arms Marksmanship Ribbon with service star and the Air Force Training Ribbon.

== Education ==
- San Diego State University
- University of Oklahoma
- Air War College
