= Richmond Airport =

Richmond Airport may refer to:

== Australia ==
- Richmond Airport (Queensland) in Richmond, Queensland (IATA: RCM)
- RAAF Base Richmond in New South Wales (IATA: XRH – ICAO: YSRI)

== United States ==
- Richmond Airport (Rhode Island) in Richmond, Rhode Island (FAA: 08R)
- Richmond Field in Gregory, Michigan (FAA: 69G)
- Richmond International Airport in Richmond, Virginia (FAA/IATA: RIC)
- Richmond Municipal Airport in Richmond, Indiana (FAA/IATA: RID)

== See also ==
- Vancouver International Airport in Richmond, British Columbia (IATA/TC: YVR)
