= KSFZ =

KSFZ may refer to:

- North Central State Airport (ICAO code KSFZ)
- KSFZ-LD, a low-power television station (channel 29, virtual 41) licensed to serve Springfield, Missouri, United States
