= General Haynes =

General Haynes may refer to:

- Caleb V. Haynes (1895–1966), U.S. Air Force major general
- Fred E. Haynes Jr. (1921–2010), U.S. Marine Corps major general
- Hezekiah Haynes (died 1693), English Civil War major general
- Ira Allen Haynes (1859–1955), U.S. Army brigadier general
- Loyal M. Haynes (fl. 1940s–1950s), U.S. Army brigadier general
- Thomas J. Haynes (fl. 1970s–2000s), Rhode Island Air National Guard major general
