= 143rd Airlift Squadron =

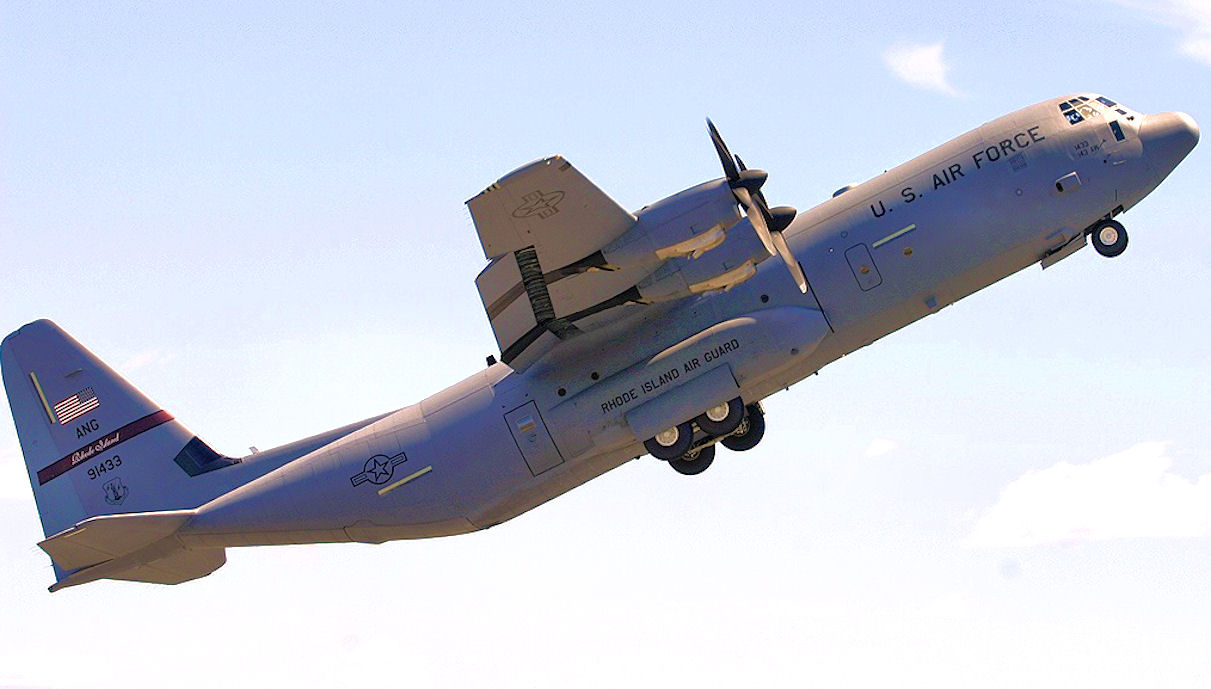
- 143rd Airlift Squadron C-130J
- Active: 1939–1945; 1948–1956; 1956–present
- Country: United States
- Branch: Air National Guard
- Part of: Rhode Island Air National Guard
- Garrison/HQ: Quonset Point Air National Guard Station, Rhode Island
- Engagements: Mediterranean Theater of Operations

Insignia
- 143rd Airlift Squadron emblem

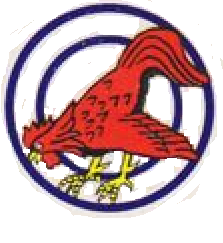
- 152nd Observation Squadron emblem

- Tail stripe

The 143rd Airlift Squadron is a unit of the 143rd Airlift Wing, Rhode Island Air National Guard located at Quonset Point Air National Guard Station, Rhode Island. The 143rd is equipped with the Lockheed Martin C-130J Super Hercules.

The squadron descends from the 152nd Observation Squadron, established on 21 August 1939. It is one of the 29 original National Guard Observation Squadrons of the United States Army National Guard formed before World War II.

== History ==
The origins of the squadron begin in 1915 when concerned Rhode Island residents banded together to purchase two Curtis Model "F" Flying Boats, one of which was assigned to the Rhode Island National Guard. The border conflict in Mexico and America's entry into the First World War prevented much use, and in 1919 the National Guard aircraft, now obsolete, was sold as surplus.

=== World War II ===
In 1939 President Roosevelt increased measures to prepare the Armed Forces for American involvement in World War II. The State of Rhode Island was allocated one of two new observation squadrons authorized by Congress that year. On 21 August 1939 the 152nd Observation Squadron was organized. Less than one year later, on 25 November 1940 it was federalized for extended active duty. After American entry into World War II, the 152nd Squadron immediately took up its primary mission of antisubmarine patrols along the Northeastern shipping lanes. In September 1944 the unit, now designated the 37th Photographic Reconnaissance Squadron, transferred overseas. Assigned to Fifteenth Air Force, squadron pilots flew photographic reconnaissance missions in northern Italy, southern Germany and the Balkans until June 1945, following the end of the war in Europe on 8 May 1945.

=== Rhode Island Air National Guard ===
The 37th Photographic Reconnaissance Squadron was redesignated the 152nd Fighter Squadron, and was allotted to the National Guard on 24 May 1946. It was organized at T. F. Green Municipal Airport, Rhode Island and was extended federal recognition. The 152nd Fighter Squadron was equipped with F-47 Thunderbolts and was assigned to the Continental Air Command First Air Force.

==== Air defense ====
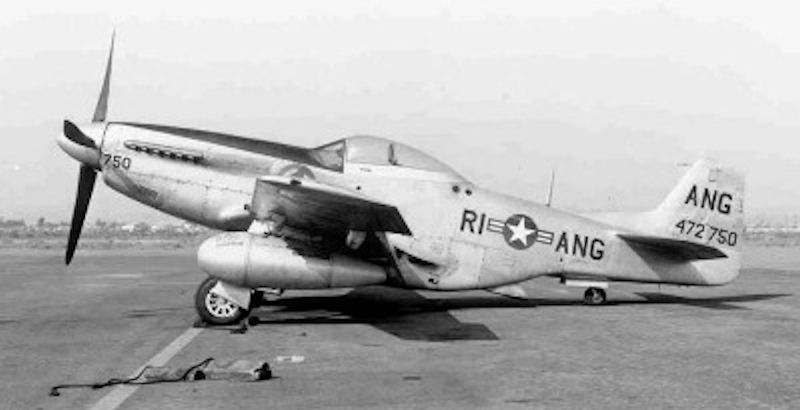
152nd Fighter-Interceptor Squadron F-51D Mustang (Note: Aircraft is North American F-51D Mustang, serial 44-72750, about 1954.)

In 1952 the 152nd was given a mission of air defense for Rhode Island, eastern Long Island and over the Atlantic approaches of New York City. In order to accomplish this, the unit was equipped with long-range F-51D Mustangs. In 1955 the Air Force, in an effort to upgrade to an all-jet fighter force, required Air National Guard air defense units to upgrade to jet-powered aircraft. The Rhode Island Airport Commission and National Guard authorities found themselves in a conflict over the use of T. F. Green Municipal Airport for tactical jet operations. Unable to resolve these differences the Air Force inactivated the squadron.

==== Special operations ====
However, the National Guard Bureau's desire to have an Air National Guard flying unit located in every state brought a new mission and the numeric designation to the Rhode Island Air National Guard, the 143rd Air Resupply Squadron using propeller-driven aircraft. The 143rd Air Resupply Squadron was bestowed the lineage and history of the 152nd Fighter-Interceptor Squadron.

The 143rd Air Resupply Squadron was assigned to the Military Air Transport Service. It was designated at the time as a psychological warfare unit which supported USAF unconventional warfare (guerrilla warfare), direct action (commando-type raids), and strategic reconnaissance (intelligence gathering) operations. The unit was equipped with Grumman SA-16 Albatross seaplane and for a short time retained the Douglas C-47 Skytrain. There were several minor mission designation changes, and the C-47 was eventually replaced by the Curtiss C-46 Commando.

In 1963 the first major mission change for the 143rd occurred. Situations around the world produced a need for specialized units which could insert a small group of trained combat troops on land or sea anywhere at a moments notice. The 143rd was tasked as one of the representatives of the National Guard in the Air Force's air commando group structure. The C-46 was replaced with Helio U-10A and U-10D Couriers. During a three-year period starting in 1965, the U-10s belonging to the 143rd and other Air National Guard units were transferred back to the Air Force for use in South Vietnam, during which the Courier was replaced by de Havilland Canada U-6 Beavers.

In 1968 the U-10s returned from their tour of duty in South Vietnam, and on 1 July, the Rhode Island Air National Guard was authorized to expand to a group level. The 143rd Special Operations Group was established, with the 143rd Squdron becoming the group's flying squadron. Other elements assigned into the group were the 143rd group headquarters, 143rd Material Squadron (maintenance and supplu), 143rd Combat Support Squadron, and the 143rd USAF Dispensary.

The Grumman SA-16 Albatross flown by 143rd pilots since 1955 was replaced in 1968 with an updated version of the Albatross, the HU-16. With twice the cargo capability and range, the HU-16 opened up new avenues of opportunity as was demonstrated in 1970. Flight and Ground crews of the 143rd assisted scientists and engineers of the Naval Underwater Systems Center, conducting studies of undersea acoustics, at Lake Tanganyika in Africa during April and again in August at Hudson Bay, Canada.

The unit would work in the Special Operations field for seven more years, during which the HU-16 aircraft were eventually retired in 1972 and replaced with Fairchild C-119G/L Flying Boxcars.

==== Tactical airlift ====
In 1975 as part of a general program to upgrade Air National Guard units the 143rd was redesignated as the 143rd Tactical Airlift Squadron and assigned Lockheed C-130A Hercules aircraft. In 1980 the 143rd Squadron moved from T.F. Green airport to its new home at Quonset Air National Guard Base.

As global airlifters, Rhode Island "Herks" were found in all parts of the United States, Europe, Africa, South America and the Caribbean. The 143rd deploymented for operations such as Volant Oak, Volant Pine, Red Flag, Dragon Hammer, Volant Rodeo competitions and humanitarian efforts such as "Operation Toy Lift" which provided toys to the children of Granada in 1986. In 1989, the 143rd was selected for conversion to the C-130E Model.

In 1990 unit volunteers provided support during Operation Desert Shield. In September, unit members flew out of Rhein-Main Air Base, Germany to support operational missions from Turkey and Saudi Arabia. The second group of volunteers arrived at RAF Mildenhall, England in January 1991 and was in the theater of operations when Operation Desert Shield turned into Operation Desert Storm. With the defeat of the Iraqi forces and the end of the Gulf War, members returned home in June 1991 and were released from active duty.

As part of Air Mobility Command the unit continued to be called upon to support State, Federal, and United Nations activities throughout the world. Volunteers from the 143rd participated in many UN relief missions; Somalia in 1992, Operation Provide Promise in 1993 flying daylight air-land missions into Sarajevo along with night airdrops over remote areas of Bosnia-Herzegovina.

On 1 October 1995 the group was elevated to Wing status. In 1998 the Air Force formed the Air Expeditionary Force (AEF); smaller sized war fighting "packages" able to rapidly respond to regional conflicts. The Wing has participated in five AEF cycles, supporting Operation Joint Forge in the Balkans, Operation Southern Watch in Southwest Asia and Coronet Oak in South America.

==== Twenty-first century ====
On 11 September 2001, the 143rd responded to the call again, deploying unit members to Ground Zero, to US bases for homeland security and implemented 24-hour operations at Quonset. The squadron supported the War in Afghanistan (2001-2021) and the War in Iraq both by transporting troops and supplies from the U.S. to the Middle East and also moving forces within the theater. The 143rd AW provided the first-ever C-130J Aircraft in a combat role by the U.S. Air Force in December 2004 and continued to support the war effort with both the C-130E and C-130J until retiring the C-130E in 2005. The 143rd AW also provided and continues to provide the much needed troop support within Southwest Asia and many other areas of the world.

In December 2001, the 143rd received its first C-130J-30. The Wing became the first in the Air Force to receive the "stretch" version of the "J" model. As the most modern tactical airlifter in the world, the C-130J-30 can carry more cargo or personnel farther, faster, and more economically than the C-130E proving its increased airlift capability. The fleet for the 143rd was completed with the arrival of the eighth J-model at Quonset on 15 June 2007.

== Lineage ==
- Designated as the 152nd Observation Squadron and allotted to the National Guard on 21 August 1939

Activated on 13 October 1939.
Ordered to active service on 25 November 1940
Redesignated 152nd Observation Squadron (Medium) on 13 January 1942
Redesignated 152nd Observation Squadron on 4 July 1942
Redesignated 152nd Reconnaissance Squadron (Bombardment) on 2 April 1943
Redesignated 152nd Reconnaissance Squadron (Fighter) on 15 June 1943
Redesignated 152nd Tactical Reconnaissance Squadron on 11 August 1943
Redesignated 37th Photographic Mapping Squadron on 9 October 1943
Redesignated 37th Photographic Reconnaissance Squadron on 29 March 1944
Inactivated on 6 November 1945
Redesignated 152nd Fighter Squadron, Single Engine and allotted to the National Guard on 24 May 1946
Redesignated 152nd Fighter-Bomber Squadron and received federal recognition on 1 September 1948
Redesignated 152nd Fighter-Interceptor Squadron on 1 September 1952
Inactivated on 19 November 1955

- Redesignated 143rd Air Resupply Squadron and activated on 1 November 1956

Redesignated 143rd Air Commando Squadron on 1 July 1963
Redesignated 143rd Special Operations Squadron on 1 July 1968
Redesignated 143rd Tactical Airlift Squadron on 1 October 1975
Redesignated 143rd Airlift Squadron on 16 March 1992

=== Assignments ===
- Rhode Island National Guard, 13 October 1939
- First Corps Area, 25 November 1940
- VI Army Corps, 30 December 1940
- 26th Observation Group (later 26th Observation Group, 1 September 1941
- 73rd Reconnaissance Group (later 73rd Tactical Reconnaissance Group), 27 June 1943
- 69th Tactical Reconnaissance Group, 9 October 1943
- II Tactical Air Division, 29 March 1944
- I Tactical Air Division (later III Tactical Air Division), 12 April 1944
- 5th Photographic Group (later 5th Reconnaissance Group), 15 November 1944 – 28 October 1945
- 103d Fighter Group, 15 September 1948
- 102nd Fighter Group, 1 February 1951
- Rhode Island Air National Guard, 1 September 1951
- 102nd Fighter-Interceptor Group, 1 September 1952
- 103rd Fighter-Bomber Group (later 103rd Fighter-Interceptor Group) 1 March 1953 – 19 November 1955
- Rhode Island Air National Guard, 1 November 1956
- 143rd Air Commando Group (later 143rd Special Operations Group, 143rd Tactical Airlift Group), 1 July 1963
- 143rd Operations Group, 1 October 1995 – present

=== Stations ===
- Hillsgrove Army Airfield, Rhode Island, 13 October 1939
- Fort Devens Airfield, Massachusetts, 31 July 1941
- Reading Army Air Field, Pennsylvania, 8 June 1943
- Camp Campbell Army Air Field, Kentucky, 27 June 1943
- Esler Field, Louisiana, 20 November 1943
- Muskogee Army Air Field, Oklahoma, 12 Apr – 3 October 1943
- Capodichino Airport, Naples, Italy, 18 November 1944
- San Severo Airfield, Italy, 12 December 1944
- Bari Airfield, Italy, 8 August 1945
- Capodichino Airport, Naples, Italy, 17 Sep – 18 October 1945
- Camp Patrick Henry, Virginia, 6 November 1945
- T.F. Green Municipal Airport, Rhode Island, 1 September 1948 – 19 November 1955
- T.F. Green Municipal Airport, Rhode Island, 1 November 1956
- Quonset State Airport (later Quonset Point Air National Guard Station), Rhode Island, 1 October 1980 – present.

=== Aircraft ===
- Douglas O-38, 1939–1941
- O-47, 1939–1942
- O-52 Owl, 1941–1943
- Douglas O-46, 1941–1943
- Stinson O-49, 1941–1943
- Aeronca O-58, 1941–1943
- O-59, 1941–1943
- A-20 Havoc, 1943–1944
- B-25 Mitchell, 1943–1944
- P-39 Airacobra, 1943–1944
- F-5 Lightning, 1944–1945
- F-47 Thunderbolt, 1948–1952
- F-51 Mustang, 1952–1956
- SA-16 Albatross (SA-16A variant), 1956–1968
- C-47 Skytrain, 1956–1957
- C-46 Commando, 1957–1963
- U-10D Super Courier, 1963–1965; 1968–1975
- U-6 Beaver, 1965–1968
- HU-16 Albatross, 1968–1972
- C-119 Flying Boxcar, 1972–1975
- C-130A Hercules, 1975–1989
- C-130E Hercules, 1989–2005
- C-130J Hercules, 2004–Present

== See also ==
- List of observation squadrons of the United States Army National Guard
