= Westerly State Airport =

Airport in Rhode Island, United States

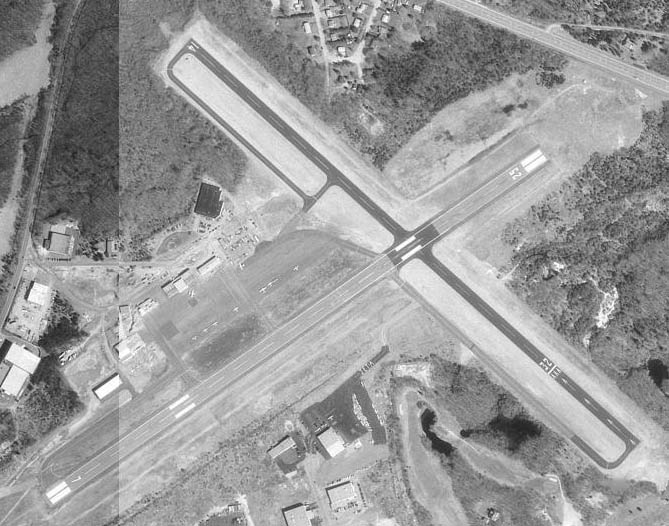
- USGS aerial image, April 2001
- IATA: WST; ICAO: KWST; FAA LID: WST

Summary
- Airport type: Public
- Owner/Operator: Rhode Island Airport Corp.
- Serves: Westerly, Rhode Island
- Elevation AMSL: 81 ft / 25 m
- Coordinates: 41°20′59″N 071°48′12″W
- Website: flywesterlyairport.com

Map
- Interactive map of Westerly State Airport

Runways
Direction	Length		Surface
Direction	ft	m	Surface
7/25	4,010	1,222	Asphalt
14/32	3,960	1,207	Asphalt

Statistics (2020)
- Aircraft operations (year ending 2/13/2020): 18,617
- Based aircraft: 29
- Source: Federal Aviation Administration

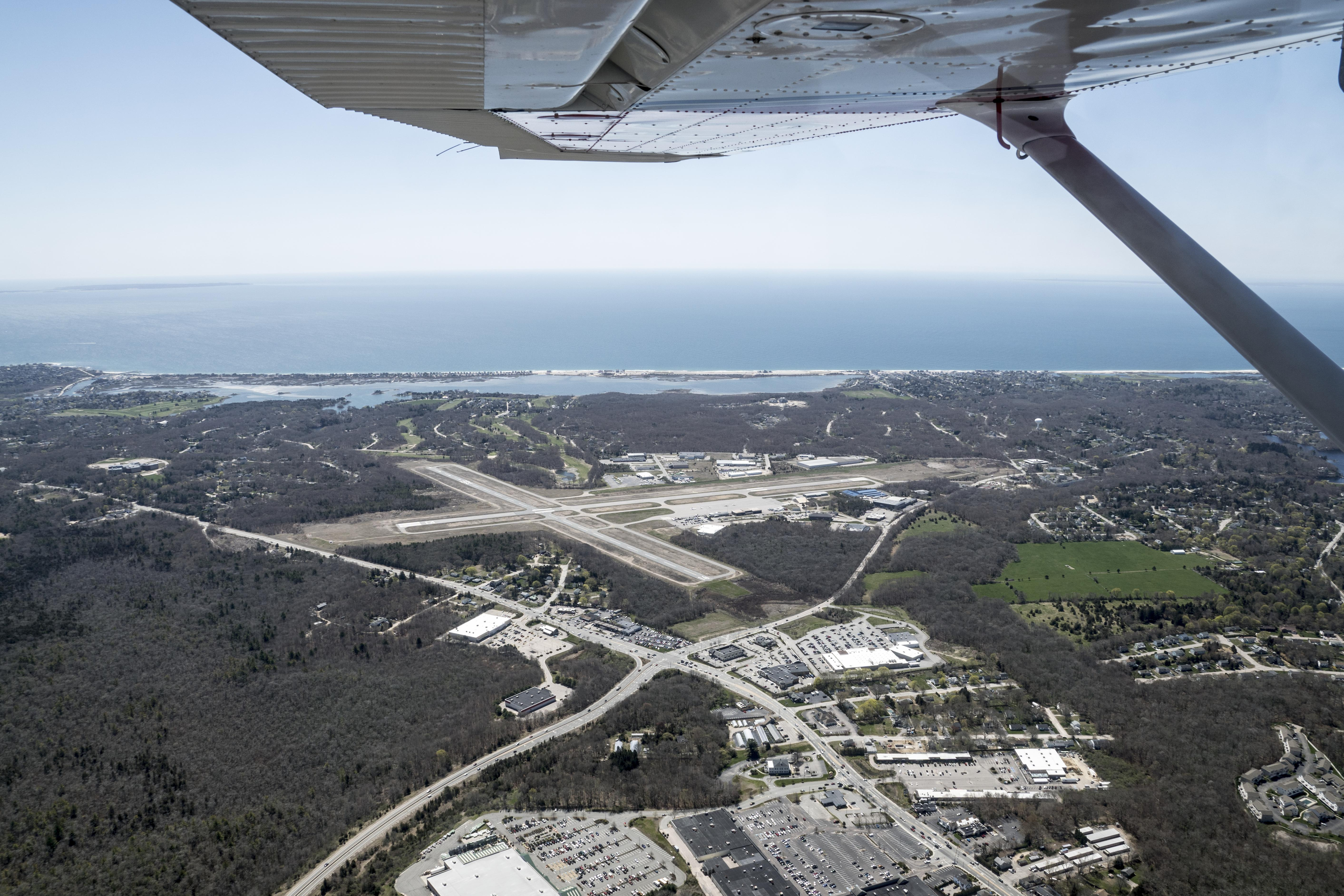
Aerial view (April 2016)

Westerly State Airport (IATA: WST, ICAO: KWST, FAA LID: WST) is a public use airport in Washington County, Rhode Island, United States. It serves the town of Westerly and is located 2 nmi (2.3 mi; 3.7 km) southeast of its central business district. It is primarily a general aviation airport, but there is also scheduled airline service to Block Island provided by New England Airlines.

As per Federal Aviation Administration records, the airport had 11,201 passenger boardings (enplanements) in calendar year 2008, 8,804 enplanements in 2009, and 11,402 in 2010. It is included in the Federal Aviation Administration (FAA) National Plan of Integrated Airport Systems for 2023–2027 in which it is categorized as a non-hub primary commercial service facility.

Westerly State Airport is one of six active airports operated by the Rhode Island Airport Corporation. The other five airports include T.F. Green State Airport, Newport State Airport, North Central State Airport, Quonset State Airport, and Block Island State Airport.

== History ==
Westerly State began as a grass strip in the 1920s, and became the second state-owned airport in the United States (after T.F. Green Airport) in the 1940s. The airport was paved and expanded when it became a U.S. Navy base during World War II, due to its prime location halfway between Boston and New York City.

== Facilities and aircraft ==
Westerly State Airport covers an area of 321 acres (130 ha; 1.30 km^{2}) at an elevation of 81 ft (25 m) above mean sea level.

It has two runways with asphalt surfaces:

- Runway 7/25 is 4,010 by 100 ft (1,222 by 30 m)
- Runway 14/32 is 3,960 by 75 ft (1,207 by 23 m)

In 2005, $3,400,000 (equivalent to $5,604,873 in 2025) in federal funding was allocated to repair and improve the main runway and taxiways. As of November 2006, improvements were finished and the main runway is open.

For the 12-month period ending February 13, 2020, the airport had 18,617 aircraft operations, an average of 51 per day: 54% general aviation, 46% air taxi, and <1% military. At that time there were 29 aircraft based at this airport: 25 single-engine, 3 multi-engine, and 1 helicopter.

== Airlines and destinations ==
=== Passenger ===
Airlines	Destinations	Refs
Fly The Whale	Block Island	
New England Airlines	Block Island	

== Accidents at or near WST ==
- On September 5, 1999, a New England Airlines Piper PA-32 Cherokee Six crashed after takeoff from Westerly into an open field beyond the departure end of the runway when the pilot lost control of the aircraft and stalled during a turn. There were 3 fatalities out of the 5 occupants on board.
- On May 18, 2026, a Cessna 172 crashed while attempting to land at the airport. The pilot and sole occupant of the aircraft was fatally injured.

== See also ==
- List of airports in Rhode Island
- New England Airlines
