= Newport State Airport (Rhode Island) =

Public airport in Rhode Island

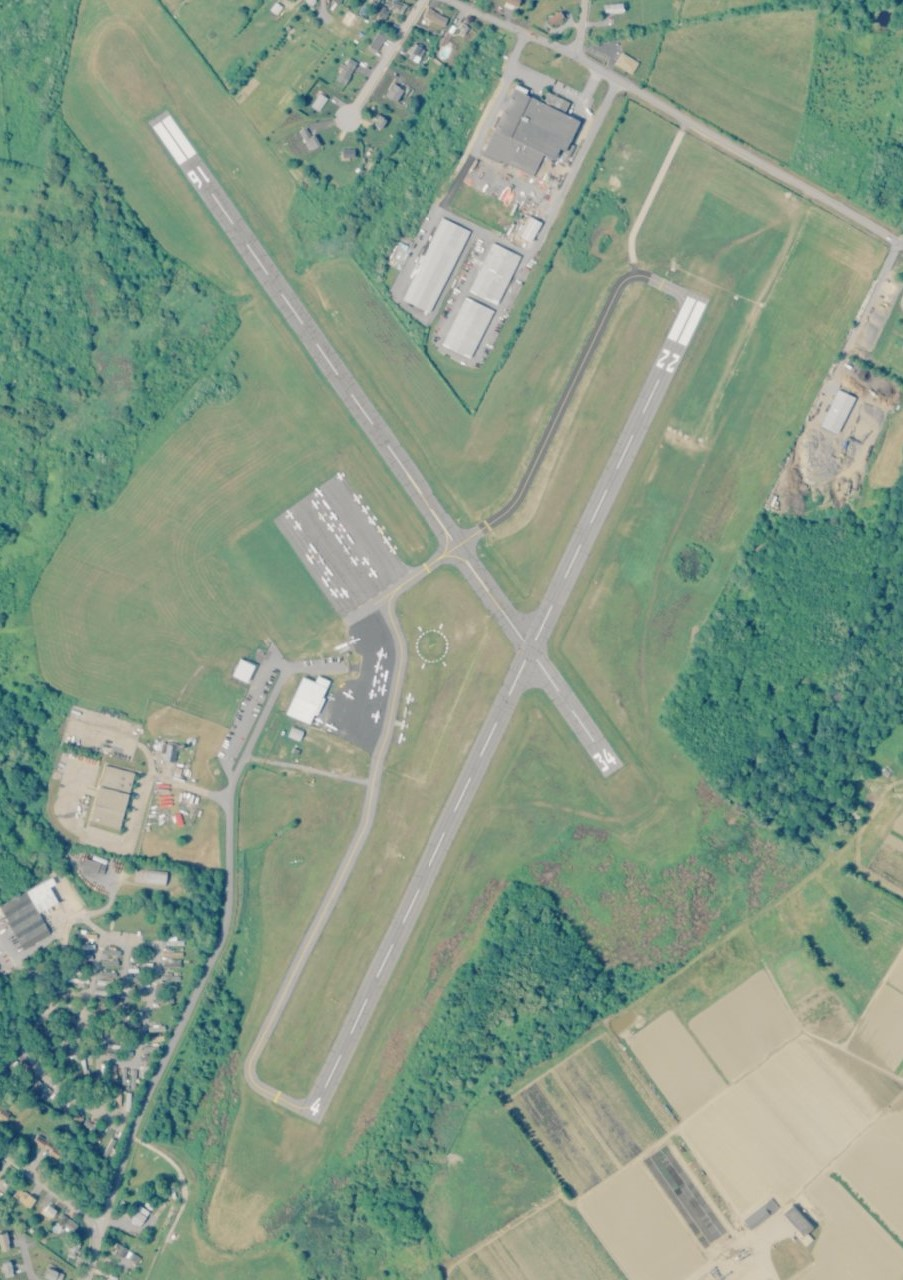
- USGS 2006 orthophoto
- IATA: NPT; ICAO: KUUU; FAA LID: UUU

Summary
- Airport type: Public
- Owner: State of Rhode Island
- Operator: Rhode Island Airport Corp.
- Serves: Newport, Rhode Island
- Location: Middletown, Rhode Island
- Elevation AMSL: 172 ft / 52 m
- Coordinates: 41°31′57″N 071°16′54″W
- Website: flynewportairport.com

Map
- Interactive map of Newport State Airport

Runways
Direction	Length		Surface
Direction	ft	m	Surface
4/22	2,999	914	Asphalt
16/34	2,623	799	Asphalt

Statistics (2021)
- Aircraft operations: 20,885
- Based aircraft: 10
- Source: Federal Aviation Administration

Newport State Airport (IATA: NPT, ICAO: KUUU, FAA LID: UUU) (officially known as the Colonel Robert F. Wood Air Park) is a state-owned public-use airport in Newport County, Rhode Island, United States. It serves the city of Newport and is located 2 nmi (2.3 mi; 3.7 km) northeast of its central business district. It is included in the Federal Aviation Administration (FAA) National Plan of Integrated Airport Systems for 2023–2027, in which it is categorized as a basic general aviation facility. There is no scheduled airline service available, but it once was served by Air New England.

Although many U.S. airports use the same three-letter location identifier for the FAA and IATA, this airport is assigned UUU by the FAA and NPT by the IATA (which assigned UUU to Manumu, Papua New Guinea).

Newport State Airport is one of six active airports operated by the Rhode Island Airport Corporation, the other five being T.F. Green State Airport, North Central State Airport, Westerly State Airport, Quonset State Airport, and Block Island State Airport.

== History ==
The airport site was known as Southwick's Grove in the mid-to-late 1800s. At the turn of the twentieth century the site was home to Aquidneck Park, a horse racing track. Wealthy summer residents such as Willie K Vanderbilt, John Jacob Astor and I. Townsend Burden would occasionally race automobiles of various types there. The property was renamed Bethshan-in-the-Woods by Mrs. Theodore K. Gibbs, who had purchased it to preserve the property as a picnic ground for children.

Army Air Force Captain Robert F. Wood established the Newport Air Park on the site in 1946. It appears on topographical maps of the area by 1958 with two airstrips—one along the current 4/22 orientation, and a nearly perpendicular one. They were paved by 1953, when the airport received an Air Force contract to maintain planes for keeping local Air Force pilots current.

The airport site was acquired by the state in July 1960, and new construction of the runways and taxiways was completed by September 1967. In July 1964, the first aircraft accident at the Newport airport (a gear-up landing) was documented by the National Transportation Safety Board. The first fatal accident at Newport State Airport was a mid-air collision between two general aviation aircraft on April 23, 1969. In 2011 part of the film Moonrise Kingdom was filmed at the airport.

== Facilities and aircraft ==
Newport State Airport covers an area of 221 acres (89 ha; 0.89 km^{2}) at an elevation of 172 ft (52 m) above mean sea level.

It has two runways with asphalt surfaces:

- Runway 4/22 is 2,999 by 75 ft (914 by 23 m).
- Runway 16/34 is 2,623 by 75 ft (799 by 23 m).

For the 12-month period ending March 31, 2021, the airport had 20,885 aircraft operations, an average of 57 per day: 96% general aviation, 3% air taxi, and <1% military. At that time there were 10 aircraft based at this airport: all single-engine.

== Airlines and destinations ==
Airlines	Destinations
Tradewind Aviation	Charter: White Plains

Domestic destinations map
All domestic destinations from Newport State Airport (Rhode Island) (KUUU)
• Green = Seasonal destination

== See also ==
- List of airports in Rhode Island
