= Block Island State Airport =

Public airport in Block Island, Rhode Island, United States

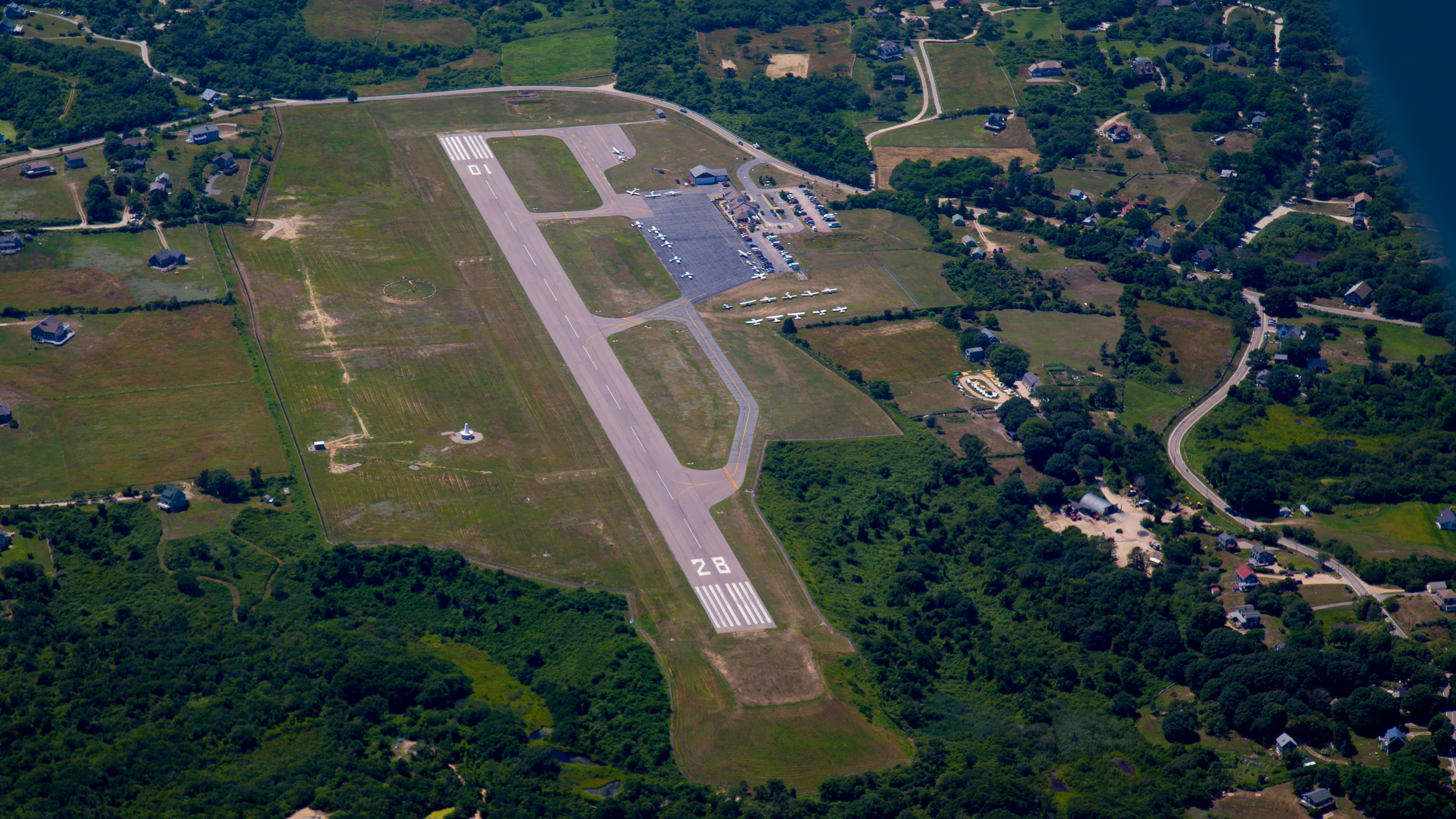
- Block Island State Airport July 2015
- IATA: BID; ICAO: KBID; FAA LID: BID

Summary
- Airport type: Public
- Owner: State of Rhode Island
- Operator: Rhode Island Airport Corporation
- Serves: Block Island, Rhode Island
- Opened: July 15, 1950 (76 years ago)
- Time zone: EST (UTC-05:00:00)
  - Summer (DST): EDT (UTC-04:00:00)
- Elevation AMSL: 108 ft (33 m)
- Coordinates: 41°10′05″N 071°34′40″W
- Website: flyblockislandairport.com

Map
- Interactive map of Block Island State Airport

Runways
Direction	Length		Surface
Direction	ft	m	Surface
10/28	2,502	763	Asphalt

Statistics (2020)
- Aircraft operations (year ending 2/29/2020): 17,014
- Based aircraft (2020): 4
- Source: Federal Aviation Administration

Block Island State Airport (IATA: BID, ICAO: KBID, FAA LID: BID) is a public use airport located on Block Island, in Washington County, Rhode Island, United States. The airport is owned by the state of Rhode Island. It is primarily a general aviation airport, but there is also scheduled airline service to Westerly State Airport. The airport opened in 1950.

As per Federal Aviation Administration records, the airport had 10,384 passenger boardings (enplanements) in calendar year 2008, 8,516 enplanements in 2009, and 9,821 in 2010. It is included in the Federal Aviation Administration (FAA) National Plan of Integrated Airport Systems for 2023–2027 in which it is categorized as a non-hub primary commercial service facility.

Block Island State Airport is one of six active airports operated by the Rhode Island Airport Corporation, the other five being T.F. Green State Airport, Newport State Airport, North Central State Airport, Quonset State Airport and Westerly State Airport.

== Facilities and aircraft ==
Block Island State Airport covers an area of 136 acres (55 ha; 0.55 km^{2}) at an elevation of 108 ft (33 m) above mean sea level. It has one runway designated 10/28 with an asphalt surface measuring 2,502 by 100 ft (763 by 30 m).

For the 12-month period ending 29 February 2020, the airport had 17,014 aircraft operations, an average of 47 per day: 72% air taxi, 28% general aviation, and <1% military. At that time there were 4 aircraft based at this airport: 3 single-engine and 1 multi-engine.

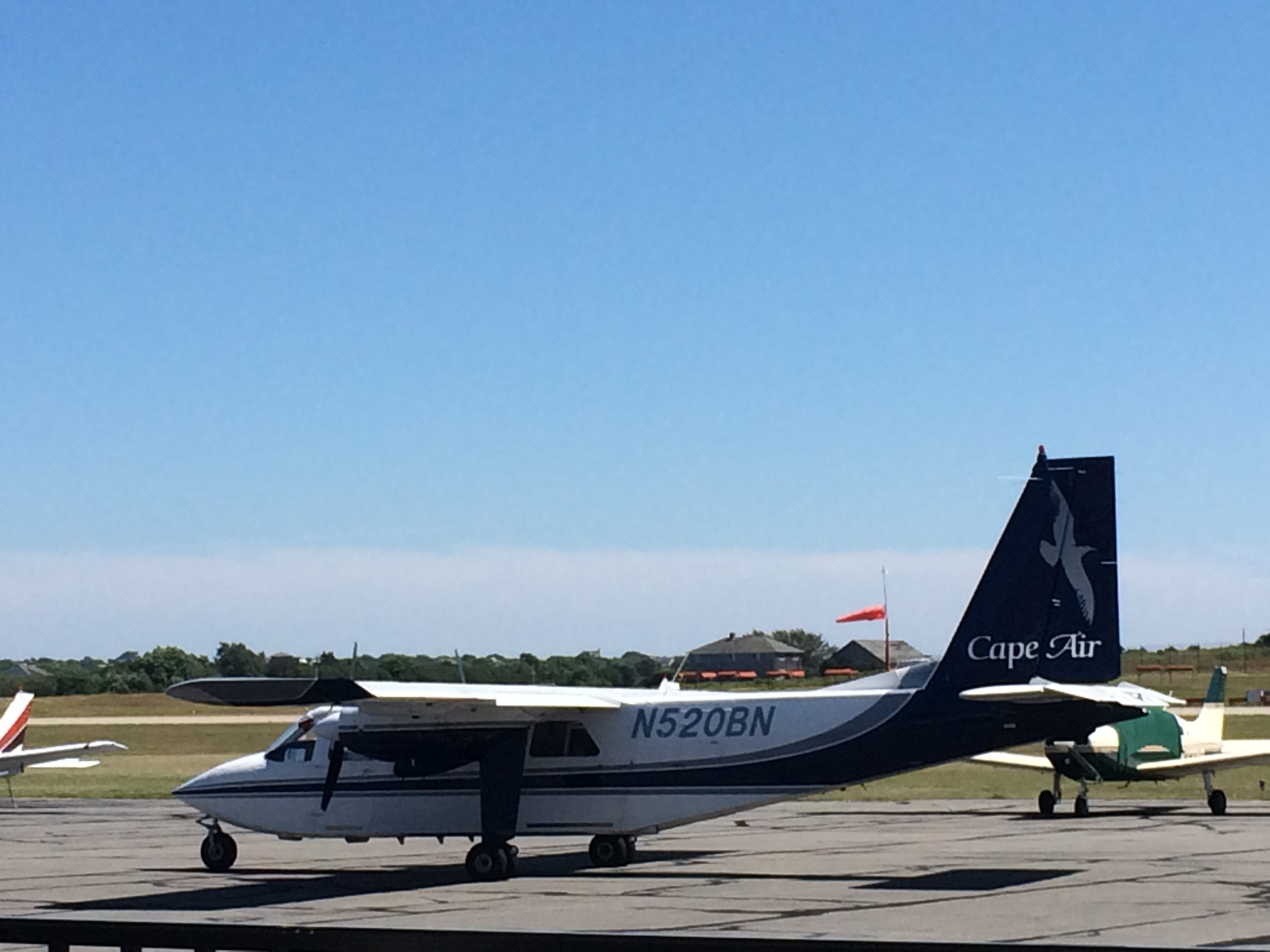
Cape Air Britten-Norman Islander on the tarmac

== Airlines and destinations ==
Airlines	Destinations
Fly The Whale	Westerly
New England Airlines	Westerly
Tropic Ocean Airways	Seasonal: New York Seaplane Base

== Accidents at or near BID ==
- On November 28, 1989, a New England Airlines Britten-Norman BN-2 Islander crashed at sea 4.1 miles NW off Block Island during an overwater flight on a dark moonless night under a cloud layer. The cause of the accident was undetermined. All 8 passengers and crew perished.
- On July 30, 2025, a Piper PA-28 Cherokee, owned by Condair Flyers Flying Club, crashed near the east end of the runway while attempting to land. There were three people on board, one died while two were injured. The flight originated from Albany International Airport.
- On March 25, 2026, a Piper PA-28 Cherokee Six, registration N7081H, crashed in a field after attempting to land at the airport, injuring the two people on board.

== See also ==
- List of airports in Rhode Island
