= List of airports in Rhode Island =

This is a list of airports in Rhode Island (a U.S. state), grouped by type and sorted by location. It contains all public-use and military airports in the state. Some private-use and former airports may be included where notable, such as airports that were previously public-use, those with commercial enplanements recorded by the FAA or airports assigned an IATA airport code.

== Airports ==
This list contains the following information:

- **City served** – The city generally associated with the airport, as per the airport's master record with the Federal Aviation Administration. This is not always the actual location since some airports are located in smaller towns outside of the city they serve. It is not meant to be a complete list of cities served, which can be found in or added to each airport's Wikipedia article.
- **FAA** – The location identifier assigned by the Federal Aviation Administration (FAA).
- **IATA** – The airport code assigned by the International Air Transport Association (IATA). Those that do not match the FAA code are shown in bold.
- **ICAO** – The location indicator assigned by the International Civil Aviation Organization (ICAO).
- **Airport name** – The official airport name. Those shown in **bold** indicate the airport has scheduled passenger service on commercial airlines.
- **Role** – One of four FAA airport categories, as per the 2021–2025 National Plan of Integrated Airport Systems (NPIAS) report released October 2020:
  - P-s: Commercial service – primary are publicly owned airports that receive scheduled passenger service and have more than 10,000 passenger boardings (enplanements) each year. Each primary airport is sub-classified by the FAA as one of the following four "hub" types (s):
    - L: Large hub that accounts for at least 1% of total U.S. passenger enplanements.
    - M: Medium hub that accounts for between 0.25% and 1% of total U.S. passenger enplanements.
    - S: Small hub that accounts for between 0.05% and 0.25% of total U.S. passenger enplanements.
    - N: Nonhub that accounts for less than 0.05% of total U.S. passenger enplanements, but more than 10,000 annual enplanements.
  - CS: Commercial service – nonprimary are publicly owned airports that receive scheduled passenger service and have at least 2,500 passenger boardings each year.
  - R: Reliever airports are designated by the FAA to relieve congestion at a large commercial service airport and to provide more general aviation access to the overall community.
  - GA: General aviation airports are the largest single group of airports in the U.S. airport system. They are public-use airports that do not have scheduled service or have scheduled service with less than 2,500 passenger boardings each year.
- **Enplanements** – The number of enplanements (commercial passenger boardings) that occurred at the airport in calendar year 2024, as per FAA records released October 2025.

City served	FAA	IATA	ICAO	Airport name	Role	Enplanements (2024)
				**Commercial service – primary airports**		
Block Island	BID	BID	KBID	**Block Island State Airport**	P-N	11,867
Providence	PVD	PVD	KPVD	**Rhode Island T. F. Green International Airport**	P-S	1,984,916
Westerly	WST	WST	KWST	**Westerly State Airport**	P-N	12,320
				**Reliever airports**		
North Kingstown	OQU	NCO	KOQU	Quonset State Airport	R	135
Pawtucket	SFZ	SFZ	KSFZ	North Central State Airport	R	6
				**General aviation airports**		
Newport	UUU	NPT	KUUU	Newport State Airport	GA	639
				**Other public-use airports** (not listed in NPIAS)		
Richmond	08R			Richmond Airport		
				**Notable former airports**		
Charlestown				NAAS Charlestown (closed)		
North Kingstown				NAS Quonset Point (closed 1974)		

== See also ==
- Rhode Island World War II Army Airfields
- Wikipedia:WikiProject Aviation/Airline destination lists: North America#Rhode Island
