= 143rd Airlift Wing =

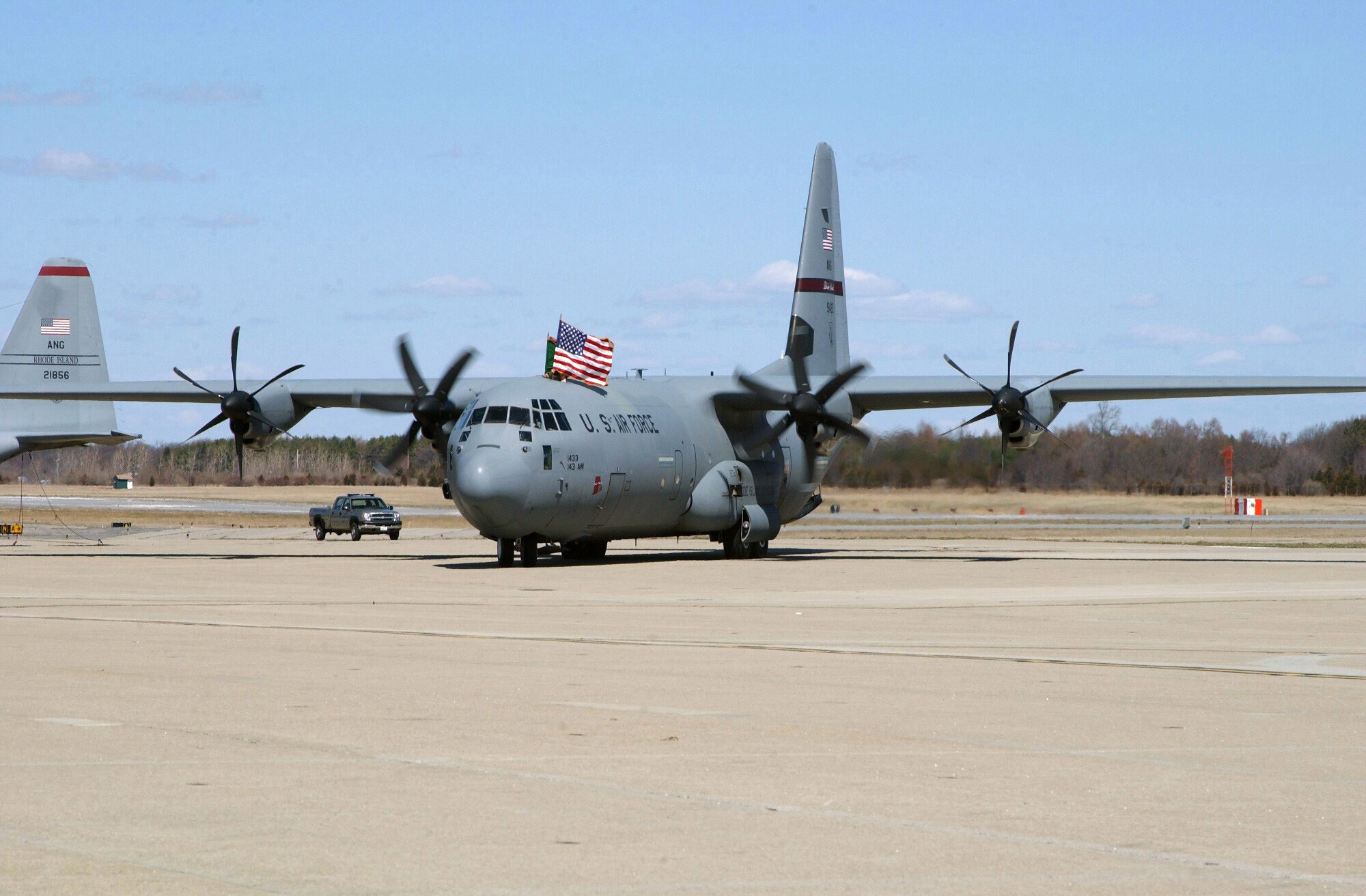
- 143rd Airlift Squadron Lockheed C-130J-30 Hercules
- Active: 1955–1958; 1962–present
- Country: United States
- Branch: Air National Guard
- Type: Wing
- Role: Airlift
- Part of: Rhode Island Air National Guard
- Garrison/HQ: Quonset Point Air National Guard Station, North Kingstown, Rhode Island
- Nickname: "Rhode Warriors"

Commanders
- Current commander: Colonel Adam Wiggins

Insignia
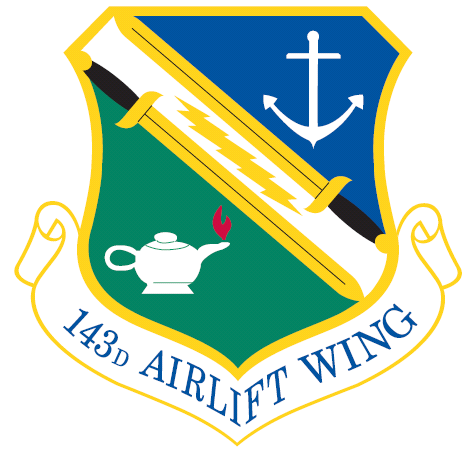
- 143rd Airlift Wing emblem
- Tail stripe: Red, "Rhode Island" in white

The 143rd Airlift Wing (Note: Officially, 143d Airlift Wing.) is a unit of the Rhode Island Air National Guard, stationed at Quonset Point Air National Guard Station, Rhode Island. If activated to federal service, the Wing is gained by the United States Air Force Air Mobility Command. Its mission is to transport personnel and equipment, or, when activated for State Active Duty, to protect life, property and public safety.

The 143rd Airlift Squadron assigned to the Wing's 143rd Operations Group, is a descendant organization of the 152nd Observation Squadron, established on 21 August 1939. It is one of the 29 original National Guard Observation Squadrons of the United States Army National Guard formed before World War II.

== Units ==
The 143rd Airlift Wing consists of the following units:

- 143rd Operations Group
  - 143rd Airlift Squadron
- 143rd Maintenance Group
- 143rd Medical Group
- 143rd Mission Support Group

== History ==
143rd Air Commando Group The unit was renamed the 143rd Air Commando Group on 2 July 1963 and reassigned to the Special Air Warfare Center at Eglin Air Force Base for guidance in unconventional warfare. Initial specialized training at Eglin AFB included low-level airdrop deliveries, sod field and wilderness operations, skip-bombing and other activities in support of irregular ground forces. The new assignment was part of the United States unconventional warfare buildup since 1961 based on the limited warfare operations in Vietnam. The first Group commander was Col Robert M. Magown of Warwick. The first commander of the groups Air Commando Squadron was Col Paul M. Burns of Cranston.

In August 1963, four HU-16s took part in U.S. Strike Command's Joint Exercise Swift Strike III on behalf of TF Blue. TF Blue was made up of XVIII Airborne Corps (82d and 101st Airborne Divisions and 5th Logistical Command), Ninth Air Force, and a Joint Unconventional Warfare Task Force for guerrilla operations. It was the first time since World War II an airborne corps operated against a ground corps. About 85,000 Army troops participated. The unit flew 75 sorties during the exercise. Some of the missions included night landing on a lake in deep red territory to pick up blue guerillas who had been operating behind red lines. The unit made a number of drops of bundles, propaganda leaflets, and several flights in a plane equipped with a loudspeaker to spread propaganda among red troops.

On 31 July 1964, three HU-16 Albatross and three U-10 Courier left Hillsgrove Airport on a 2 1/2-hour training mission at 7pm. One of the U-10 planes crashed in shallow waters shortly before 9:30pm between Conimicut Light and Conimicut Point. Several witnesses reported hearing the plane's engine quit and seeing the lights go out. RIANG members Maj Alan Hall Jr. (navigator) and Capt Donald Leach (pilot) were killed in the crash.

The Operations and Training building opened on 24 October 1965 located at 541 Airport Road, Warwick, RI. Construction began on 22 July 1964. The U-shaped, one-story, 20,000 square feet headquarters building cost $306,000. One wing was for a dispensary, the other for a mess hall and the front was used for administrative offices.

The group was established on 1 July 1968 when the Rhode Island Air National Guard 143rd Special Operations Squadron was authorized to expand to a group level. The 143rd Special Operations Group was established by the National Guard Bureau, with the 143rd SOS becoming the group's flying squadron. Other squadrons assigned into the group were the 143rd Headquarters, 143rd Material Squadron (Maintenance), 143rd Combat Support Squadron, and the 143rd USAF Dispensary.

The Grumman SA-16 Albatross flown by the group since 1955 was replaced in 1968 with an updated version of the Albatross, the HU-16. With twice the cargo capability and range, the HU-16 opened up new avenues of opportunity as was demonstrated in 1970. Flight and Ground crews of the 143rd assisted scientists and engineers of the Naval Underwater Systems Center, conducting studies of undersea acoustics, at Lake Tanganyika in Africa during April and again in August at Hudson Bay, Canada.

The unit would work in the Special Operations field for seven more years, during which the HU-16 aircraft were eventually retired in 1972 and replaced with Fairchild C-119G/L "Flying Boxcars".

=== Tactical airlift ===
In 1975 as part of a larger reorganization the 143rd was redesignated as a Tactical Airlift Group and assigned Lockheed C-130A Hercules aircraft. In 1980 the 143rd Tactical Airlift Group moved from T.F. Green airport to its new home at Quonset Air National Guard Base.

As global airlifters, Rhode Island "Herks" were found in all parts of the United States, Europe, Africa, South America and the Caribbean. The 143rd played a vital role in deployments such as Volant Oak, Volant Pine, Red Flag, Dragon Hammer, Volant Rodeo competitions and humanitarian efforts such as "Operation Toy Lift" which provided toys to the children of Granada on 1986. In 1989, the 143rd was selected for conversion to the C-130E Model.

In 1990 unit volunteers provided support during Operation Desert Shield. In September, unit members flew out of Rhein-Main Air Base, Germany to support operational missions from Turkey and Saudi Arabia. The second group of volunteers arrived at RAF Mildenhall, England in January 1991 and was in the theater of operations when Operation Desert Shield turned into Operation Desert Storm. With the defeat of the Iraqi forces and the end of the Gulf War, members returned home in June 1991 and were released from active duty.

As part of Air Mobility Command the unit continued to be called upon to support State, Federal, and UN activities throughout the world. Volunteers from the 143rd participated in many United Nations relief missions; Somalia in 1992, Operation Provide Promise in 1993 flying daylight air-land missions into Sarajevo along with night airdrops over remote areas of Bosnia-Herzegovina.

On 1 October 1995 the group was elevated to Wing status. In 1998 the Air Force formed the Expeditionary Air Force (EAF); smaller sized war fighting "packages" able to rapidly respond to regional conflicts. The Wing has participated in five AEF cycles, supporting Operation Joint Forge in the Balkans, Operation Southern Watch in Southwest Asia and Coronet Oak in South America.

=== Current operations ===
After the 11 September 2001 terrorist attacks, the wing deployed unit members to Ground Zero, to US bases for homeland security and implemented 24-hour operations at Quonset. The 143rd AW has flown many missions transporting equipment and personnel for the War in Afghanistan (2001-2021) and the War in Iraq. The 143rd AW provided the first C-130J Aircraft in a combat role by the U.S. Air Force in December 2004 and continued to support the war effort with both the C-130E and C-130J until retiring the C-130E in 2005. The 143rd AW also provided and continues to provide the much needed troop support within Southwest Asia and many other areas of the world.

In December 2001, the 143rd received its first C-130J-30. The Wing became the first in the Air Force to receive the "stretch" version of the "J" model. As the most modern tactical airlifter in the world, the C-130J-30 can carry more cargo or personnel farther, faster, and more economically than the C-130E proving its increased airlift capability. The fleet for the 143rd was completed with the arrival of the eighth J-model at Quonset on 15 June 2007.

== Lineage ==
- Established as the 143rd Air Resupply Group and allotted to the Air National Guard

Activated on 20 November 1955
Inactivated on 10 October 1958
Redesignated 143rd Air Commando Group
Activated on 1 July 1963
Redesignated 143rd Special Operations Group on 19 August 1968
Redesignated 143rd Tactical Airlift Group on 4 October 1975
Redesignated 143rd Airlift Wing on 1 June 1992
Redesignated 143rd Airlift Wing on 16 October 1995

=== Assignments ===
- Rhode Island Air National Guard, 20 November 1955 – 10 October 1958
- Rhode Island Air National Guard, 1 July 1963 – present

Gained by Tactical Air Command
Gained by Military Airlift Command, 1 December 1974
Gained by Air Mobility Command, 1 June 1992

=== Components ===
- 143rd Operations Group, 1 October 1995 – present
- 143rd Air Resupply Squadron (later 143rd Troop Carrier Squadron, 143rd Air Commando Squadron, 143rd Special Operations Squadron, 143rd Tactical Airlift Squadron, 143rd Airlift Squadron), 20 November 1955 – 10 October 1958, 1 July 1963 – 19 October 1995

=== Stations ===
- Theodore Francis Green Airport, Rhode Island, 20 November 1955 – 10 October 1958
- Theodore Francis Green Airport, Rhode Island, 1 July 1963
- Quonset State Airport, Rhode Island (later Quonset-Holland Air National Guard Base), 1 April 1980

=== Aircraft ===
- U-10D Super Courier, 1968–1975
- Grumman HU-16 Albatross, 1955–1958, 1968–1972
- C-119 Flying Boxcar, 1972–1975
- C-130A Hercules, 1975–1989
- C-130E Hercules, 1989–2005
- C-130J-30, 2004–Present
