= Quonset State Airport =

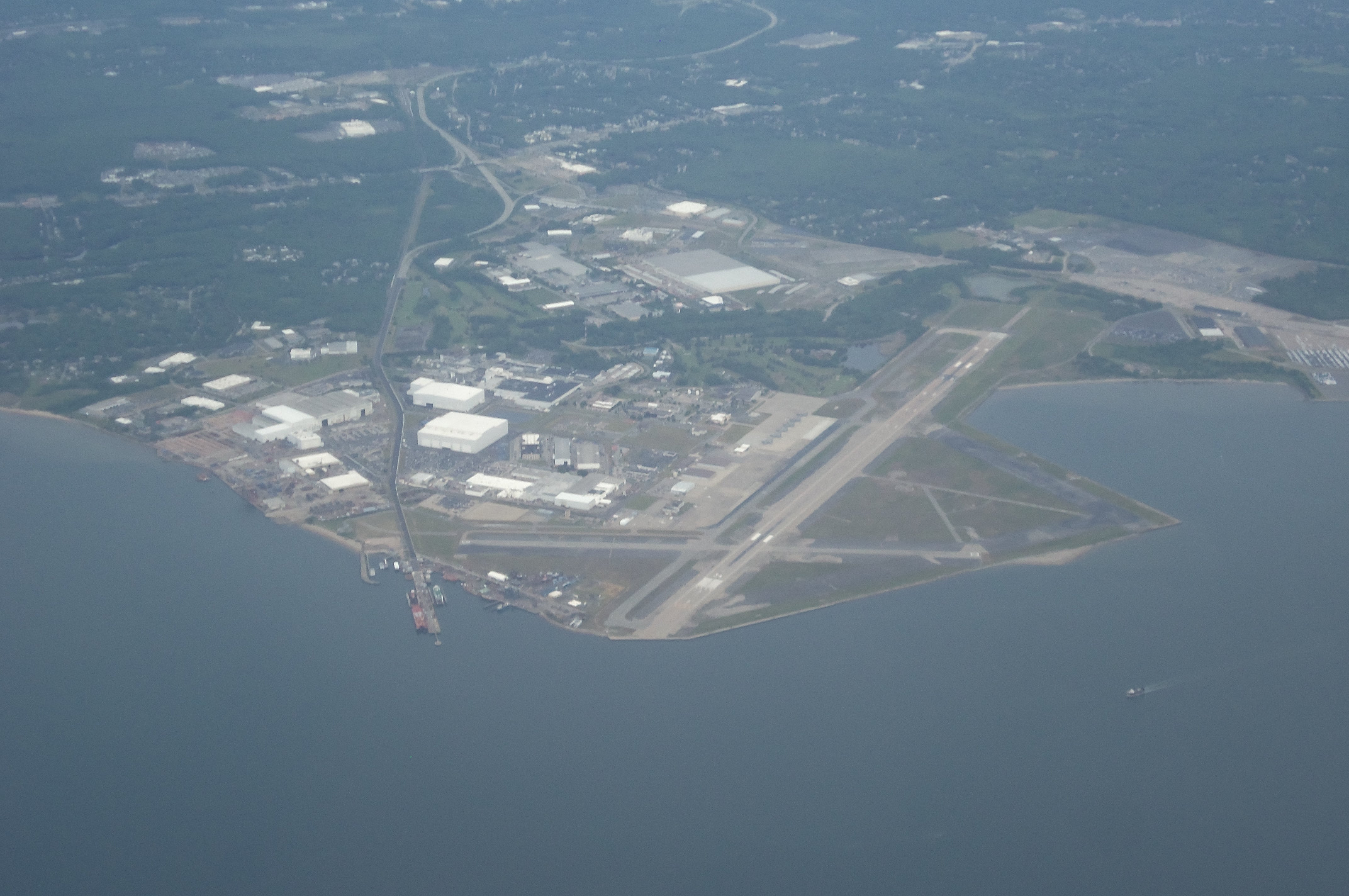
- IATA: NCO; ICAO: KOQU; FAA LID: OQU

Summary
- Airport type: Public
- Owner: Rhode Island Airport Corp.
- Serves: North Kingstown, Rhode Island
- Elevation AMSL: 18 ft (5.5 m)
- Coordinates: 41°35′50″N 071°24′44″W
- Website: flyquonsetairport.com

Maps
- FAA airport diagram as of October 2026
- Interactive map of Quonset State Airport

Runways
Direction	Length		Surface
Direction	ft	m	Surface
16/34	7,504	2,287	Asphalt
5/23	4,000	1,219	Asphalt

Statistics (2022)
- Aircraft operations (year ending 4/30/2022): 19,400
- Based aircraft: 21
- Source: Federal Aviation Administration

Quonset State Airport (IATA: NCO, ICAO: KOQU, FAA LID: OQU) is a joint civil-military public airport located on Quonset Point, in northeastern North Kingstown, Rhode Island, United States, adjacent to Narragansett Bay. It is a general aviation airport and there is no scheduled airline service available. It is included in the Federal Aviation Administration (FAA) National Plan of Integrated Airport Systems for 2023–2027, in which it is categorized as a regional reliever facility.

It was the site of the Naval Air Station Quonset Point from 1941 until the early 1970s, when the military presence in Rhode Island was drastically scaled down. Despite the Navy's departure, the airport remains the home of Quonset Point Air National Guard Station and the 143d Airlift Wing (143 AW) of the Rhode Island Air National Guard, flying the C-130J Hercules. The Rhode Island Air National Guard also maintains an Army Aviation Support Facility adjacent to the Air National Guard Station for the 1st Battalion, 126th Aviation Regiment, flying the UH-60 Blackhawk.

Although most U.S. airports use the same three-letter location identifier for the FAA and IATA, Quonset State Airport is assigned OQU by the FAA but is designated NCO by the IATA.

Quonset State Airport is one of six active airports operated by the Rhode Island Airports Corporation. The other five airports include T.F. Green State Airport, North Central State Airport, Westerly State Airport, Newport State Airport, and Block Island State Airport.

In the early 1980s Providence Airline Corp had daily flights leaving Quonset to Boston, Massachusetts; Hartford County, Connecticut; Syracuse, New York; Buffalo, New York; Chicago, Illinois; and Romulus, Michigan.

On May 19, 2021, Air Force One carrying President Joe Biden landed at Quonset State Airport where he was greeted by Rhode Island Governor Dan McKee as well as Col. Adam Wiggins, the 143rd Airlift Wing Commander and other officials. He then continued on Marine One to the Coast Guard Academy in New London and returned later in the day to depart on Air Force One.

== Facilities and aircraft ==
Quonset State Airport covers an area of 754 acres (305 ha) which contains two asphalt paved runways: 16/34 measuring 7,504 x 150 ft (2,287 x 46 m) and 5/23 measuring 4,000 x 75 ft (1,219 x 23 m).

The airport lies within Class D airspace and has an operating non-federal air traffic control tower (closed on Mondays).

For the 12-month period ending April 30, 2022, the airport had 19,400 aircraft operations, an average of 53 per day: 50% general aviation, 44% military and 6% air taxi. At that time there were 21 aircraft based at this airport: 8 single-engine, 1 jet, and 12 military.

== See also ==
- List of airports in Rhode Island
