= Richmond Airport (Rhode Island) =

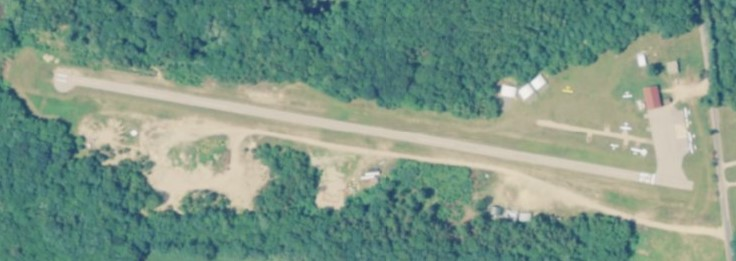
- USGS 2006 orthophoto
- IATA: none; ICAO: none; FAA LID: 08R

Summary
- Airport type: Public use
- Owner: Gordon Realty, Inc.
- Serves: West Kingston, Rhode Island (Richmond, Rhode Island)
- Elevation AMSL: 130 ft / 40 m
- Coordinates: 41°29′22″N 071°37′14″W

Map
- Interactive map of Richmond Airport

Runways
Direction	Length		Surface
Direction	ft	m	Surface
11/29	2,129	649	Asphalt

Statistics (2020)
- Aircraft operations (year ending 3/27/2020): 4,950
- Based aircraft: 22
- Source: Federal Aviation Administration

Richmond Airport (FAA LID: 08R) is a privately owned, public use airport in Washington County, Rhode Island, United States. It is located three nautical miles (6 km) west of the central business district of the village of West Kingston, Rhode Island, in the town of Richmond, Rhode Island.

== Facilities and aircraft ==
Richmond Airport covers an area of 67 acres (27 ha) at an elevation of 130 feet (40 m) above mean sea level. It has one runway designated 11/29 with an asphalt surface measuring 2,129 by 30 feet (649 x 9 m).

For the 12-month period ending March 27, 2020, the airport had 4,950 general aviation aircraft operations, an average of 95 per week. At that time there were 22 aircraft based at this airport: 15 single-engine and 7 ultralight.

== See also ==
- List of airports in Rhode Island
