= New England Airlines =

Airline of the United States

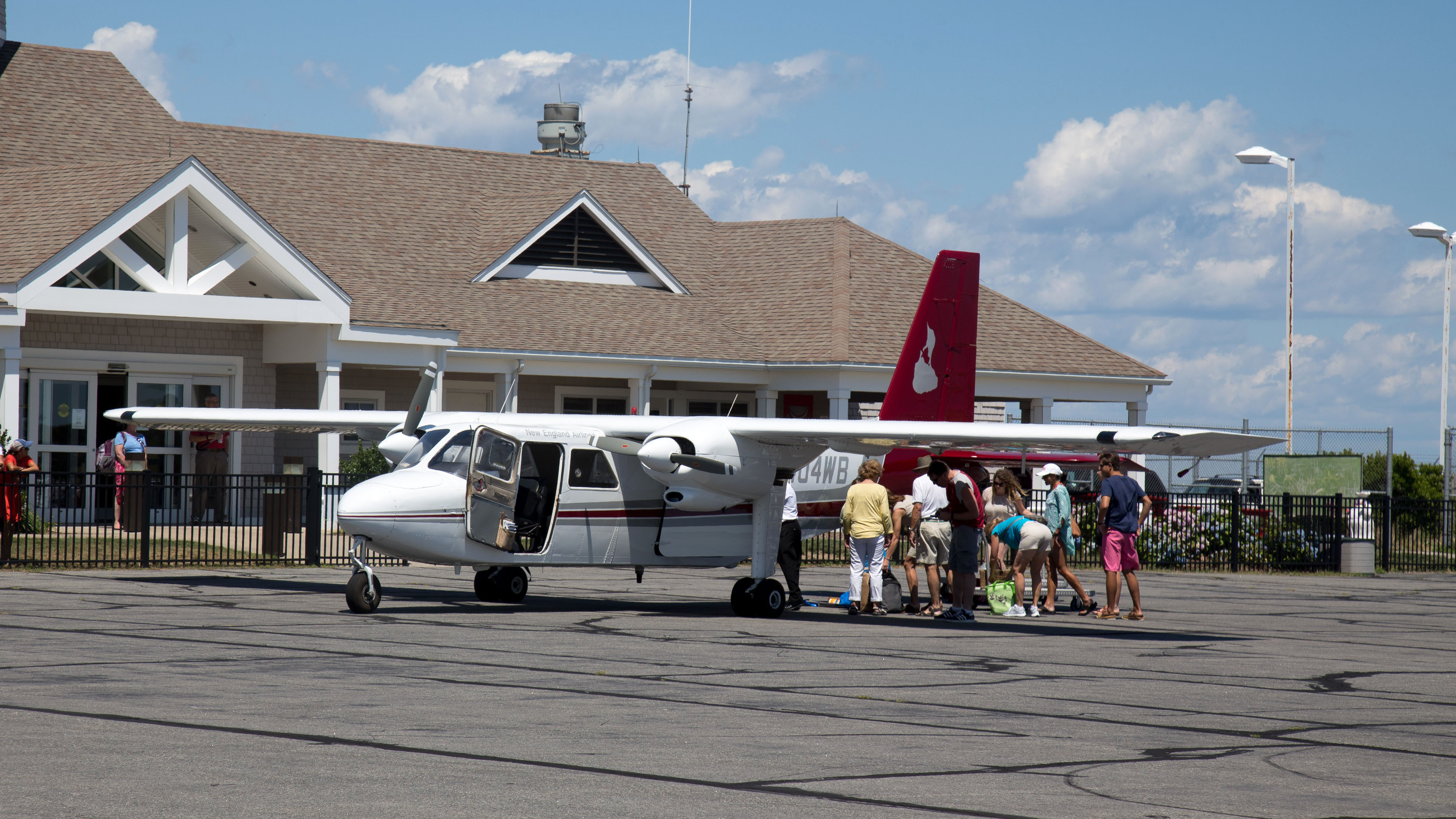
- N404WB At Block Island State Airport
IATA	ICAO	Call sign
EJ	NEA	NEW ENGLAND
- Founded: 1970
- AOC #: NEAA703G
- Operating bases: Westerly State Airport
- Fleet size: 10
- Destinations: 2
- Parent company: New England Airlines, Inc.
- Headquarters: Westerly, Rhode Island, U.S.
- Key people: William Bendokas (President)
- Website: blockislands-airline.com

New England Airlines is a regional airline based in Westerly, Rhode Island, U.S. With a main base at Westerly State Airport, it provides scheduled service to Block Island and operates charters to other airports along the Northeast coast.

== History ==
The airline was established and started operations in 1970. New England Airlines has been in continuous service since then, under the same private ownership. It was and is the only scheduled airline with its primary bases of operation in Rhode Island. This was designed to fulfill the loss of service from a short-lived airline called Viking Airways, which folded in the 1960s. The airline is noted for its provision of cargo delivery services, including Chinese food (and other restaurant orders) delivered from the mainland to the Block Island airport in as little as 90 minutes. The airline only has a half dozen pilots during the winter and over a dozen during the summertime. According to the owner, half of the business comes from charter requests for business workers in the New York area and other locations along the northeast coast. The airline has 10 Aircraft, N401WB, N403WB, N404WB, N409WB, N304SK, N408WB, N405WB and others. as said in an interview with a pilot, "We use these [BN-2s] for charter flights too." and "Those are used for training" (referring to N304SK and another yellow aircraft).

The airline offers a commuter card for discounted rates, as well as charter service throughout the greater Northeast region, not just to and from Block Island.

== Destinations for scheduled flights ==
City	Airport	IATA Code	Destinations	Notes
Rhode Island
New Shoreham	Block Island State Airport	BID	Westerly	Only route they do.
Westerly	Westerly State Airport	WST	Block Island	Only route they do.

== Fleet ==
The New England Airlines fleet consists of the following aircraft:

New England Airlines fleet
Aircraft	In fleet	Orders	Notes
Britten-Norman BN-2 Islander	6	0	Scheduled flights to Block Island State Airport & charter flights in the Greater Northeast
PA-32-300 Cherokee Six	3	0	Charter flights in the Greater Northeast
PA-28-180 Archer	1	0	Charter flights in the Greater Northeast
Total	10	0	

== Accidents ==
- November 28, 1989: BN-2 Islander, N127JL, flying to Westerly crashed into the sea 3 to 5 miles northwest of Block Island. All 8 people on board, 7 passengers and pilot John Beck Jr., were killed. Among the victims, Shirley Wood, was the publisher and co-editor of The Block Island Times, founding editor of People magazine, and former chief of research for Time Life Books. The flight proceeded under a cloud layer on a moonless night while a SIGMET was in effect for moderate to occasionally severe turbulence and possible low level wind shear. The reason for the crash was undetermined.
- September 5, 1999: A Piper Cherokee PA-32-260, N4830S, departing Westerly on a scheduled flight to Block Island lost control and crashed shortly after takeoff, killing two passengers and the pilot; two passengers survived with serious injuries. Pilot Michael Hadik was described as a skilled pilot and flight instructor, with 5259 hours total and 202 in the Cherokee. The NTSB final report determined the cause of the crash was loss of control and stall during a turn.
