= North Central State Airport =

Public airport in Smithfield, Rhode Island, United States

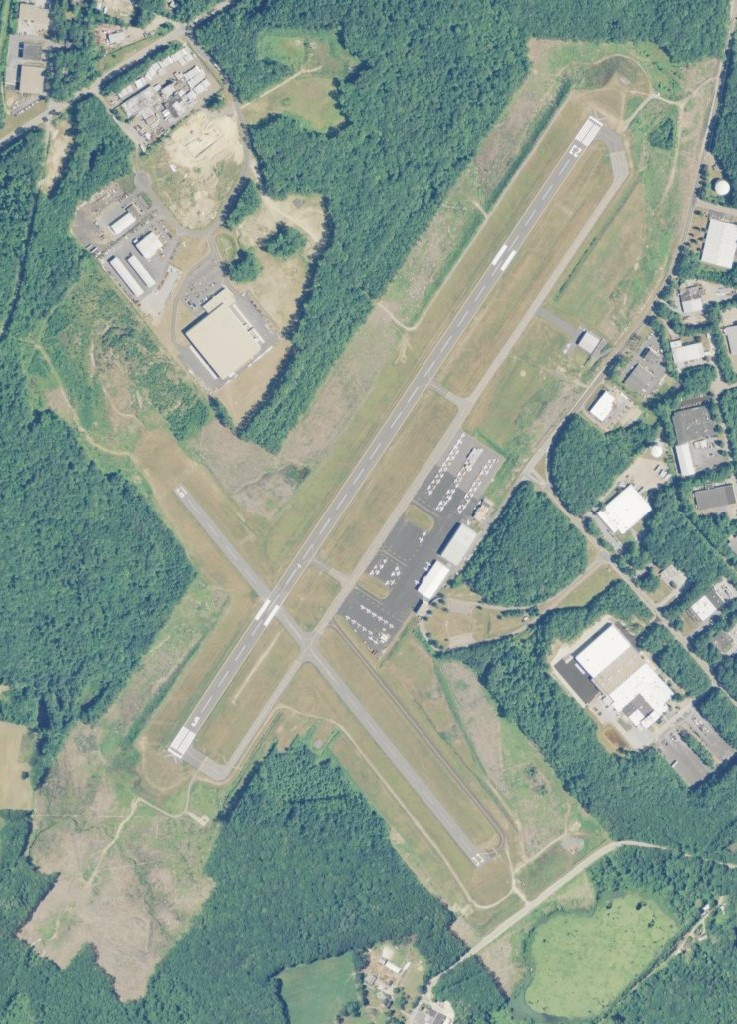
- USGS 2006 orthophoto
- IATA: SFZ; ICAO: KSFZ; FAA LID: SFZ

Summary
- Airport type: Public
- Owner: State of Rhode Island
- Operator: Rhode Island Airport Corporation
- Location: 300 Jenckes Hill Road; Smithfield, Rhode Island; United States
- Opened: December 15, 1951; 74 years ago
- Time zone: EST (UTC-05:00:00)
  - Summer (DST): EDT (UTC-04:00:00)
- Elevation AMSL: 441 ft (134 m)
- Coordinates: 41°55′15″N 071°29′29″W
- Website: www.flynorthcentralairport.com

Map
- Interactive map of North Central State Airport

Runways
Direction	Length		Surface
Direction	ft	m	Surface
05/23	5,000	1,524	Asphalt
15/33	3,211	979	Asphalt

Statistics (2023)
- Aircraft operations (year ending 5/31/2023): 14,687
- Based aircraft: 34
- Source: Federal Aviation Administration

North Central State Airport (IATA: SFZ, ICAO: KSFZ, FAA LID: SFZ) is a public use airport in Providence County, Rhode Island, United States. The airport is owned by the state of Rhode Island and opened for service in 1951. It serves the northern portion of the Providence metropolitan area and is located 3 nmi (3.5 mi; 5.6 km) east of the central business district of Smithfield. It is included in the Federal Aviation Administration (FAA) National Plan of Integrated Airport Systems for 2023–2027, in which it is categorized as a local reliever facility.

The airport is situated in the towns of Smithfield and Lincoln. It is located in the upper region of the state and is roughly horizontally centered in the state, hence the name North Central. It is designated as a reliever airport for general aviation activity from T.F. Green Airport.

North Central State Airport is one of six active airports operated by the Rhode Island Airport Corporation, the other five being T.F. Green State Airport, Quonset State Airport, Westerly State Airport, Newport State Airport, and Block Island State Airport.

Like all state-owned airports in Rhode Island, there is a US$5 landing fee for any aircraft not registered in Rhode Island.

== Facilities and aircraft ==
North Central State Airport covers an area of 475 acres (192 ha; 1.92 km^{2}) at an elevation of 441 ft (134 m) above mean sea level.

It has two asphalt paved runways:

- Runway 5/23 is 5,000 by 100 ft (1,524 by 30 m)
- Runway 15/33 is 3,211 by 75 ft (979 by 23 m)

Runway 5/23 is used more often than Runway 15/33 due to crosswinds.

For the 12-month period ending May 31, 2023, the airport had 14,687 aircraft operations, an average of 40 per day: 95% general aviation, 4% air taxi and <1% military. At that time there were 34 aircraft based at this airport: 32 single-engine, 1 multi-engine, and 1 helicopter.

It is a non-towered airport catering to private pilots and general aviation; the aircraft seen there are usually either piston or light jet aircraft. The airport is not able to serve large airliners, and the use of North Central for these types of aircraft is purely emergency-related. The airport is the base for a repair facility.

== Airlines ==
- Angel Flight America Lancaster
- Flight Options Oxford

== See also ==
- List of airports in Rhode Island
