= Rhode Island Air National Guard =

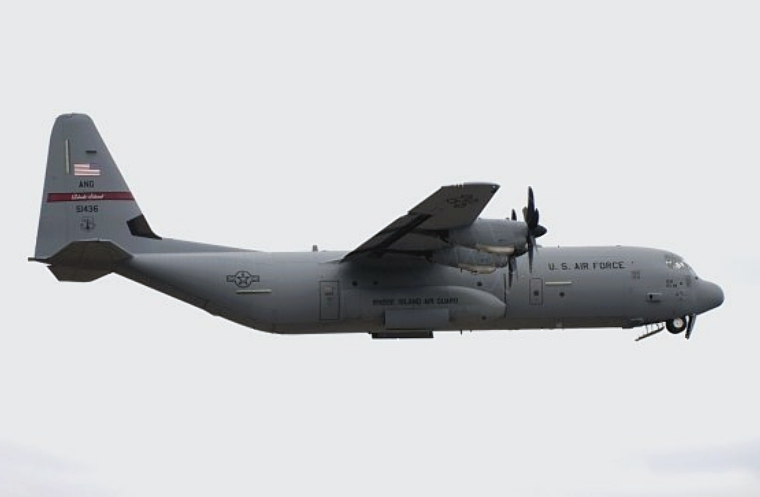
- A C-130J of the 143d Airlift Wing taking off from Quonset Point AGS. The 143d is the oldest unit in the Rhode Island Air National Guard, having over 70 years of service to the state and nation.
- Active: October 13, 1939 – present
- Country: United States
- Allegiance: Rhode Island
- Branch: Air National Guard
- Type: State militia, military reserve force
- Role: "To meet state and federal mission responsibilities."
- Part of: Rhode Island National Guard; United States National Guard Bureau
- Garrison/HQ: Rhode Island Air National Guard, Joint Force Headquarters, 645 New London Ave Cranston, Rhode Island 02920

Commanders
- Civilian leadership: President Donald Trump (Commander-in-Chief); Troy Meink (Secretary of the Air Force); Governor Dan McKee (Governor of the State of Rhode Island)
- State military leadership: Major General Christopher Callahan

Insignia
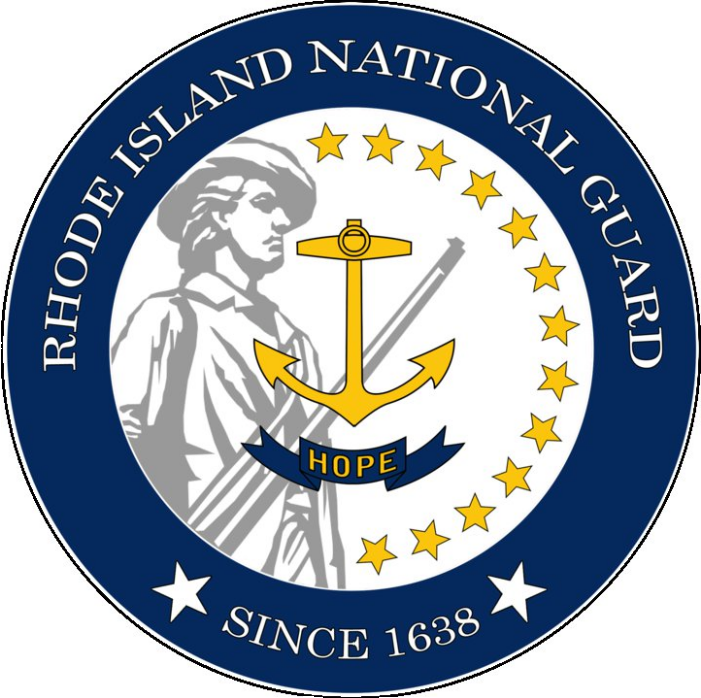
- Emblem of the Rhode Island National Guard

Aircraft flown
- Transport: C-130J Hercules

The Rhode Island Air National Guard (RI ANG) is the aerial militia of the State of Rhode Island, United States of America. It is a reserve of the United States Air Force and along with the Rhode Island Army National Guard an element of the Rhode Island National Guard of the larger United States National Guard Bureau.

As state militia units, the units in the Rhode Island Air National Guard are not in the normal United States Air Force chain of command. They are under the jurisdiction of the governor of Rhode Island though the office of the Rhode Island Adjutant General unless they are federalized by order of the president of the United States. The Rhode Island Air National Guard is headquartered in Cranston, and its commander is Colonel Adam Wiggins.

== Overview ==
Under the "Total Force" concept, Rhode Island Air National Guard units are considered to be Air Reserve Components (ARC) of the United States Air Force (USAF). Rhode Island ANG units are trained and equipped by the Air Force and are operationally gained by a major command of the USAF if federalized. In addition, the Rhode Island Air National Guard forces are assigned to Air Expeditionary Forces and are subject to deployment tasking orders along with their active duty and Air Force Reserve counterparts in their assigned cycle deployment window.

Along with their federal reserve obligations, as state militia units the elements of the Rhode Island ANG are subject to being activated by order of the governor to provide protection of life and property, and preserve peace, order and public safety. State missions include disaster relief in times of earthquakes, hurricanes, floods and forest fires, search and rescue, protection of vital public services, and support to civil defense.

== Components ==
The Rhode Island Air National Guard consists of the following major units:

- 143d Airlift Wing

Established 21 August 1939 (as: 152d Observation Squadron); operates: C-130J Hercules
Stationed at: Quonset Point Air National Guard Station
Gained by: Air Mobility Command
The 143d Airlift Wing provides worldwide combat airlift and combat support forces to the nation, and to provide resources to protect life, property and public safety for Rhode Island and the local community.

Support Unit Functions and Capabilities:

- 102d Information Warfare Squadron

The 102d Information Warfare Squadron is an Air Combat Command (ACC) gained unit which provides Computer Network Defense (CND) services.

- 282d Combat Communications Squadron

The CBCSs install, operate, and maintain combat ready equipment and personnel packages, commonly called Unit Type Codes, to provide deployable communications and information. Services include secure and non-secure Defense Switch-ing Network telephone services, unclassified and classified Internet, email services, video teleconferencing, and text messaging services. The squadron is responsible for establishing these stateside based telecommunications services in the forward deployed theater of operation.

== History ==
=== World War I ===
The first venture of the Rhode Island National Guard into aviation was a Curtis Model F flying boat with a 110 horsepower Curtiss OXX-2 engine that was capable of a speed of 70 miles an hour. It arrived in Providence on 23 June 1916 and assembled at Fields Point. It had standardized control and was also equipped with dual control so that either the operator or mechanic could take control of the aircraft. It was designed as a training aircraft and built to carry three but configured to carry only two. The aircraft was donated by Lyra B. Nickerson through the National Aero Club. Robert Simmons was the instructor and in charge of the aircraft. Maj Gerald T. Hanley was the officer in charge. G.T. Hanley conducted training classes from members recruited from Battery A.

When the National Guard was mobilized in 1917 for the Mexican Border War border conflict and America's entry into the First World War, little use was found for the aircraft and it was stored at the Cranston Street Armory. It had been flown for less than 300 hours. In order to prevent too great of a depreciation of value through deterioration, it was decided to sell the aircraft as surplus on 22 September 1919. There were no plans to continue aviation training in the National Guard at that time.

=== World War II ===
In 1939, with war raging on both the European and Asian continents, President Franklin D. Roosevelt increased measures to prepare the U.S. armed forces for an American involvement. The State of Rhode Island was allocated one of only two new observation squadrons authorized by Congress that year. The 152nd Observation Squadron was organized and less than one year later federalized for extended active duty. After American entry into World War II, the 152nd Observation Squadron immediately took up its primary mission of anti-submarine patrols along the Northeastern shipping lanes. In September 1944 the unit, now designated the 37th Photographic Reconnaissance Squadron, transferred overseas. Assigned to the 15th Air Force, squadron pilots flew photo reconnaissance missions in northern Italy, southern Germany and the Balkans until the end of the war in Europe in June 1945.

=== Cold War ===
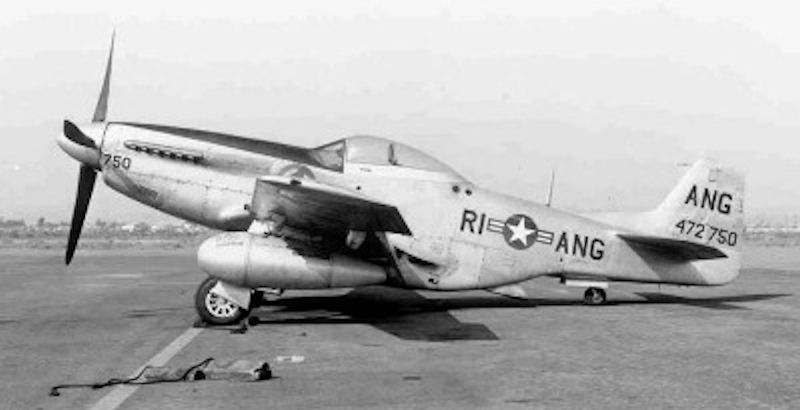
An F-51D Mustang of the 152d Fighter Squadron, 1954

In 1946 the unit was reassigned back to the State of Rhode Island and designated the 152nd Fighter Squadron based at T. F. Green Airport, Warwick, Rhode Island. In September 1948 the 152nd received Federal Recognition and was assigned to the Continental Air Command program which tasked Air National Guard units with the defense of U.S. airspace. Flying the Republic P-47 Thunderbolt and later the North American P-51 Mustang the unit trained for this mission. The USAF, in an effort to upgrade to an all jet fighter force, required Air National Guard Aerospace Defense Command units to upgrade to jet-powered aircraft like the Republic F-84 Thunderjet. This requirement ultimately proved to be the downfall of the 152nd. The Rhode Island Airport Commission and National Guard authorities found themselves in a conflict over the use of T.F. Green Municipal Airport in Warwick for tactical jet operations. Unable to resolve these differences the Air Force removed the jets from the state; however, quick negotiations and the National Guard Bureau's desire to have a flying unit located in every state brought a new mission and the numeric designation which is carried to this day, the 143d.

The 143rd Air Resupply Squadron received federal recognition in November 1955. The National Guard flying program was once again alive and well in the State of Rhode Island. The unit was assigned the Grumman SA-16A Albatross seaplane and for a short time retained the Douglas C-47 Skytrain. There were several minor mission designation changes, and the C-47 was eventually replaced by the Curtiss C-46 Commando.

In 1963 the first major mission change for the 143rd since the days of the fighters occurred. Situations around the world produced a need for specialized units which could insert a small group of trained combat troops on land or sea anywhere at a moments notice. The 143rd was tasked as one of the representatives of the National Guard in the Air Force's Air Commando Group structure. The C-46 Commando was replaced with the Helio U-10A/D Courier. During a three-year period starting in 1965, the U-10s belonging to the 143rd and other Air National Guard units were transferred back to the USAF for use in Vietnam, during which the U-10 was replaced by U-6 Beaver.

In 1968 the U-10s returned from their tour of duty in Vietnam, and at this time the unit was redesignated the 143rd Special Operations Group. The Grumman SA-16A/HU-16A Albatross, flown by 143rd pilots since 1955, was replaced in 1968 with an updated version of the Albatross, the HU-16B. With twice the cargo capability and range, the HU-16B opened up new avenues of opportunity as was demonstrated in 1970. Flight and Ground crews of the 143rd assisted scientists and engineers of the Naval Underwater Systems Center, conducting studies of undersea acoustics, at Lake Tanganyika in Africa during April and again in August at Hudson Bay, Canada.

The unit would work in the Special Operations field for seven more years, during which the HU-16 aircraft were eventually retired in 1972 and replaced with the Fairchild C-119G/L Flying Boxcar, an aircraft which the 143rd would fly for only three years. In 1975 as part of a general program to upgrade the countries Air National Guard units the 143rd was redesignated as a Tactical Airlift Group and assigned Lockheed C-130A Hercules aircraft.

Always pressed for room at TF Green Airport the "new" C-130s, twice the size of anything the unit had previously flown, created quite the concern for the 143rd TAG commanders, flight crews and especially the crew chiefs and maintenance folks of the 143rd Consolidated Aircraft Maintenance Squadron. Relief would arrive in 1977 as part of the United States Navy's 1974 closure of Naval Air Station Quonset Point as part of a post-Vietnam defense cutback and returning the land and facilities to the State of Rhode Island. For the first time since 1915, when Guard pilots flew the Curtiss F from the old National Guard Training Camp at Quonset, the Rhode Island Air National Guard flying unit was to have a home to call its own - coincidentally the site occupied by the 143rd Airlift Group is in approximately the same location as the facilities used in 1915. In 1980, after three years of negotiations and construction the 143rd TAG moved into its new home at Quonset Air National Guard Base. The new facilities provided the room desperately needed to grow and expand the C-130 program. Over the next seven years the men and women of the 143rd trained with the aging "A" model C-130s. Rhode Island "Herks" could be found in all parts of the United States, Europe, Africa, and especially South America and the Caribbean. The RH Air Guard has consistently participated in deployments such as: Volant Oak, Volant Pine, Red Flag, Dragon Hammer, Volant Rodeo competition and humanitarian efforts such as "Operation Toy Lift" which provided toys to the children of Grenada after the U.S. intervention there in 1983.

=== Gulf War 1991 ===
In 1989, after years of getting the job done with the C-130As, the 143rd TAG was finally selected for conversion to the C-130E model "Hercules". Hard work and determination during the conversion paid off in the summer of 1990 when volunteers answered the call to provide support during Operation Desert Shield. The 143rd TAG was among the first of the National Guard units to provide Flight Crews and Maintenance personnel needed by the USAF when additional trained manpower was needed. The first volunteers, in September 1990, flew out of Rhein-Main Air Base, Germany and provided backfill support for active duty personnel transferred into Turkey and Saudi Arabia in response to the Iraqi invasion of Kuwait. The second group of volunteers departed in January 1991 and were stationed at RAF Mildenhall in the United Kingdom. Again, flying backfill operation, this crew had the distinction of being in the "Theater of Operation" when Operation Desert Shield turned into Operation Desert Storm, the Gulf War. This second group of volunteers returned home in February after completing a one-month rotation at Mildenhall ready to return to civilian life and jobs. However, about one week after their return these civilian soldiers were again asked to answer the call to duty, this time by the President of the United States. Not since World War II had members of the Rhode Island Air National Guard flying squadron been called to Federal Service. As in the Second World War the unit initially provided support in the United States doing the jobs vacated by active duty personnel transferred to the Gulf; but in April the unit finally got into the action again returning to RAF Mildenhall. With the defeat of the Iraqi forces and the end of the Gulf War, members returned home in June 1991 and were released from active duty.

=== Humanitarian relief operations ===
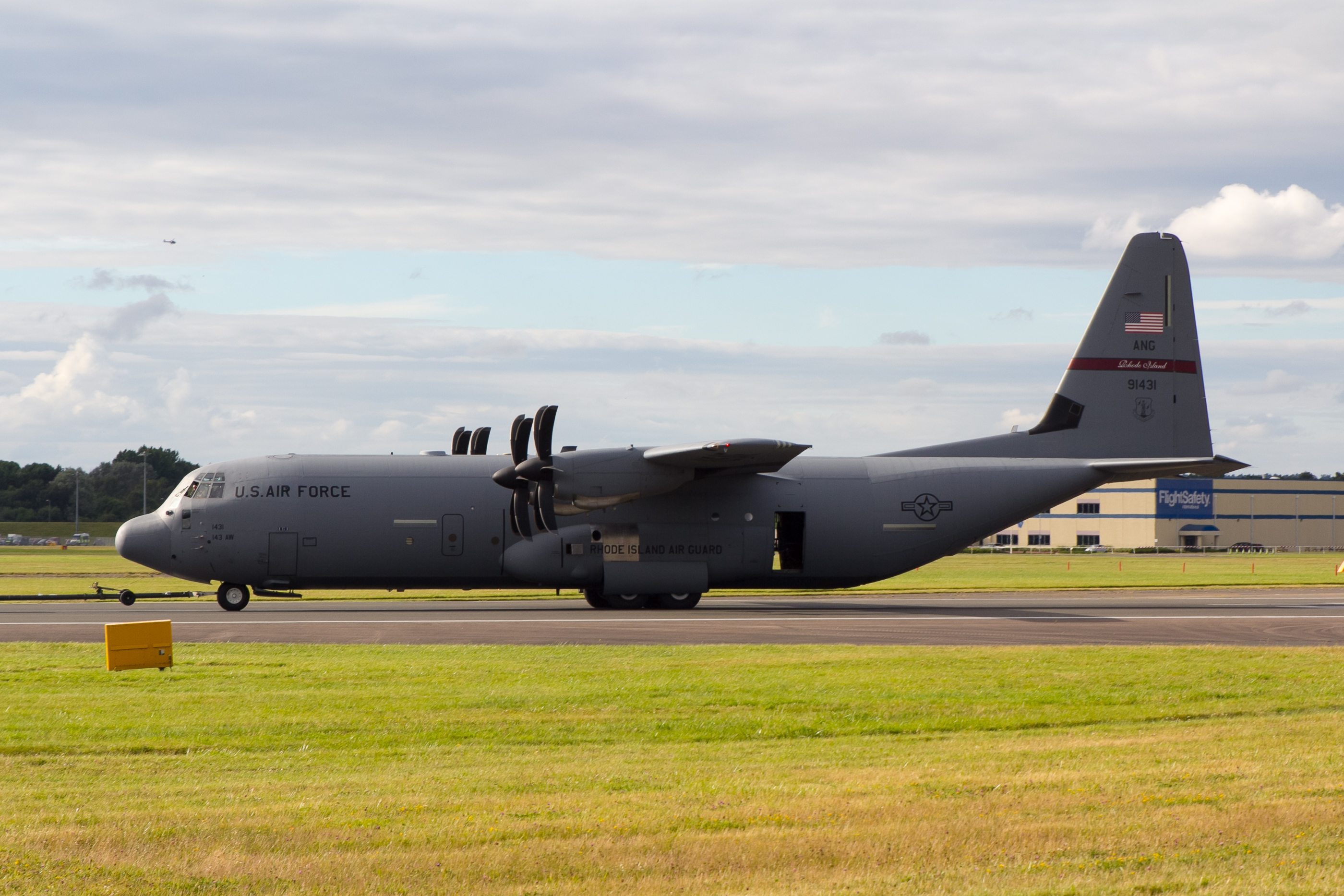
A C-130J-30 of the 143rd Airlift Group at the 2016 Farnborough Airshow

In 1992 the unit was redesignated the 143rd Airlift Group in response to Air Force wide restructuring and assigned to Air Combat Command. The 143rd Airlift Group continues to support State, Federal and United Nations activities throughout the world. Volunteers from the 143rd have participated in may United Nations sponsored relief missions during the last three years; Somalia in 1992 and in late 1992 and much of 1993 Operation Provide Promise, where Rhode Island Air Guardsmen and women flew daylight airland missions into Sarajevo Airport and night airdrops over remote areas of Bosnia-Herzegovina.

In 1998 the USAF formed the Expeditionary Air Force (EAF); smaller sized fighting units able to rapidly respond to regional conflicts. The RH ANG has participated in five AEF operations, supporting Operation Joint Forge in the Balkans, Operation Southern Watch in Southwest Asia and Operation Coronet Oak in South America.

A program of base infrastructure modernization and construction began in 2001 with the acquisition of adjacent land bringing Quonset to 42,800 qm (103.6 acres). An eight-year, $65 million base modernization and construction program included the installation of new fiber-optic, communication and electrical power infrastructure to support future base wide construction; the completion of a new Life Support Building; the complete reconstruction of the Motor Pool roof; construction of a new Aircraft Maintenance and Hangar facility to accommodate the conversion to the C-130J-30. In December 2001, the 143d received its first C-130J-30. The Rhode Island ANG became the first in the Air Force to receive the "stretch" version of the "J" model. The C-130J-30 can carry more cargo or personnel farther, faster, and more economically than the C-130E proving its increased airlift capability. The fleet for the 143d was completed with the arrival of the eighth C-130J at Quonset on 15 June 2007.

=== BRAC 2005 ===
In its BRAC 2005 recommendations, the United States Department of Defense would realign Warfield ANGB, Maryland. DoD recommended to distribute the eight C-130J aircraft of the 175th Wing to the 146th Airlift Wing, Channel Islands ANGS, California (four aircraft), and 143d Airlift Wing (four aircraft). As a result of this recommendation, the 143rd Airlift Wing would retire two C-130E aircraft. This recommendation would move C-130Js to the California ANG and Rhode Island ANG, both of which already operated the C-130J, avoiding conversion training costs. In another recommendation, DoD recommended to realign the Arkansas Air National Guard by realigning one C-130J aircraft to the 143rd Airlift Wing.

=== War on terror ===
After the September 11 attacks 2001, the RI ANG responded to the call again, deploying unit members to Ground Zero, to US bases for homeland security and implemented 24-hour operations at Quonset State Airport. Since September 11 the 143rd AW has supported the war on terror by not only becoming a bridge to and from the theater but by also providing airlift in support of the war effort. The RI ANG provided the first C-130J aircraft in a combat role by the USAF in December 2004 and continued to support the war effort with both the C-130E and C-130J until retiring the C-130E in 2005. The RI ANG also provided troop support within Southwest Asia and many other areas of the world. The location of Quonset being the easternmost C-130 base has become a "bridge" between Europe and the Continental United States in support of Operation Enduring Freedom/Operation Iraqi Freedom. Quonset State Airport is ideally located to fully support all C-130s, both departing for and returning from their overseas missions.

== See also ==
- Rhode Island State Guard
- Rhode Island Wing Civil Air Patrol
