= Quonset Point Air National Guard Station =

Military base in Rhode Island, US

- Near North Kingstown, Rhode Island in the United States
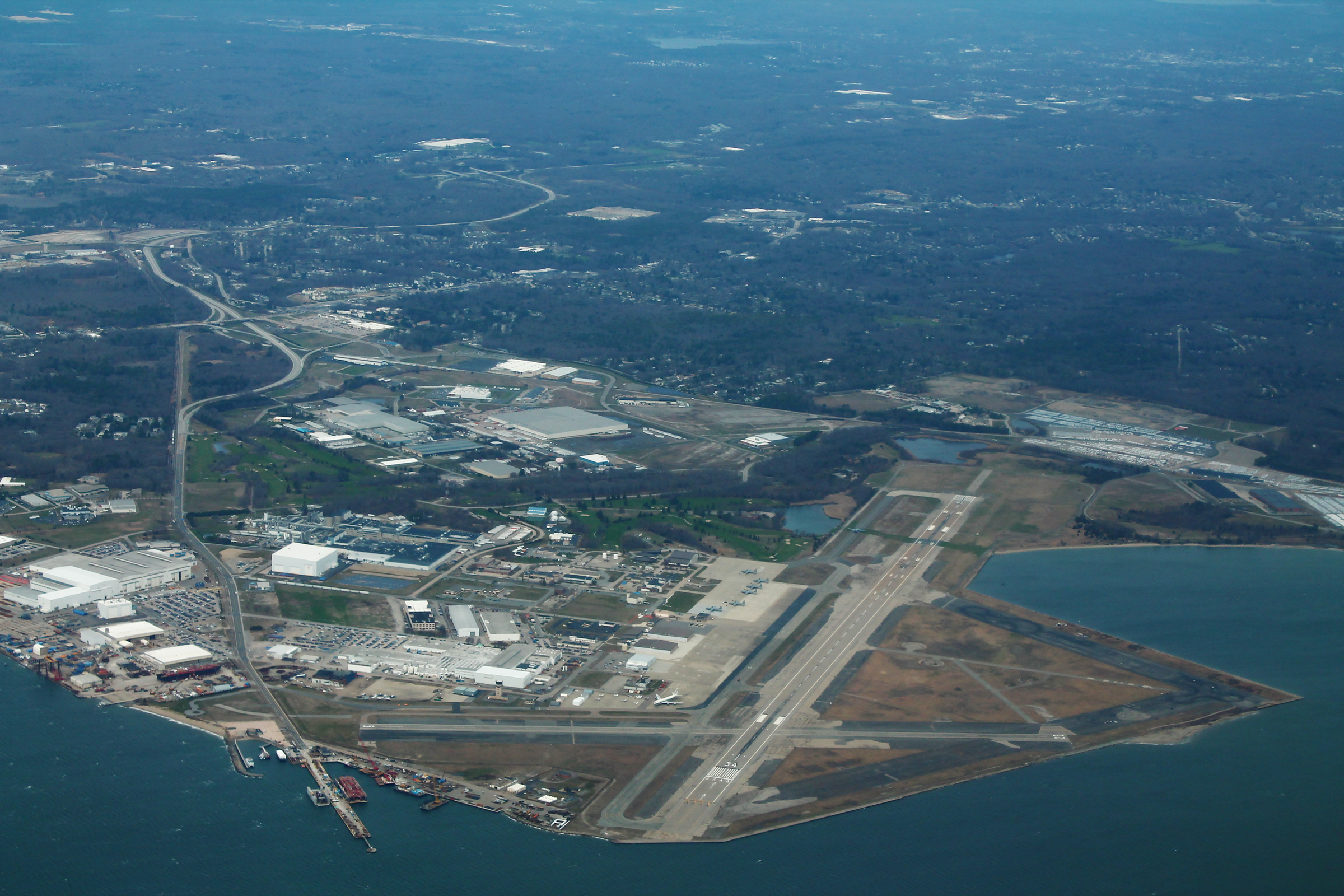
- An aerial view of Quonset Point ANGS during 2016

Site information
- Type: Air National Guard station
- Owner: Department of Defense
- Operator: US Air Force (USAF)
- Controlled by: Rhode Island Air National Guard
- Condition: Operational

Location
- Location within Rhode Island Location within the United States
- Coordinates: 41°35′50″N 071°24′44″W

Site history
- Built: 1941 (as NAS Quonset Point)
- In use: 1941 – present

Garrison information
- Current commander: Colonel Michael A. Comstock
- Garrison: 143rd Airlift Wing

Airfield information
- Identifiers: ICAO: KOQU, FAA LID: OQU, WMO: 725074
- Elevation: 5.4 metres (18 ft) AMSL
Runways
Direction	Length and surface
16/34	2,287.2 metres (7,504 ft) Asphalt
5/23	1,219.2 metres (4,000 ft) Asphalt
- Airfield shared with Quonset State Airport; Source: Federal Aviation Administration

Quonset Point Air National Guard Station is the home base of the Rhode Island Air National Guard 143rd Airlift Wing. Naval Air Station (NAS) Quonset Point was a United States Naval Base in Quonset Point, Rhode Island, that was deactivated in 1974. Next to NAS Quonset Point was Camp Endicott at Davisville, home of the Naval Construction Battalions known as the Seabees. Quonset Point also gave its name to the Quonset hut, a standardized prefabricated building used by the U.S. military starting in World War II. Former US President Richard M. Nixon went through basic naval officer training at Quonset Point in 1942.

== History ==
=== U.S. Navy use ===
Commissioned on 12 July 1941, and encompassing what was once Camp Dyer, NAS Quonset Point was a major naval facility throughout World War II. Beginning in 1943, pilots of the Royal Navy's Fleet Air Arm were trained at Quonset Point to fly the Vought F4U Corsair, which was then brought into service on British aircraft carriers. Squadrons such as VS-33 flew anti-submarine patrols from NAS Quonset Point.

=== Royal Navy use of the airfield ===
From 1 October 1942, facilities at the station were loaned to the Admiralty for use by the Royal Navy as a forming and working‑up base for Fleet Air Arm squadrons receiving American aircraft supplied under the Lend-Lease programme. The Royal Navy contingent was initially administered as part of HMS Asbury, the receiving centre and barracks at Asbury Park, New Jersey, and was later recommissioned as HMS Saker II on 13 March 1943. By 1 October 1943 all Fleet Air Arm squadrons had departed, and the Royal Navy paid off its presence at Quonset Point exactly one year after it began. Responsibility for forming Vought Corsair squadrons subsequently passed to USNAS Brunswick, while the preparation of Grumman Avenger units was transferred to USNAS Squantum.

=== Return to U.S. Navy use ===
NAS Quonset Point continued as a major naval facility well into the Cold War. Prior to its closure, it had been home to numerous aviation squadrons, primarily those land-based patrol squadrons operating the P-2 Neptune and carrier-based antisubmarine and airborne early warning squadrons operating the S-2 Tracker, the E-1 Tracer, SH3D Sea King helicopters and various modified versions of the A-1 Skyraider.

NAS Quonset Point was also the off-season home of Antarctic Development Squadron Six (VX-6, later VXE-6) during the 1950s, 1960s and 1970s, operating the LC-47 Skytrain, LP-2J Neptune, C-54 Skymaster, C-121 Constellation, and eventually the LC-130F and LC-130R Hercules, as well as a variety of helicopters.

In 1950, Coast Guard Air Detachment Quonset Point was established as a sub unit of CGAS Salem, Massachusetts.

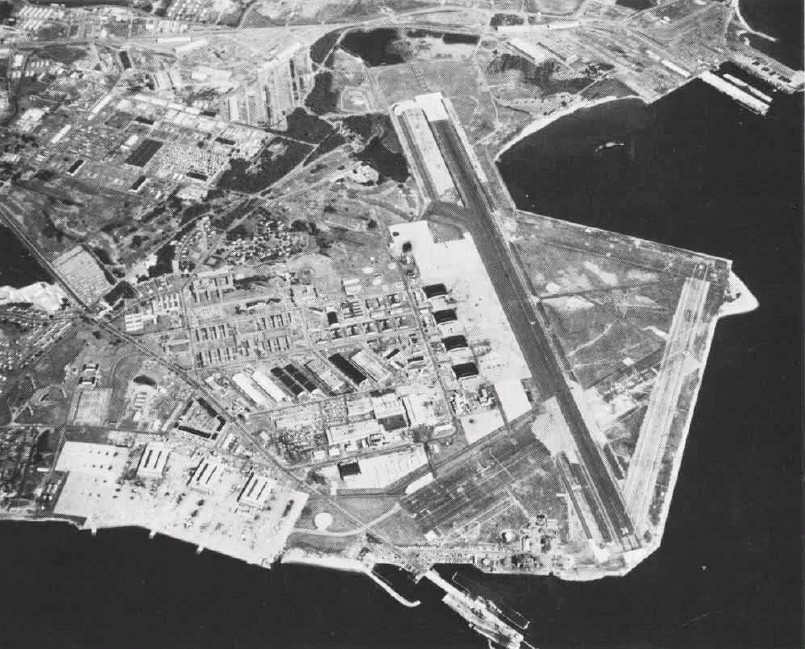
NAS Quonset Point in the 1960s

In addition to flying squadrons, the air station was also home to a major aircraft overhaul and repair (O & R) facility, later renamed Naval Air Rework Facility (NARF) Quonset Point. O & R Facilities, and their later incarnation as NARFs, are the predecessor of the present day Fleet Readiness Centers (FRCs), previously known as Naval Aviation Depots (NADEPs).

Boasting a deepwater port, NAS Quonset Point was also homeport to several Essex class aircraft carriers, including the USS Essex (CV-9), USS Yorktown (CV-10), USS Intrepid (CV-11), USS Randolph (CV-15), USS Wasp (CV-18), USS Leyte (CV-32), USS Antietam (CV-36), USS Lake Champlain (CV-39), USS Tarawa (CV-40) and USS Philippine Sea (CV-47), as well as their respective carrier air groups (CAGs or CVSGs). In September 1945, Air Wing Eighteen became Air Wing Seven here.

NAS Quonset Point was decommissioned on 28 June 1974 as part of a series of defense cutbacks which resulted in a nationwide reduction in bases following the end of the US engagement in Vietnam.

=== Air National Guard use ===
Since the Navy's departure, a smaller military presence has remained in the form of Quonset Point Air National Guard Station, home to the 143rd Airlift Wing (143 AW), an Air Mobility Command (AMC)-gained unit of the Rhode Island Air National Guard, operating the C-130J and C-130J-30 Hercules aircraft. The Rhode Island Army National Guard also maintains an adjoining Army Aviation Support Facility for the 1st Battalion, 126th Aviation Regiment, operating the UH-60 Black Hawk.

Now known as Quonset State Airport (IATA: OQU, ICAO: KOQU), the former NAS Quonset Point is a public general aviation airport with tenant Air National Guard and Army National Guard flying activities, as well as an adjacent industrial park. There is no scheduled airline service. The airport lies within Class D airspace and has an operating non-federal air traffic control tower (closed on Mondays) with two active runways, Runway 5/23 and Runway 16/34. Quonset State Airport is one of six active airports operated by the Rhode Island Airport Corporation.

== Air National Guard use ==
Quonset Point Air National Guard Station is the home of the 143rd Airlift Wing (143 AW), a Rhode Island Air National Guard unit operationally gained by the Air Mobility Command (AMC) of the U.S. Air Force. The mission of the 143 AW is to provide air logistics support pursuant to both its state and federal missions. Originally located at Theodore Francis Green Airport in Warwick, Rhode Island, the 143 AW relocated to the former Naval Air Station Quonset Point in the mid-1980s, with the base initially consisting of 79 acres of leased land.

By July 2001 the base had an additional lease for approximately 15 acres used for the development of their master plan and will allow for construction of facilities to support new C-130J transport aircraft. There are a total of 12 facilities on base: 4 industrial, 6 administrative and 2 services with no family housing. Current base population is approximately 360 personnel during non-drill duty days and increases to approximately 599 personnel on a drill duty weekend, otherwise known as a Unit Training Assembly (UTA), that occurs once per month.

In its 2005 BRAC Recommendations, the DoD would realign Martin State Air National Guard Base (aka Warfield Air National Guard Base), Maryland. The DoD recommended to distribute the eight C-130J aircraft of the 175th Wing (ANG) to the 146th Airlift Wing (ANG), Channel Islands Air National Guard Station, California (four aircraft), and the 143d Airlift Wing (ANG), Quonset State Airport Air National Guard Station, Rhode Island (four aircraft). This recommendation would move C-130Js to Channel Islands ANGS (96), and Quonset State ANGS (125), both of which ranked higher in military value and already operate the J-model C-130, avoiding conversion training costs.

== See also ==
- Naval air station
- USS Antietam (CV-36)
