= Quonset =

Quonset may refer to:

== Places ==
- Quonset Point, a peninsula in North Kingstown, Rhode Island
  - Naval Air Station Quonset Point
  - Quonset State Airport
  - Rhode Island Route 403, signed as Quonset Freeway
- Quonset Glacier, a glacier in Antarctica

== Other uses ==
- Quonset hut, a military structure
- Quonset Hut Studio, a former recording studio in Nashville, Tennessee
