= 401 (disambiguation) =

401 may refer to:

- 401 (number), the natural number following 400 and preceding 402
- A year: 401 BC or AD 401
- Ontario Highway 401, a highway that extends across Southern Ontario, Canada
  - There are also other roads named 401, see the List of highways numbered 401
- 401(a), a type of U.S. tax-deferred retirement savings plan defined by a subsection of the Internal Revenue Code
- 401(k), a type of U.S. employer-sponsored retirement plan defined by a subsection of the Internal Revenue Code
- Titanic The hull number for RMS Titanic
- Bristol 401, a car produced by Bristol Cars in the early 1950s
- HTTP 401, a status in the HTTP protocol indicating authentication has failed
- .401 Winchester Self-Loading centerfire rifle cartridge introduced in 1910
- Area code 401, NANP area code that serves the entire state of Rhode Island
- Cessna 401, an airplane
- Peugeot 401, a family car
- "401", a storyline in the science fiction comedy webtoon series Live with Yourself!

== See also ==
- 401st (disambiguation)
