= 401st =

401st may refer to:

- 401st Air Expeditionary Group, provisional United States Air Force unit assigned to the United States Air Forces in Europe
- 401st Air Expeditionary Wing, inactive unit of the United States Air Force
- 401st Army Field Support Brigade, forward support brigade of the United States Army
- 401st Brigade, an armored unit of the Israeli Defence Forces
- 401st Squadron (disambiguation), several military units

== See also ==
- 401 (number)
- 401 (disambiguation)
- 401, the year 401 (CDI) of the Julian calendar
- 401 BC
