= List of highways numbered 402 =

The following highways are numbered 402:

== Canada ==
- Newfoundland and Labrador Route 402
- Ontario Highway 402

== Costa Rica ==
- National Route 402

== Japan ==
- Japan National Route 402

== United States ==
- Colorado State Highway 402
- Florida:
  - Florida State Road 402
  - County Road 402 (Brevard County, Florida)
- Georgia State Route 402 (unsigned designation for Interstate 20)
- Maryland Route 402
- New York:
  - New York State Route 402 (former)
  - County Route 402 (Albany County, New York)
  - County Route 402 (Erie County, New York)
- North Carolina Highway 402 (former)
- Oregon Route 402
- Pennsylvania Route 402
- Puerto Rico Highway 402
- Rhode Island Route 402
- South Carolina Highway 402
- Texas:
  - Texas State Highway Loop 402 (former)
  - Farm to Market Road 402
- Virginia State Route 402
  - Virginia State Route 402 (former)

Preceded by 401	Lists of highways 402	Succeeded by 403
