= List of highways numbered 401 =

The following highways are numbered 401:

== Canada ==
- British Columbia Highway 401 (former)
- Manitoba Provincial Road 401
- Ontario Highway 401

== Costa Rica ==
- National Route 401

== Cuba ==
- Road to El Fe (4–401)

== Japan ==
- Japan National Route 401

== Norway ==
- Norwegian County Road 401

== Thailand ==
- Thailand Route 401

== United States ==
- U.S. Route 401
- Florida:
  - Florida State Road 401
  - County Road 401 (Brevard County, Florida)
- Georgia State Route 401 (unsigned designation for Interstate 75)
- Kentucky Route 401
- Louisiana Highway 401
- Nevada State Route 401
- New York:
  - New York State Route 401 (former)
  - County Route 401 (Albany County, New York)
- North Carolina Highway 401 (former)
- Pennsylvania Route 401
  - Pennsylvania Route 401 Alternate Truck
- Puerto Rico Highway 401
- Rhode Island Route 401
- Virginia State Route 401
- Washington State Route 401

Preceded by 400	Lists of highways 401	Succeeded by 402
