= Rhode Island Route 4 =

State highway in Rhode Island, US

Route 4
- Colonel Rodman Highway
- Route 4 highlighted in red

Route information
- Maintained by RIDOT
- Length: 10.37 mi (16.69 km)
- Existed: 1965–present

Major junctions
- South end: US 1 in North Kingstown
- Route 102 in North Kingstown; Route 403 in East Greenwich
- North end: I-95 in Warwick

Location
- Country: United States
- State: Rhode Island
- Counties: South, Kent

Highway system
- Rhode Island Routes
| ← Route 3 | → Route 5 |

Route 4, also known as the Colonel Rodman Highway, is a 10.37-mile-long (16.69 km) numbered state highway located in Washington County and southern Kent County, Rhode Island, United States. The route is a major north–south freeway in the southern Providence metropolitan area, directly linking Providence with eastern Washington County, the beaches of Narragansett and South Kingstown, and the city of Newport. Route 4 begins as a two-lane divided highway at an intersection with U.S. Route 1 (US 1) in the town of North Kingstown, becoming a limited-access freeway after 1.89 miles (3.04 km). The route has four numbered interchanges before terminating in the city of Warwick, where the northbound lanes merge into Interstate 95 (I-95).

The origins of Route 4 date back to 1952, when construction began on a short, unnumbered arterial from US 1 to the modern location of exit 3 at Routes 2 and 102 in Wickford. In 1965, the Rhode Island Department of Public Works began work on a 5.4-mile (8.7 km) freeway from modern exit 5 north to the merge with I-95. The freeway, designated as Route 4, was completed in 1972. At that time, the Route 4 designation was also applied to the Wickford arterial. In 1988, the missing link in Route 4 between exits 3 and 5 was completed and opened. The Rhode Island Department of Transportation had long-term plans to upgrade the southernmost portion of Route 4 to freeway status by constructing overpasses at Oak Hill Road and West Allenton Road and a grade separation with US 1. Although the project was originally scheduled to be completed by 2007, the $55 million project has been postponed indefinitely.

== Route description ==
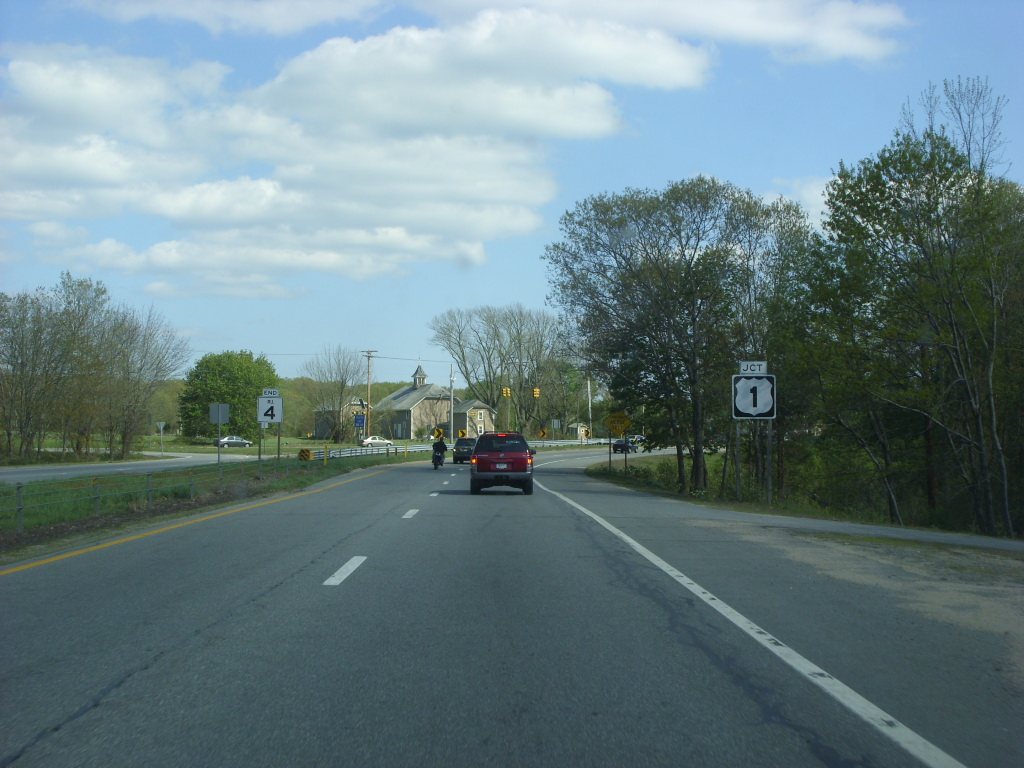
Route 4 approaching its southern terminus at US 1 in North Kingstown

Route 4 begins at a fork in the alignment of U.S. Route 1 in the community of North Kingstown; the two left lanes of US 1 default onto Route 4 north, with the right-hand lane carrying Tower Hill Road and US 1 north into the village of Wickford. Route 4 heads in a northwestern direction as a four-lane divided highway, crossing West Allenton Road at an at-grade intersection with a traffic signal after approximately 0.5 miles (0.80 km). The highway continues on a northwesterly projection, passing to the northeast of Kettle Hole Pond and to the southwest of Secret Lake in a heavily forested region. After Secret Lake, the highway curves to the north, crossing Oak Hill Road at another at-grade intersection.

Shortly after the intersection with Oak Hill Road, Route 4 transitions from a divided arterial highway into a four-lane limited-access freeway. The freeway passes to the west of Belleville Pond and begins to parallel the alignment of Route 102 (Ten Rod Road) near the community of Lafayette. Route 4 passes over Amtrak's Northeast Corridor railroad before entering the business district of Wickford Junction. The freeway interchanges with Routes 2 and 102 at exit 3, a partial cloverleaf interchange. After the interchange, Route 4 bends to the northeast, beginning a parallel alignment with Route 2 that continues to its northern terminus. Route 4 crosses into the town of East Greenwich, passing under South Road before interchanging with Route 2 at exit 5, a partial cloverleaf interchange.

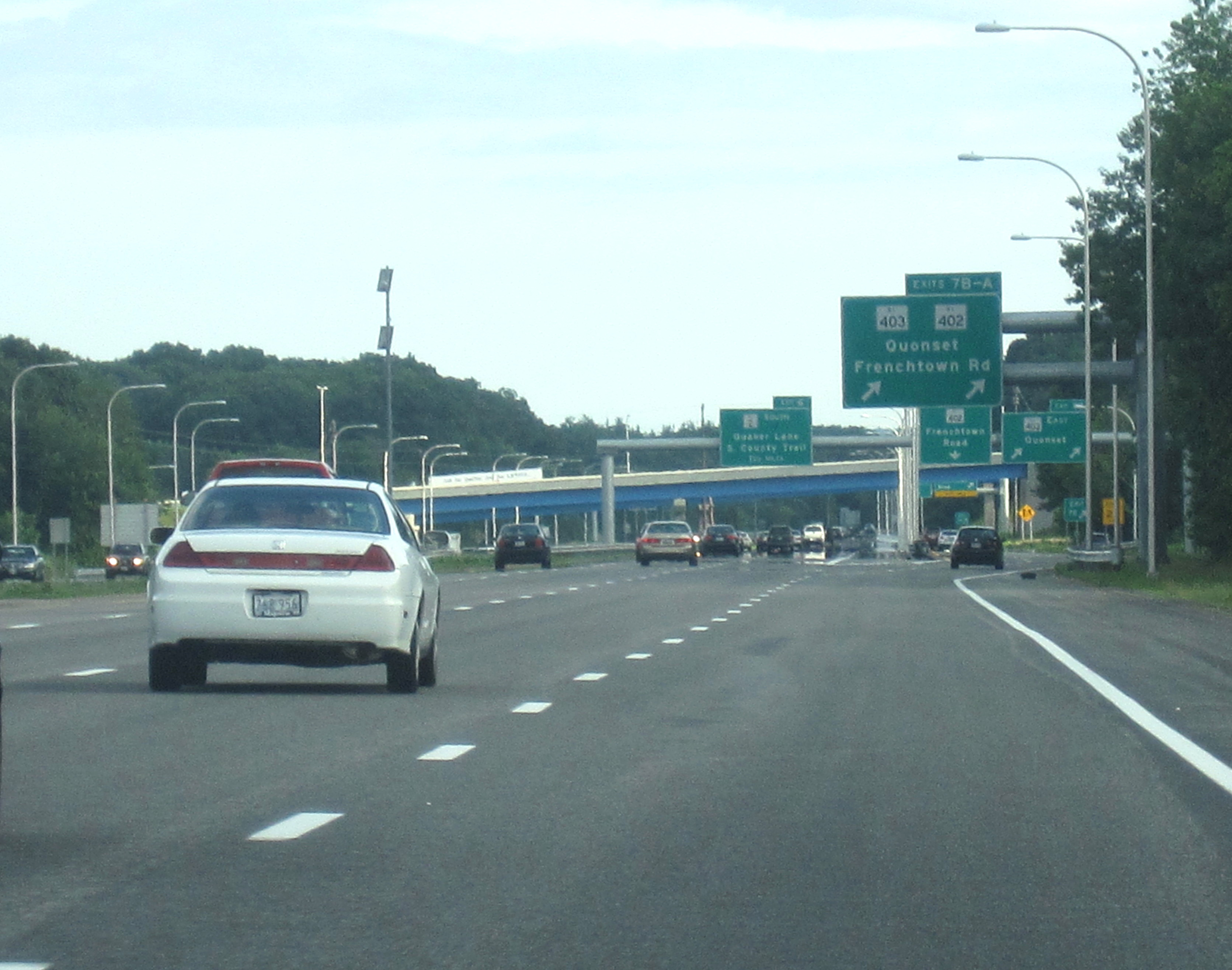
Route 4 southbound at exit 7 in the town of East Greenwich

After exit 5, Route 4 passes the Rhode Island Army National Guard base to the east and to the Hunt River to the west. Route 4 northbound interchanges with Route 403 at exit 7; Route 403, or the Quonset Freeway, is a four-lane, limited access freeway and spur route of Route 4 that serves the Quonset Business Park and the village of Davisville. Heading southbound, exit 7 is split into exit 7B, which serves the Quonset Freeway, and exit 7A, which serves Route 402 (Frenchtown Road), another spur route connecting the highway to US 1 and Route 2. After exit 7, Route 4 continues northward as a six-lane expressway, passing farmlands to the west and entering a suburban region of East Greenwich. The highway crosses under an overpass at Middle Road before interchanging with Route 401, the freeway's final spur, at another partial cloverleaf interchange. Exit 9 is also used to access Route 2 and I-95 south, which has no direct freeway connection with Route 4 north. Shortly after exit 9, the Route 4 designation ends and the mainline of the highway defaults onto I-95 north.

== History ==
In 1950, the Rhode Island General Assembly passed a $12 million (equivalent to $161 million in 2025) bond issue to fund the construction of a 3-mile (4.8 km), four-lane divided arterial bypass of U.S. Route 1 in Wickford. Construction on the highway began in 1952 and was completed in 1954, at which time the roadway opened as an unnumbered state highway leading from US 1 to Routes 2 and 102 in Wickford.

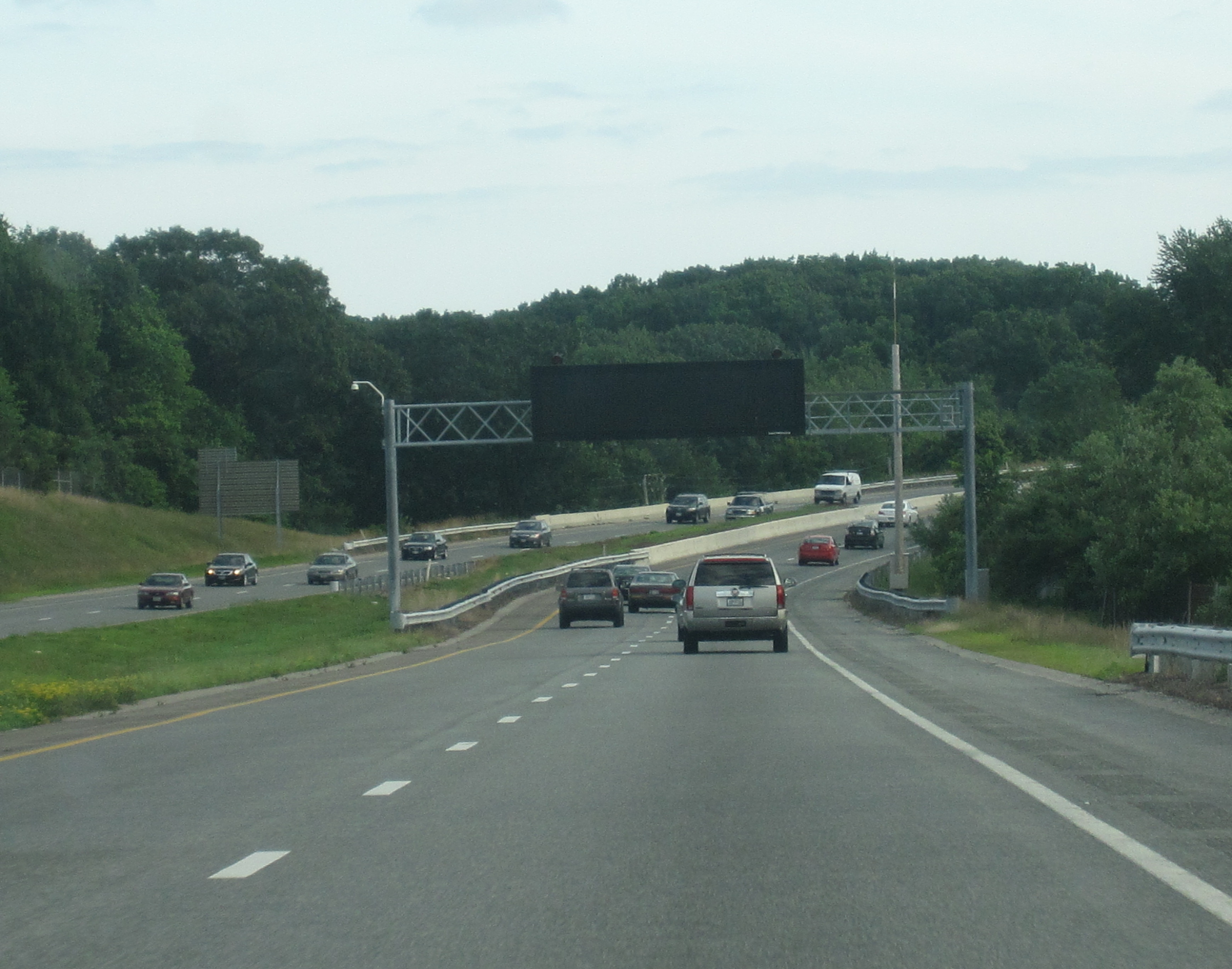
Route 4 southbound through North Kingstown

During the late 1950s, a few years after the completion of the arterial, the Rhode Island Department of Public Works (RIDPW) proposed a relocation of Route 2, which, at the time, was the major thoroughfare in the area. No action was taken until 1964, when the RIDPW introduced a study for the "Relocated Route 2" proposal. During the study, drivers who used the Colonel Rodman Highway arterial and were bound for the state capital of Providence were redirected onto Route 2, an accident-prone, four-lane undivided highway near the modern exit 3. In 1965, the planned Route 2 freeway was given the new number of Route 4, leaving Route 2 on its existing alignment. A public hearing was held by the state of Rhode Island on the proposed freeway, which was to be four lanes and have a divided, grassy median. This proposal was later accepted, and construction began two years later.

Construction of a 5.4-mile (8.7 km) long section of Route 4 from what is now exit 5 in East Greenwich to I-95 in Warwick began in 1967 and was completed in 1972. That year, the 3-mile (4.8 km) arterial south of the modern exit 3 was also designated as part of Route 4. The divided highway remains largely intact to this date as the stretch of Route 4 from US 1 to Routes 2 and 102 at exit 3; the only piece of the arterial that has been significantly altered is the construction of a bridge over Amtrak's Northeast Corridor line. By the early 1970s, Route 4 was complete north of exit 5 and south of what would become exit 3, but there was a still a missing piece in the highway between the two exits. In the 1970s, the state of Rhode Island faced several budget problems and environmental concerns, both of which delayed the construction of the missing link for nearly eleven years. Environmental studies on the missing link began in 1977, and the state estimated that the 1.5-mile (2.4 km) long section of freeway would cost $15–21 million (equivalent to $80–112 million in 2025) to construct.

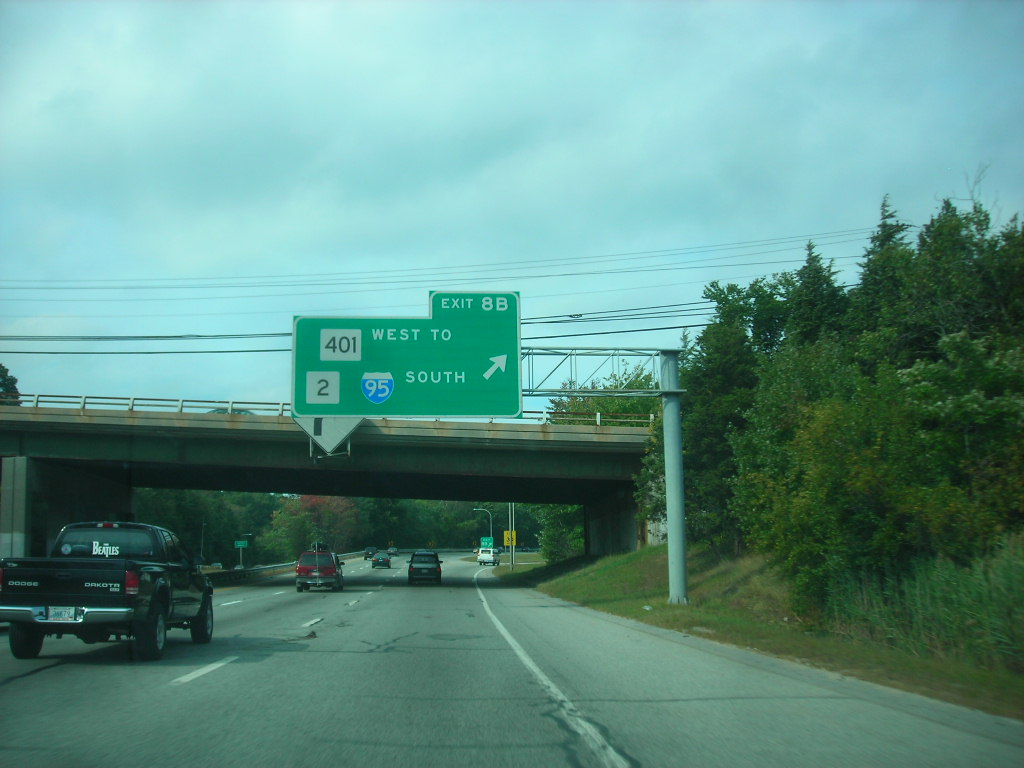
Northbound Route 4 at the interchange with exit 9B in Warwick

In 1983, the Rhode Island Department of Transportation (RIDOT) began construction of the new segment of Route 4 between exits 3 and 5. The project, which ultimately went over budget at $24 million (equivalent to $70 million in 2025)), was financed from a $63 million federal grant. In 1986, during excavation for the new right-of-way, the Department of Transportation found archeological items from the Narragansett Indians dating from about 2,000 to 4,500 years prior. Although the findings were not centralized in the area, this caused delays for the extension of the freeway. On August 6, 1988, RIODT completed construction and performed a ribbon-cutting ceremony for the new highway.

In January 1990, two police cruisers were severely damaged during a chase on Route 4. A driver was speeding in the southbound lanes of Route 4 near exit 7; when the driver exited at Route 402 (Frenchtown Road), two police officers got into serious accidents in their attempts to pursue the vehicle. After the crashes, the American Civil Liberties Union restarted efforts to amend police chase policy and avoid further crash-related injuries for officers in the line of duty.

In 2000, construction began on the Quonset Freeway, a relocated Route 403 that serves the Quonset Business Park from Route 4. The project included the reconstruction and reworking of exit 7 off Route 4, which was a southbound-only exit serving both Route 403 and Route 402 when constructed. The exit was converted into a trumpet interchange with new ramps between Route 4, Route 403 and Route 402 and was completed in December 2008, one year ahead of schedule. The project included the construction of a new northbound exit 7 serving Route 403 east.

== Future ==
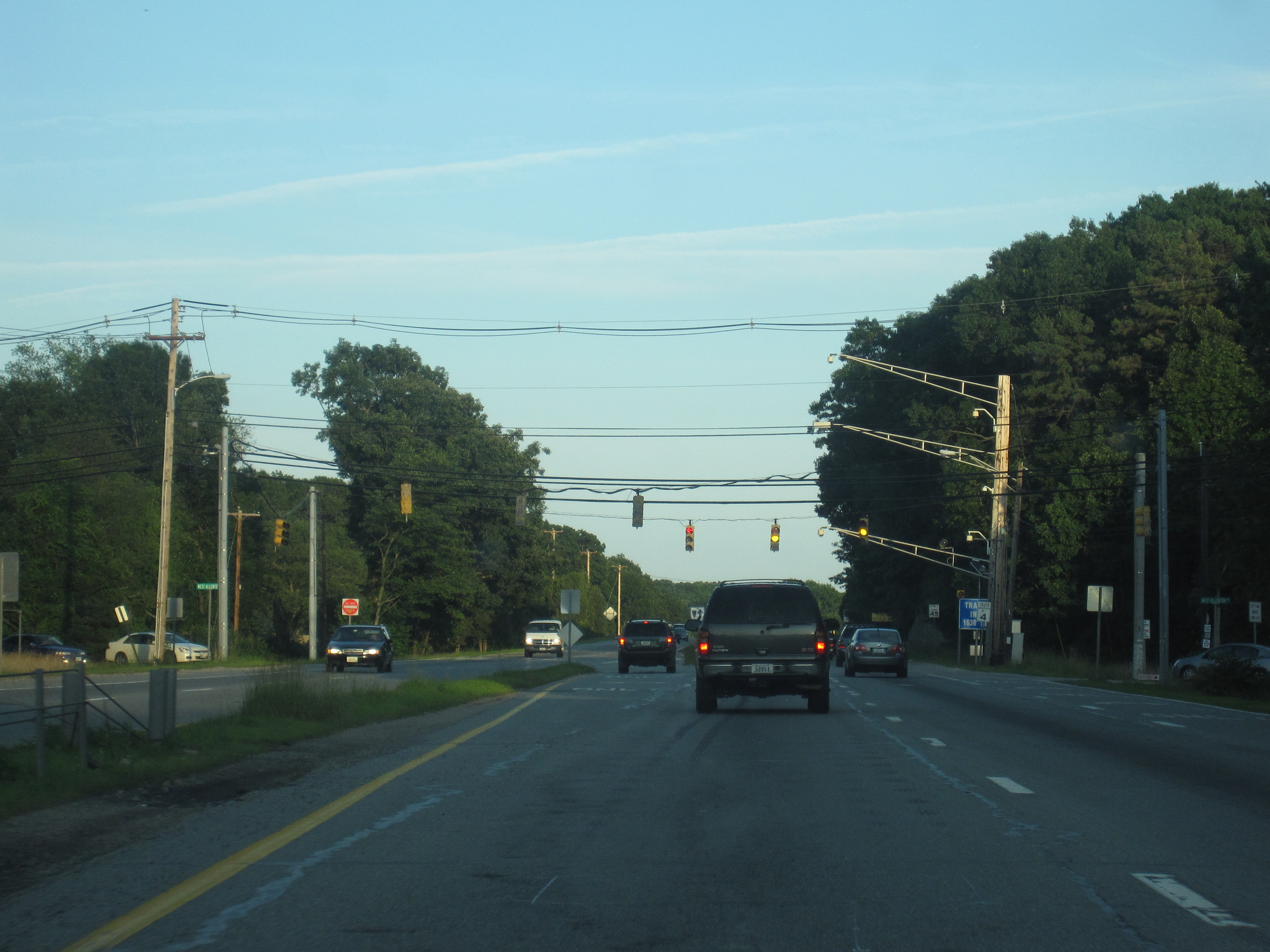
Southbound Route 4 at the West Allenton Road intersection in North Kingstown

The Rhode Island Department of Transportation (RIDOT) has laid out long-term plans for improvements to both the southern and northern termini of Route 4. During the 1980s and 1990s, RIDOT announced plans to eliminate the three traffic lights along the southern end of the highway. The department planned to replace the existing signalized US 1 and Route 4 merge, converting it into a grade-separated interchange with an extensive overpass. This would cut-off access to three local roads that intersect US 1 near the signal. The plan also included the replacement of the two other signaled intersections at West Allenton Road and Oak Hill Road with overpasses; the overpass for West Allenton Road is planned to be constructed as a new exit 4. In the 1990s, the state purchased and demolished several houses in the region to allow for an expanded Route 4 right-of-way in the vicinity of West Allenton Road.

The upgrade proposal proved to be very unpopular with North Kingstown residents who lived on the affected local roads. Additionally, RIDOT laid the highway out so that Route 4 would cross through wetlands in the area. This sparked environmental concerns, as one of the large wetlands that would be affected, Froberg's Marsh, was deemed to be of high value by Rhode Island environmentalists. Despite local and environmental concerns, RIDOT still considers the Route 4 upgrade to be the safest way to improve traffic flow in the region. While the Department of Transportation considered upgrading nearby Route 2 to freeway standards as a potential alternative, this plan was ultimately rejected because of its effects on wells in the area. Although the project was originally scheduled to be completed by 2007, the $55 million project has been postponed indefinitely.

RIDOT also has long-range plans to construct direct freeway connections linking Route 4 north with I-95 south and I-95 north with Route 4 south. By November 2010, environmental studies were being prepared for a reconfiguration of the interchange. In January 2024, the state of Rhode Island was awarded an $81 million federal grant to construct the missing movements between I-95 and Route 4. A new I-95 South entrance ramp from Route 2 at the adjacent interchange will also be constructed.

== Exit list ==
Exits were renumbered in fall 2018 as part of a statewide conversion to mileage-based exit numbers.

| County | Location | mi | km | Old exit | New exit | Destinations | Notes |
|---|---|---|---|---|---|---|---|
| Washington | North Kingstown | 0.00 | 0.00 | | | US 1 south to Route 138 east – Westerly, Newport | No access to US 1 north |
| Washington | North Kingstown | 1.89 | 3.04 | Southern terminus of freeway section | | | |
| Washington | North Kingstown | 3.15 | 5.07 | 5 | 3 | Route 102 / Route 2 – Exeter, Wickford | Signed as exits 3A (north) and 3B (south) southbound |
| Kent | East Greenwich | 5.81 | 9.35 | 6 | 5 | Route 2 (South County Trail) / Quaker Lane – East Greenwich | |
| Kent | East Greenwich | 6.84 | 11.01 | 7A | 7A | Route 402 (Frenchtown Road) | Southbound exit and northbound entrance |
| Kent | East Greenwich | 7.29 | 11.73 | 7B | 7B | Route 403 east – Quonset | Signed as exit 7 northbound; western terminus of Route 403 |
| Kent | Warwick | 9.27– 9.50 | 14.92– 15.29 | 8 | 9 | Route 401 to Route 2 / I-95 south – East Greenwich, | Signed as exits 9A (east) and 9B (west) northbound |
| Kent | Warwick | 10.37 | 16.69 | — | — | I-95 north – Providence | Exit 24B on I-95 south |
1.000 mi = 1.609 km; 1.000 km = 0.621 mi: Incomplete access
