= Seabee Museum and Memorial Park =

Non-profit military history museum in Davisville, Rhode Island

Coordinates: 41.606757°N 71.449404°W

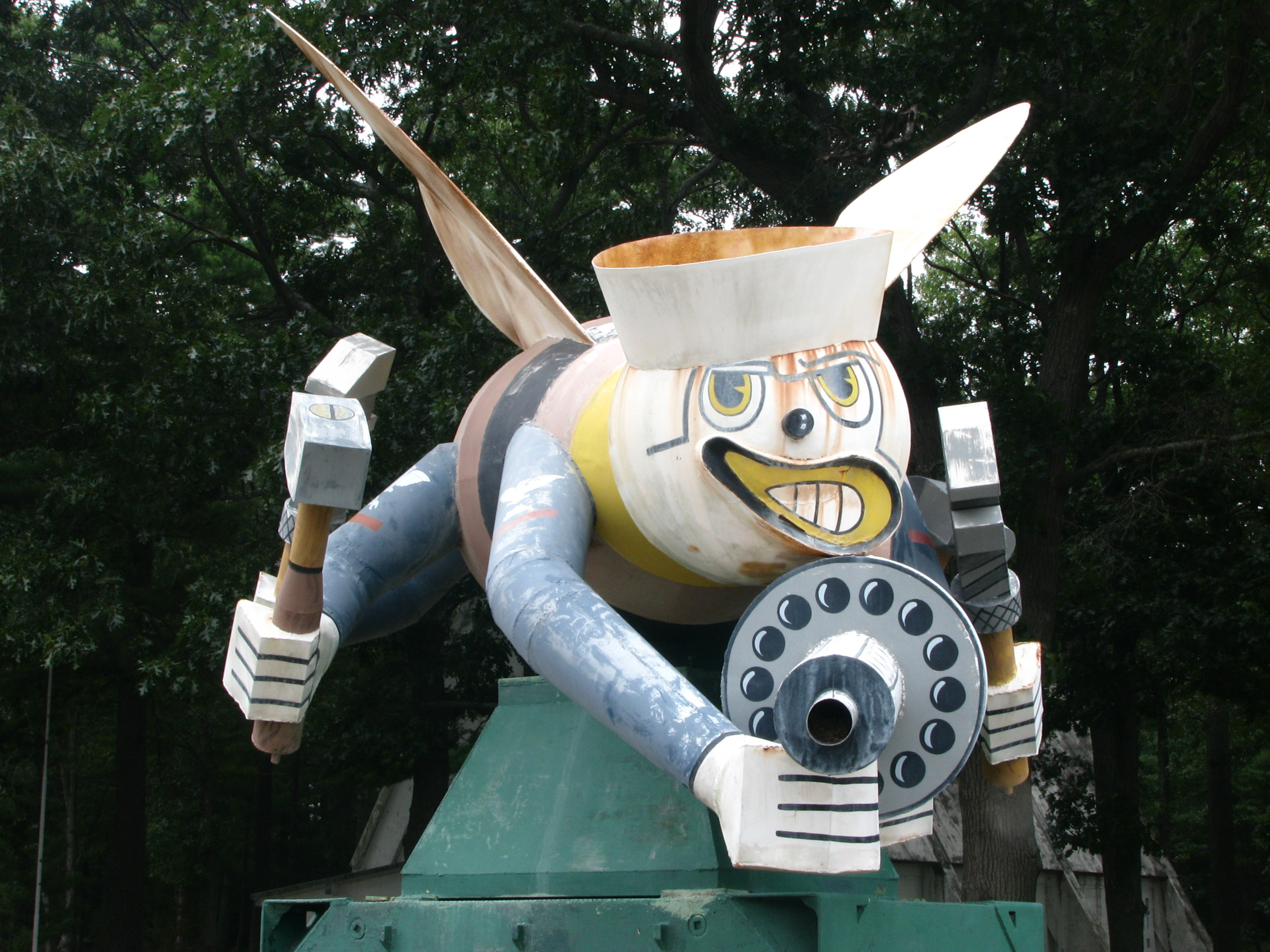
The Fighting Seabee Statue at Quonset Point

Seabees Insignia

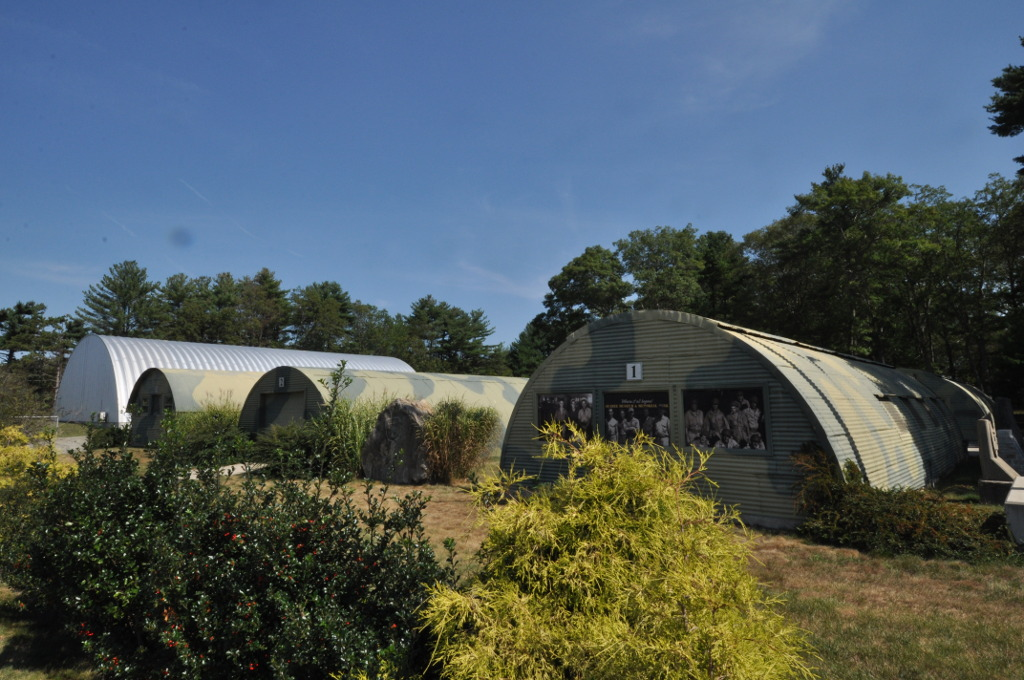
Surviving Quonset Huts from Camp Endicott

Seabee Museum and Memorial Park is a non-profit military history museum in Davisville, Rhode Island, devoted to the Seabees of the U.S. Navy.

Quonset Point, where the Seabee Museum is located was a major United States Navy base during World War II, home to the Naval Air Station Quonset Point and the birthplace of the iconic Quonset Hut. In the 1990s a group of former Seabees and Seabee friends decided to found and construct the museum themselves. The museum is a non-profit museum developed on 6.5 acres (26,000 m^{2}) by former U.S. Navy Seabees. The museum includes the former Navy concrete chapel, seven vintage Quonset huts (saved from the demolition of nearby Camp Endicott), and the original Gate Seabee statue, and the non-profit Quonset Air Museum located in buildings that were originally built for the Naval Air Station Quonset Point (NASQP).

== See also ==
- U.S. Navy Seabee Museum
- U.S. Navy Museum § Other Navy museums
