= Hunt River (Rhode Island) =

River in Rhode Island, United States

Coordinates: 41.6171°N 71.4862°W

The Hunt River is a river in the U.S. state of Rhode Island. It flows approximately 11 km (7 mi). There is a small stone dam just upstream from the Davisville Road bridge that powered a woolen mill active in the period 1811–1924.

== Course ==
The river is formed in East Greenwich by the confluence of Scrabbletown Brook and an unnamed stream. From there, the river flows north along Rhode Island State Route 4, then northeast to Potowomut Pond. Below the pond, the river flows southeast to Potowomut Peninsula where the river widens and becomes known as the Potowomut River.

Most of the Hunt River forms the boundary between Kent and Washington Counties, also separating East Greenwich and Warwick from North Kingstown.

== Crossings ==
Below is a list of all crossings over the Hunt River. The list starts at the headwaters and goes downstream.

- East Greenwich
  - South Road
- North Kingstown
  - Davisville Road (RI 403)
  - Frenchtown Road (RI 402)
  - Post Road (U.S. 1)
  - Austin Road
  - Potowomut Road

== Tributaries ==
The Hunt River has two named tributaries, Frenchtown Brook and Fry Brook. It also has many unnamed streams that also feed it.

== See also ==
- List of rivers in Rhode Island
