= Camp Endicott =

Former US Navy Seabee base in Rhode Island

Coordinates: 41°36′09″N 71°26′16″W

- U.S. National Register of Historic Places
- U.S. Historic district
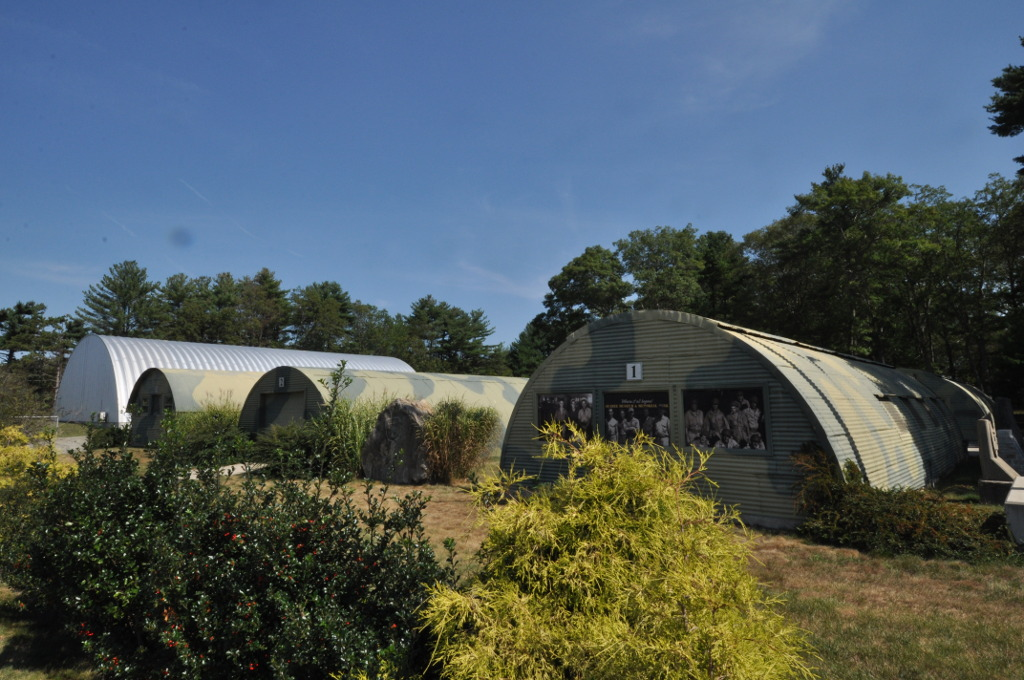
- Surviving Camp Endicott Quonset huts at the Seabee Museum

- Location within Rhode Island Location within the United States
- Location: North Kingstown, Rhode Island
- Built: 1942
- NRHP reference No.: 78000015
- Added to NRHP: October 19, 1978

Camp Endicott was a United States Navy Seabee facility, part of Davisville Naval Construction Battalion Center at Quonset Point in North Kingstown, Rhode Island. A surviving portion of the camp, now mostly demolished, was listed on the National Register of Historic Places in 1978.

== History ==
The vast training camp built at Davisville, Rhode Island in 1942, provided more than 100,000 men of the U.S. Navy's Construction Battalions, better known as "Seabees," with construction training during World War II. During the Vietnam War, eight Naval Mobile Construction Battalions representing some 4,000 Seabees were homeported at Davisville, in addition to 1,200 civilians.

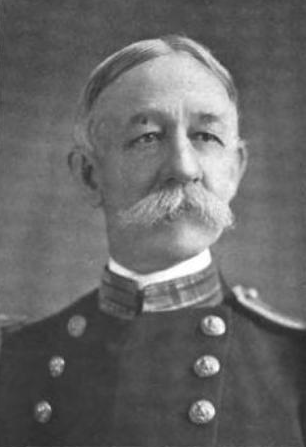
Mordecai T. Endicott (1844–1926)

Named in honor of Rear Admiral Mordecai T. Endicott, the first Civil Engineer Corps Officer to be appointed Chief of the former Bureau of Yards and Docks, Camp Endicott (later established as the U.S. Naval Construction Battalion Center, Davisville) was also the birthplace of the Quonset hut. These semi-cylindrically shaped, prefabricated, portable buildings were designed and produced at Davisville and shipped to various places throughout the world. Because of its design and worldwide dispersion, the Quonset Hut is considered one of the most universal structures in the world.

The Camp Endicott Historical District at Davisville was established to preserve some of these structures as well as a portion of the former Camp that played a vital role in World War II. The seven-acre District, located at the southern boundary of the Center, contained 17 huts. When the area was slated for demolition, a few of the surviving huts were relocated to the Seabee Museum and Memorial Park elsewhere on the former camp grounds.

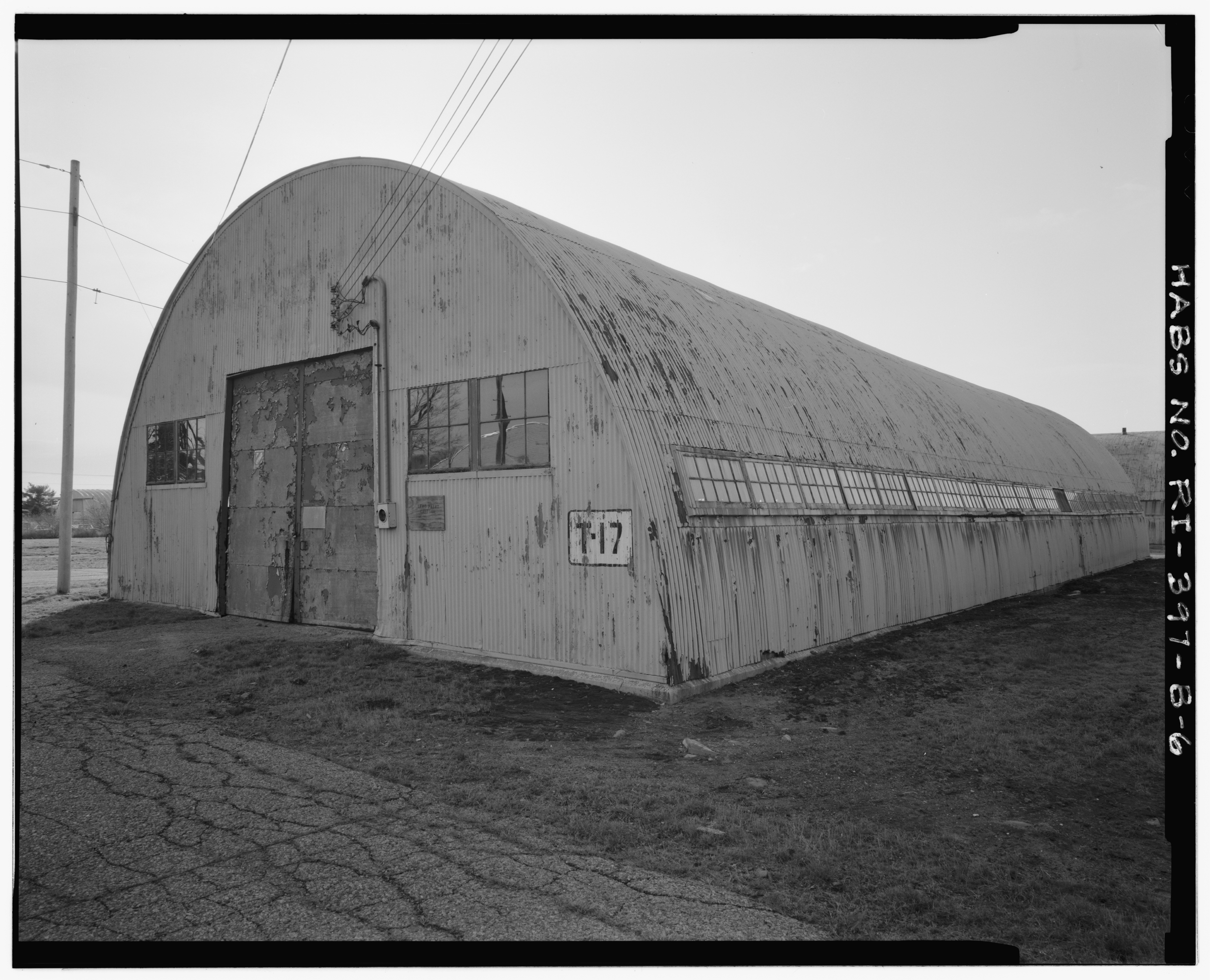
Undated HABS photo of a Quonset hut on site

== See also ==
- National Register of Historic Places listings in Washington County, Rhode Island
