= Rhode Island Route 401 =

State highway in East Greenwich, Rhode Island, United States

Route 401
- Route 401 highlighted in red

Route information
- Maintained by RIDOT
- Length: 2.50 mi (4.02 km)

Major junctions
- West end: Route 2 in East Greenwich
- Route 4 in East Greenwich
- East end: US 1 in East Greenwich

Location
- Country: United States
- State: Rhode Island

Highway system
- Rhode Island Routes
← I-295	→ Route 402

Route 401 is a 2.50-mile (4.02 km) state highway in East Greenwich, Rhode Island, United States.

== Route description ==
Route 401 begins at an intersection with Route 2 (County Trail) / Division Street in East Greenwich, and begins east along a four-lane suburban road. It meets Route 4 (Col. Rodman Highway) just east at a partial cloverleaf interchange, which is exit 8 on Route 4. Route 401 continues east and crosses the Maskerchugg River, then curves southeast and crosses Dark Entry Brook. It then reaches its eastern terminus at US 1 (Main Street) / Rocky Hollow Road just west of Greenwich Cove.

== Major intersections ==
The entire route is in East Greenwich, Kent County.

mi	km	Destinations	Notes
0.00	0.00	Route 2 (South County Trail) to I-95 south / Division Street – North Kingstown, Westerly, West Warwick	Western terminus
0.40	0.64	Route 4 to I-95 north / Route 403 – Narragansett, Quonset, Providence	Exit 9 (Route 4); partial cloverleaf interchange
1.60	2.57	Division Street / East Greenwich Historic District	
2.50	4.02	US 1 (Main Street) / Rocky Hollow Road – North Kingstown, Warwick	Eastern terminus
1.000 mi = 1.609 km; 1.000 km = 0.621 mi

== See also ==
- List of state highways in Rhode Island
