= List of highways numbered 403 =

The following highways are numbered 403:

== Canada ==
- Manitoba Provincial Road 403
- Newfoundland and Labrador Route 403
- Highway 403 (Ontario)

== Costa Rica ==
- National Route 403

== Croatia ==
- D403 road

== Hungary ==
- Main road 403 (Hungary)

== Japan ==
- Japan National Route 403

== Thailand ==
- Thailand Route 403

== United States ==
- Georgia State Route 403 (unsigned designation for Interstate 85)
- Indiana State Road 403 (former)
- New York:
  - New York State Route 403
  - County Route 403 (Albany County, New York)
  - County Route 403 (Erie County, New York)
- North Carolina Highway 403
- Pennsylvania Route 403
- Puerto Rico Highway 403
- Rhode Island Route 403
- South Carolina Highway 403
- Virginia State Route 403
- Washington State Route 403

Preceded by 402	Lists of highways 403	Succeeded by 404
