= 1991 Base Realignment and Closure Commission =

The preliminary 1991 Base Realignment and Closure Commission list was released by the United States Department of Defense in 1991 as part of the ongoing Base Realignment and Closure Commission. The list recommended closing 28 major United States military bases throughout the nation. This was the last Base Realignment and Closure Commission prior to the dissolution of the Soviet Union ending the Cold War.

== Commissioners ==
James A. Courter, chairman; William L. Ball, III; Robert D. Stuart, Jr.; James C. Smith, II, P.E.; Arthur Levitt, Jr.; Howard H. Callaway; General Duane H. Cassidy, USAF (Ret.)

== Justification ==
The commission was established to review the Defense Secretary's list of bases submitted to Congress on April 12, 1991. The seven commissioners and their staff held 28 hearings across the country, visited 47 military installations, and met hundreds of representatives of the surrounding communities. Base closures are politically sensitive issues often resulting in a major economic loss for the surrounding area. Analysts from the General Accounting Office, the Environmental Protection Agency, the Department of Defense, the Logistics Management Institute, and the Federal Emergency Management Agency worked closely with the commission.

== Recommendations ==
Facilities slated for closure/realignment/redirection included:

- Armaments, Munitions and Chemical Command (Realign)
- Army Materials Technology Laboratory (Realign)
- Army Research Institute (Realign)
- Battlefield Environmental Effects Element, Atmospheric Science Laboratory (Realign)
- Beale Air Force Base (Realign)
- Belvoir Research and Development Center (Realign)
- Bergstrom Air Force Base
- Carswell Air Force Base
- Castle Air Force Base
- Construction Battalion Center Davisville
- David Taylor Research Center Detachment Annapolis (Realign)
- Directed Energy and Sensors and Basic and Applied Research Element of the Center for Night Vision and Electro-Optics (Realign)
- Eaker Air Force Base
- Electronic Technology Device Laboratory (Realign)
- England Air Force Base
- Fleet Combat Direction Systems Support Activity, San Diego (Realign)
- Fort Benjamin Harrison
- Fort Chaffee
- Fort Devens
- Fort Dix (Realign)
- Fort Ord
- Fort Polk (Realign)
- Fuze Development and Production (armament and missile-related) Harry Diamond Laboratories (Realign)
- Goodfellow Air Force Base (Realign)
- Grissom Air Force Base
- Harry Diamond Laboratory
- Hunters Point Annex, San Francisco
- Integrated Combat Systems Test Facility San Diego
- Letterman Army Institute of Research (Disestablish)
- Loring Air Force Base
- Lowry Air Force Base
- MacDill Air Force Base (Realign)
- March Air Force Base (Realign)
- Marine Corps Air Station Tustin
- Mather Air Force Base (Redirect)
- Mountain Home Air Force Base (Realign)
- Myrtle Beach Air Force Base
- Naval Air Engineering Center (Realign)
- Naval Air Facility Midway Island
- Naval Air Propulsion Center (Realign)
- Naval Air Station Chase Field
- Naval Air Station Moffett Field
- Naval Air Warfare Center Warminster (Realign)
- Naval Avionics Center (Realign)
- Naval Coastal Systems Center Panama City (Realign)
- Naval Electronic Systems Engineering Center, San Diego
- Naval Electronic Systems Engineering Center, Vallejo
- Naval Mine Warfare Engineering Activity
- Naval Ocean Systems Center Detachment Kaneohe
- Naval Ordnance Station Indian Head (Realign)
- Naval Ordnance Station Louisville (Realign)
- Naval Sea Combat Systems Engineering Station Norfolk (Norfolk)
- Naval Space Systems Activity Los Angeles
- Naval Station Long Beach
- Naval Station Philadelphia
- Naval Station Puget Sound
- Naval Surface Warfare Center Crane (Realign)
- Naval Surface Warfare Detachment White Oak (Realign)
- Naval Undersea Warfare Center Detachment, Cambridge
- Naval Undersea Warfare Engineering Station Keyport'Reference Lists' section.
- Naval Underwater Systems Center Detachment New London
- Naval Weapons Center China Lake (Realign)
- Naval Weapons Evaluation Facility
- Pacific Missile Test Center Point Mogu (Realign)
- Philadelphia Naval Yard
- Richards-Gebaur Air Reserve Station
- Rickenbacker Air National Guard Base
- Sacramento Army Depot
- Trident Command and Control Systems Maintenance Activity
- U.S. Army Biomedical Research Development Laboratory (Disestablish)
- U.S. Army Institute of Dental Research
- Walter Reed Army Institute of Research (Microwave Bioeffects Research)
- Williams Air Force Base
- Wurtsmith Air Force Base

== See also ==
- Loss of Strength Gradient
