= Davisville Naval Construction Battalion Center =

- North Kingstown, Rhode Island
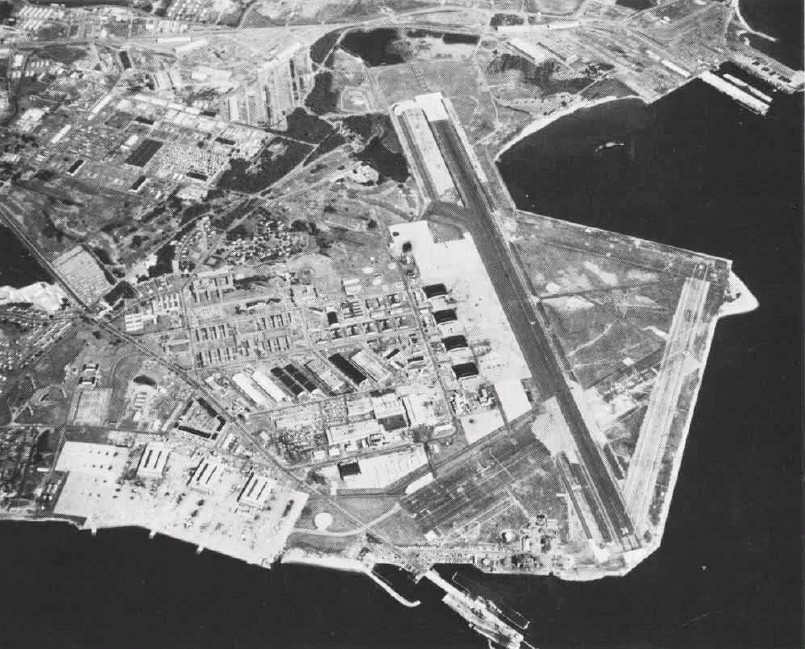
- Naval Air Station Quonset Point and Davisville, circa 1960s

Site information
- Controlled by: United States Navy

Location
- Coordinates: 41°36′19.43″N 71°26′25.49″W

Site history
- In use: 1942-1994

The Davisville Naval Construction Battalion Center was a United States Navy Seabee base located in Davisville, Rhode Island. It operated from 1942 until 1994, when after it was recommended for closure during the 1991 Base Realignment and Closure Commission. It was made up of Camp Thomas, Camp Endicott, the Advanced Base Depot, and the Advanced Base Proving Ground, and was located next to Naval Air Station Quonset Point for most of its existence.
