= 401 Squadron =

401 Squadron or 401st Squadron may refer to:

- 401 Tactical Fighter Squadron, Canada
- 401 Squadron (Portugal)
- 401st Tactical Airlift Squadron (JASDF), Japan
- 401st Aero Squadron, Air Service, United States Army, see list of American aero squadrons
- 401st Bombardment Squadron, United States Air Force
- 401st Fighter Squadron, United States Air Force
- VMFT-401, United States Marine Corps
