= New York State Route 401 =

New York State Route 401 may refer to:

- New York State Route 401 (1930s–1950s) in Columbia County
- New York State Route 401 (1970–1973) in Livingston and Steuben Counties
