= Davisville, Rhode Island =

Village in Rhode Island, U.S.

Coordinates: 41°36′48″N 71°28′31″W

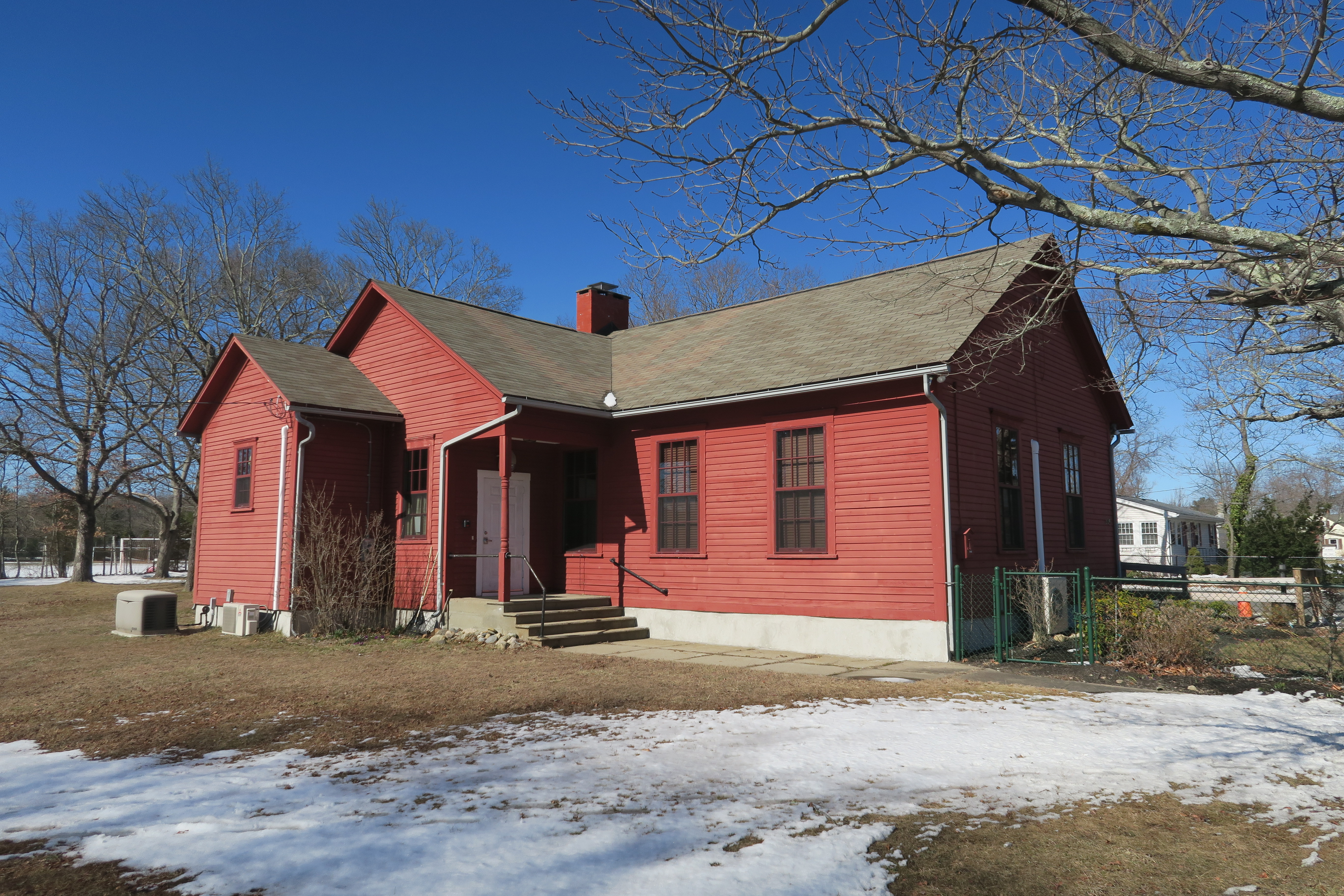
North Kingstown Food Pantry

Davisville is a village in the town of North Kingstown and county of Washington County in the U.S. state of Rhode Island. It was formerly the home of the Davisville Naval Construction Battalion Center, which housed the United States Navy's SeaBees.

== Village description ==
The mill village of Davisville in North Kingstown, Rhode Island is named after the Davis family. Historical evidence indicates that the family was involved in buying and selling enslaved people. Both Amtrak and MBTA's Providence/Stoughton Line pass through Davisville, though there is no railroad station here. A proposed MBTA station is currently being considered.

== Davisville NCBC ==
It was located at Quonset Point on Narragansett Bay, an area now included in the town of North Kingstown. The Navy acquired the property in 1939 and built Naval Air Station Quonset Point. In 1942, adjoining properties were developed for training Seabees, including the Naval Construction Battalion Center (NCBC) at Davisville. After World War II, the Naval Air Station remained in operation, but the NCBC was inactive until 1951, when the site was designated Headquarters, NCBC. The Naval Air Station was decommissioned in 1974. NCBC Davisville was selected for closure during the Base Realignment and Closure (BRAC 1991) program and operational closure occurred on April 1, 1994. The land eventually was obtained by the State of Rhode Island.

=== Redevelopment ===
The State of Rhode Island has invested heavily into the transportation infrastructure of the Quonset Business Park, including rail, water/sewer, and the $170 million Rte 403 Connector, a 4-lane highway connecting the Park to Route 4.

Today, the Park is the largest industrial park by employment levels in R.I. It is located on Narragansett Bay, Route 1 and Route 403. This 3,174-acre (12.84 km^{2}) master-planned business park had, in 2007, nearly 150 businesses with infrastructure capacity for 18,000 total employees. The largest business is General Dynamics Electric Boat. Also located in the Park is the North Atlantic Distribution, Inc (NORAD), the 7th largest automobile importer in North America. In 2011, the facility imported 150,519 autos and another 41,797 autos came by rail. There are some thousand cars at any time stored within the Park.

Within the park, the Quonset State Airport, which uses the former Navy Air Station Quonset Point runway, is managed by the Rhode Island Airport Corporation, is a general aviation facility with an 8,000 ft (2,400 m) runway.

Also located within the park are the Seabee Museum and Memorial Park, a non-profit museum developed on 6.5 acres (26,000 m^{2}) by former U.S. Navy Seabees which includes the former Navy concrete chapel, seven vintage Quonset huts, and a huge Seabee statue; and the non-profit Quonset Air Museum located in buildings that were originally built for the Naval Air Station Quonset Point (NASQP).

In 2007, the State of Rhode Island announced plans for a $150-million mega-yacht shipbuilding and repair yard that includes a training center on 43 acres (170,000 m^{2}) within the Park, and an $80 million mixed-use development: The Gateway Project. The over 450,000-square-foot (42,000 m^{2}) Gateway Project will include a hotel, visitor center, local grocer, drug store, coffee shop, restaurants, a bank, small shops, two anchor stores and will surround the Seabee Museum and Memorial Park. However, one of the anchor stores closed soon after opening and remains vacant; by 2016 no visitor center, drug store, or coffee shop had been constructed.
