= Rhode Island Route 403 =

Highway in Rhode Island

Route 403
- Quonset Freeway
- Route 403 highlighted in red

Route information
- Maintained by RIDOT
- Length: 4.5 mi (7.2 km)
- Existed: 1973 (original route); 2006 (freeway)–present

Major junctions
- West end: Route 4 in East Greenwich
- US 1 in North Kingstown
- East end: Commerce Park Road / Roger Williams Way in North Kingstown

Location
- Country: United States
- State: Rhode Island
- Counties: Kent, Washington

Highway system
- Rhode Island Routes
← Route 402	→ I-895

Route 403, also known as the Quonset Freeway, is a numbered state highway located in Washington County and Kent County, Rhode Island, United States. The route is a nominally east–west limited-access freeway for its entire length. A spur of Rhode Island Route 4, Route 403 serves Davisville and Quonset Point, providing freeway access to Interstate 95 and the northern Providence metropolitan area from the industrial zone. The western terminus of the freeway is at a trumpet interchange with Route 4 in East Greenwich. The route has three unnumbered interchanges along its 4.5-mile (7.2 km) length, including a junction with U.S. Route 1 in North Kingstown, before terminating at an at-grade intersection with Roger Williams Way and Commerce Park Road in Quonset. Route 403 is the highest numbered route in Rhode Island.

Prior to 2006, Route 403 was a narrow, two-lane road through Davisville. The western terminus of the route was at an interchange with Route 4 and Rhode Island Route 402 in East Greenwich, and the eastern terminus was at U.S. Route 1 in North Kingstown. In order to accommodate increasingly heavy commercial and commuter traffic to and from the Quonset Business Park, the Rhode Island Department of Transportation constructed the Quonset Freeway as an upgraded Route 403. The relocation of the route began in 2000 and was constructed in two phases; Phase 1, a freeway from Quonset to Davisville, opened in June 2006. Phase 2 of the relocation project, which connected the freeway with Route 4, was completed one year ahead of schedule in December 2008.

== Route description ==
=== Original Route 403 ===
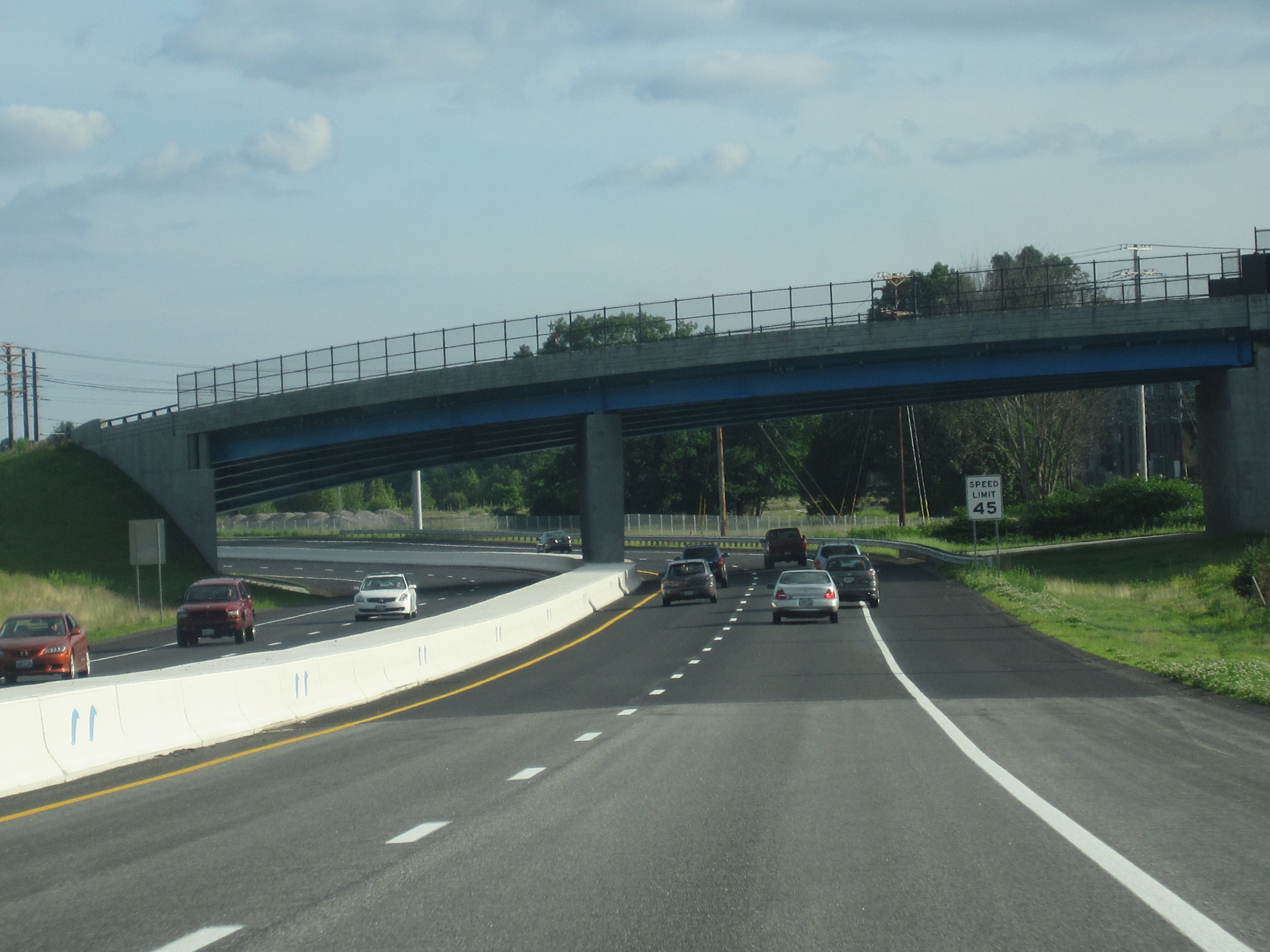
The Quonset Freeway passing under Devil's Foot Road, the original Route 403, in Davisville

Prior to 2006, Route 403 was a narrow, two-lane road running for 2.4 miles (3.9 km) through Davisville, Rhode Island. The road, a spur route of Route 4, connected to Rhode Island Route 402 and Route 4 at its western terminus, and was accessible only from Route 4 southbound. Its eastern terminus was at a grade-separated interchange with U.S. 1. The nominally east–west route followed a northwestern–southeastern route for most of its length. Route 403 was signed on two local roads, Davisville Road and Devil's Foot Road, in the towns of East Greenwich and North Kingstown.

Route 403's original western terminus was at a complex interchange with Routes 4 and 402 in East Greenwich. Both Routes 402 and 403 were accessible from Exit 7 on Route 4 southbound; there was no access to either route from the northbound lanes of Route 4. After the Exit 7 ramp, Route 403 eastbound crossed over Route 4 and began to head in southeastern direction along Davisville Road. Shortly after its western terminus, Route 403 crossed the Hunt River into Washington County and Davisville, a village in the town of North Kingstown. After intersecting Old Baptist Road, a local route that connects to Route 102, Route 403 began to follow Devil's Foot Road, continuing on its southeastern trajectory. The route crossed Amtrak's Northeast Corridor rail line before turning to head in an almost due east direction, entering the Quonset Business Park. Shortly after passing Devil's Foot Rock, a petrosomatoglyph attributed to the Devil in colonial times, Route 403 passed under U.S. Route 1 (Post Road) and intersected two US 1 access ramps, Davisville Road, and Quonset Road; the latter two roads headed into the business park toward Quonset State Airport and the Quonset container port. Although the mainline of the road continued eastbound as Quonset Road (now Roger Williams Way), Route 403 officially terminated at the intersection with the US 1 access ramps.

Since the completion of the Quonset Freeway in 2008 and the full relocation of Route 403, the old route on Davisville Road and Devil's Foot Road has been unnumbered. Some portions of the road are signed "To RI 403," but there is no indication that RIDOT plans to designate the old route as Rhode Island Route 403A. Route 403's previous alignment was largely unchanged during the construction of the Quonset Freeway; only the interchanges with Routes 4 and 402 in East Greenwich and with US 1 in North Kingstown were altered significantly.

=== Quonset Freeway ===
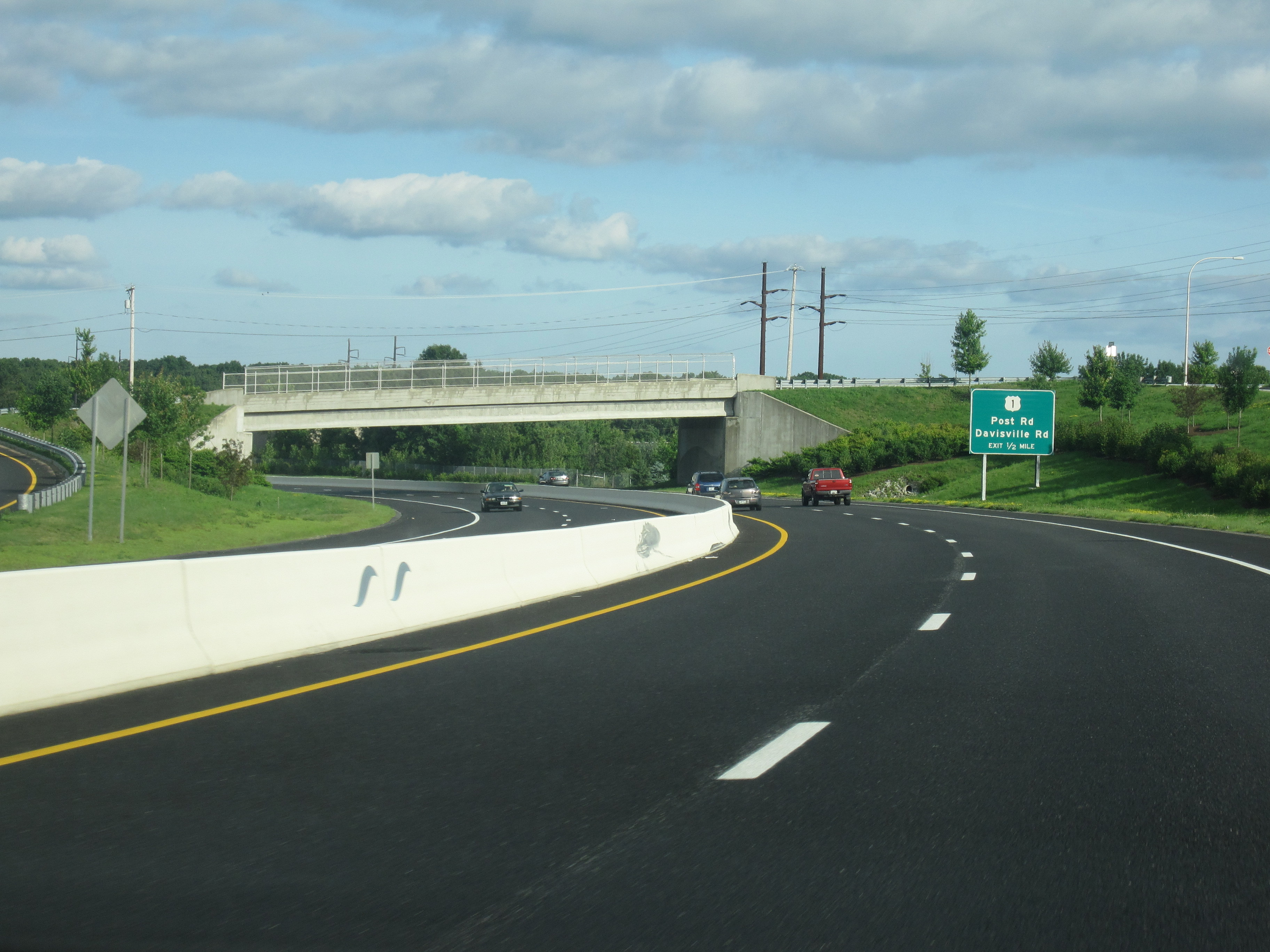
The Quonset Freeway approaching the West Davisville Road overpass

The Quonset Freeway begins in East Greenwich at Exit 7 of Route 4; southbound, the exit is numbered 7B, as Exit 7A serves Route 402. Unlike Route 402, which is accessible only via Route 4 southbound, Route 403 is accessible from the northbound lanes of Route 4 via the newly constructed Exit 7. Like the original Route 403, the nominally east–west freeway follows a northwestern–southeastern route for much of its length. Shortly after beginning at Route 4, Route 403 crosses over Route 402 and the Hunt River on a single-span bridge, entering the town of North Kingstown. The relocation of Route 403 removed access to Route 402; the freeway now travels over Frenchtown Road without an interchange. While there is no direct link between the two routes, motorists traveling westbound on Route 403 can take the exit for Route 4 south and then access Route 402 from Exit 7A off Route 4.

Route 403 continues in a southeastern direction before crossing over Amtrak's Northeast Corridor rail line. The freeway begins to closely parallel the railroad before crossing under Devil's Foot Road, the original Route 403, and entering the village of Davisville. Shortly after the overpass, Route 403 turns to head almost due east. The freeway has its first interchange with West Davisville Road; the exit is accessible only from eastbound Route 403, and serves the villages of Davisville and Quidnessett. Closely paralleling Devil's Foot Road, Route 403 continues eastward before interchanging with U.S. Route 1 (Post Road) and Davisville Road; the two roads are served via a single exit. Westbound Route 403 has no direct interchange with either US 1 or Davisville Road; the route's first westbound exit in Quonset is signed as "To US 1," and connects to Post Road via Gate Road, a commercial outlet in Quonset.

Shortly after the interchange with US 1, Route 403 begins to head in a southwestern direction. After 4.5 miles (7.2 km), Route 403 terminates at a traffic signal with Commerce Park Road, a commercial route that heads north into the business park. The mainline of Route 403 continues eastward as Roger Williams Way (formerly Quonset Road), a four-lane, undivided road that leads to Quonset State Airport.

== History ==
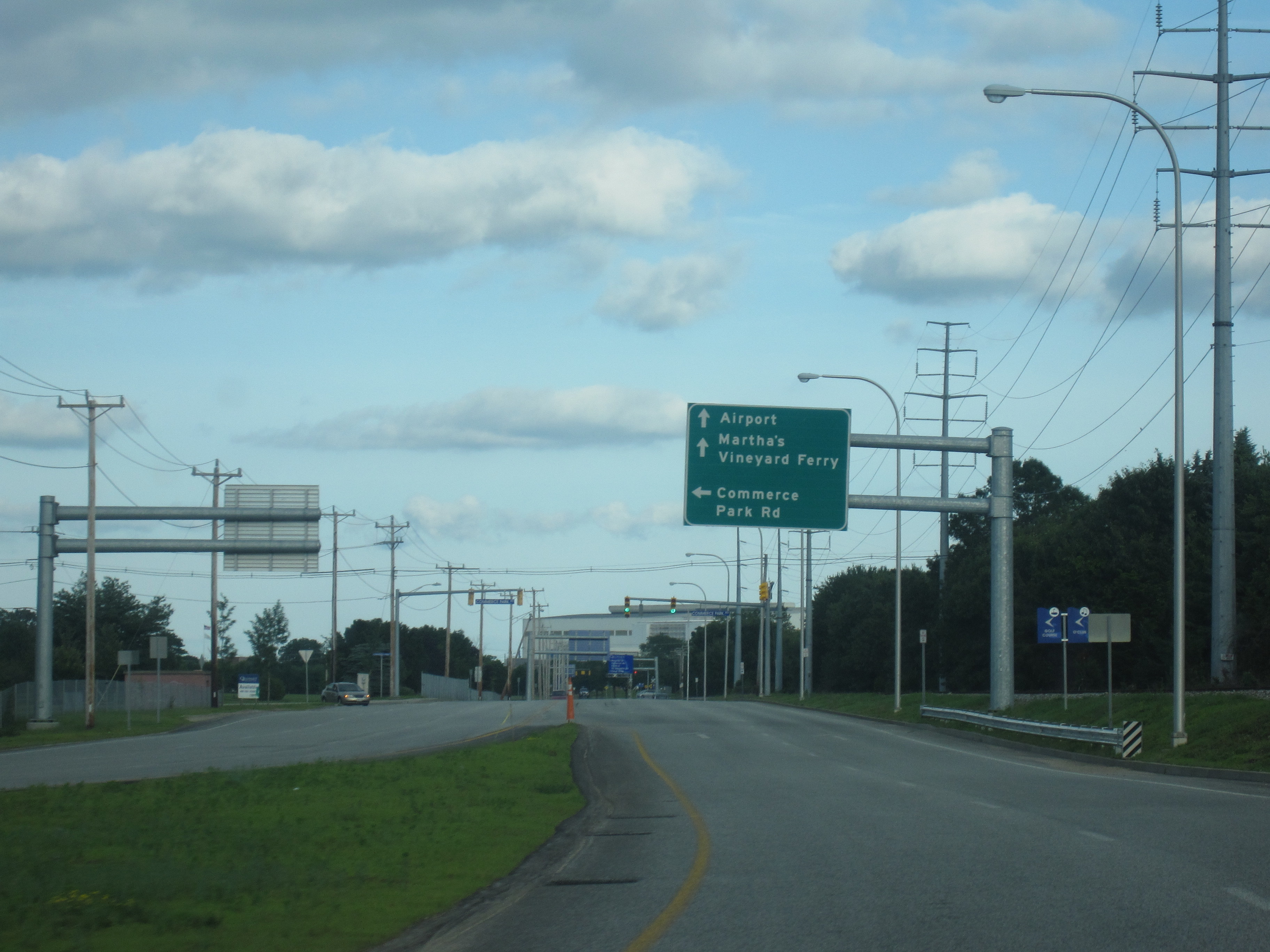
The eastern terminus of Route 403 in the Quonset Business Park

The original Route 403 that existed prior to 2006 was numbered in 1973 as a spur route of the newly constructed Route 4. The two-lane, undivided state highway was the main access road to Davisville and Quonset Point from Route 4. Quonset was home to Naval Air Station Quonset Point, a major U.S. naval base, until 1974. After the closure of the base, the Quonset Point region of North Kingstown was converted into an industrial zone and commercial district by the state of Rhode Island; a container port and the Quonset State Airport were also opened for commercial use.

By the 1980s, more than 12,000 cars were using Route 403 daily to access the business park; the Rhode Island Department of Transportation (RIDOT) estimated that this vehicle volume would exceed 25,000 by 2005. This high vehicle capacity would be dangerous because of Route 403's sharp curves and low speed limit in Davisville. The narrow route through a densely populated region was particularly unsuitable for the high volume of commercial trucks that used it to access Route 4 from the Quonset Business Park and container port. RIDOT began studies on improving the route in 1987, exploring both the widening of the existing route to a four-lane, undivided highway and the construction of a freeway as options. The proposal to widen the existing road was ultimately dropped, as it would less effective at relieving congestion in the region and would require significant demolition of existing structures in Davisville. A freeway alternative to be constructed north of the existing route with more direct access to Route 4 and an eastward expansion beyond US 1 into the Quonset Business Park was selected instead.

=== Construction of the Quonset Freeway ===
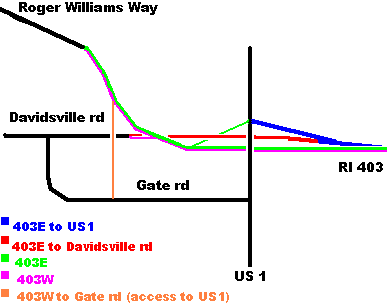
Diagram of the eastern terminus of Route 403 in North Kingstown

Construction of "Phase 1" of the four-lane, limited-access Quonset Freeway began in 2000 with excavation of the route and right-of-way acquisition; the project required the demolition of 13 structures, five commercial and eight residential. Phase 1 included an extension of the highway into the Quonset Business Park and the construction of several overpasses in Quonset, an exit ramp to Gate Road, a full interchange with U.S. Route 1 in North Kingstown, and a partial diamond interchange with West Davisville Road in Davisville. During Phase 1's construction, traffic was maintained on the existing Route 403 (Devil's Foot Road); the only major alteration to the route was the setting of a new eastern terminus of the road at US 1, as the previous terminus was demolished to allow for the construction of the freeway. Phase 1 cost $70 million to complete and was opened to traffic on June 22, 2006. The new freeway was posted with a speed limit of 45 miles per hour (72 km/h).

From 2006 until 2008, while Phase 2 of the relocated Route 403 was constructed, traffic on the newly completed freeway from Quonset to Davisville was redirected onto Davisville Road (the original route alignment), which continued on to the existing terminus at Routes 4 and 402. Traffic was diverted onto the original route alignment after the West Davisville Road interchange, passing over the Amtrak rail tracks via the existing Devil's Foot Road overpass bridge.

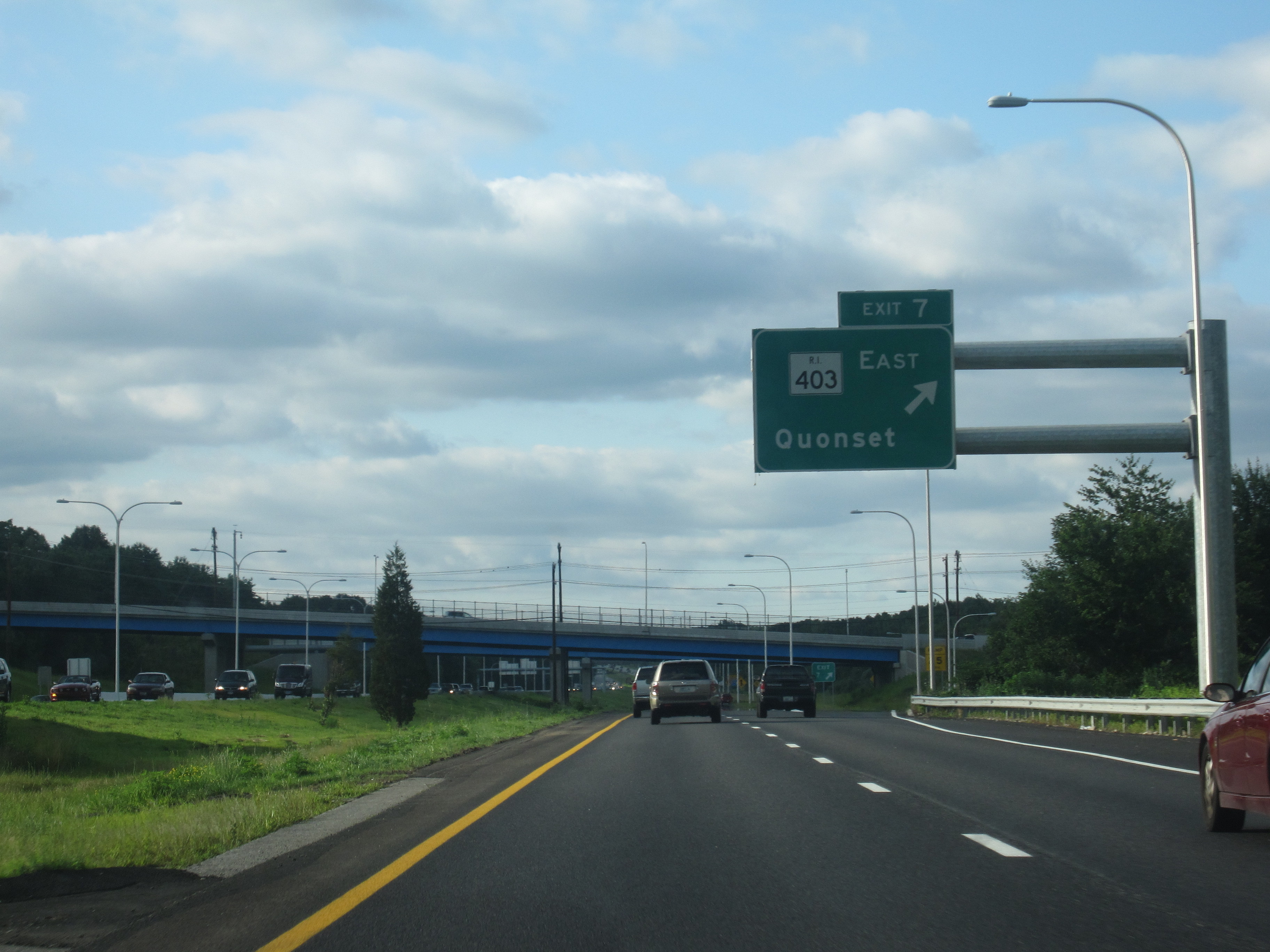
The new Exit 7 off Route 4 north

Construction of the $100 million-Phase 2 of the Quonset Freeway began in 2004 and continued until 2008. The project included the construction of new bridges over the Northeast Corridor rail line, Route 402, and Route 4. The existing Route 403 bridge over Route 4 was also demolished as a part of Phase 2. The freeway and ramps from Route 403 west to Route 4 north and from Route 4 south to Route 403 east opened on October 23, 2008. The route was posted with a speed limit of 50 miles per hour (80 km/h). The final portion of Phase 2, ramps from Route 403 west to Route 4 south and from Route 4 north to Route 403 east, opened in December 2008. As part of the construction of a trumpet interchange with Route 4 in East Greenwich, a new northbound Exit 7 on Route 4 was completed; the original Route 403 was accessible only from Route 4 southbound. All major construction on the freeway was completed in December 2008, one year ahead of schedule; minor projects continued on the relocated route until early 2009.

== Exit list ==
Exits were numbered in fall 2018 as part of a statewide conversion to mileage-based exit numbers.

County	Location	mi	km	Exit	Destinations	Notes
Kent	East Greenwich	0.0	0.0	–	Route 4 to I-95 – Narragansett, Providence	Western terminus; exit 7 on Route 4
Kent	East Greenwich	0.7	1.1	Hunt River bridge		
Washington	North Kingstown	2.3	3.7	2	West Davisville Road	Full diamond interchange opened on September 25, 2026; was an eastbound exit and westbound entrance
Washington	North Kingstown	3.1	5.0	3	US 1 (Post Road) / Davisville Road – Wickford	Eastbound signage; signed as exits 3A (Post Road) and 3B (Davisville Road)
Washington	North Kingstown	4.0	6.4	3	Gate Road to US 1 (Post Road)	Westbound signage
Washington	North Kingstown	4.5	7.2	–	Commerce Park Way / Roger Williams Way – Quonset State Airport	Eastern terminus; at-grade intersection; continues east as Roger Williams Way
1.000 mi = 1.609 km; 1.000 km = 0.621 mi

== See also ==
- List of state highways in Rhode Island
- Rhode Island Route 99
