= 401 BC =

401 BC in various calendars
Gregorian calendar	401 BC; CDI BC
Ab urbe condita	353
Ancient Egypt era	XXVIII dynasty, 4
Pharaoh	Amyrtaeus, 4
Ancient Greek Olympiad (summer)	94th Olympiad, year 4
Assyrian calendar	4350
Balinese saka calendar	N/A
Bengali calendar	−994 – −993
Berber calendar	550
Buddhist calendar	144
Burmese calendar	−1038
Byzantine calendar	5108–5109
Chinese calendar	己卯年 (Earth Rabbit); 2297 or 2090 — to — 庚辰年 (Metal Dragon); 2298 or 2091
Coptic calendar	−684 – −683
Discordian calendar	766
Ethiopian calendar	−408 – −407
Hebrew calendar	3360–3361
- Hindu calendars
Vikram Samvat	−344 – −343
Shaka Samvat	N/A
Kali Yuga	2700–2701
Holocene calendar	9600
Iranian calendar	1022 BP – 1021 BP
Islamic calendar	1053 BH – 1052 BH
Javanese calendar	N/A
Julian calendar	N/A
Korean calendar	1933
Minguo calendar	2312 before ROC 民前2312年
Nanakshahi calendar	−1868
Thai solar calendar	142–143
Tibetan calendar	阴土兔年 (female Earth-Rabbit) −274 or −655 or −1427 — to — 阳金龙年 (male Iron-Dragon) −273 or −654 or −1426

Year 401 BC was a year of the pre-Julian Roman calendar. At the time, it was known as the Year of the Tribunate of Potitus, Cossus, Camillus, Ambustus, Mamercinus and Iullus (or, less frequently, year 353 Ab urbe condita). The denomination 401 BC for this year has been used since the early medieval period, when the Anno Domini calendar era became the prevalent method in Europe for naming years.

== Events ==
=== By place ===
==== Persian empire ====
- Cyrus the Younger uses a quarrel with Tissaphernes over the Ionian cities as a pretext for gathering a large army and also pretends to prepare an expedition to Pisidia, in the Taurus Mountains. Cyrus starts out with about 15,220 men, of whom 10,400 are Greek mercenaries. When he reaches the Euphrates River at Thapsacus, he announces that he is marching against Artaxerxes II. He advances unopposed into Babylonia; but Artaxerxes, warned at the last moment by Tissaphernes, hastily gathers an army. The two forces meet in the Battle of Cunaxa, north of Babylon, where Cyrus is slain.

==== Greece ====
- The Greek mercenaries fighting for Cyrus are left stranded after Cyrus' defeat. They fight their way north through hostile Persians, Armenians, and Kurds to Trapezus on the coast of the Black Sea under Xenophon, who becomes their leader when the satrap of Lydia, Tissaphernes, has Clearchus of Sparta and the other senior Greek captains captured and executed.
- Agesilaus II becomes king of Sparta on the death of his stepbrother Agis II.

==== China ====
- Zhou an wang becomes king of the Zhou dynasty of China.

=== By topic ===
==== Literature ====
- Sophocles' tragic play Oedipus at Colonus is performed posthumously. It is produced by his grandson (also called Sophocles) at the Festival of Dionysus in Athens.

== Deaths ==
- Agis II, Eurypontid king of Sparta
- Clearchus, Spartan general and mercenary
- Cyrus the Younger, younger son of Darius II, King of Persia
