= Rhode Island Route 402 =

Highway in Rhode Island

Route 402
- Frenchtown Road
- Route 402 highlighted in red

Route information
- Maintained by RIDOT
- Length: 1.2 mi (1.9 km)

Major junctions
- West end: Route 2 in East Greenwich
- Route 4 in East Greenwich
- East end: US 1 in North Kingstown

Location
- Country: United States
- State: Rhode Island

Highway system
- Rhode Island Routes
← Route 401	→ Route 403

Route 402 is a numbered state highway running 1.2 miles (1.9 km) in the U.S. state of Rhode Island. Route 402 is a major corridor through both East Greenwich and North Kingstown, and often locally referred to as Frenchtown Road.

== Route description ==
Route 402 begins in East Greenwich at Route 2 (County Trail) and heads east as a four-lane road through a suburban area. It meets Route 4 (Col. Rodman Highway) just east of here at that highway's exit 7A, then passes under Route 403 without access. The road continues east as it exits Kent County and enters the northern portion of North Kingstown, Washington County, where it meets its eastern terminus at an intersection with US 1 (Post Road).

== Major intersections ==
County	Location	mi	km	Destinations	Notes
Kent	East Greenwich	0.0	0.0	Route 2 (South County Trail)	Western terminus
Kent	East Greenwich	0.3	0.48	Route 4 north – Providence	Exit 7A on Route 4
Washington	North Kingstown	1.4	2.3	US 1 (Post Road)	Eastern terminus
1.000 mi = 1.609 km; 1.000 km = 0.621 mi
