= Quonset Point =

Peninsula in Rhode Island, US

Coordinates: 41.595°N 71.415°W

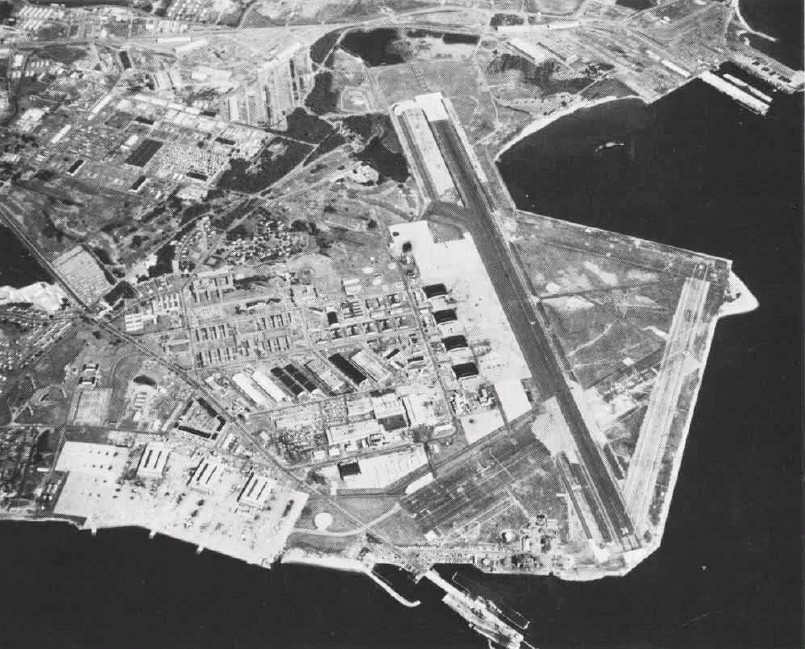
Quonset Point in the 1960s

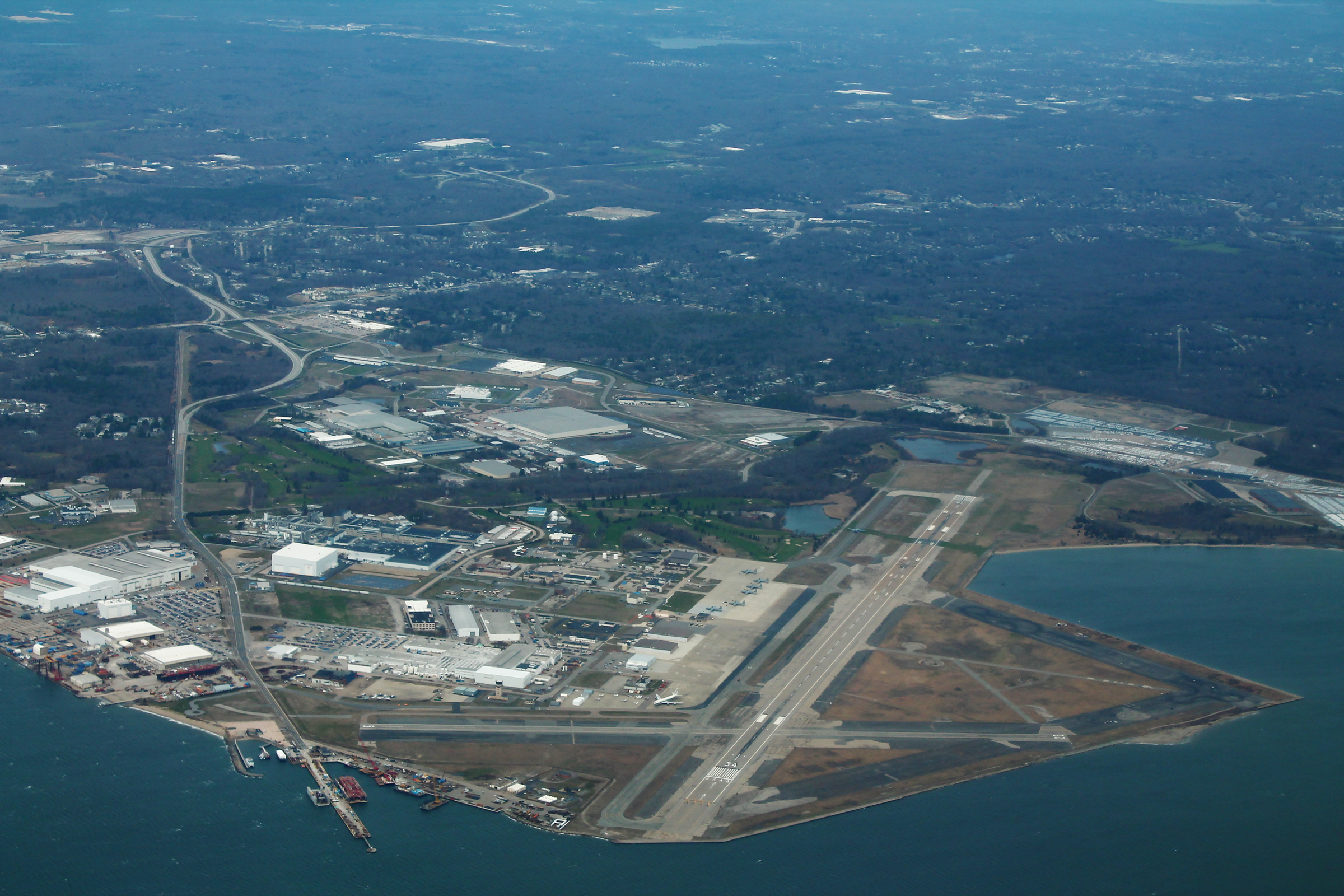
2016 view of Quonset Point showing Quonset State Airport

Quonset Point (/ˈkwɒnsɪt/), also known simply as Quonset, is a small peninsula in Narragansett Bay in the town of North Kingstown, Rhode Island. Its name is widely known from the Quonset hut, which was first manufactured there. Quonset is an Algonquian word meaning "small, long place".

Quonset Point was the location of Naval Air Station Quonset Point, a large United States Navy base. The peninsula is now used for industrial purposes and is partially abandoned. A major industry located there is a hull-fabrication and outfitting facility for the Electric Boat Corporation. It was also home to Camp Endicott, home to the Atlantic fleet Seabees.

Quonset Point is currently home to Quonset State Airport which is a joint civil-military public airport home to the Quonset Point Air National Guard Station and the 143d Airlift Wing (143 AW) of the Rhode Island Air National Guard, flying the C-130J Hercules.

== Port of Davisville ==
In 2009, the National Oceanic and Atmospheric Administration (NOAA) decided that the Port would be home to Okeanos Explorer, a one-of-a-kind research vessel devoted entirely to exploring unknown parts of the world's oceans. It is a former United States Navy surveillance ship acquired by the NOAA and converted into a deep-sea research vessel.

== Transportation ==
Quonset Point can be reached by air and sea, as well as by road.

Rhode Island Route 403 is a freeway branching from Rhode Island Route 4 that serves the area. Quonset is also served by a railroad spur from Amtrak's Northeast Corridor. The Providence and Worcester Railroad provides freight service along this stretch of the Corridor.

Ferry service to and from Oak Bluffs, Martha's Vineyard is provided by Rhode Island Fast Ferry, and the port of Davisville offers berths for commercial shipping. The Quonset Airport is a general aviation facility with a 7,500 ft (2,300 m) runway and a staffed control tower. Interstate 95 is nearby, and Rhode Island Public Transit Authority (RIPTA) buses also serve Quonset Point.

== Ferry dock ==
The ferry dock at Quonset Point is the main terminal for Rhode Island Fast Ferry's high-speed ferry Julia Leigh to Oak Bluffs, Massachusetts. A shuttle bus leaves every hour before the ferry departs; and after the ferry arrives, a bus travels to the Providence Airport (T. F. Green State Airport) and the Kingston Amtrak train station.

== Seabee Museum ==
Seabee Museum and Memorial Park in North Kingstown, Rhode Island is a museum dedicated to the men and women who served in the Battalion. It aims to highlight the deeds of the United States Naval Construction Battalions during both times of war and peace.

== Events ==
=== Air show ===
The Rhode Island Air Show is held annually by the Rhode Island National Guard and is perhaps the most well-known event to take place on Quonset Point. The event began in 1991 as a relatively minor aviation exhibition but grew in attendance each year, with the USAF Thunderbirds performing every even year and the USN Blue Angels performing every odd year. The Rhode Island National Guard also displayed their locally based C-130J Hercules aircraft and UH-60 Blackhawk helicopters in combined forces demos. Military aircraft demonstrations that have been featured in the past have included the F-22 Raptor (2007, 2009 and 2014), F-16 Fighting Falcon (2003, 2009, 2011), A-10 Thunderbolt II (2006, 2010), F-15E Strike Eagle (2007, 2008), EA-6B Prowler (2012), F/A-18C Hornet (2006, 2008, 2010), F/A-18F Super Hornet (2007) and AV-8B Harrier (2008) while civilian performers have included Sean D. Tucker, John Klatt, and Michael Goulian as well as the GEICO Skytypers. Attendance in 2011 was so high that the show was sold out after parking locations filled up. The 2012 show yielded a similar audience, and each previous year had a normal attendance of over 200,000. However, in 2013 the show was canceled due to federal budget cuts, causing all USAF units to cut aviation support to public events and the grounding of both the USN Blue Angels and USAF Thunderbirds.

=== Other events ===
Former United States President Richard Nixon served in the United States Navy from 1942 to 1946, rising from Lieutenant Junior Grade to Lieutenant Commander. He underwent basic training at Quonset Point in 1942 where he met William P. Rogers, later his first Secretary of State.

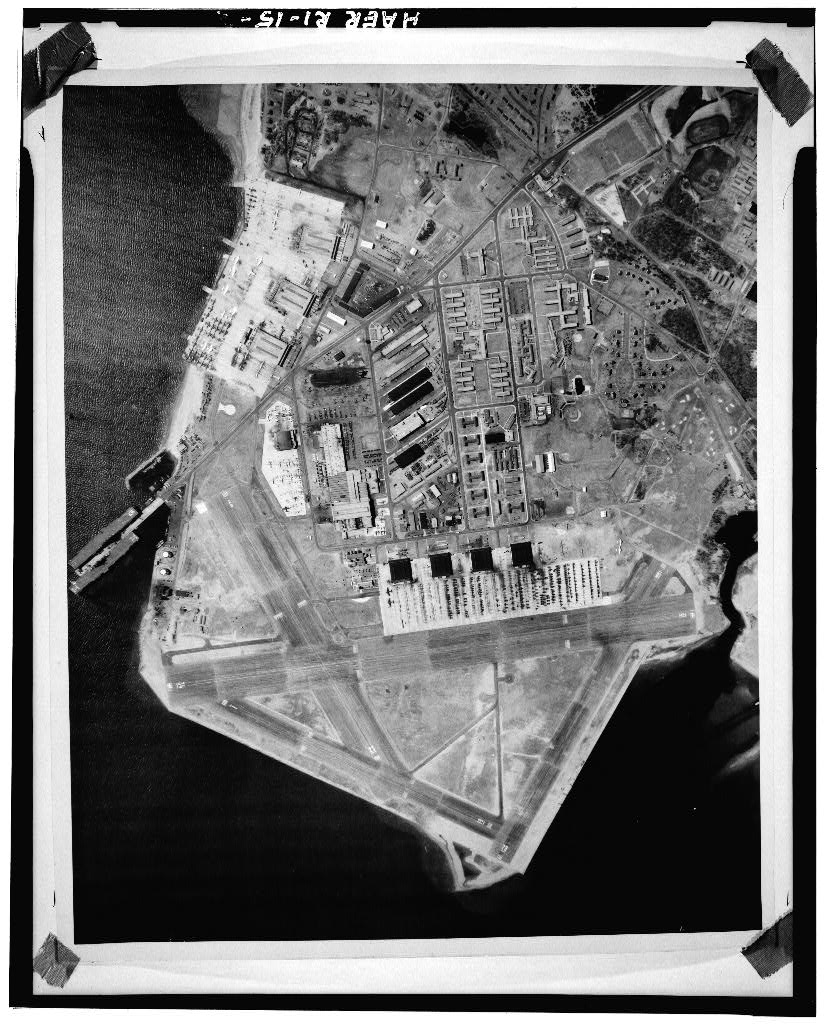
Quonset Point in the 1960s from an aerial shot

During the 1950s, Quonset Point was home port for the aircraft carriers, USS Antietam, USS Tarawa, and USS Leyte. During the 1960s and early 1970s, four aircraft carriers used Quonset Point as their home port. The carriers were USS Lake Champlain, USS Essex, USS Wasp, and USS Intrepid.
